= Josef =

Josef may refer to

- Josef (given name)
- Josef (surname)
- Josef (film), a 2011 Croatian war film
- Musik Josef, a Japanese manufacturer of musical instruments
