= Jason Rogel =

American actor (born 1976)

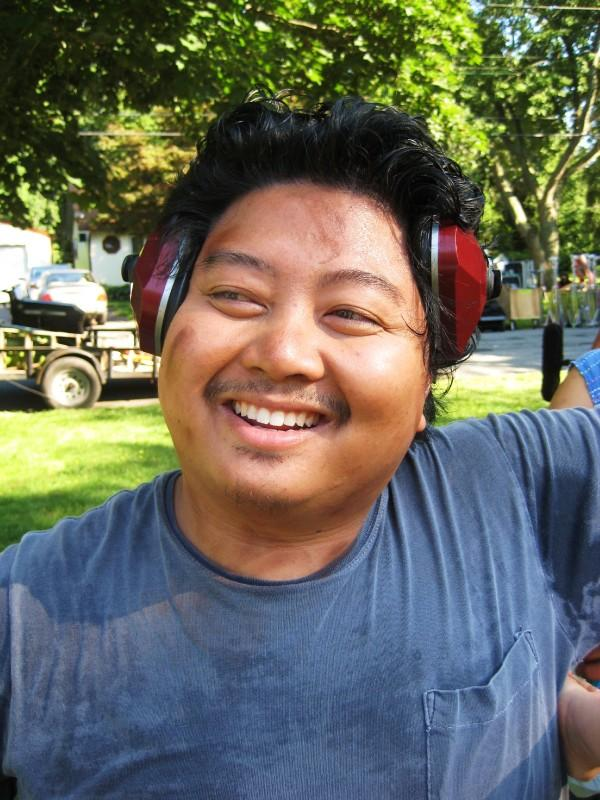
- Rogel as Wayne Chung on the set of Splinterheads in 2008
- Born: August 6, 1976 (age 49); Long Beach, California, U.S.
- Occupation: Actor
- Years active: 2007–present

Jason Rogel (born August 6, 1976) is an American actor. He recently played Sebastian on Season 2 of Raven's Home. Rogel also starred as Ricky, the office gossip, on Freeform's Kevin from Work, and as Larry in ABC Family's Christmas musical, The Mistle-Tones. Also guest starring on Henry danger as Morgan Maykew.

== Life and career ==
Rogel was born and raised in Long Beach, California. He is of Filipino descent.

Rogel graduated with a bachelor's degree in Theatre Arts from California State University, Long Beach, and also studied acting at Australia's National Institute of Dramatic Art.

In 2009, Rogel appeared opposite Thomas Middleditch, Rachael Taylor, Lea Thompson, and Christopher McDonald in the indie romantic-comedy Splinterheads. Since then, he has appeared in various commercials, webseries, and television shows, including The Office, Community, Dexter, Bones, Monk, and How I Met Your Mother. He played Martin, the tech-savvy busboy in the 2011 SyFy original movie, Swamp Shark, also starring Kristy Swanson, D.B. Sweeney, Robert Davi and baseball legend Wade Boggs . He also recurred as Physics grad student Leo on ABC Family's, State of Georgia, starring Raven-Symoné, Majandra Delfino and Loretta Devine.

In 2012, he starred alongside Tia Mowry and Tori Spelling in ABC Family's first original holiday musical, The Mistle-Tones, which premiered as part of their 25 Days of Christmas event. Rogel also played cameraman Marcus on the MTV series, Zach Stone Is Gonna Be Famous starring comedian, Bo Burnham.

In addition to film and TV, Rogel has appeared in numerous theatre productions, working with such companies as East West Players, LoudRMouth, and The Garage Theatre Company. He has also toured his mini-musical, M.Saigon, a parody of the Broadway hit Miss Saigon, with the hereandnow Theatre Company.

In 2014, Rogel appeared in the Old Navy ads with Debra Wilson, Amy Poehler and Dascha Polanco. He was a cast member of the Fil-Am sketch comedy show PUN PLIP PRIDAYS, which aired on LA18's Kababayan Today with G. Tongi. In 2015, he appeared opposite Regina Hall, Eve & Jill Scott in the Lifetime (TV network) Original, With This Ring (2015 film), written and directed by Nzingha Stewart.

== Filmography and TV roles ==
Year	Film	Role	Notes
2007	Rattle Basket	Virgil	
2008	Jimmy Kimmel Live!	Slimmons Hip Hop Dancer	
2008	Zombies Ate My Prom Date	Chubsy	
2008	The Sarah Silverman Program	Mongolian Gay Guy No. 2	
2008	Brown Soup Thing	Cousin Jason	
2009	How I Met Your Mother	Clerk	
2009	The Office	Erik	
2009	Bones	Broderick Mullins	
2009	Monk	Satellite Enthusiast	
2009	The Amazing Mrs. Novak	Stockboy Vincent	
2009	Donna on Demand	Utility Nerd	
2009	Dexter	Langsbury	
2009	Splinterheads	Wayne Chung	
2009	Community	Ropati Eneki	
2010	Romantically Challenged	Registrar	
2011	Swamp Shark	Martin	
2011	Supah Ninjas	Barry	
2011	State of Georgia	Leo	5 episodes
2011	Man Up	Henry Trunka	2 episodes
2012	Lost Angeles	Barista	
2012	Gulliver Quinn	Mr. Martinson	
2012	House of Lies	Manager	
2012	Happy Valley	Kiko	
2012	The Mistle-Tones	Larry	
2013	Zach Stone Is Gonna Be Famous	Marcus	8 episodes
2014	Mr. Maple Leaf	Mutt Owner	
2014	Miss Guidance	Mr. Stern/Ma	2 episodes
2014	Hart of Dixie	Walter Wallen	
2015	Cougar Town	Change Customer	
2015	With This Ring	Mikiko	
2015	Kevin From Work	Ricky	10 episodes
2015	Life in Pieces	Honus	
2016	Dice	Salesman	
2016	Heartbeat	Dancer	
2016	Impastor	Sean	2 episodes
2017	Love By The 10th Date	Porsche	
2017	Walk of Fame	Barista	
2017	All Exchanges Final	Clerk	
2017	Keloid	Dennis	
2017	Lady Dynamite	Rodel	Season 2
2017	This Is Us	Karl	
2018	Bosch	Det. Jeremy Fix	4 episodes
2018	Khol	Timothy	
2018	Henry Danger	Morgan Maykew	
2018	Homecoming	Nurse Cory	3 episodes
2018	Raven's Home	Sebastian	4 episodes
2018	The Kids Are Alright	Mailman	1 episode
2019	Rim of the World	Customs Official	
2019	Tall Girl	Dr. Sager	
2019	Princess Rap Battle	Tweedledee	2 episodes
2020	The Babysitter: Killer Queen	Officer Phil	
2021	Magnum P.I.	Maui	
2022	Warped!	Owen	
2022	The Neighborhood	Alejandro	
2022	NCIS	Leo	
2022	Young Sheldon	Nigel	2 episodes
2022	Josep	Will Lee	Pilot
