= The Mistle-Tones =

- Promotional poster
- Written by: Jed Elinoff; Scott Thomas
- Directed by: Paul Hoen
- Starring: Tia Mowry; Tori Spelling; Reginald VelJohnson; Tammy Townsend; Jonathan Patrick Moore; Jason Rogel; Megan Kathleen Duffy; Andy Gala; Britani Bateman
- Theme music composer: Kenneth Burgomaster
- Country of origin: United States
- Original language: English

Production
- Producer: Matias Alvarez
- Cinematography: Suki Medencevic
- Editor: Don Brochu

Original release
- Network: ABC Family
- Release: December 9, 2012

The Mistle-Tones is a made-for-TV movie musical that premiered on December 9, 2012 as part of ABC Family's 25 Days of Christmas.

== Plot ==
Holly is excited to audition for the Snow Belles, a Christmas-themed pop group founded by her late mother. However, lead Belles singer Marci denies Holly a chance to audition when she shows up late. Nevertheless, Holly takes to the stage and delivers a sensational audition and is upset when Marci passes her over in favor of Staci. Holly is depressed about being turned down, even after her sister suggests she start her own group.

Soon, though, Holly begins to see merit in the idea and decides to ask the manager of the local mall if she can perform at the local Christmas Eve celebration. The manager decides to hold auditions and a competition as a publicity stunt and agrees to let Holly's group into the show. Holly recruits a group of her coworkers including her best friend, AJ, large and lovable Larry, and the shy HR manager, Bernie. They begin rehearsals in the company warehouse. After the second day of rehearsals, AJ says to Holly that he thinks they are doing well, but Holly thinks they need something more.

Later that evening, Holly skids off the road while driving home and crashes into a snowbank. While waiting on a tow truck, she seeks shelter in a nearby tavern and is shocked to discover her boss, the normally uptight and goal-oriented Nick, is a crowd favorite on the karaoke stage due to his energy and stage presence. He sings the song "Burning Love" and wows the crowd . Holly records his performance and uses it to blackmail him into helping her turn the group into solid competition for the Snow Belles. At first, Nick tells that group that he will help, but no one is to know and that they should not consider him a member of the group, too. Eventually, he begins to warm to the group and even joins in performing during rehearsals. It is during one of the last rehearsals where Staci who is hiding in the warehouse, videos the Mistle Tones with Nick singing along. The chemistry between Nick and Holly is more evident and obvious that they are attracted to one another. After the practice Holly invites Nick to join them for a drink at Dickens Tavern, where Holly first saw Nick perform Karaoke. At the bar, AJ, Larry, Bernie and Holly try to think of a name for the band. When she gets home she pulls out the mistletoe that she had removed from above Nick's office door and comes up with the name the Mistle-Tones.

Having seen a video of the group's performance, Marci begins to see Holly as a potential threat and offers her a spot in the Belles to ensure the Mistle-Tones won't compete. Holly confides in Nick that she is considering the offer and begins to tell the others at their office Christmas party. Nick, however, interrupts her by singing "Winter Wonderland" and leading the group in an impromptu performance. Afterwards, Nick tells Holly that the Mistle-Tones are her group and they need her. Holly is just so touched by what he says. She looks up at the mistletoe in the corner and kisses Nick for the first time. She then says that the band needs his help. He says that he is already helping them, and kisses Holly again. She says no what she meant is that the only way the Mistle-tones can win the event is if he sings with them. He says nothing would make him happier. He will sing with the group the following day. However, as Nick is watching Holly get into her car he receives a call from a company executive telling him that he has the promotion and they want him to take over the South Asian division and for him to get on a plane that evening.

The next night at the audition, the group observe some of the other acts competing while waiting for Nick to arrive. Holly tries to call Nick, but only gets his answering machine. She realizes that he won't be joining them on stage. Larry volunteers to take over Nick's part and they go on stage without him. The performance goes well but is upstaged by the arrival of the Belles mid-performance. The audience ignores the rest of the Mistle-Tones' song and the Belles go on to win the audition. Holly becomes despondent at the loss, but her father reminds her that her mother used to enjoy simply singing and that she used to end every show by singing onstage to Holly. After her father finishes their little talk, Holly receives a call from Nick. He tells her that he has been on a plane all night and that he is really sorry. He tells her that he was offered the promotion and that it was something he has always wanted. She wishes him the best then hangs up the phone. She goes into the family room where her father and sister Grace are watching a video of her mother singing to Holly when Holly was three years old.

The following week at the Christmas Eve show, Holly wishes the Belles a Merry Christmas. She stays for the entire show and then leaves. On the stairs she sees a mother talking to her daughter which brings up memories of the times shared with her own mother. When she gets to the bottom of the stairs she hears music and from a distance can see AJ, Larry and Bernie. She wonders what they are doing. As she gets closer she is excited by seeing her friends, but when the makeshift stage turns she sees Nick. He starts to sing "Christmas (Baby Please Come Home)" then stops and walks down the steps towards Holly and asks her to sing with him. She is shocked that he is there. She tell him no that she doesn't want to sing. Her sister Grace tells her to go on to sing. When Nick sees her hesitate he asks the crowd if they would like to hear Holly sing. The crowd cheers. Holly smiles half heartedly then asks Nick what he is doing there. He proceeds to tell her that he refused the promotion, thinking that it is something that he has always wanted but now he realizes what he really wants is Holly. She smiles and tells him that she is going to "make him work for this" and he says that's okay because he's a workaholic. He begs her to sing with him and she agrees, dueting with Nick as the town and the Snow Belles enjoy the show.

== Cast ==
- Tia Mowry as Holly, the daughter of the founder of the Snow-Belles and an aspiring Snow-Belle herself and Nick's love interest
- Tori Spelling as Marci, the leader of the Snow Belles
- Reginald VelJohnson as Holly's dad
- Tammy Townsend as Grace, Holly's sister
- Jonathan Patrick Moore as Nick, Holly's workaholic boss and love interest who has a secret passion for music. When she finds this out, she enlists his help and he eventually ends up becoming the fifth and final member of the Mistle-Tones.
- Jason Rogel as Larry, the productions worker at Ridgefield International Resources, and the third member of the Mistle-Tones
- Megan Kathleen Duffy as Bernie, the HR manager for Ridgefield International Resources and the fourth member of the Mistle-Tones
- Andy Gala as AJ, Holly's best friend and the second member of the Mistle-Tones
- Britani Bateman as Staci, the newest and most conniving member of the Snow-Belles
- Melanie Lewis-Yribar as Barb, an outspoken member of the Snow-Belles
- Sydney Sorenson as Amber, a member of the Snow-Belles
- Tanisha Lang as Jennifer, a member of the Snow-Belles

== Reception ==
The Mistle-Tones premiered at the #1 spot across multiple demographics in its time slot, making it ABC Family's third most watched original movie in the 25 Days of Christmas event among the younger female demographic. "The Mistle-Tones: (Sun., 8:00 – 10:00 p.m.) ranked as cable TV’s #1 telecast in the time slot for Adults 18–34 (765,000), Women 18–34 (603,000), Adults 18–49 (1.4 million), Women 18–49 (1.1 million), Viewers 12–34 (1.3 million), and Females 12–34 (1.08 million)." A total of 3.16 million viewers tuned into the premiere.
