= Whitney Avalon =

American singer-songwriter and actress

- Education: Brandeis University (B.A., 2003)
- Occupations: Singer-songwriter; actress; writer; online producer; internet personality; rapper
- Known for: YouTube videos

YouTube information
- Channel: Whitney Avalon
- Years active: 2007–present
- Genres: Music; comedy
- Subscribers: 2.05 million
- Views: 788 million
- Last updated: November 5, 2025
- Website: whitneyavalon.com

Whitney Avalon is an American singer-songwriter, actress, writer, producer, and rapper best known for creating the Princess Rap Battle series and other musical comedy on YouTube, where her channel has over 775 million views, and for writing the songs of Phineas and Ferb from its fifth season onwards.

As a songwriter and performer, she has a Recording Industry Association of America-certified Gold record, which she unboxed with fellow comedy musician "Weird Al" Yankovic.

Variety listed her in their 2015 Comedy Impact Report, stating her work has "amassed over half a billion views" worldwide in a year. She was also named one of Cosmopolitan's "Internet's Most Fascinating" people in 2015.

== Early life ==
Avalon graduated summa cum laude from Brandeis University in 2003 with a B.A. in Theater Arts.

== Princess Rap Battles ==
The Princess Rap Battles series was created by Whitney Avalon and features fictional female characters facing off against each other in the form of a rap battle. Whitney Avalon appears in every episode as a major rap opponent.

She posted the first Princess Rap Battle "Snow White vs. Elsa" in September 2014. Since then, she has posted more rap battles on the channel, including "Galadriel vs. Leia", "Mrs. Claus vs. Mary Poppins", and "Cinderella vs. Belle" starring Sarah Michelle Gellar, who is a fan of the series. Subsequent episodes include "Maleficent vs. Daenerys" starring Yvonne Strahovski, "Katniss vs. Hermione" starring Molly Quinn, "Freya vs. Ravenna" and "Rapunzel & Flynn vs. Anna & Kristoff". Avalon then posted two Wonderland vs. Oz themed battles: "Dorothy vs. Alice" starring Emily Kinney, Ryan McCartan, Jason Rogel, and Joey Richter followed by "The Queen of Hearts vs. The Wicked Witch of the West" with Alyssa Preston, Ben Giroux and (like all the battles) Avalon herself. A 2020 episode of the series featured Harley Quinn, Black Canary, and Huntress teaming up. An episode, released in 2022, shows Genshin Impact characters Fischl and Mona battling. The latest episode, released in 2026, features Ariel rapping against Moana.

No. in series	Title	Running time	Original release date	Viewers (millions)	Link
1	"Snow White vs Elsa"	2:21	September 17, 2014	279	
Snow White (Whitney Avalon) and Elsa (Katja Glieson) face off in a fairy tale-themed rap battle. It ends with Snow White getting frozen by Elsa. Backup: Cinderella (Alice Prime) and Aurora (Briana White) for Snow White. Merida (Caroline Gayle) and Tiana (Shawana Carter) for Elsa. Cameos: An unnamed actress as Old Hag (the Evil Queen's transformation).
2	"Galadriel vs Leia"	2:21	November 25, 2014	34	
Galadriel (Sara Erikson) from The Lord of the Rings and Princess Leia (Avalon) from Star Wars face off against each other. Backup: Arwen (Erika Davidson) and Legolas (Scotch Hopkins) for Galadriel. Luke Skywalker (Erik Thomas) and Han Solo (Shannon Costa) for Leia. Cameos: Jim Klimek as Pippin Took (credited: Pippin the Hobbit), Rose Marie Love and Kristina Ramirez as Slave Leias (wearing the bikini costume).
3	"Mrs. Claus vs Mary Poppins"	3:09	December 22, 2014	42	
Mrs. Claus (Alyssa Preston) and Mary Poppins (Avalon) face off in a Christmas holiday-themed rap battle. Each character's respectively sidekick Santa Claus (Jim O'Heir) and Bert (Kevin Allen, based on Dick Van Dyke in 1964 film Mary Poppins) later join the battle. It ends with Mrs. Claus and Santa being blown away by the wind. Cameos: Paul Nabil Matthis and Frank Eady as Stark Bannermen from Game of Thrones.
4	"Cinderella vs Belle"	2:59	March 11, 2015	123	
In the 2nd fairy tale-themed rap battle, Cinderella (Sarah Michelle Gellar) and Belle (Avalon) face off against each other. Backup: Goldilocks (Emily Goss) and Buttercup (Ali Williams) for Cinderella. Little Red Riding Hood (Courtney Merritt) and Pocahontas (Nikki Mejia) for Belle. Cameos: Michael Harris as Gaston. Note: Previously, Cinderella appeared as backup character, portrayed by Alice Prime, in the first rap battle ("Snow White vs Elsa").
5	"Maleficent vs Daenerys"	3:24	June 24, 2015	48	
Maleficent (Avalon) and Daenerys Targaryen (Yvonne Strahovski) from Game of Thrones face off against each other. At on point, the battle switches from live-action to animation: Maleficent in her dragon form (based on Disney's 1959 film Sleeping Beauty) spits fire at Daenerys, but left her unharmed. Backup: Missandei (Bianca DeGroat) and Grey Worm (Lorenzo Adams) for Daenerys. Diaval (Nathan Graham Smith, based on Sam Riley in 2014 film Maleficent) for Maleficent. Cameos: Gregory Guy Gorden and Brad Gage as Wayne Campbell and Garth Algar
6	"Katniss vs Hermione"	3:59	November 18, 2015	55	
Katniss Everdeen (Avalon) from The Hunger Games and Hermione Granger (Molly C. Quinn) from Harry Potter face off against each other. Backup: Harry Potter (Chase Fein) and Ron Weasley (Evin Michaels) for Hermione. Peeta Mellark (John Robert Keena) and Gale Hawthorne (Cole Gerdes) for Katniss. Cameos: Thomas Stiver as Albus Dumbledore and Taryn Southern as Effie Trinket
7	"Freya vs Ravenna"	3:52	April 6, 2016	45	
For the Winter's War, the Evil Queen Ravenna (Laura Marano) and her sister the Snow Queen Freya (Avalon) face off in a rap battle. Eric the Huntsman (Derek Theler) and his wife Sara (Jessica Bishop) join in against both queens, but getting cut off and isolated by Freya, who uses her magical powers to build a huge ice wall. Backup: Tull (Burl Moseley as Sope Dirisu) and a huntswoman (Kimberly Fox) for Freya. Two guards (Ryan Marsico and Aaron Alberstein) for Ravenna. Cameos: Whitney Avalon as Snow White (re-appearing from the first rap battle). Note: Several film props and costumes from the 2016 film The Huntsman: Winter's War were used for the video shoot. Additionally, Avalon and Steve Gossett met some cast members, including Jessica Chastain and Chris Hemsworth, who played the actual Sara and Eric the Huntsman in the film, respectively.
8	"Rapunzel vs Anna"	3:48	November 29, 2016	40	
Rapunzel (Eliza Dushku) and Anna (Avalon) from Frozen face off against each other. Flynn Rider (Tom Lenk) and Kristoff (James Maslow), each character's respectively love interest, participate in the rap battle. Cameos: Jim O'Heir as Santa Claus (re-appearing from the 3rd rap battle: "Mrs. Claus vs Mary Poppins").
9	"Dorothy vs Alice"	5:51	November 9, 2018	21	
Dorothy Gale (Avalon) from the Land of Oz and Alice (Emily Kinney) from Wonderland face off against each other, with the help of their respective teams. Alice's team: Mad Hatter (Ryan McCartan), Tweedledum and Tweedledee (Reggie De Leon and Jason Rogel). Dorothy's team: Scarecrow (Joey Richter), Tin Man (Burl Moseley) and Cowardly Lion (Mark Teich).
10	"The Queen of Hearts vs Wicked Witch"	3:21	November 23, 2019	7.8	
The two villains Wicked Witch of the West (Avalon) from Land of Oz and The Queen of Hearts (Alyssa Preston) from Wonderland face off against each other. Backup: King of Hearts (Ben Giroux) for Queen of Hearts. Two winkie guards (Aidan Ryder and Dotan Ryder) for the Wicked Witch. Cameos: Alice (Emily Kinney), Mad Hatter (Ryan McCartan), Tweedledum and Tweedledee (Reggie De Leon and Jason Rogel) (returning from the previous rap battle).
11	"Harley Quinn & Birds of Prey"	5:39	February 15, 2020	10	
Harley Quinn (Mary Kate Wiles), Black Canary (SWOOP), Huntress (Avalon) Cameos: Roman Sionis (Brandon Firby), Thugs (Colton Mastro and Gerardo Vitale)
12	"Fischl vs Mona"	3:29	December 30, 2022	1.7	
Fischl (Briana White), Mona (Anna Akana) Backup: Barbara (Kelsey Marie Edwards) and Klee (Kim Dalton) for Fischl. Lisa (Dani Scott) and Jean (Karalynn Dunton) for Mona. Cameos: Katheryne (Avalon), Oz (Jonathan Regier)
13	"Ariel vs Moana"	3:51	July 18, 2026	1.1	
Ariel (Avalon) from The Little Mermaid and Moana (Janaya Mahealani Jones) from Moana face off against each other. Prince Eric (Cole Gerdes) and Maui (Geoff Bisente), Ariel's husband and Moana's voyager guide, respectively, participate in the rap battle. Cameos: Alyssa Preston as Ursula

Avalon has created numerous parody music videos particularly of Disney releases and TV shows such as Rick and Morty and The Good Place.

== Appearance in other media ==
Avalon is a working actress in television, theater, and commercials. In 2013, she played the mom in the controversial Cheerios commercial "Just Checking", featuring an interracial family. She has appeared in television series such as St. Denis Medical, Speechless, Outlaw, The Big Bang Theory, Days of Our Lives, Monday Mornings, Girl Meets World, Love That Girl!, and Jane the Virgin. She played Mary Shelley in Edgar Allan Poe's Murder Mystery Dinner Party and was a series regular in Hyperlinked, a YouTube Premium series distributed by Disney.

As of 2025, Avalon is a songwriter for the Disney Channel animated series Phineas and Ferb.
