= Splinterheads =

- Theatrical release poster
- Directed by: Brant Sersen
- Written by: Brant Sersen
- Produced by: Darren Goldberg; Christopher Marsh; Anisa Qureshi
- Starring: Thomas Middleditch; Rachel Taylor; Christopher McDonald; Lea Thompson; Dean Winters; Frankie Faison; Jason Rogel
- Cinematography: Michael Simmonds
- Edited by: Chris Lechler
- Music by: John Swihart
- Distributed by: Paladin
- Release date: November 6, 2009
- Running time: 94 minutes
- Country: United States
- Language: English

Splinterheads is a 2009 American romantic comedy film written and directed by Brant Sersen and starring Thomas Middleditch, Rachael Taylor, Christopher McDonald and Lea Thompson. The film opened in limited release in the United States on November 6, 2009.

The film is about a young man, Justin Frost (Middleditch), who falls in love with Galaxy (Taylor), a splinterhead (someone who works at a carnival but is not a carny). The two go on their share of Geocaching adventures and in the end start dating. This aspect of the movie has caused it to develop a cult following among those who do geocaching as a hobby.

Schuylar Croom of the band He Is Legend makes a cameo in the film.

== Reception ==
On review aggregator website Rotten Tomatoes the film has a score of 27% based on reviews from 11 critics, with an average rating of 7.5/10.

Nick Schager of Slant Magazine gave Splinterheads .5 stars out of 4, explaining his reasoning as "Despite positioning itself as a Napoleon Dynamite-style comedy about a spazzy social retard, [the film] seems to have misplaced most of its jokes". Variety's Peter Debruge criticized the film for "Attempt[ing to compensate for its too-familiar romantic setup by defining its characters through idiosyncratic hobbies and traits".

Chris Nashawaty of Entertainment Weekly gave the film a "B−" and called the film "a quirkier Adventureland" which, according to him, "never rises above mildly amusing". Jeannette Catsoulis of The New York Times called Splinterheads "a shaggy comedy with more heart than heft".

According to Nick Pinkerton of The Village Voice, the film "[is] another tale of an overgrown kid accepted for his sweet, stammering self and nurtured out of his cocoon".
