= Josep =

Josep is a Catalan masculine given name equivalent to Joseph (Spanish José). People named Josep include:

- Josep Bargalló (born 1958), Catalan philologist and former politician
- Josep Bartolí (1910–1995), Catalan painter, cartoonist and writer
  - Josep (film), 2020 biopic film by Aurel detailing the life of Bartolí
- Josep Borrell (born 1947), Spanish politician
- Josep María Comadevall (born 1983), Spanish footballer commonly known as Pitu
- Josep or José Carreras (born 1946), Catalan tenor opera singer
- Josep Batlló i Casanovas (died 1934)
- Josep Comas i Solà (1868–1937), Spanish Catalan astronomer
- Josep Figueras (born 1959), Catalan health policy expert
- Josep Gombau (born 1976), Spanish football manager
- Josep "Pep" Guardiola (born 1971), Catalan football manager and former player
- Josep Llorens (1931–2025), Spanish writer
- Josep Llorens i Artigas (1892–1980), Spanish ceramic artist
- Josep Maria Margall (born 1955), Spanish retired basketball player
- José Marín (racewalker) (born 1950) (Catalan: Josep Marín i Sospedra), Spanish retired race walker
- Josep Maria Mauri (born 1941), Catalan Catholic priest, personal representative of the episcopal Co-Prince of Andorra
- Josep Pagès (born 1972), Catalan politician
- Josep Perarnau (1928–2026), Catalan priest, theologian and historian
- Josep Piqué (born 1955), Spanish politician, Spain's foreign minister from 2000 to 2002
- Josep Lluís Sert (1902–1983), Spanish architect and city planner
- Josep Soler i Sardà (1935–2022), Spanish composer, writer and music theorist
- Josep Yxart, Spanish literary critic, essayist and translator

== See also ==
- Joseph
- Josef (disambiguation)
- Jozef
- József
- Yosef (disambiguation)
