= Josef (surname) =

Josef is the surname of the following people:

- Jens Josef (born 1967), German composer of classical music, a flutist and academic teacher
- Michelle Josef (born 1954), Canadian musician and transgender activist
- Mikolas Josef (born 1995), Czech singer-songwriter, music producer and choreographer
- Waldemar Josef (born 1960), German footballer
