= Swamp Shark =

- DVD cover
- Directed by: Griff Furst
- Starring: Kristy Swanson; Christopher Berry; Wade Boggs

Production
- Cinematography: Lorenzo Senatore
- Running time: 85 minutes
- Production company: Active Entertainment

Original release
- Network: Syfy
- Release: June 25, 2011

Swamp Shark is a 2011 low budget American thriller film directed by Griff Furst and starring Kristy Swanson, D. B. Sweeney, Robert Davi, Jason Rogel, Sophia Sinise, Richard Tanne, and Jeff Chase. The film was produced by Kenneth M. Badish and Daniel Lewis and was written by Eric Miller, Charles Bolon, and Jennifer Iwen. It is a Syfy Channel original picture which premiered in the U.S. on the Syfy Channel on June 25, 2011.

== Plot ==
An animal smuggler accidentally releases a large shark into a swamp near a town, and the shark happens to like the taste of humans.

== Cast ==
- Kristy Swanson as Rachel Broussard
- D. B. Sweeney as Tommy Breysler
- Robert Davi as Sheriff Watson
- Jason Rogel as Martin
- Jeff Chase as Jason "Swamp Thing" Broussard
- Richard Tanne as Tyler
- Dylan Ramsey as Scott
- Sophia Sinise as Krystal Broussard
- Wade Boggs as Deputy Stanley
- Ashton Leigh as Amber
- Thomas Tah Hyde III as Marcus
- Charles Harrelson as Noah
- Natacha Itzel as Sarah
- Harold Evans as Jackson
- Lance E. Nichols as Simon
