= Josep Borrell =

Spanish politician (born 1947)

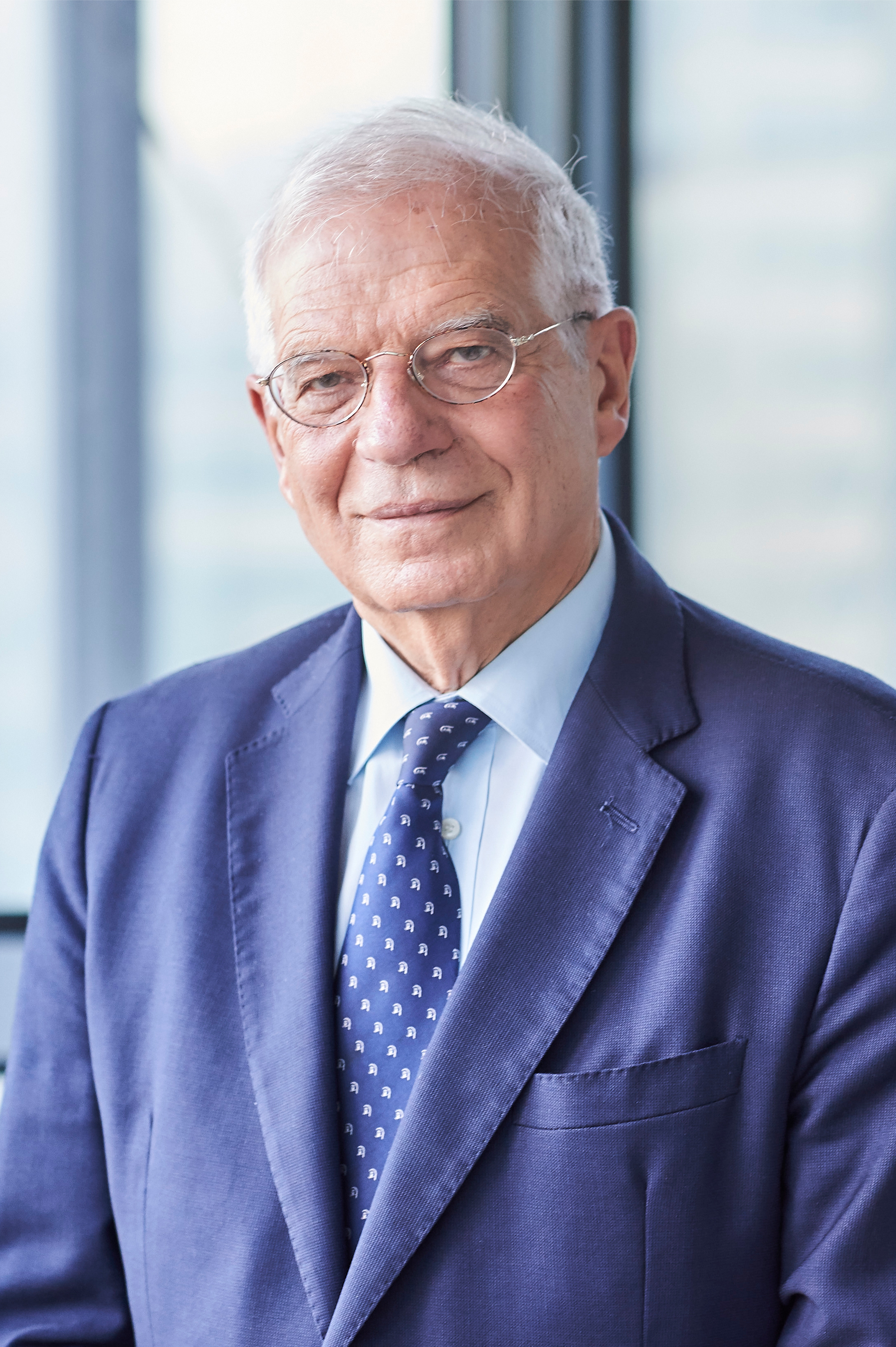
- Official portrait, 2020

Vice-President of the European Commission
- In office 1 December 2019 – 30 November 2024
- Commission: Von der Leyen I
- Preceded by: Federica Mogherini
- Succeeded by: Kaja Kallas

High Representative of the European Union for Foreign Affairs and Security Policy
- In office 1 December 2019 – 30 November 2024
- Preceded by: Federica Mogherini
- Succeeded by: Kaja Kallas

Minister of Foreign Affairs, European Union and Cooperation
- In office 7 June 2018 – 30 November 2019
- Prime Minister: Pedro Sánchez
- Preceded by: Alfonso Dastis (Foreign Affairs and Cooperation)
- Succeeded by: Margarita Robles (acting)

President of the European Parliament
- In office 20 July 2004 – 16 January 2007
- Preceded by: Pat Cox
- Succeeded by: Hans-Gert Pöttering

Minister of Public Works and Environment
- In office 12 March 1991 – 6 May 1996
- Prime Minister: Felipe González
- Preceded by: Javier Sáenz de Cosculluela
- Succeeded by: Rafael Arias-Salgado

Leader of the Opposition
- In office 26 May 1998 – 14 May 1999
- Prime Minister: José María Aznar
- Preceded by: Joaquín Almunia
- Succeeded by: Joaquín Almunia

Member of the European Parliament for Spain
- In office 13 June 2004 – 7 June 2009

Member of the Congress of Deputies
- In office 15 July 1986 – 2 April 2004
- Constituency: Barcelona

Personal details
- Born: Josep Borrell Fontelles; 24 April 1947 (age 79) La Pobla de Segur, Spain
- Citizenship: Spain; Argentina (since 2019)
- Party: Spanish Socialist Workers' (since 1975)
- Other political affiliations: Party of European Socialists
- Spouse(s): Carolina Mayeur (div.) Cristina Narbona (m. 2018)
- Children: 2
- Education: Technical University of Madrid (BS); Complutense University (PhD); Stanford University (MS); French Institute of Petroleum (Postgraduate)
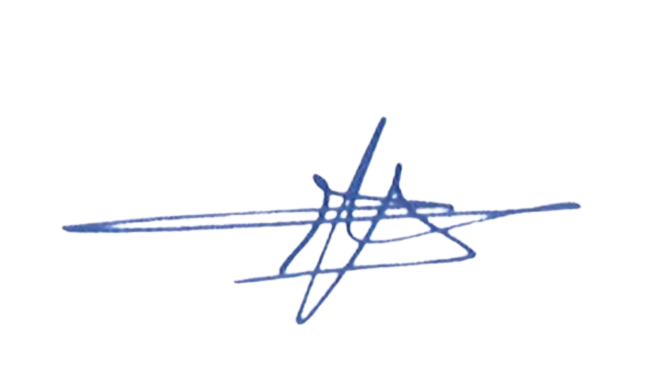
- Signature
- Josep Borrell's voice Borrell's speech following the Russian invasion of Ukraine; Recorded 24 February 2022

Josep Borrell Fontelles (Note: Western Catalan pronunciation: [dʒuˈzɛb boˈreʎ fonˈteʎes]) (born 24 April 1947) is a Spanish politician who served as High Representative of the Union for Foreign Affairs and Security Policy and Vice-President of the European Commission from 2019 to 2024. A member of the Spanish Socialist Workers' Party (PSOE), he served as President of the European Parliament from 2004 to 2007 and as Spain's Minister of Foreign Affairs, European Union and Cooperation from 2018 to 2019.

Born and raised in the Catalan village of La Pobla de Segur, Borrell is an aeronautical engineer and economist by training as well as a professor of mathematics. He entered politics in the 1970s as a member of the PSOE during Spain's transition to democracy, and went on to serve in several positions during the governments of Felipe González, first within the Ministry of Economy and Finance as Secretary-General for Budget and Public Expenditure (1982–1984) and Secretary of State for Finance (1984–1991), then joining the Council of Ministers as Minister of Public Works and Transport (1991–1996). In the opposition after the 1996 election, Borrell unexpectedly won the PSOE primary in 1998 and became Leader of the Opposition and the designated prime ministerial candidate of the party until he resigned in 1999. He then switched to European politics, becoming a Member of the European Parliament (MEP) during the 2004–2009 legislative period and serving as President of the European Parliament for the first half of the term.

He returned to the Council of Ministers in June 2018, when he was appointed Minister of Foreign Affairs, the European Union and Cooperation in the Sánchez government. In July 2019, Borrell was announced as the European Council's nominee to be appointed High Representative of the Union for Foreign Affairs and Security Policy. He took office in December 2019.

== Early life and career ==
Josep (or José) (Note: He has authored books using both variants of the name (José and Josep). He is sometimes hypocoristically referred to as 'Pepe' Borrell.) Borrell Fontelles was born on 24 April 1947 in the Catalan village of La Pobla de Segur, province of Lleida, near the Pyrenees, son of Joan Borrell (father) and Luisa Fontelles Doll (mother). He grew up in the village, where his father owned a small bakery. His paternal grandparents were Spanish immigrants in Argentina, where they ran a bakery in the city of Mendoza, close to the General San Martín Park. They returned to Spain when Joan Borrell, Josep's father, was eight years old. Borrell's father arrived in Spain just before the outbreak of the Spanish Civil War and afterwards he would never leave his village of La Pobla de Segur.

After completing primary education, the remote location of his village led Josep Borrell to be home-schooled with aid from his mother and a retired teacher, taking the official Baccalaureate exams at the Lleida high school. He continued his higher education thanks to several scholarships, including from the Juan March Foundation and the Fulbright Program. In 1964 he moved to Barcelona to study industrial engineering, but left after a year in 1965 to study aeronautical engineering at the Technical University of Madrid (UPM), graduating in 1969. In the summer of 1969 Borrell worked as volunteer at the Gal On kibbutz in Israel, where he met his future French wife Caroline Mayeur, from whom he is now divorced.

During this time, he also began to study for a bachelor's degree and later a PhD in economics at the Complutense University of Madrid (UCM). Borrell also holds a master's degree in applied mathematics (operations research) from Stanford University in Palo Alto (California, US), and a postgraduate in energy economics from the French Institute of Petroleum in Paris (France). In May 1976 Borrell defended his PhD thesis in economics at the UCM.

From 1972 to 1982 he lectured in mathematics at the Higher Technical School of Aeronautical Engineering of the UPM. In 1982 he was appointed associate professor of Business Mathematics at the University of Valladolid. From 1975 to 1982 he also worked for Cepsa, employed at the company's Department of Systems and Information Engineering; he combined this activity with the teaching of university classes and involvement in local politics.

== Political career ==
=== Involvement in local politics ===
Borrell joined the Spanish Socialist Workers' Party (PSOE) in 1975 and started his political activity during Spain's transition to democracy in the Socialist Grouping of Madrid along with Luis Solana and Luis Carlos Croissier. He ran for office as the number 5 in the PSOE list for the 1979 municipal election in Majadahonda, becoming city councillor. Borrell also became a member of the 1979–1983 corporation of the Provincial Deputation of Madrid and managed the Financial Department of the provincial government body in the pre-autonomic period.

=== Role during the González's governments ===
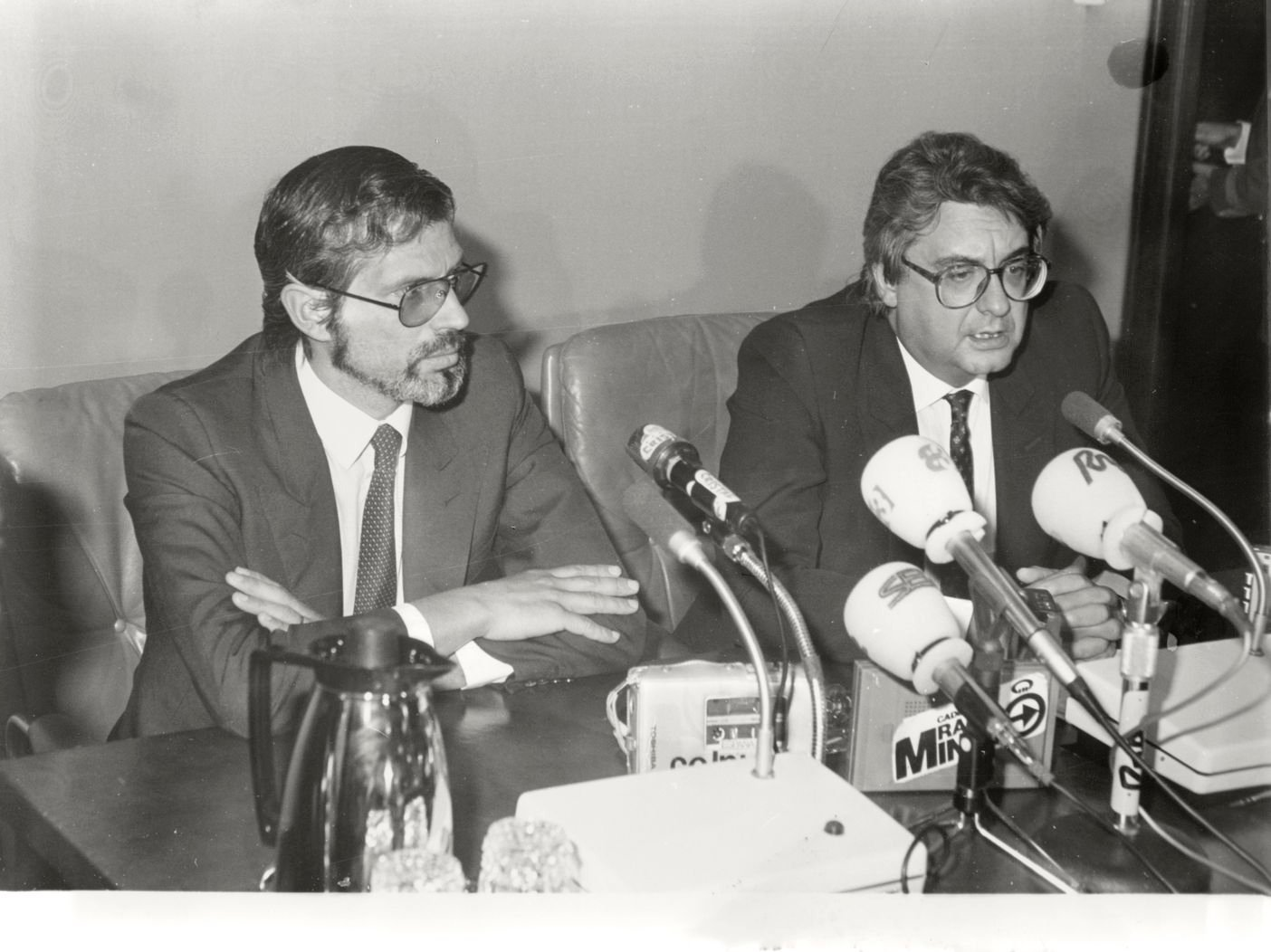
Borrell, Secretary of State of Finance, next to Eduardo Sotillos, Spokesman of the Government, in La Moncloa, 1984

In the 1982 general election the PSOE won a landslide victory, returning the socialists to power for the first time since the years of the Second Republic. Under Prime Minister Felipe González, Borrell was appointed to several prominent positions within the Ministry of Economy and Finance, first as Secretary-General for Budget and Public Expenditure (1982–1984), and then as Secretary of State for Finance (1984–1991). During his tenure as Secretary of State for Finance, Spain joined the European Economic Community in 1986. He became known for his actions seeking to combat fraud and tax evasion, going after the rich and famous, including celebrities such as Lola Flores, Marujita Díaz or Pedro Ruiz. In the 1986 general election he was for the first time elected to the Congress of Deputies, remaining as an MP representing Barcelona until 2004.

In 1991 he joined the Council of Ministers as Minister of Public Works and Transport.

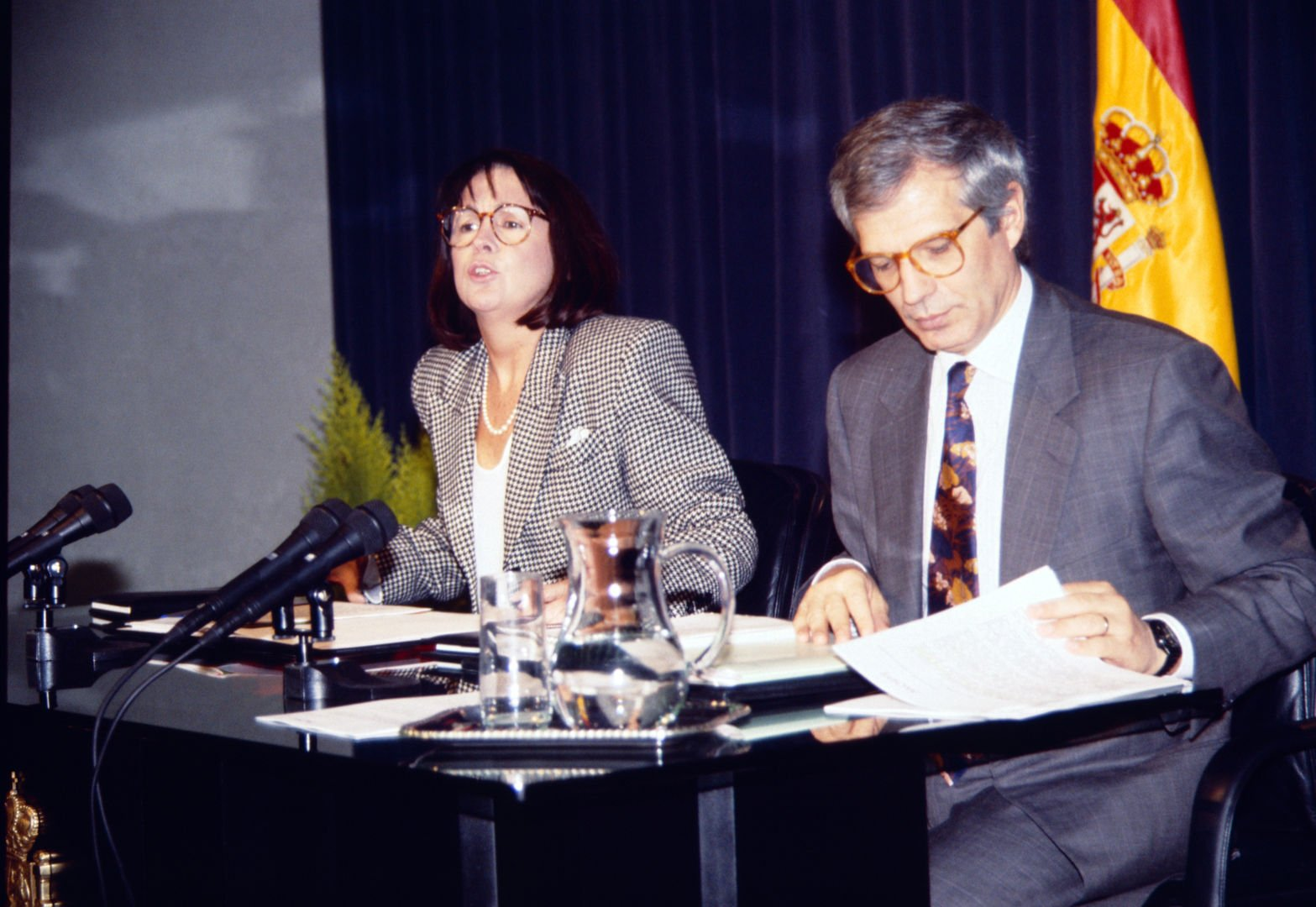
In 1991, next to Rosa Conde, during a joint press conference

He took a role in the process of liberalization of telecommunications in Spain, promoting the 1991–2001 National Plan of Telecommunications (PNT); in 1993, Borrell threatened nonetheless the European Commission with blocking the liberalization unless the concession of a moratory Spain was given, as Borrell deemed imperative to achieve first the universalization of service before the complete liberalization.

Following the 1993 general election, Borrell continued with a seat at the Council of Ministers, assuming the portfolio of Minister of Public Works, Transport and Environment in the last government presided by Felipe González. He left the office after the arrival to power of the People's Party in 1996, remaining as an MP for Barcelona in the Spanish Congress.

=== Brief spell as leader of the opposition ===
In 1998 Borrell decided to run against the PSOE's then party leader Joaquín Almunia in the first national primary election ever held in the PSOE since the Second Republic, intended to determine who the party would nominate as its prime ministerial candidate vis-à-vis the 2000 general election. Borrell ran as the underdog, campaigning as the candidate of the socialist base against the party establishment, and surprisingly won the voting, commanding 114,254 of the member's votes (54.99%), versus the 92,860 (44.67%) obtained by Almunia. Thus began an uneasy relationship and power-sharing—the "bicefalia" (duumvirate)—between the official party leader, Almunia, and the prime ministerial candidate elected by the members in the primaries, Borrell.

However, in May 1999, a fraud investigation was launched into two officials whom, several years earlier, Borrell had appointed to senior posts in the finance ministry. Though not involved in the inquiry into property purchases, Borrell resigned from the role of Prime Ministerial candidate, stating that he did not want the affair to damage his party's chances in the upcoming local and general elections.

=== Involvement in European politics ===
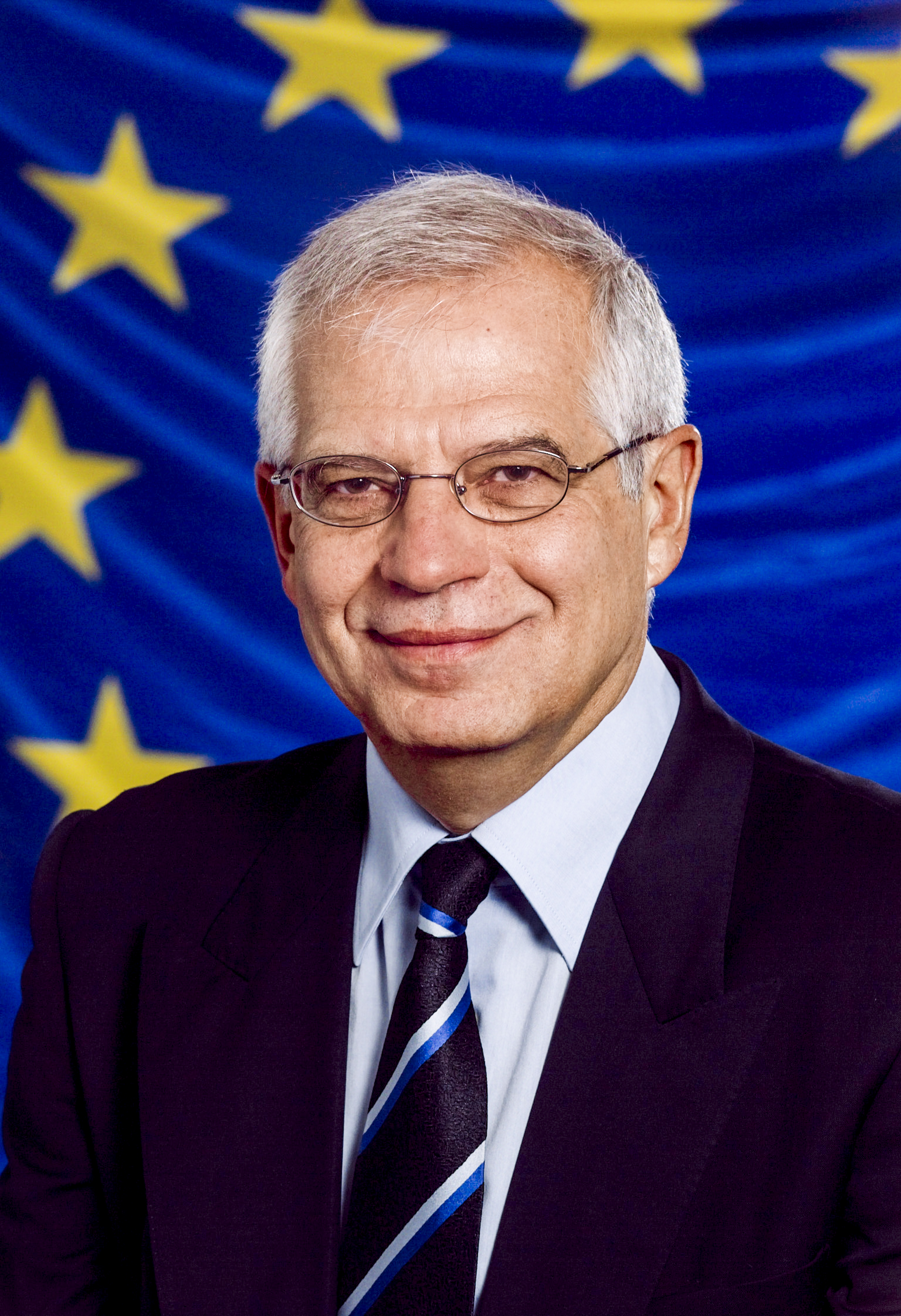
Borrell's official portrait as President of the European Parliament, 2004

Amid the sixth term of the Cortes Generales, Borrell was elected to chair the Joint Congress-Senate Committee on the European Union in October 1999, replacing Pedro Solbes. Reelected as MP for Barcelona in the 2000 general election, Borrell repeated as president of the Joint Committee for the European Union for the full 7th parliamentary term. Then, in 2001, Borrell was also appointed the Spanish parliament's representative on the Convention on the Future of Europe. In 2011 he was awarded Spain's medal of the Order of Constitutional Merit in recognition of his participation in this convention, which drafted the European Constitution that eventually led to the Treaty of Lisbon. During his time at the convention, he unsuccessfully pushed for a mention to a "federal model" in the draft, as well as he advocated for the explicit mention of the equality between women and men. A laicist, he also then opposed the inclusion of the notion of a "Christian heritage" in the text.

In 2004, the prime minister and PSOE's leader José Luis Rodríguez Zapatero proposed Borrell to lead the Socialist Ticket in the 2004 European elections. The PSOE won the elections with 6,6 million votes (43,30%), obtaining 25 MEP seats, although turnout was relatively low at 46%. Borrell sat with the Party of European Socialists (PES) group, and served as leader of the Spanish delegation.

In July 2004 Borrell was elected President of the European Parliament, as a result of an agreement between the EPP and the Socialists, becoming the third Spaniard to hold this position after Enrique Barón and José María Gil-Robles. In the presidential vote, out of 700 Members of the European Parliament (MEPs) he received an absolute majority with 388 votes in the first ballot. The other two candidates were the Polish Liberal Bronisław Geremek (208 votes) and the French communist Francis Wurtz (51 votes). He was the first newly elected MEP to hold the post since direct elections were held in 1979. As part of a deal with the conservative faction in the parliament, the EPP, he was succeeded as president of the parliament by the German conservative politician Hans-Gert Pöttering in the second part of the five-year term.

In his capacity as president, Borrell also chaired the Parliament's temporary committee on policy challenges and budgetary means of the enlarged Union 2007–2013. From 2007 until leaving the Parliament in 2009, he served as chairman of the Committee on Development. In addition to his committee assignments, he was a member of the Parliament's delegation to the ACP–EU Joint Parliamentary Assembly.

=== Step back from the political front ===
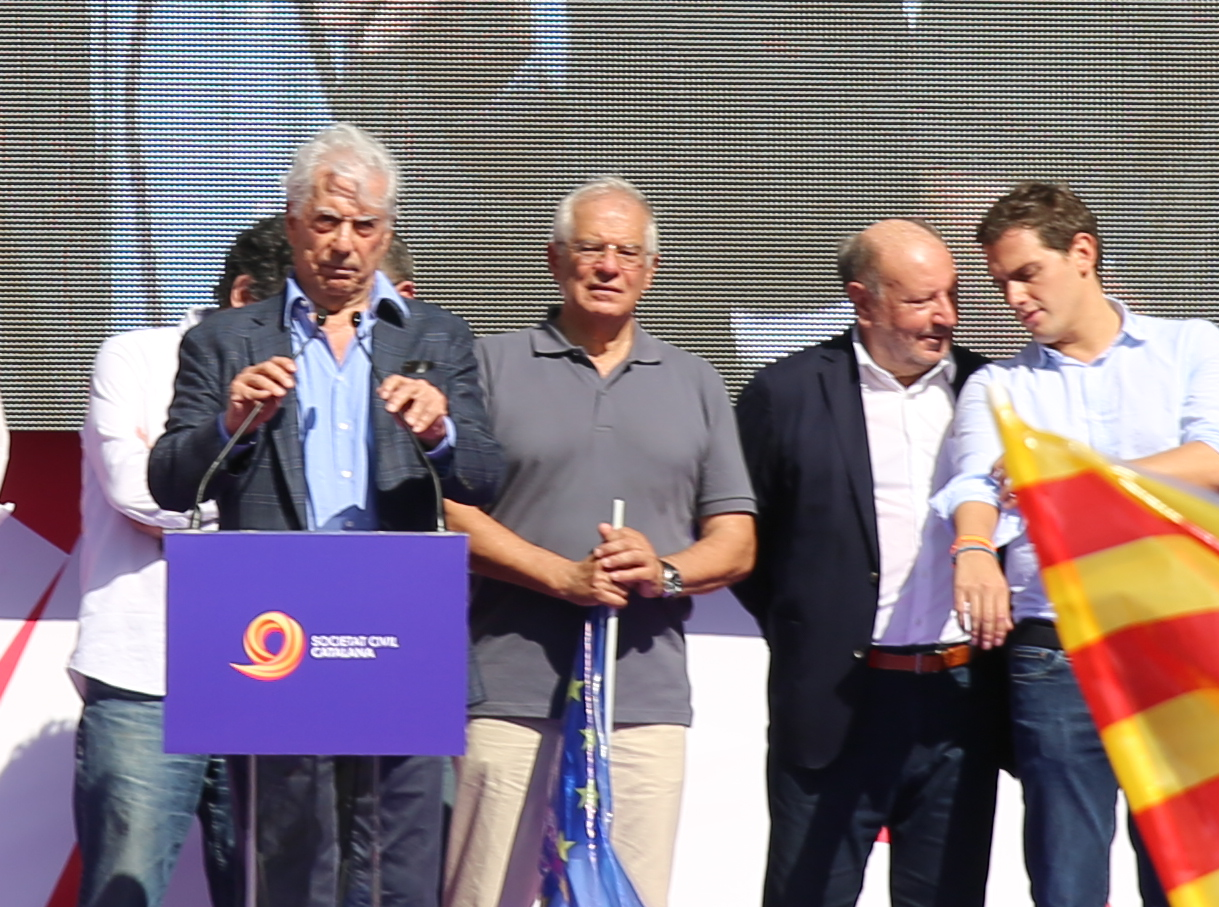
Borrell holding an EU flag, between Mario Vargas Llosa and Albert Rivera during a mass rally defending the unity of Spain held in Barcelona on 8 October 2017

Borrell was nominated president of the European University Institute on 12 December 2008, and assumed this position in January 2010. In 2012, he was forced to resign after failing to disclose a financial relationship with Abengoa, which paid him €300,000 yearly as a board member for the company.

In 2012, the University of Lleida appointed Borrell to a professorship of competition and regional development sponsored by energy company Repsol. He also held the Jean Monnet Chair at the Institute of International Studies at Complutense University of Madrid.

Borrell collaborated along with other prominent PSOE figures, such as Cristina Narbona, José Félix Tezanos and Manuel Escudero, in the making of Somos socialistas. Por una nueva socialdemocracia ("We are socialists. For a new social-democracy"), a manifesto in support of Pedro Sánchez's successful bid to the leadership of the PSOE in the May 2017 PSOE primary election prior to the 39th Federal Congress of the party.

He also stood out as one of the most outspoken opponents of Catalan secessionism. Borrell co-authored Las cuentas y los cuentos de la independencia ("The calculations and tales behind independence"), a 2015 essay that vowed to dismantle the economic arguments laid out by the pro-independence movement. He also took a leading role in a mass rally defending the unity of Spain held in Barcelona on 8 October 2017, in which Borrell gave an impassionated speech demanding "not to bring up more frontiers" while displaying a European Union flag that he called "our estelada" (starred flag), bringing him back to the media first line. He also took part on a second mass rally on 29 October 2017 under the slogan "We are all Catalonia".

=== Foreign Minister, 2018–2019 ===
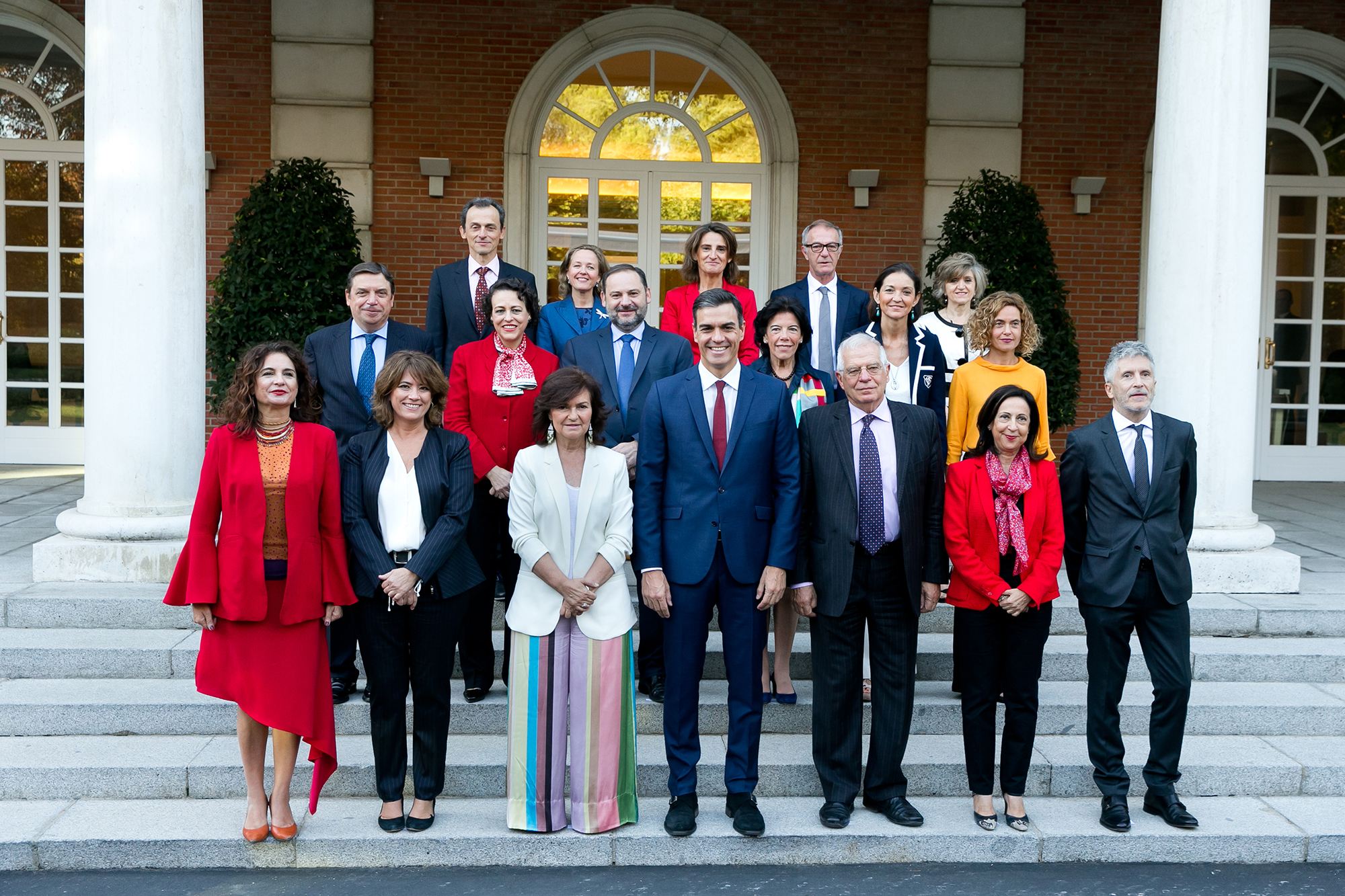
Group photo presenting the new Council of Ministers at La Moncloa (June 2018)

Following the 2018 successful motion of no confidence against Mariano Rajoy and subsequent investiture of Pedro Sánchez as new prime minister, Borrell was announced on 5 June as Sánchez's choice for the post of foreign minister in his new government. 22 years after the end of his last tenure as member of the Government of Spain, Borrell assumed the portfolio of Foreign Affairs, European Union and Cooperation on 7 June along the rest of the new cabinet in La Zarzuela. The new minister relocated some of the high-rank officials appointed by the government of Mariano Rajoy with a diplomatic background to ambassadorial posts, including secretaries of State and, most notably, the former foreign minister (Alfonso Dastis) and the prime minister's chief of staff (Jorge Moragas).

Borrell decided to reformulate the High Commissioner for the 'Marca España' (Spain Brand), a one-person body functionally dependent directly on the Office of the Prime Minister but organically included within the Foreign Office structure to the post of Secretary of State for Global Spain. The officeholder responsible for the 'Marca España' since 2012, The Marquess of Valtierra, was replaced by Irene Lozano.

In June 2018, Borrell accompanied King Felipe VI on an official visit to the US. Borrell had a meeting with Mike Pompeo, where the Spanish delegation expressed concern over the US protectionist drift; discrepancies were found between the two countries in their approach to migration policies.

In September 2018, the National Securities Market Commission (CNMV) settled a disciplinary action against Borrell opened in 2017 due to the latter's insider trading in the sale of stocks of Abengoa (whose board of directors Borrell was a member of) in November 2015, sanctioning him with a fine of 30,000€. (Note: Borrell admitted the events but he differed in the interpretation by the CNMV, arguing that if he had used insider information he would not have lost all the parcel of shares, as it happened.)

Regarding the negotiations with the United Kingdom on Gibraltar in the context of Brexit, Borrell vowed to prioritise improvement of the living conditions in neighbouring Campo de Gibraltar (he reportedly considered the reality of the "3rd territory with the highest GDP per capita in the World"—Gibraltar—surrounded by "a flatland of underdevelopment"—the Campo de Gibraltar—as something unacceptable). On the other hand, he renounced attempts to include the longstanding bid for sovereignty as an element of the negotiations. Borrell highlighted the fact that this soft approach was the same stance used by his predecessor, Dastis, outlining a continuity in the negotiations with the former government, with the ministry keeping the same negotiating team as before the government change. In November 2018, he signed four MoUs negotiated with the United Kingdom, settling aspects of the future relationship with the British Overseas Territory.

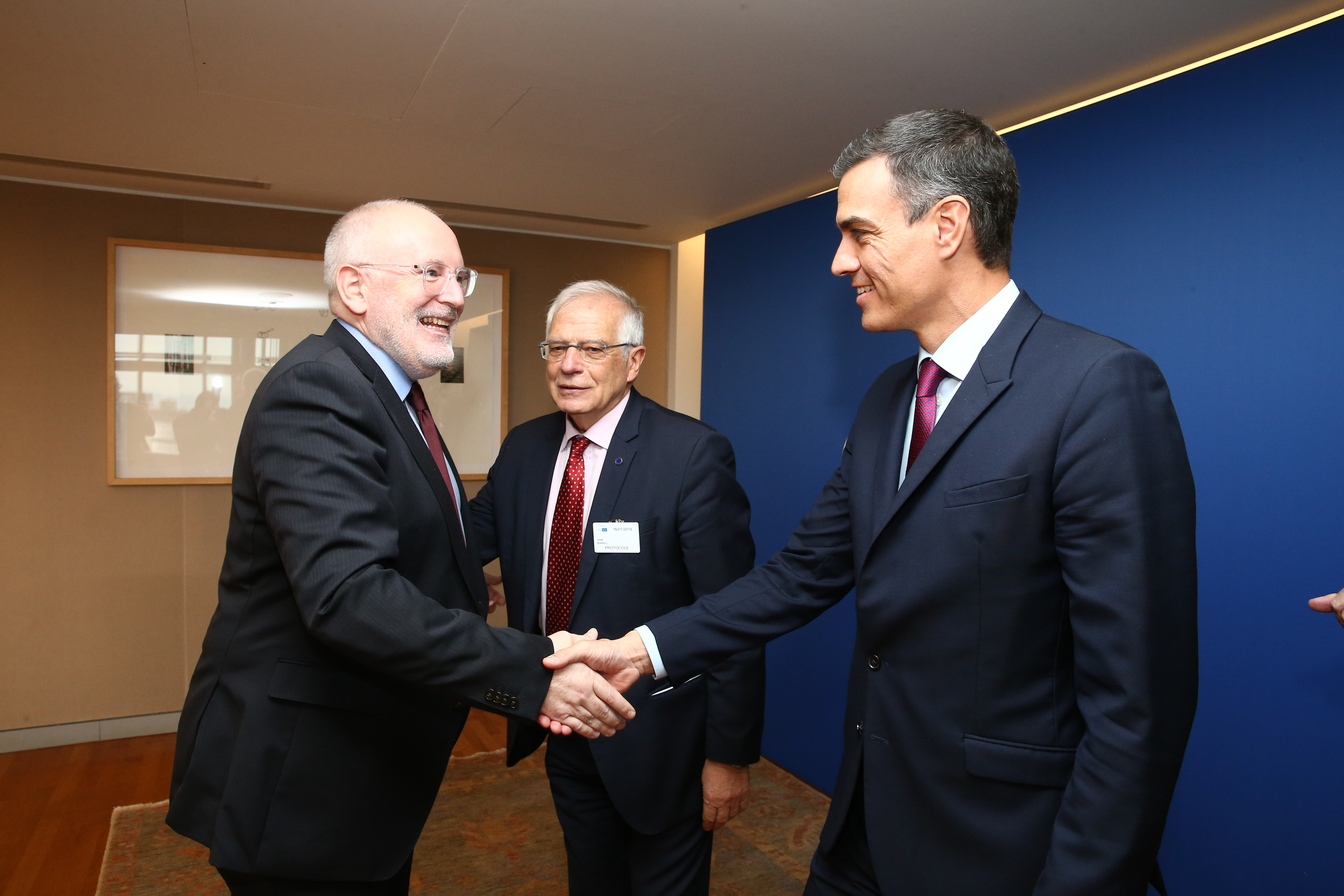
Borrell (centre) with PES Spitzenkandidat Frans Timmermans and Pedro Sánchez in January 2019

Given the aggravation of the political crisis in Nicaragua, in December 2018 Borrell pressed EU High Representative for Foreign Affairs Federica Mogherini for EU-wide involvement in the situation.

In May 2019, the Spanish Embassy in Caracas lodged Venezuelan dissident Leopoldo López as a guest following the Venezuelan uprising, as the latter had been freed from domiciliary imprisonment by forces endorsing Juan Guaidó. However, Borrell warned Spain was not going "to allow the embassy to become a centre of political activism", vowing to restrict the political activities of López as a guest.

For the 2019 European Parliament election in Spain, Borrell ran first in the PSOE list. During the electoral campaign, he appealed to the unity of Europe and stressed the need for EU member states to pool sovereignty in order to survive as a civilization. Shortly after his election, he gave up his newly won seat before the inaugural session of the legislature, arguing that acting prime minister Pedro Sánchez and he had agreed that, amid the uncertainty regarding the second investiture of Sánchez, the post of foreign minister should not be left vacant for an indefinite period.

In October 2019, Borrell condemned the Turkish offensive into north-eastern Syria against Syrian Kurds, adding that "We don't have magic powers" to stop the Turkish invasion.

He stepped down from the office on 29 November 2019 and was succeeded ad interim by the Minister of Defence, Margarita Robles.

=== European Union High Representative for Foreign Affairs and Security Policy ===
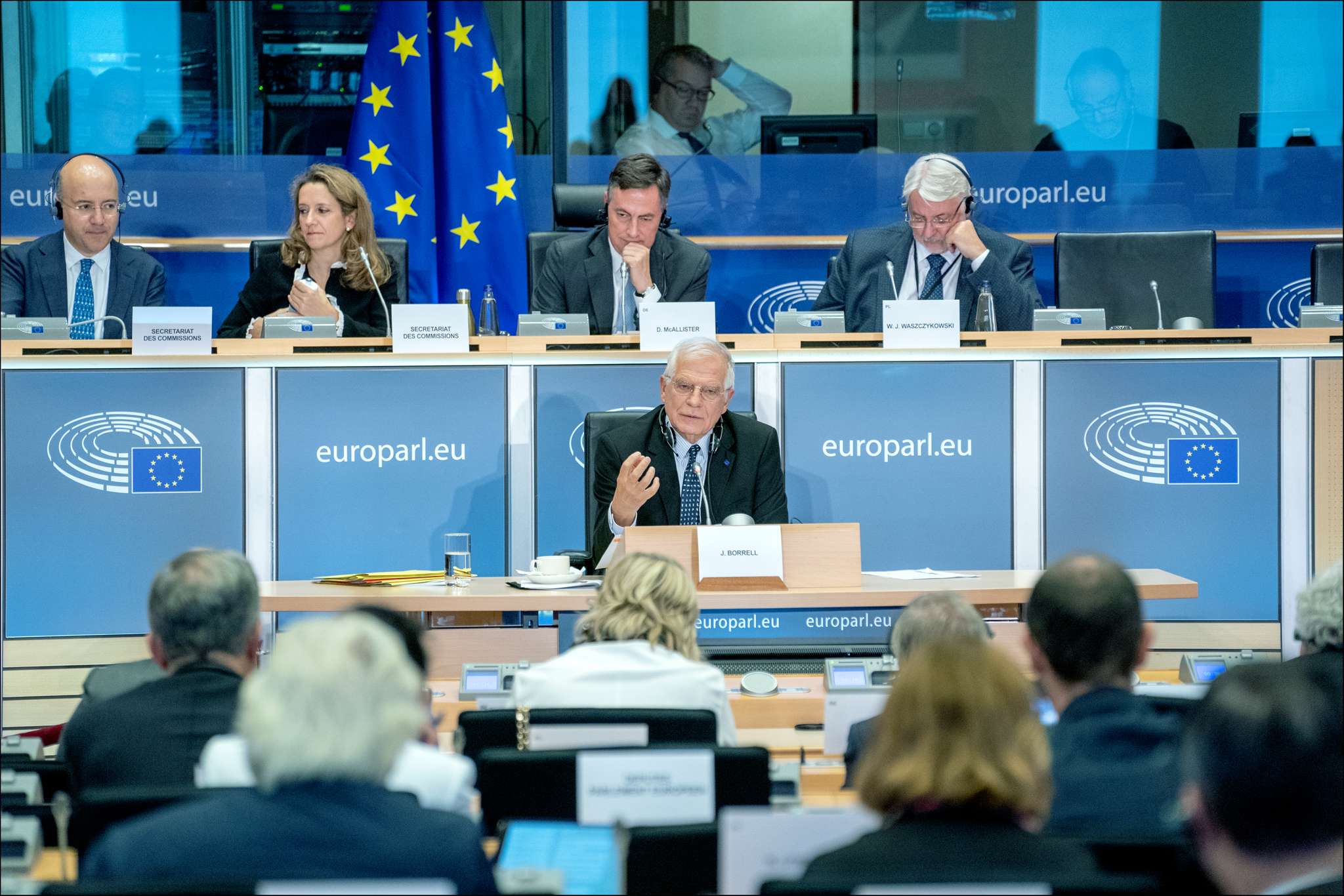
Borrell testifies before the EP Committee on Foreign Affairs in 2019 in a hearing for his confirmation as High Representative.

==== 2019 ====
On 2 July 2019, President of the European Council Donald Tusk announced that the European Council would nominate Josep Borrell as High Representative of the Union for Foreign Affairs and Security Policy. The portfolio had been reportedly beefed up with additional responsibilities in humanitarian aid, support of development policies in Africa and the external dimension of immigration. Also in July 2019, he announced the acquisition of double Argentine–Spanish citizenship, assumed on 18 July 2019, thus gaining the citizenship his father was born with. He passed the hearing before the European Parliament Committee on Foreign Affairs (AFET) on 7 October 2019. His nomination was green-lighted the next day by a vote of AFET members.

To counter its negative image in the EU, China sent medical aid and supplies to EU countries affected by the COVID-19 pandemic. Borrell warned that there is "a geopolitical component, including a struggle for influence through spinning and the 'politics of generosity'." He also said that "China is aggressively pushing the message that, unlike the US, it is a responsible and reliable partner."

==== 2020 ====
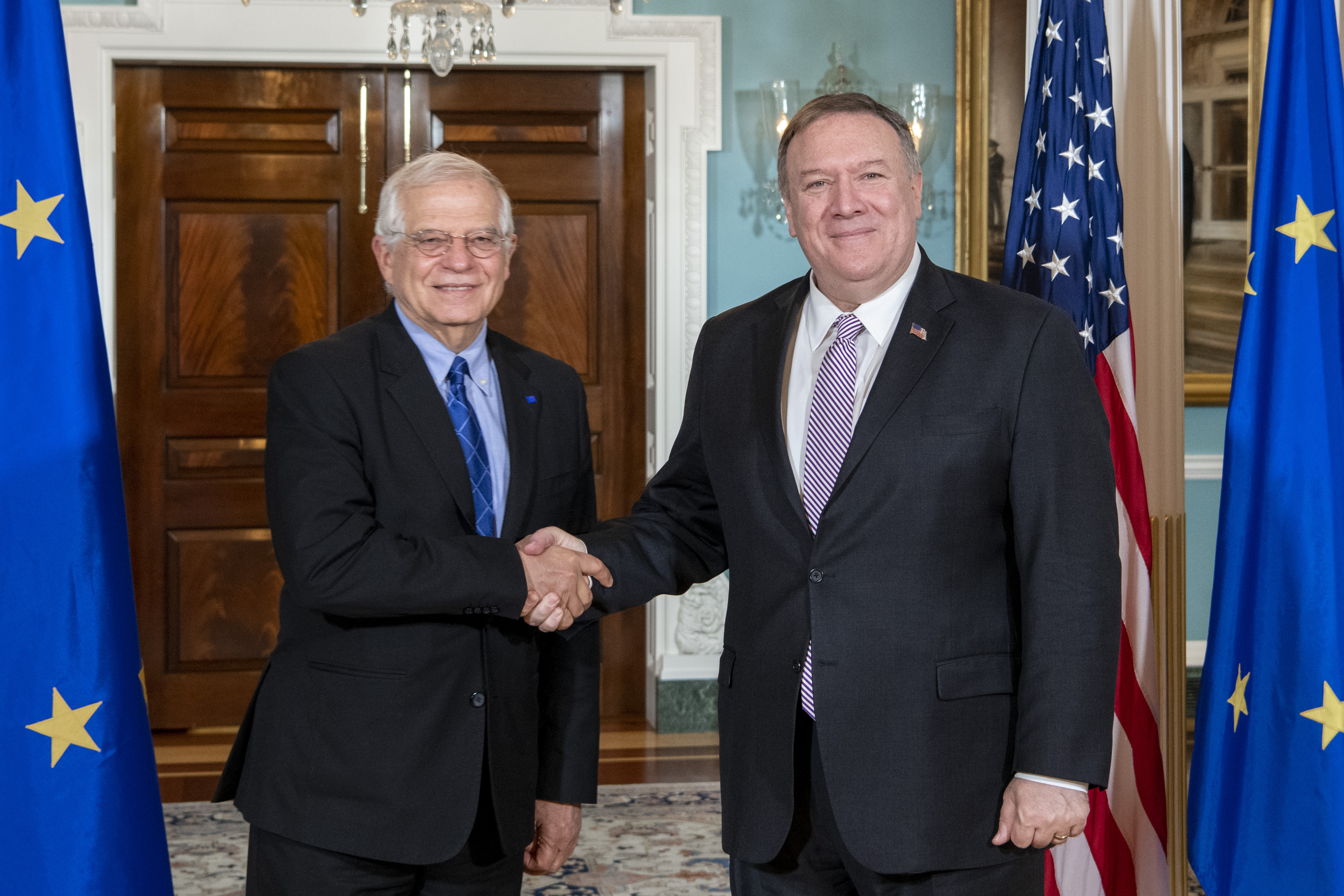
Borrell with U.S. Secretary of State Mike Pompeo on 7 February 2020

Borrell said that proposed Israeli annexation of the West Bank "could not pass unchallenged" and warned that "failure to adequately respond would encourage other states with territorial claims to disregard basic principles of international law". He said that "In line with international law and relevant U.N. Security Council resolutions, the EU does not recognize Israel's sovereignty" over the Palestinian territories occupied since 1967. Borrell hailed the peace agreement between Israel and the United Arab Emirates as benefiting both nations and being important for stability in the Middle East. He also called Israeli suspension of its annexation plans positive and stated that the European Union hoped for a two-state solution.

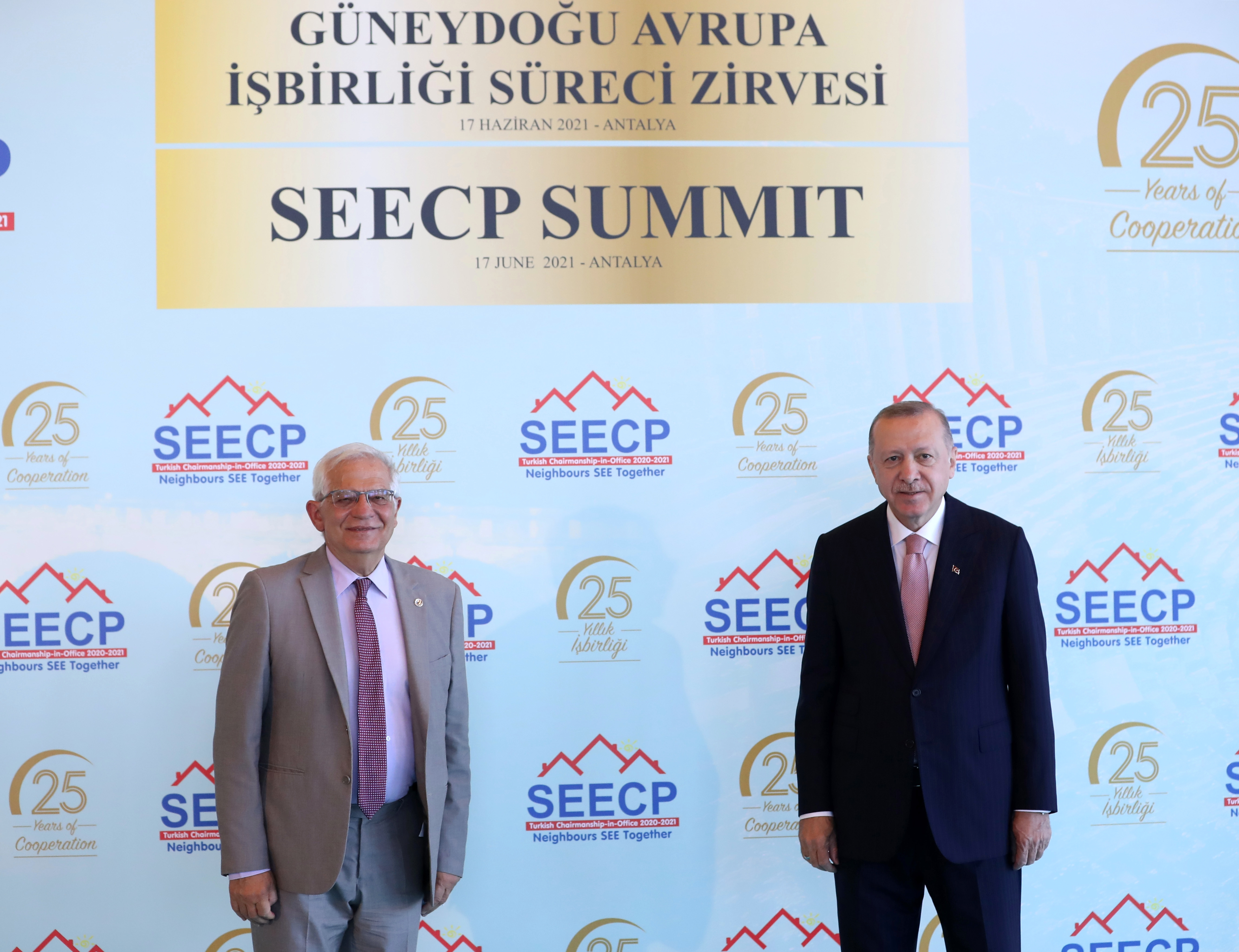
Borrell and Turkish President Recep Tayyip Erdoğan at the South-East European Cooperation Process (SEECP) Summit in Antalya, Turkey on 17 June 2021

On 9 April 2020, Borrell, on behalf of the EU, with the release of the first report of the Investigation and Identification Team to the Executive Council of the Organisation for the Prohibition of Chemical Weapons and to the Secretary-General of the United Nations on 8 April 2020, declared that "We fully support the report's findings and note with great concern its conclusions. The European Union strongly condemns the use of chemical weapons by the Syrian Arab Air Force as concluded by the report. Those identified as responsible for the use of chemical weapons must be held accountable for these reprehensible acts."

On 24 April, the EU's foreign security policy agency, the European External Action Service (EEAS), published a report on disinformation related to the COVID-19 pandemic. The New York Times reported that the language had been toned down amid criticism from China. The final report differed in key areas from both an internal version and an earlier draft planned for public release. At a parliamentary hearing on 30 April, Borrell acknowledged that China had expressed concerns about the report after it leaked, but he denied the EU had bowed to pressure or that the report had been revised. Borrell said that there were two separate reports, one for internal consumption and one for publication. Responding to questions from members of the European Parliament, Borrell accused staff of damaging the EU by leaking. He also appeared to suggest that analysts' views were biased and cast doubt on their credibility: "I cannot accept that the personal belief or feeling of a member of staff leaking mails—maybe being written to be leaked—created damage to the credibility of the institution", he said, later asking MEPs why "more credibility" was being given "to the personal opinion of a member of a staff".

Multiple EU officials told BuzzFeed News and The New York Times that they were angry and disappointed by Borrell's focus on leaks and, in particular, his singling out of junior staff members.

Concerning the long-standing Aegean dispute between Turkey and Greece, Borrell in August 2020 expressed "full solidarity" with Greece and Cyprus (Turkey has occupied northern Cyprus since July 1974) and called for "immediate deescalation" by Turkey and "reengaging in dialogue."

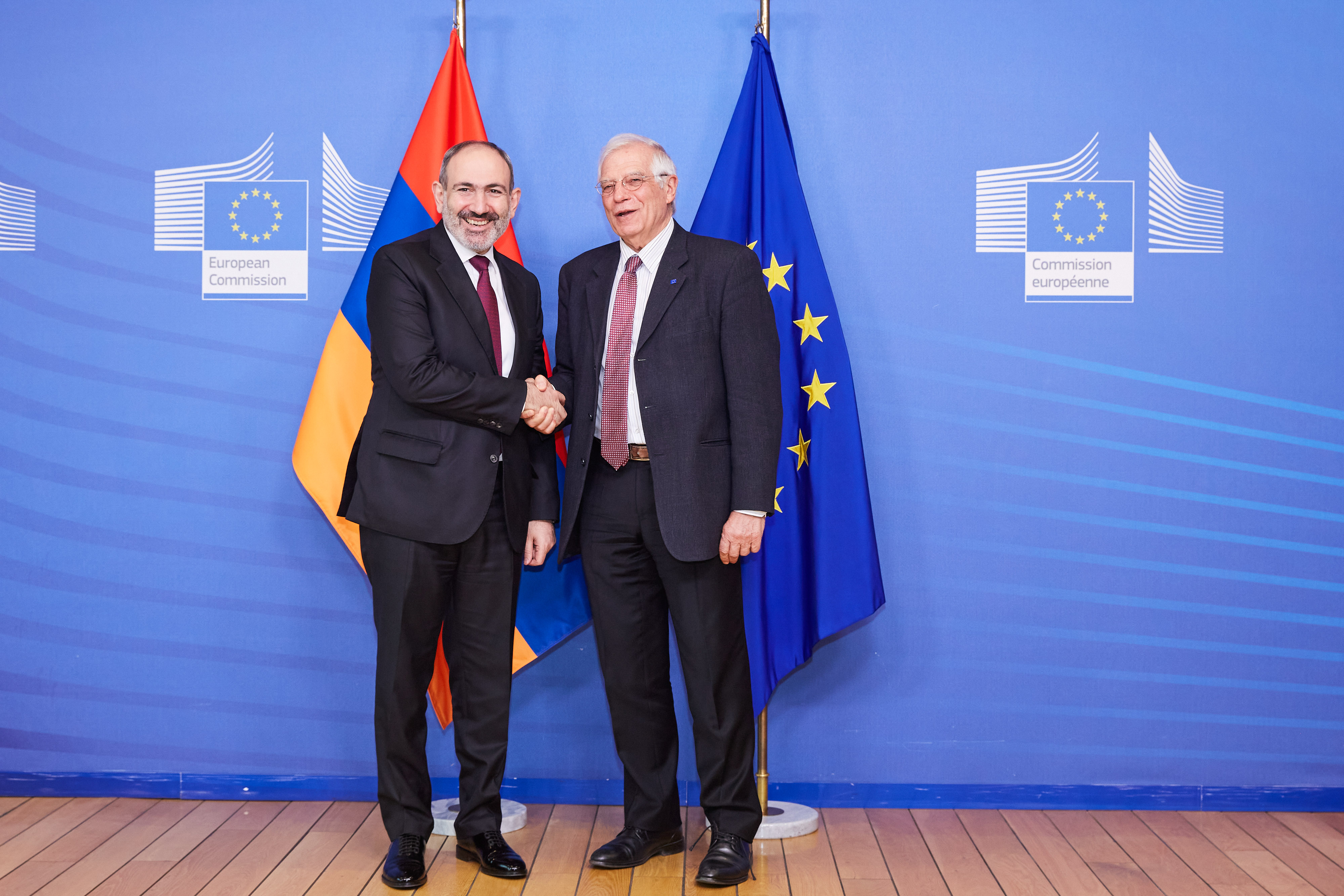
Borrell with Armenian Prime Minister Nikol Pashinyan on 9 March 2020

In October 2020, Borrell called on Armenia and Azerbaijan to cease fighting in the disputed Nagorno-Karabakh region and return to the negotiating table.

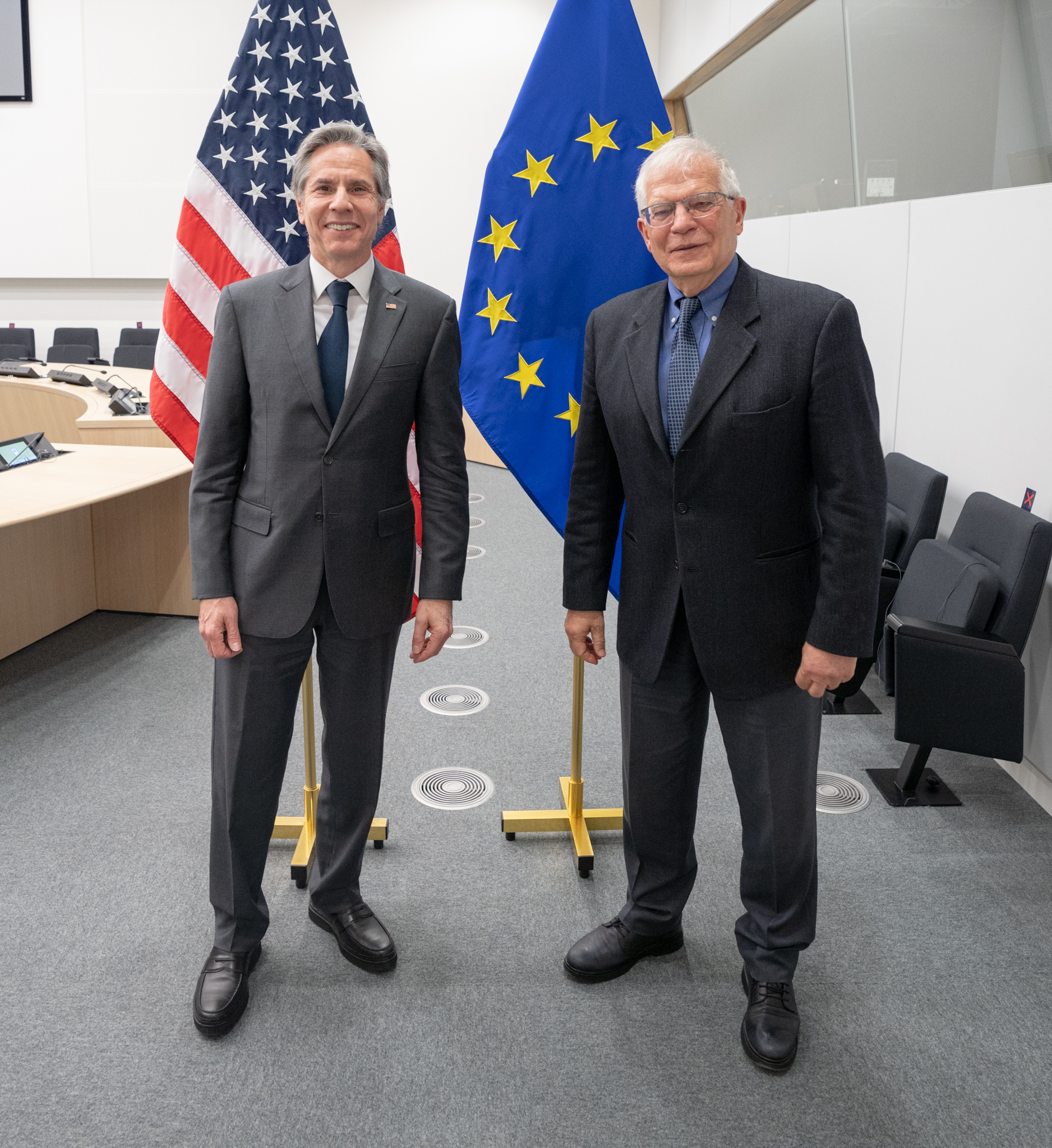
EU High Representative Josep Borrell with U.S. Secretary of State Antony Blinken in Triangle building, Brussels, 2022

==== 2021 ====
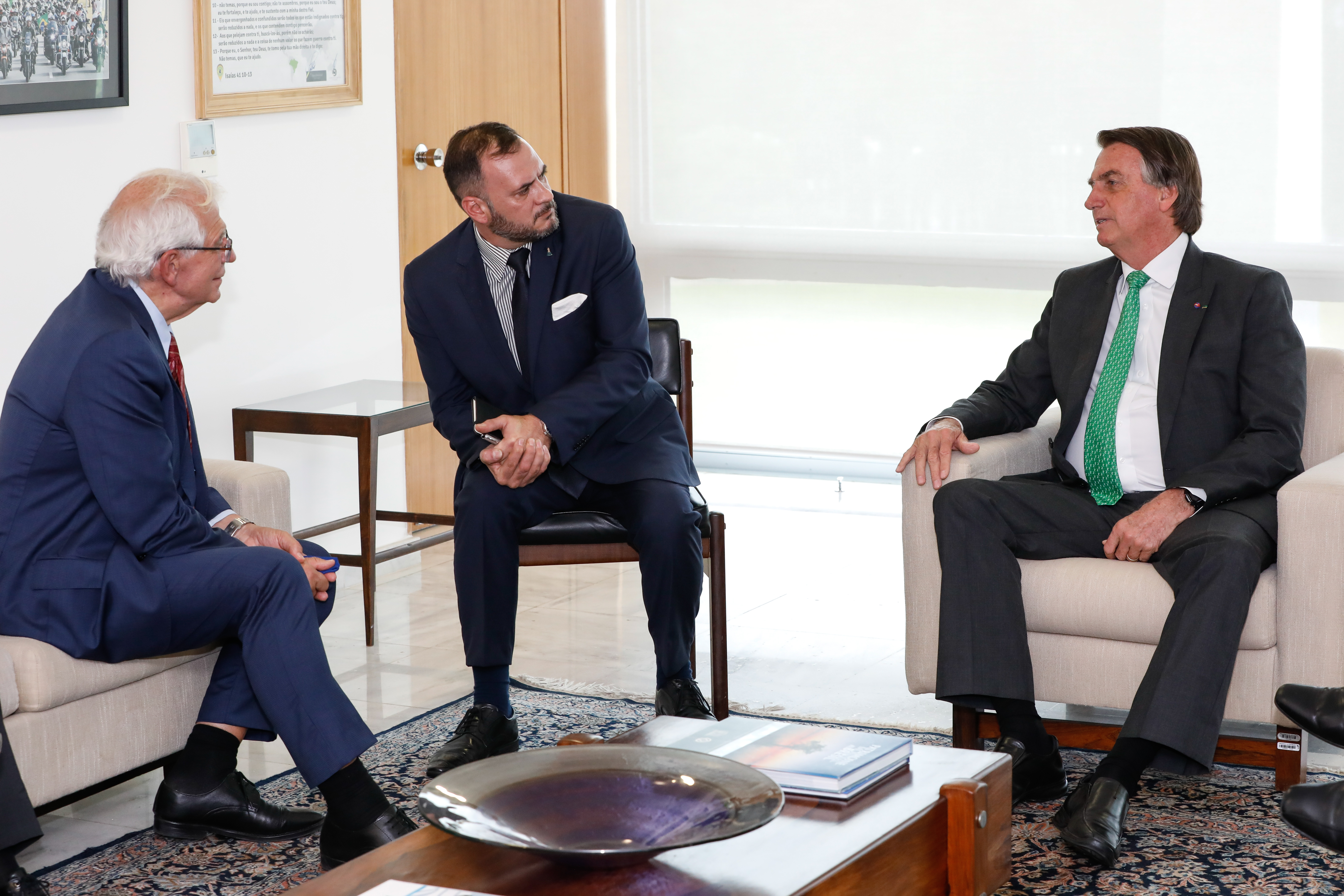
Borrell with Brazilian President Jair Bolsonaro in November 2021

In February 2021, Borrell voiced "strong concern" about China's "treatment of ethnic and religious minorities, in particular" ethnic Uyghurs in Xinjiang. In March 2021, he said China's sanctions on EU officials had created "a new atmosphere" and "a new situation".

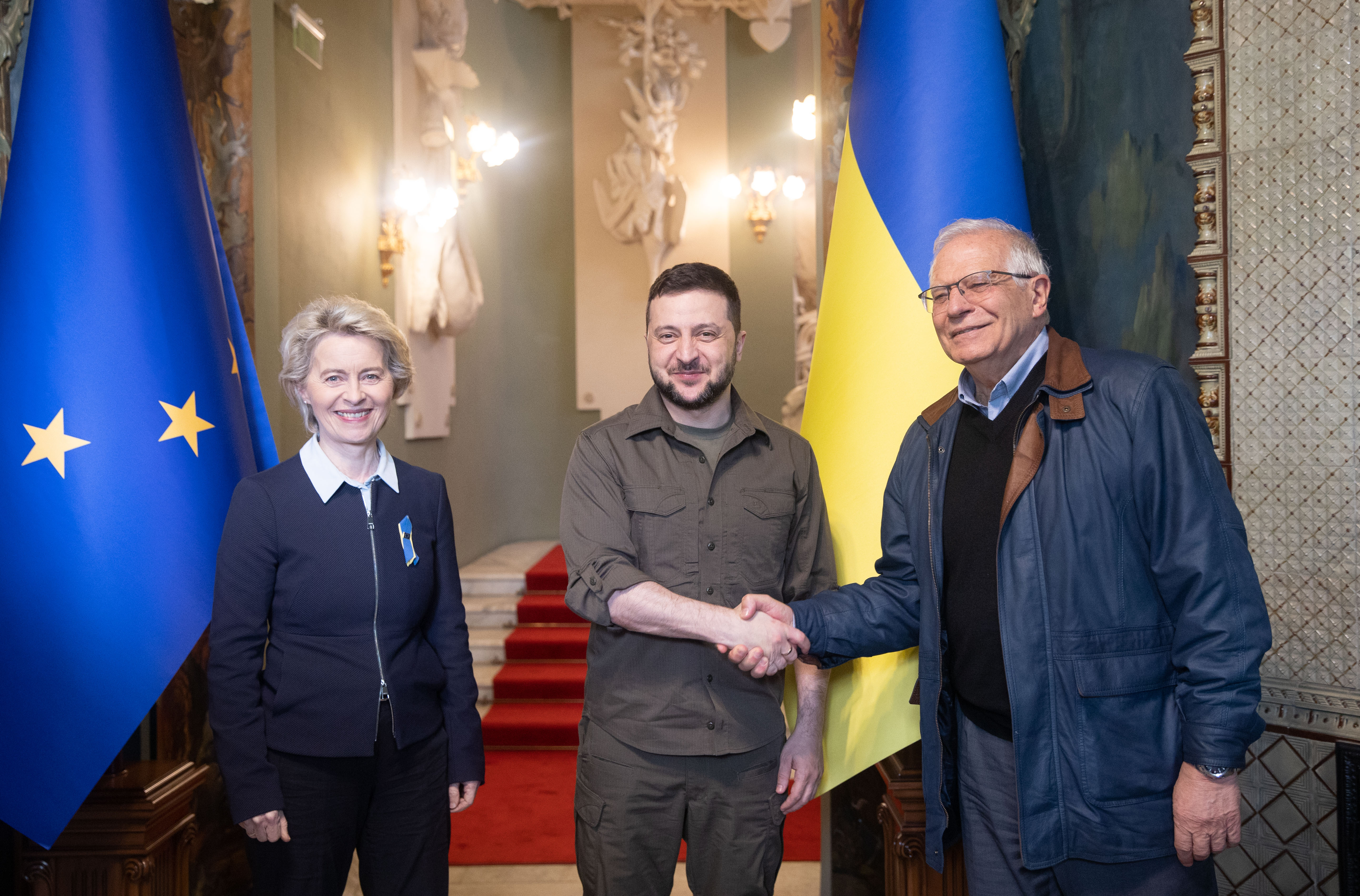
EU High Representative Josep Borrell with Ukrainian President Volodymyr Zelenskyy and European Commission President Ursula von der Leyen in Kyiv in April 2022

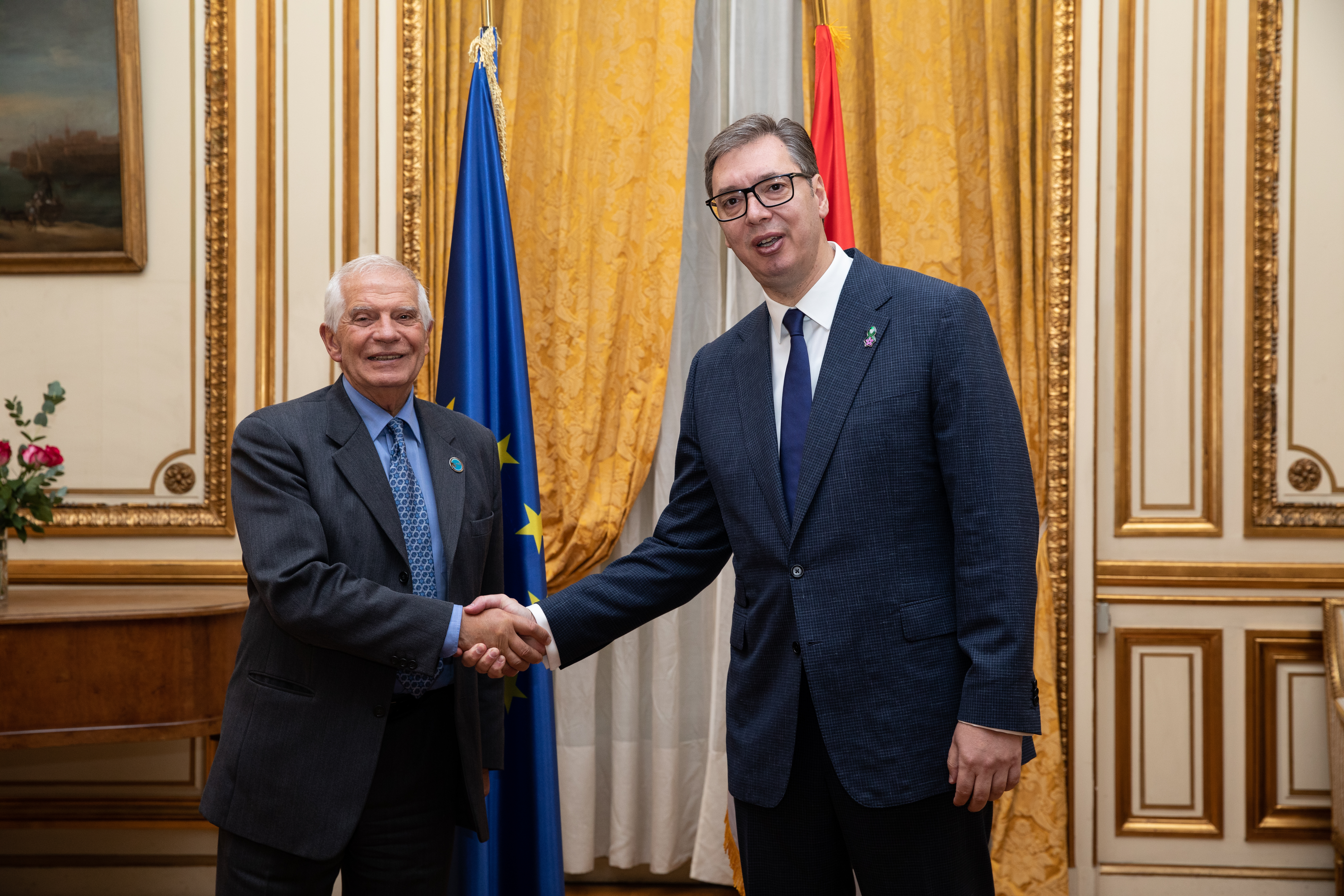
Borrell with Serbian President Aleksandar Vučić on 11 November 2022

Although warned against doing so by several EU countries, Borrell decided on his own initiative to make the first high-level EU trip of its type in four years to Russia amidst the 2021 Russian protests, to meet with Russian Foreign Minister Sergey Lavrov. The visit was described by MEPs, diplomats and other political observers as a humiliation for Borrell, as he stood by while Lavrov called the EU an "unreliable partner" and Russia expelled three EU diplomats while Borrell and Lavrov held their joint press briefing. This led to a group of over 70 MEPs to call for Borrell's resignation.

In May 2021, Borrell called for a ceasefire between Israel and the Palestinian Islamist group Hamas.

In June 2021, the Spanish newspaper ABC published a mail that described that Borrell had informed the Cuban embassy about the debate in the European Parliament about the situation in Cuba and that showed his intention to stop the debate and prevent it from reaching the Parliament's floor. A group of at least 16 MEPs asked Borrell for explanations.

In August 2021, Borrell received criticism for sending a high-ranking EU representative, Enrique Mora, to attend the inauguration of Iranian president Ebrahim Raisi. Mora was seated directly behind senior leaders of Hamas and Hezbollah during the ceremony. Borrell's decision to send him there was blasted by David Lega and eight other members of the European Parliament who sent Borrell a letter stating that his action "contradicts European commitments to uphold and stand for human rights." The MEPs also pointed to Raisi's role in the 1988 executions of Iranian political prisoners and warned that honoring the "inauguration of the 'Hangman of Tehran' only serves to encourage such behavior".

In September 2021, Borrell compared the situation on the Belarus–Poland border to the migrant crisis on the Morocco–Spain border.

In October 2021, he went to Saudi Arabia after visiting Qatar and the United Arab Emirates. Borrell said that the EU "now has human rights dialogues with all Gulf States and we launched such a dialogue with Saudi Arabia this week. This is an area where there is much to gain for both sides from closer cooperation." Borrell and Saudi Arabia's Foreign Minister Faisal bin Farhan Al Saud also discussed the conflict in Yemen and the humanitarian situation in Taliban-controlled Afghanistan. Borell described the situation in Yemen as a "terrible tragedy" and called for a peaceful solution to the war in Yemen, which is largely seen in the region as a proxy conflict between Iran and Saudi Arabia.

On 8 October 2021, Borrell said the EU's relations with Turkey has significantly improved and he called his relationship with Turkish President Recep Tayyip Erdoğan "excellent".

On 18 October 2021, Borrell argued that the 2021 global energy crisis had "deep geopolitical roots. ... the price of gas, the scarcity, is something that has to be looked at from a geopolitical perspective."

In December 2021, he criticised EU member states for not imposing sanctions on Ethiopia, which was accused of war crimes during the Tigray War. Borrell said the situation in Ethiopia was "one of my biggest frustrations" of the year because the EU was not able to react properly to the large-scale human rights violations, "mass rapes using sexual violence as a war arm, killings and concentration camps based on ethnic belonging."

==== 2022 ====
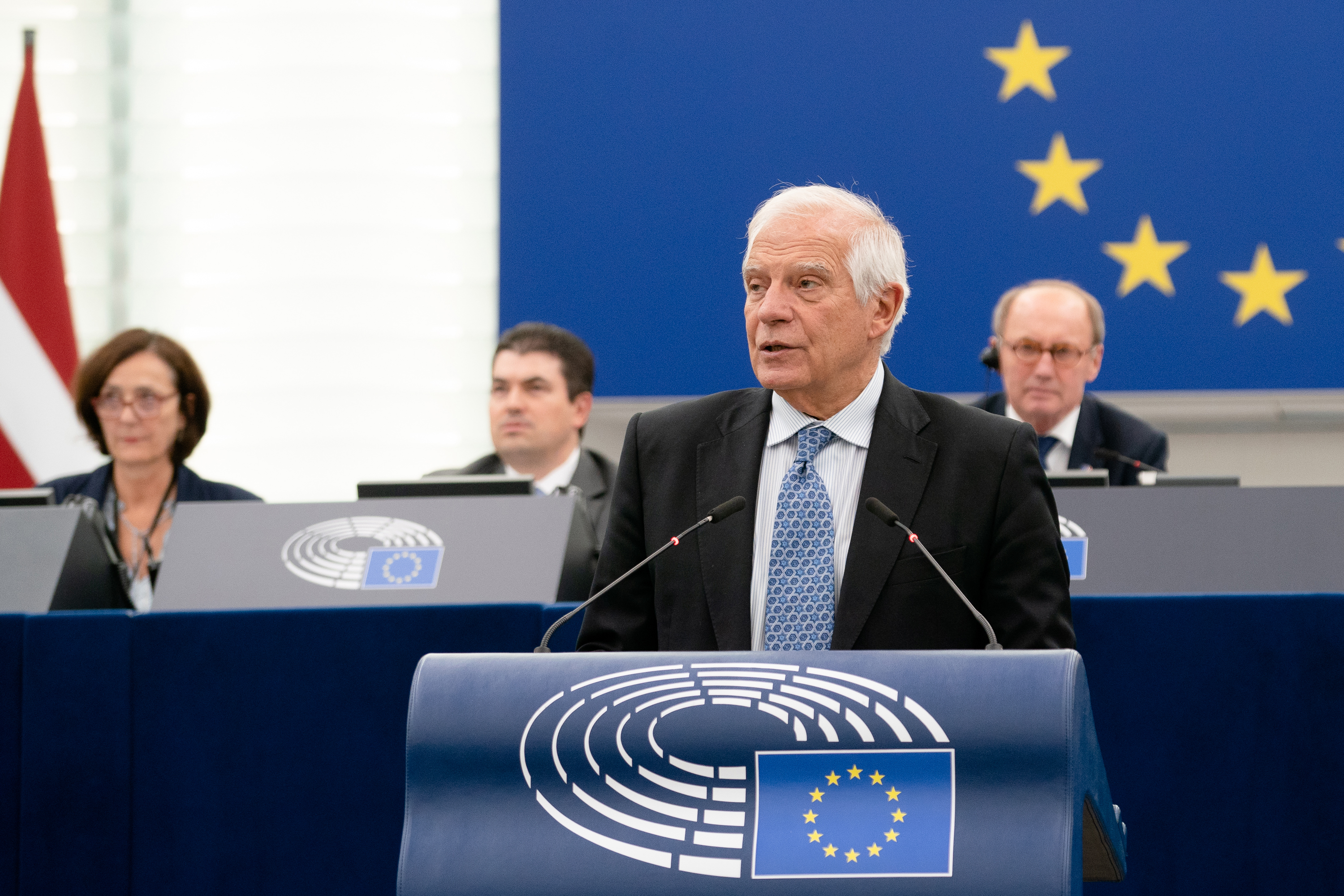
Borrell speaks to the European Parliament in 2022.

On 22 February 2022, after Russia recognised the breakaway Donetsk People's Republic and Lugansk People's Republic and subsequently sent troops into the two regions, Borrell issued a statement condemning the actions and called upon Russia to return to the tenets of the Normandy Format. Following the Russian invasion of Ukraine on 24 February, Borrell and European Commission president Ursula von der Leyen were part of an EU delegation visiting Kyiv on 8 April. Borrell said he wants EU countries to confiscate frozen foreign-exchange reserves of the Russian central bank—which amount to over $300 billion—to cover the costs of rebuilding Ukraine after the war.

In September 2022, he welcomed a UN report on the human rights abuses of the Uyghur minority in China.

On 13 October 2022, when speaking at the European Diplomatic Academy's inauguration ceremony in Bruges, Belgium, Borrell declared that "Europe is a garden and the rest of the world is a jungle." He added that the garden could be invaded by the jungle and that the gardeners would need to travel there in order to defend it. On 18 October, in response to his comments, the Ministry of Foreign Affairs of the United Arab Emirates summoned the acting head of the EU mission at UAE to explain Borrell's remarks, stating that the remarks were "inappropriate and discriminatory" and "contribute to a worsening climate of intolerance and discrimination worldwide."

==== 2023 ====
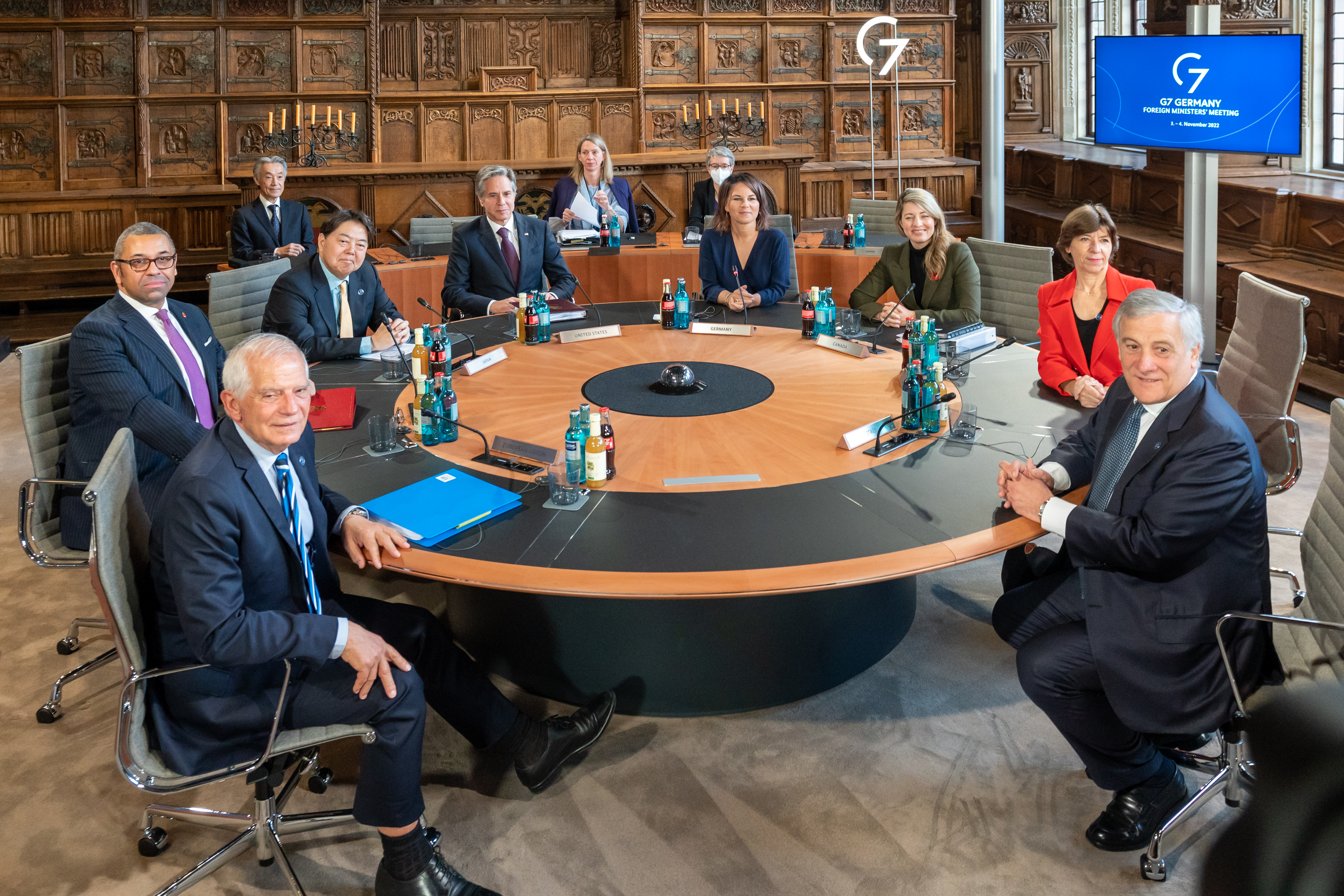
The second official G7 Foreign Ministers Meeting in Muenster, Germany

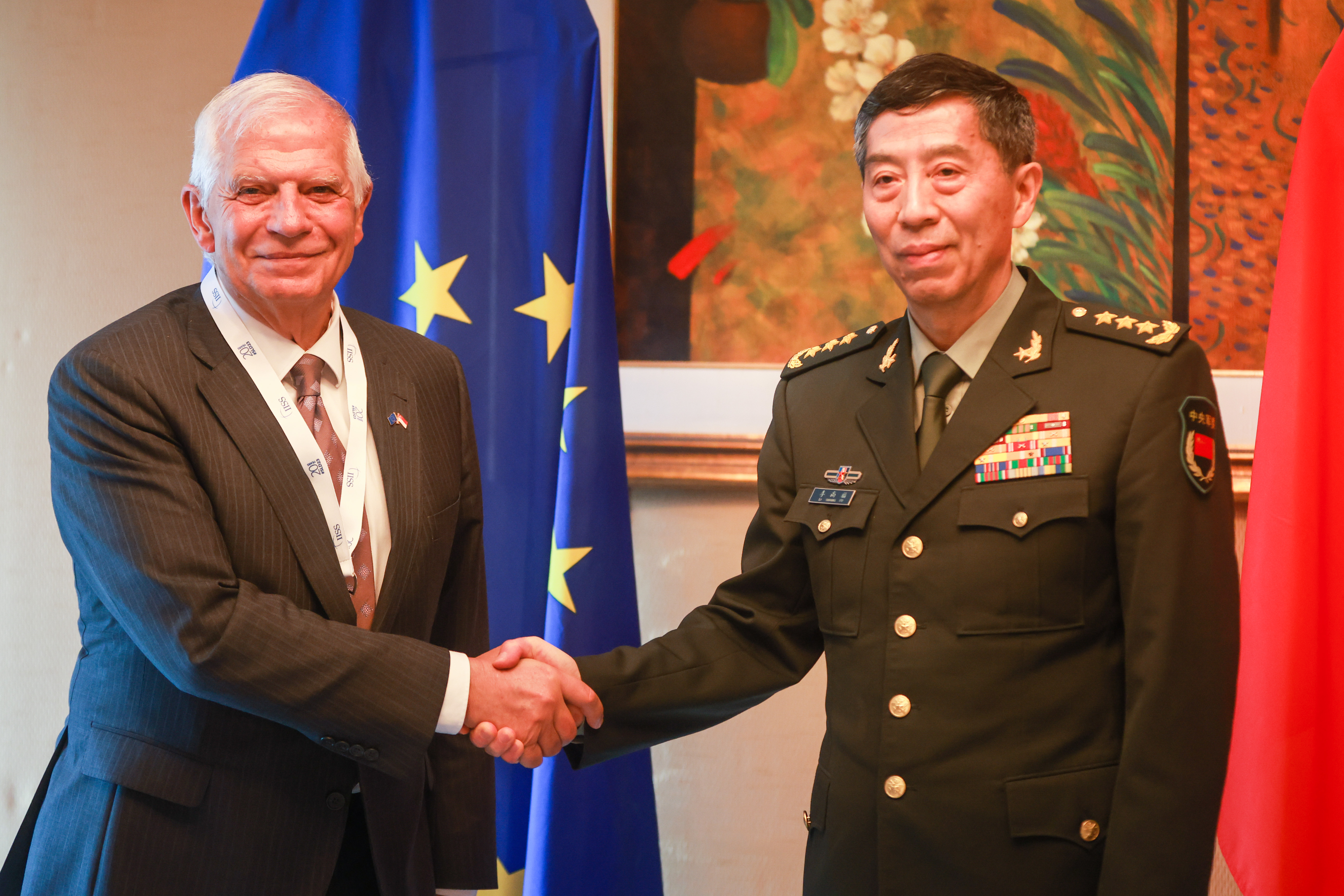
Borrell with Chinese Defence Minister Li Shangfu on 4 June 2023

In March 2023, after the Ethiopia–Tigray peace agreement was signed and after talks with US Secretary of State Antony Blinken, Borrell said that the European Union and the United States would normalize relations with Ethiopia "in a gradual way, step-by-step".

In April 2023, he criticised China for its support of Russia, saying that "We have been clear with China that its position on Russia's atrocities and war crimes will determine the quality of our relations with Beijing."

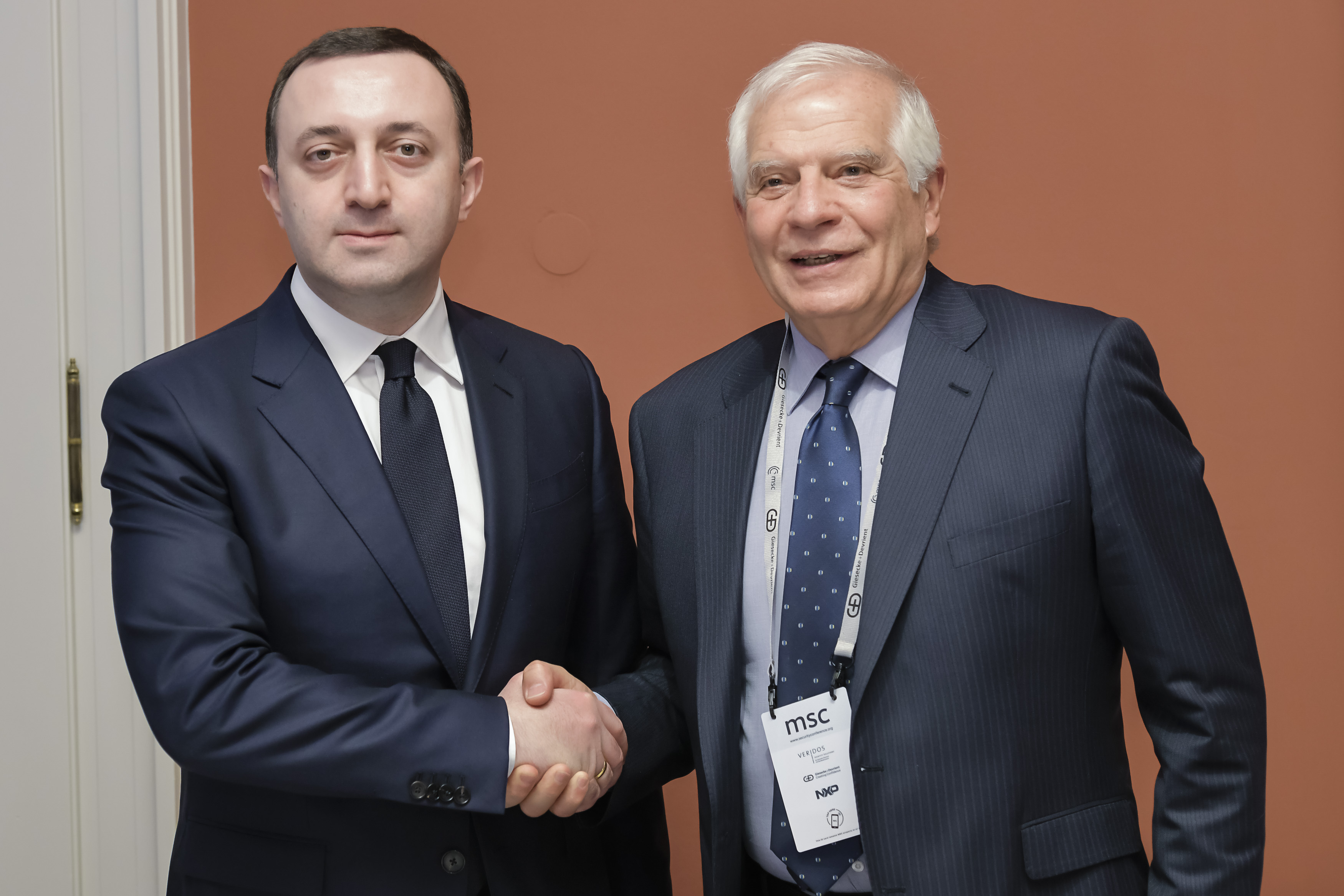
Borrell with Georgian Prime Minister Irakli Garibashvili on 17 February 2023

On 3 June 2023, Indonesian Defense Minister Prabowo Subianto proposed a multi-point peace plan for the Russian invasion of Ukraine, calling for a ceasefire, a demilitarized zone observed and monitored by UN peacekeepers, and a U.N. referendum in what he called "disputed territory". Borrell criticized Prabow's proposal, saying that "We need to bring peace to Ukraine", but it must be a "just peace, not a peace of surrender."

On 21 September 2023, Borrell released a statement which condemned the military operation by Azerbaijan against the Armenian population of Nagorno-Karabakh and deplored the casualties and loss of life caused by the offensive.

He condemned the "barbaric and terrorist attack" by Hamas on Israel, which started the Gaza war. On 10 October 2023, Borrell accused Israel of breaking international law by imposing a blockade of the Gaza Strip. On 3 January 2024, he condemned the comments of the Israeli ministers Itamar Ben-Gvir and Bezalel Smotrich, writing, "Forced displacements are strictly prohibited as a grave violation of [international humanitarian law] & words matter." In March 2024, Borrell said Israel's depriving food from Palestinians was a serious violation of international humanitarian law, and described the Flour massacre as "totally unacceptable carnage". German Chancellor Olaf Scholz confronted Borrell over his months-long criticism of Israel, saying Borrell did not speak for Germany.

==== 2024 ====
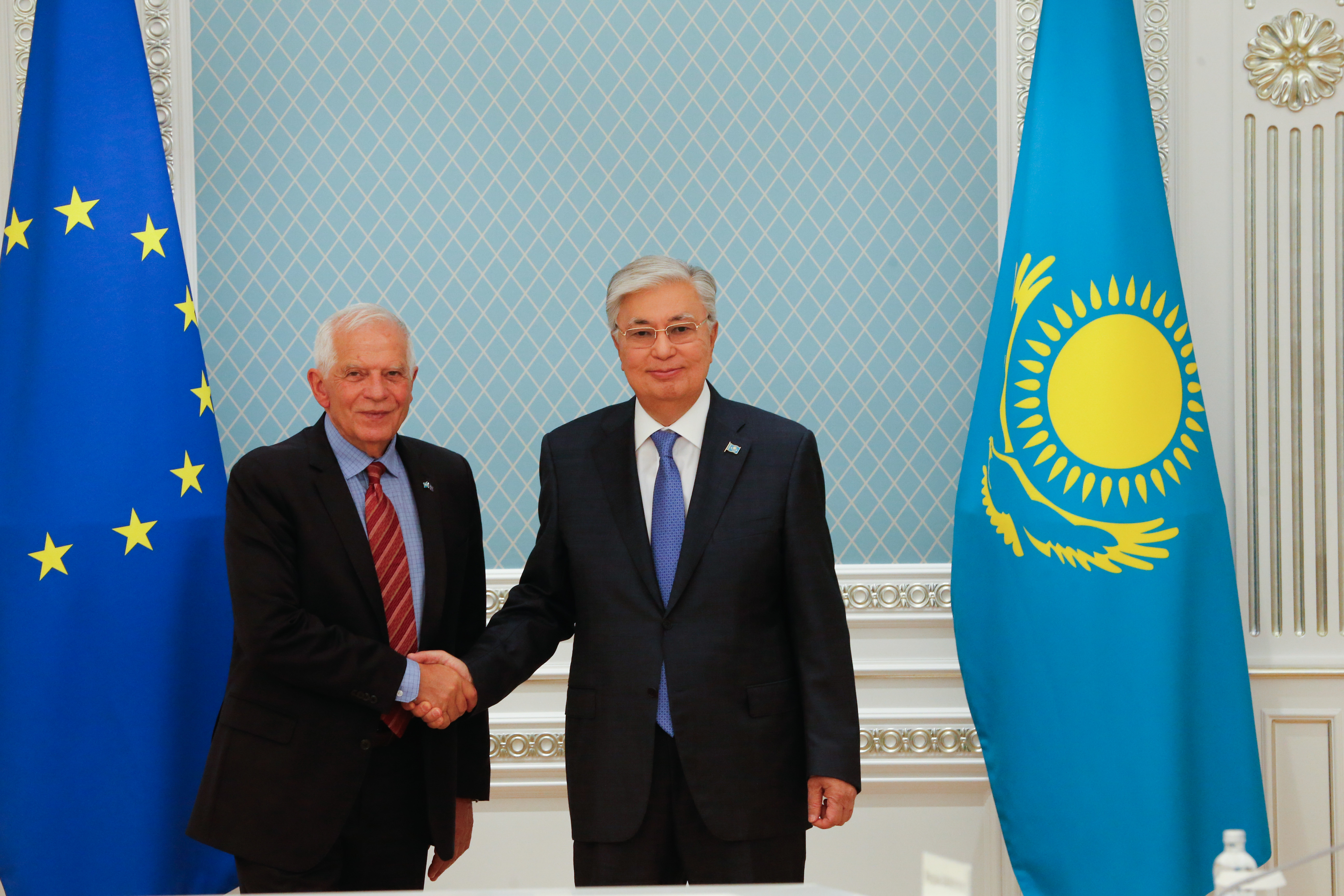
Borrell with President of Kazakhstan Kassym-Jomart Tokayev in Astana, 1 August 2024

In April 2024, Borrell "strongly condemned" the Iranian strikes on Israel, calling them "an unprecedented escalation and a grave threat to regional security". Previously in March 2024, Borrell had stalled efforts by nine EU foreign ministers to sanction Iran over its missile and drone program, because he felt that new sanctions might hamper efforts to bind Iran to a nuclear non-proliferation deal.

On 15 May 2024, Borrell called on Israel to immediately halt its assault on Rafah, stating it was disrupting humanitarian aid and causing a humanitarian crisis, while also calling on Hamas to release all Israeli hostages. Borrell condemned the Tel al-Sultan attack, saying that Israel's military actions needed to stop.

== Post Brussels, 2025–present ==
In May 2025, after his retirement as an EU diplomat, Borrell spoke out against Israel's actions, accusing Israel of committing genocide in Gaza. After the 2026 United States strikes in Venezuela, Borrell advocated for greater strategic independence for Europe from the United States and described Trump's actions as a clear violation of international law.

== Other positions ==
Corporate boards

- PRISA, member of the Advisory Board (since 2025)
- Abengoa, member of the board of directors (2009–2016)

Non-profit organizations

- Mo Ibrahim Foundation, member of the Council (since 2025)
- European Institute of the Mediterranean (IEMed), member of the board
- European Movement International, member of the board of trustees
- Fundación Focus, member of the board of trustees
- Graduate School for Global and International Studies, University of Salamanca, member of the advisory board
- Reporters Without Borders (RWB), member of the emeritus board

== Honours ==
=== National honours ===
- 1996 : Grand Cross of the Order of Charles III
- 2000 : Grand Cross of the Order of Isabella the Catholic
- 2007 : Grand Cross of the Order of the Civil Merit
- 2011 : Medal of the Order of Constitutional Merit
- Doctor honoris causa by Universidad de Valladolid (Spain, 2024).
- 2024 : Grand Cross of Aeronautical Merit, with White Decoration
- Doctor honoris causa by Universidad Pontificia Comillas (Spain, 2025).

=== Foreign honours ===
- 2006 : Grand Cross of the Grand Order of Queen Jelena (Croatia)
- 2015 : Commander of the Légion d'Honneur (France)
- 2022 : Third Class of the Order of Merit (Ukraine)
- 2025 : Grand Cordon of the Order of the Rising Sun (Japan)

== Personal life ==
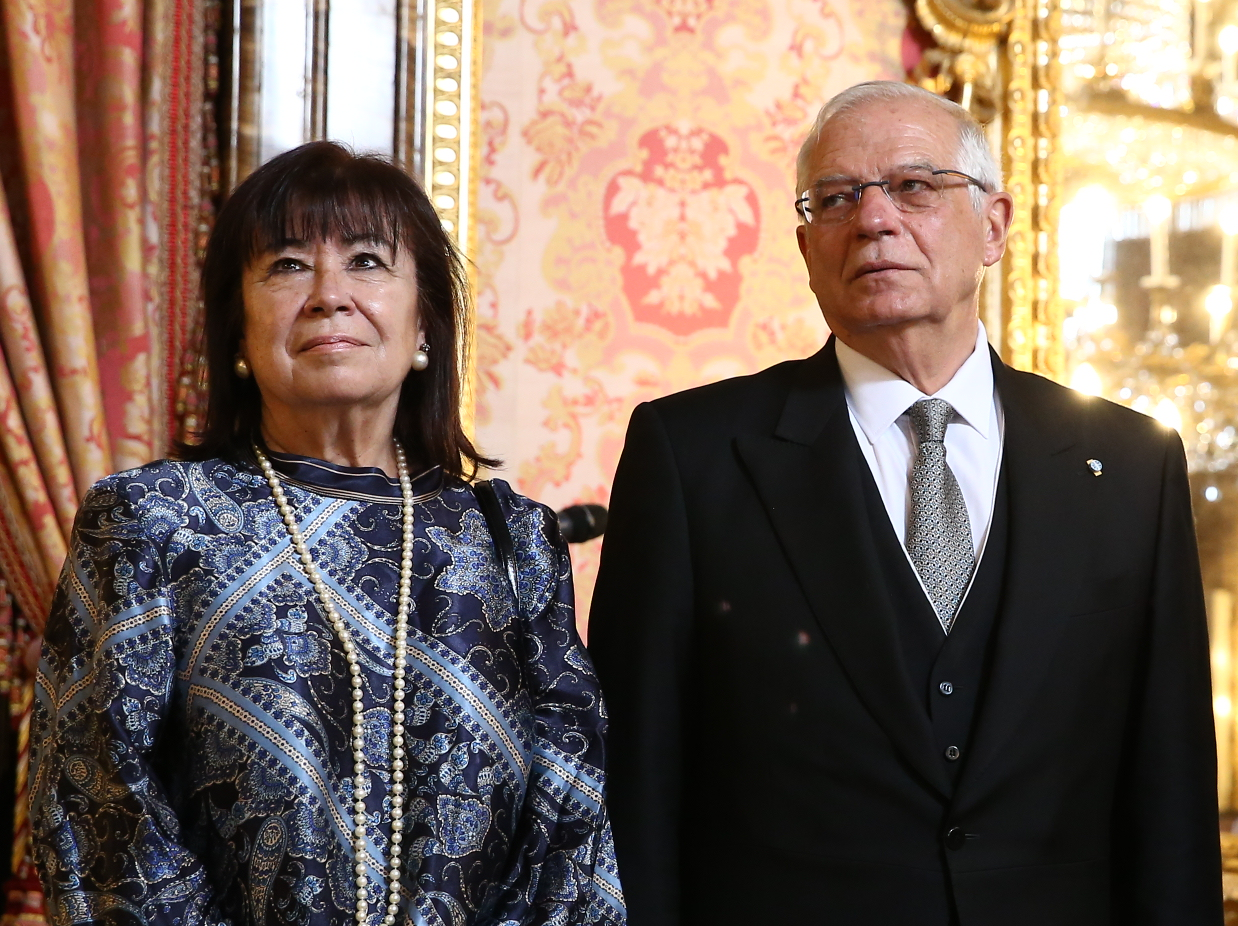
Josep Borrell and Cristina Narbona during a reception of the Diplomatic Corps in 2019

Borrell was first married to French sociologist Carolina Mayeur. The marriage produced two sons: Joan, a diplomat, and Lionel, an aircraft pilot. Borrell and Mayeur divorced in the 1990s.

Since 1998, Borrell has been in a relationship with Cristina Narbona, a Spanish PSOE politician and former Minister of Environment (2004–2008) in the Zapatero administration. The couple, resident in Valdemorillo since 2001, married in July 2018.

In 2019, he acquired Argentine citizenship through descent, stating that he wished to honour the memory of his father, who grew up in Mendoza, Argentina.

Borrell speaks Spanish, Catalan, Italian, French and English.

He has been a keen participant in the annual festivity in his native Pobla de Segur descending the Noguera Pallaresa river, in which the stream is rowed down by the partakers as log drivers (raiers).

=== Corrupt share dealing ===
In November 2018, the national stock market regulator in Spain concluded that Borrell traded shares of the company Abengoa while in possession of insider information. Borrell was fined €30,000 for the breach.

== Electoral history ==
Electoral history of Josep Borrell
Election	List	Constituency	List position	Result
Majadahonda municipal election, 1979	PSOE	–	5th (out of 17)	Elected
Spanish general election, 1986	PSC–PSOE	Barcelona	8th (out of 33)	Elected
Spanish general election, 1989	PSC–PSOE	Barcelona	5th (out of 32)	Elected
Spanish general election, 1993	PSC–PSOE	Barcelona	2nd (out of 32)	Elected
Spanish general election, 1996	PSC–PSOE	Barcelona	2nd (out of 31)	Elected
Spanish general election, 2000	PSC–PSOE	Barcelona	2nd (out of 31)	Elected
European Parliament election, 2004	PSOE	Spain	1st (out of 54)	Elected
European Parliament election, 2019	PSOE	Spain	1st (out of 51)	Elected

== Publications ==
Authored books

- Borrell Fontelles, José (1981). Métodos matemáticos para la economía: campos y autosistemas. Madrid: Pirámide.
- Borrell Fontelles, José (1992). La república de Taxonia: ejercicios de matemáticas aplicadas a la economía. Madrid: Pirámide.
- Borrell, José (1998). Al filo de los días. Madrid: Cauce.
- Borrell Fontelles, José (2015) [1976]. Aplicaciones de la teoría del control óptimo a la planificación económica. Universidad Complutense de Madrid, Facultad de Ciencias Económicas y Empresariales. (Note: 2015 open-access version of his unpublished PhD thesis, read in 1976.)
- Borrell, Josep (2017). Los idus de octubre. Reflexiones sobre la crisis de la socialdemocracia y el futuro del PSOE. Madrid: Editorial Catarata.

Co-authored books

- Abadía, Antonio; Fanjul, Óscar; Borrell Fontelles, Josep (1981). El modelo dinámico multisectorial de crecimiento económico, empleo y redistribución de la renta. Madrid: Fundación del Instituto Nacional de Industria.
- Borrell, Josep; Missé, Andreu (2012). La crisis del euro: de Atenas a Madrid. Madrid: Turpial.
- Borrell, Josep; Llorach, Joan (2015). Las cuentas y los cuentos de la independencia. Madrid: Editorial Catarata.

== Notes ==
Political offices
Preceded by José Víctor Sevilla Segura	Secretary of State of Finance; 1984–1991	Succeeded by Antonio Zabalza
Preceded by Javier Sáenz de Cosculluela	Minister of Public Works and Environment; 1991–1996	Succeeded by Rafael Arias-Salgado
Preceded by Pedro Solbes	President of the Joint Congress-Senate Committee on the European Union; 1999–2000; 2000–2004	Succeeded by Ana Palacio
Preceded by Pat Cox	President of the European Parliament; 2004–2007	Succeeded by Hans-Gert Pöttering
Preceded by Luisa Morgantini	Chairperson of the European Parliament Committee on Development; 2007–2009	Succeeded by Eva Joly
Preceded by Alfonso Dastis	Minister of Foreign Affairs, the European Union and Cooperation; 2018–2019	Succeeded by Margarita Robles (acting)
Preceded by Federica Mogherini	Vice-President of the European Commission; 2019–2024	Succeeded by Kaja Kallas
Preceded by Federica Mogherini	High Representative of the European Union for Foreign Affairs and Security Policy; 2019–2024	Succeeded by Kaja Kallas
Honorary titles
Preceded by Joaquín Almunia	Leader of the Opposition; 1998–1999	Succeeded by Joaquín Almunia
Preceded by Miguel Arias Cañete	Spanish European Commissioner; 2019–present	Incumbent
Party political offices
Preceded by Juan Manuel Eguiagaray	Leader of the Socialist Group in the Congress of Deputies; 1998–1999	Succeeded by Luis Martínez Noval
