= Katja Glieson =

Australian-German singer (born 1996)

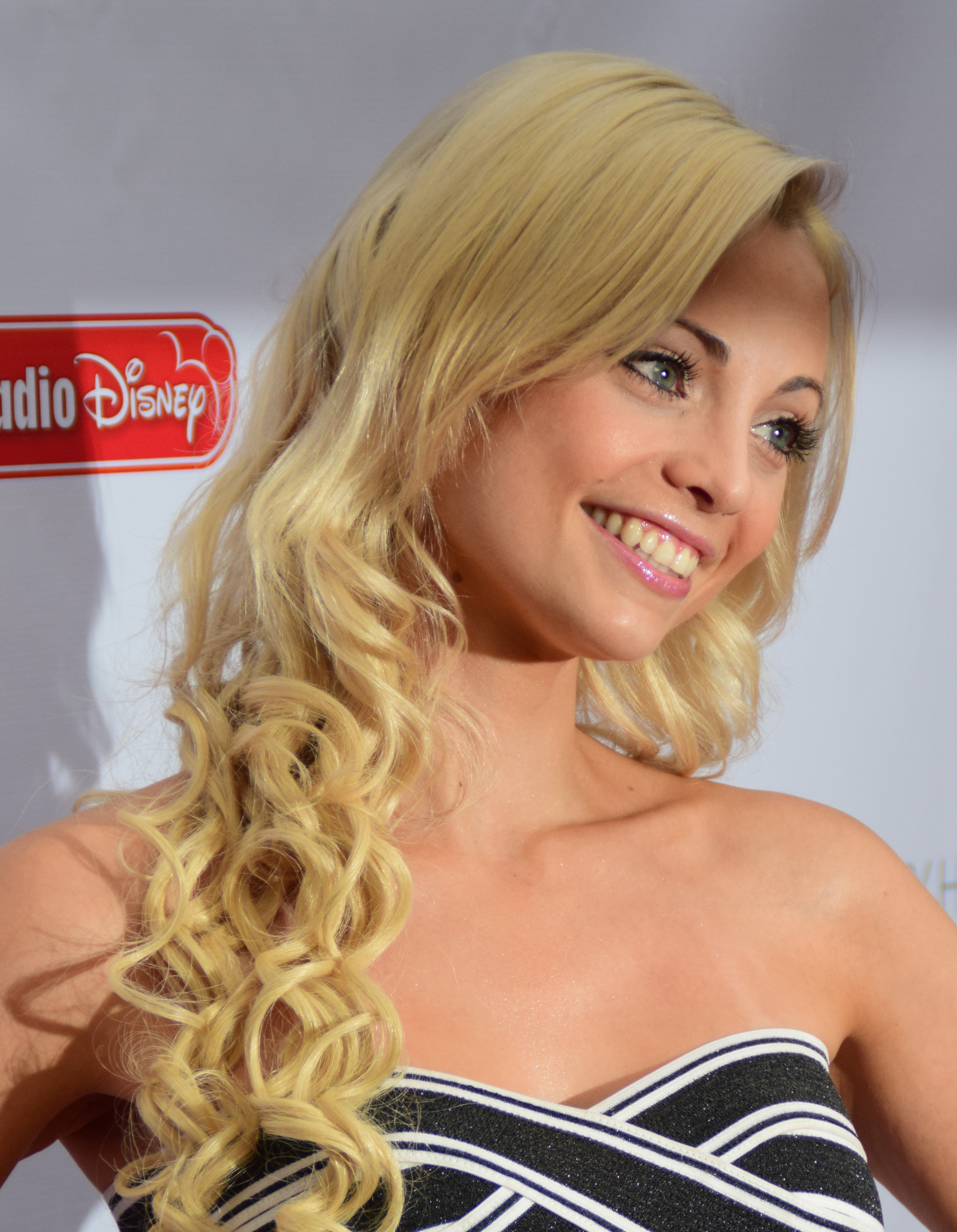
- Glieson in 2015

Background information
- Born: Katja Angelique Glieson; 19 August 1996 (age 29); Melbourne, Australia
- Origin: Australia, Germany
- Genres: Pop, hip-hop, R&B, dance-pop
- Occupations: Singer, influencer
- Years active: 2013–present
- Website: katjaglieson.com

Katja-Angelique Glieson (born 19 August 1996), better known as Katja Glieson, is an Australian-German singer from Melbourne. She first gained recognition in 2014 for playing 'Elsa' in the YouTube video Princess Rap Battle, where she raps with Snow White, which has been featured on Perez Hilton, Cosmopolitan, The Huffington Post, MTV, and Pop Crunch. Glieson released a music video called 'Come Thru' which has garnered over seven million views on YouTube.

== Early life ==
Katja Glieson was born Katja-Angelique Glieson in Melbourne, Australia, to German immigrants. She made a "difficult decision to move away from family and friends to pursue a career in music; she worked three jobs and saved money to make the move to Los Angeles in order to live out her dreams". Glieson talked about struggling with shyness and bullying while growing up, made worse by being an overweight little girl. She suffered more than her fair share of ridicule and bullying in elementary school and finally she turned to music. Singing gave her a positive outlet. "I used to sing to myself to kind of feel better and fill the void of having friends. It made me feel better," Glieson said.

== Career ==
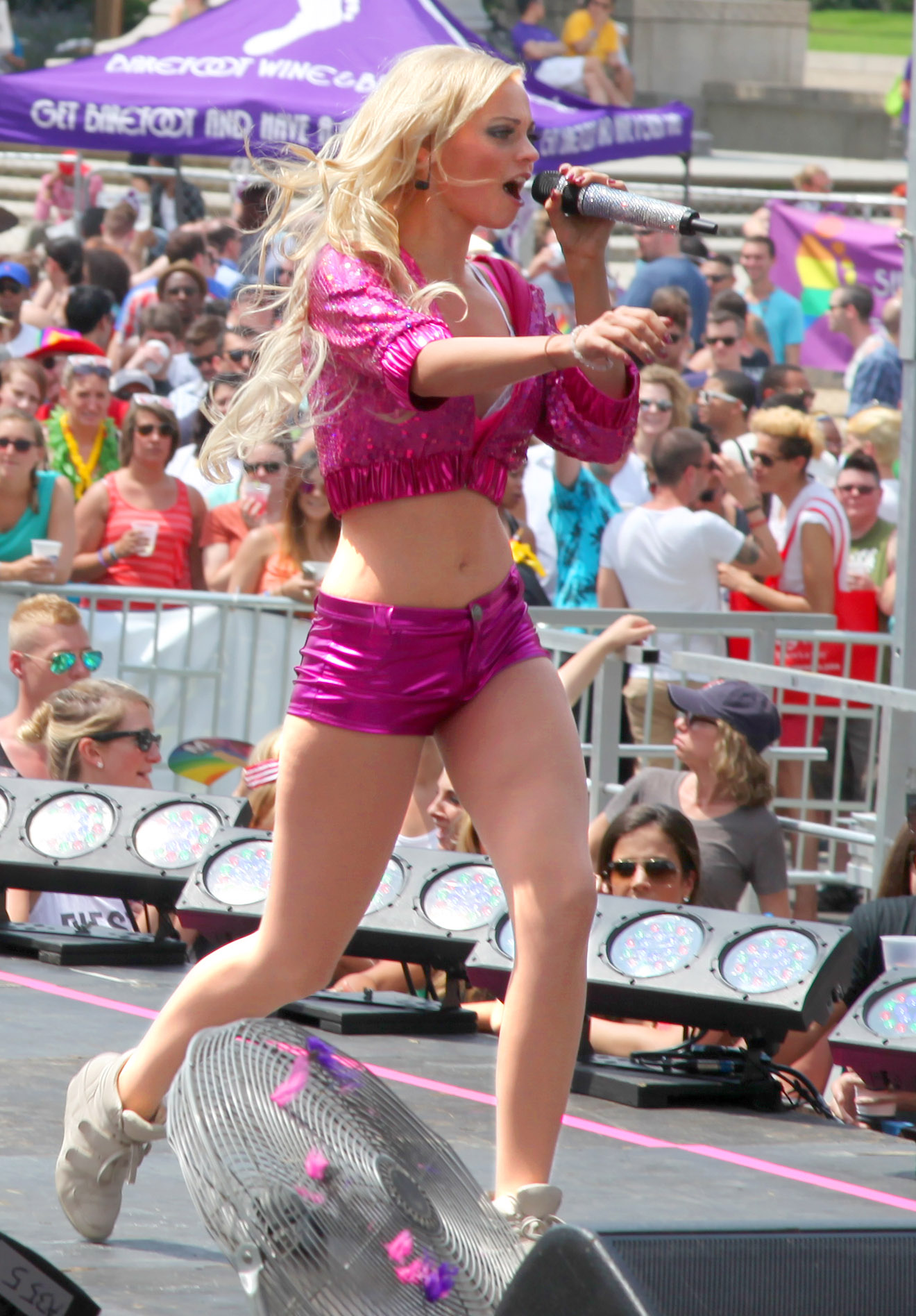
Glieson Performing Live at Capital Pride in 2014

Glieson performed on the mainstages at LA PRIDE, OC PRIDE and CAPITAL PRIDE in 2014. After appearing in the Princess Rap Battle, Glieson also released her original song "Look At Us" on YouTube, featuring Ongina from RuPaul's Drag Race and YouTuber Zedakiah. Lyrically, "Look At Us" embodies female empowerment and celebrates the idea of staying true to who you are. Glieson also uploads covers to YouTube, such as "Black Widow".

Glieson has released nine songs: "I Would Kill", "Ride the Wave", "Me Then U", "Picky", "Look At Us", "Temporary" featuring Michael Mancuso, "The Ones Like Me", "Come Thru", "California Dream", "Better View" and her last single "Starseed".

== Awards and nominations ==
- 2014 Beat100 #1 Charting Video & Gold Award for "Problem" Cover Video (won)
- 2014 Beat100 No. 2 Charting Video & Gold Song A&R Award, Gold Video A&R Award & Gold Favorite A&R Award for "Hot Mess" Original Video & Song (won)
- 2014 Beat100 Top Artist of 2014
- 2014 World Music & Independent Film Festival "Metropolis" Most Creative Music Video (nominated)
- 2014 NewFilmmakers NY "Metropolis" (nominated)
- 2022 Los Angeles Film Awards, Best Song for "Starseed".
