= Musik Josef =

Japanese manufacturer of woodwind instruments

- Founded: July 4, 2007
- Headquarters: Japan
- Products: Musical instruments
- Website: www.josef-oboe.com/en/about.html

Musik Josef is a Japanese manufacturer of musical instruments. It was founded by Yukio Nakamura and is the only company in Japan specializing in producing oboes and cors anglais.

== Products ==
=== Oboe ===
- AS
- BS
- MGS
- CGS
- PGS

=== Cor anglais ===
- ES1
