= Waldemar Josef =

German footballer

Personal information
- Full name: Waldemar Josef
- Date of birth: 25 October 1960 (age 66)
- Place of birth: Wolfsburg, West Germany
- Height: 1.87 m (6 ft 1 1/2 in)
- Position: Goalkeeper

Youth career
- 1970–1979: VfL Wolfsburg

Senior career*
| Years | Team | Apps | (Gls) |
| 1979–1982 | VfL Wolfsburg | | |
| 1982–1986 | Eintracht Braunschweig | 40 | (0) |
| 1986–1988 | VfL Wolfsburg | | |
- * Club domestic league appearances and goals as of 14 May 2012

Waldemar Josef (born 25 October 1960) is a retired German footballer. He spent three seasons with Eintracht Braunschweig in the Bundesliga, as well as one season in the 2. Bundesliga.
