= 1996 Spanish general election =

- 3 March 1996

All 350 seats in the Congress of Deputies and 208 (of 257) seats in the Senate 176 seats needed for a majority in the Congress of Deputies
- Opinion polls
- Registered: 32,531,833 ▲4.8%
- Turnout: 25,172,058 (77.4%) ▲1.0 pp
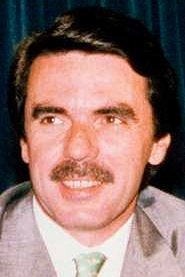

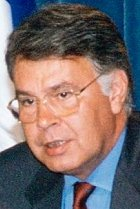

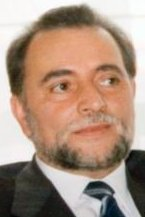

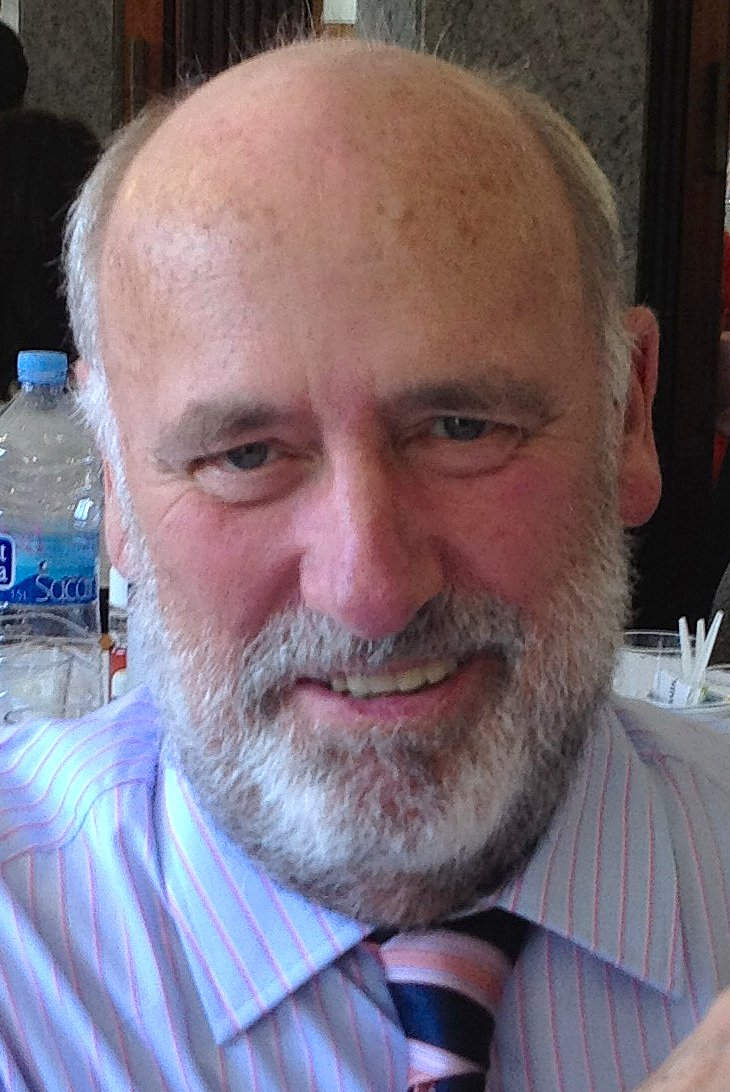

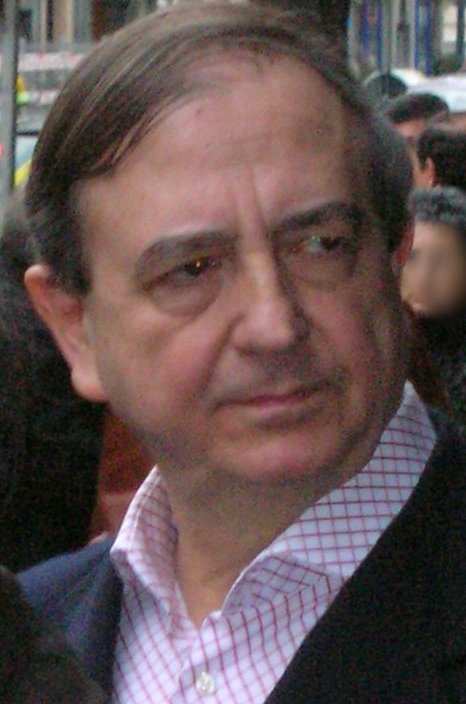

	First party	Second party	Third party
Leader	José María Aznar	Felipe González	Julio Anguita
Party	PP	PSOE	IU
Leader since	2 September 1989	28 September 1979	12 February 1989
Leader's seat	Madrid	Madrid	Madrid
Last election	142 seats, 35.4% (Note: Results for PP (34.8%, 141 deputies) and PAR (0.6%, 1 deputy) in the 1993 Congress election.)	159 seats, 38.8%	18 seats, 9.6%
Seats won	156	141	21
Seat change	▲14	▼18	▲3
Popular vote	9,716,006	9,425,678	2,639,774
Percentage	38.8%	37.6%	10.5%
Swing	▲3.4 pp	▼1.2 pp	▲0.9 pp
	Fourth party	Fifth party	Sixth party
Leader	Joaquim Molins	Iñaki Anasagasti	José Carlos Mauricio
Party	CiU	EAJ/PNV	CC
Leader since	31 January 1995	1986	1996
Leader's seat	Barcelona	Biscay	Las Palmas
Last election	17 seats, 4.9%	5 seats, 1.2%	4 seats, 0.9%
Seats won	16	5	4
Seat change	▼1	0	0
Popular vote	1,151,633	318,951	220,418
Percentage	4.6%	1.3%	0.9%
Swing	▼0.3 pp	▲0.1 pp	0.0 pp
Prime Minister before election
Felipe González
PSOE
Prime Minister after election
José María Aznar
PP

A general election was held in Spain on 3 March 1996 to elect the members of the 6th Cortes Generales under the Spanish Constitution of 1978. All 350 seats in the Congress of Deputies were up for election, as well as 208 of 257 seats in the Senate. It was held concurrently with a regional election in Andalusia and fifteen months ahead of schedule, after a legislative term of just two-and-a-half years.

Ever since forming a minority government after its victory in the 1993 election, the Spanish Socialist Workers' Party (PSOE) had to deal with the impact of the early 1990s recession in the Spanish economy, amid soaring unemployment, an increase in public deficit and GDP contraction. Internal divisions flourished at the 1994 PSOE congress between supporters of Prime Minister Felipe González and those of deputy leader Alfonso Guerra. González's cabinet was also rocked by the unveiling of a string of scandals, including accusations of misusing the "reserved funds" (the government's black budget for special operations) to pay for undeclared bonuses to high-ranking officials (the Roldán affair) and fund a "dirty war" against the ETA group through the GAL death squads; ongoing investigations into the Filesa and Ibercorp affairs; alleged tax evasion by former and current cabinet members; and illegal espionage by the CESID, the Spanish intelligence agency. Amid mounting political pressure, a snap election was triggered after Convergence and Union (CiU) withdrew its confidence and supply support from the government in mid 1995 and helped vote down the 1996 General State Budget in October that year.

The election resulted in the first PSOE defeat in a general election since 1979, but opinion poll predictions of a landslide victory by the opposition José María Aznar's People's Party (PP)—which had achieved resounding wins in the 1994 European Parliament election and the 1995 local and regional elections—failed to materialize. The PP, which aimed to secure enough support to govern alone (Aznar's coined "sufficient majority"), saw the election turn into the closest result between the two major parties in the Spanish democratic period to date; a PSOE comeback, fueled by a strong 77.4% voter turnout (the highest scored ever since) left the PP leading by just 1.2 percentage points and 290,000 votes, falling 20 seats short of an outright overall majority. Julio Anguita's United Left—which had hoped to come close or even surpass the PSOE, in the so-called sorpasso—also failed to meet expectations, despite scoring over 10% in their best overall result in a general election since the Communist Party of Spain's one in 1979.

At 156 seats, this would be the worst performance for a winning party in the democratic period until the 2015 election. The results forced Aznar to seek support for his investiture from peripheral nationalists, which he had ferociously attacked in the previous years over their alliance with González's government. After two months of negotiations, agreements were reached with CiU, the Basque Nationalist Party and Canarian Coalition (in what would become known as the Majestic Pacts), enabling Aznar to become prime minister at the helm of a centre-right minority cabinet, and signalling the end of over 13 years of Socialist government in Spain.

== Background ==
Following the victory of the ruling Spanish Socialist Workers' Party (PSOE) at the 1993 general election, Felipe González was able to be re-elected as prime minister of Spain for a fourth term in office through a confidence and supply alliance with the Catalan nationalist Convergence and Union (CiU) and the support of the Basque Nationalist Party, both of which rejected the possibility of joining a coalition cabinet despite earlier speculation. The animosity between González's PSOE and Julio Anguita's United Left (IU) made any agreement between the two parties unfeasible, despite their combined parliamentary majority.

The 1992–1993 economic crisis continued, with González's fourth government having to face the impact of unemployment growth, a large public deficit and recession. The cabinet enforced a labour reform legalizing temporary work agencies, introducing "junk contracts", easening employers' ability to modify working conditions, reducing overtime and severance pays and making regulations on hiring and collective bargaining more flexible; this was met with a general strike in January 1994. Economic recovery started that year with a slow decrease of unemployment rates and a GDP growth of 2%, but the deficit in the social security system led to the Toledo Pact: a multi-party agreement to transfer all health care system and social assistance benefit financial obligations to the General State Budget (being henceforth funded through general taxes), while social security contributions were maintained to fund pensions. Another agreement also saw the approval of the first fully-democratic Criminal Code.

The Basque ETA group maintained its activity, which saw the 1993 Madrid bombings, the January 1995 killing of Gregorio Ordóñez (a PP local councillor in San Sebastián), attempted assassination plots on the opposition leader, José María Aznar (in April 1995), and on King Juan Carlos I (in the summer of 1995), the 1995 Vallecas bombing, and the kidnapping of prison officer José Antonio Ortega Lara in January 1996. The internal conflict within the PSOE between González's "renovators" (Spanish: renovadores) and Alfonso Guerra's supporters (guerristas) led to the former's victory at the 1994 party congress, while disagreements with González led to the resignation from the government of judge Baltasar Garzón, a star candidate in the 1993 election. Internationally, Spain held the presidency of the Council of the European Union in 1995 and was part of the NATO intervention in the Bosnian War (particularly the May 1995 Pale air strikes), which helped the selection of the Spanish foreign minister, Javier Solana, as new NATO secretary general in December 1995.

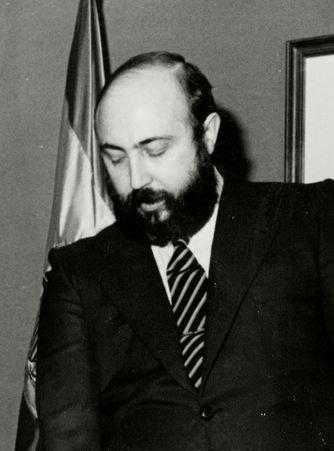
Luis Roldán served as director general of the Civil Guard from 1986 to 1993.

This period saw the uncovering of numerous corruption scandals affecting the ruling PSOE. The Roldán affair kicked off in November 1993 with reports of a large increase in Luis Roldán's wealth during his time as Civil Guard's director; this was later traced to illicit bonus payments from the Interior ministry's "reserved funds" (the government's black budget intended to finance operations against terrorism and drug trafficking) and the collection of kickbacks from the awarding of public contracts by Gabriel Urralburu while serving as Navarrese president. In April 1994, Roldán fled the country to escape prosecution—causing the resignation of the interior minister, Antoni Asunción—and later admitted to the wrongdoing. He was captured on 27 February 1995 in Laos amid unconfirmed claims of a deal with the government. Concurrently, Mariano Rubio was revealed to own undeclared bank accounts in the Ibercorp investment bank and to have used insider trading as Bank of Spain governor to amass his wealth; this prompted the resignations as PSOE's parliamentary spokesperson of Carlos Solchaga (former economy minister and a Rubio supporter in the early stages of the Ibercorp affair) and of Vicente Albero as agriculture minister (after it transpired that he owned an undeclared bank account related to the scandal).

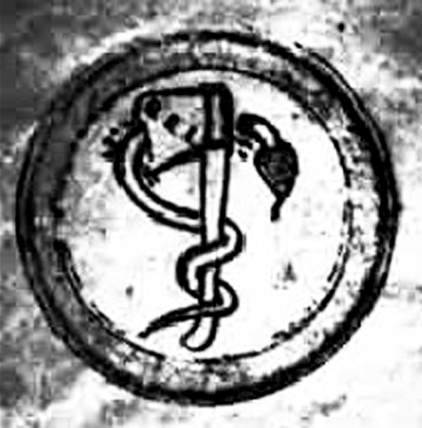
Symbol used by the GAL death squads

In December 1994, two policemen convicted in 1991 for the Marey affair—the use of death squads, the Liberation Antiterrorist Groups (GAL), in a "dirty war" against ETA—admitted the involvement of a number of former National Police and Interior ministry officers (including former minister José Barrionuevo and security directors Julián Sancristóbal and Rafael Vera) and the financing of the GAL through the reserved funds, leading the Spanish National Court to re-open investigations on the affair in February 1995. Some defendants accused Felipe González of "knowing and allowing [the GAL's] activities", even hinting at his responsibility in establishing and financing the squads (the "Mr. X" person attributed leadership over the GAL network). The new investigations also involved the GAL in the killing of Lasa and Zabala one decade earlier. Barrionuevo, Vera and Sancristóbal would be convicted for the scandal, but the Spanish Supreme Court concluded in 1996 that there was no proof of González's involvement.

Other scandals would see Banesto chairman Mario Conde prosecuted for various crimes: fraud and misappropriation over the Banesto affair in late 1993 (the entity's failure and subsequent intervention by the government) and forgery over the Argentia Trust affair in 1994; the BOE affair (alleged embezzlement of public funds through the purchase of overpriced newsprint for the Official State Gazette, BOE); the Salanueva affair (involving former BOE director Carmen Salanueva fraudulently purchasing paintings at low prices invoking the names of Queen Sofía and González's spouse, Carmen Romero); and the ongoing judicial probe on the Filesa affair (the alleged illegal funding of PSOE campaigns). In June 1995, it was revealed that the Superior Centre of Defense Information (CESID)—the main Spanish intelligence agency at the time—had been recording and keeping the taped telephone conversations of dozens of prominent public figures for years, including politicians, businessmen, journalists and the King himself, apparently without the cabinet's knowledge. This illegal espionage scandal led to the resignations of the defence minister, Julián García Vargas (under whose authority the CESID was responsible to), and deputy prime minister Narcís Serra (Vargas's predecessor in the office).

The mounting scandals and the impact of the economic crisis prompted a harsh opposition campaign by the People's Party (PP)—which had its greatest expression in Aznar's coined phrase of "Go away, Mr. González" (Spanish: Váyase, señor González) in every parliamentary intervention—but also by the left-wing IU, which frequently coincided with the PP in opposition to weaken the PSOE government (particularly following the 1994 Andalusian election). Throughout 1995, both parties considered supporting a no-confidence motion on González, but talks failed due to it requiring CiU's support to succeed. While González responded by accusing both parties of staging a "pincer movement" on the PSOE, his government's accumulated erosion took its toll: González's party suffered its first-ever nationwide defeat to the PP in the 1994 European Parliament election, and the 1995 local and regional elections brought about the loss of many Socialist governments throughout Spain and a decline in Catalonia for PSOE's parliamentary partner, CiU, which withdrew its confidence and supply support. This was materialized in the 1996 General State Budget being voted down by the Congress of Deputies on 25 October 1995, prompting González to call a snap election for March 1996, fifteen months ahead of schedule.

== Overview ==
Under the 1978 Constitution, the Spanish Cortes Generales were conceived as an imperfect bicameral system. The Congress of Deputies held greater legislative power than the Senate, having the ability to grant or withdraw confidence from a prime minister and to override Senate vetoes by an absolute majority. Nonetheless, the Senate retained a limited number of specific functions—such as ratifying international treaties, authorizing cooperation agreements between autonomous communities, enforcing direct rule, regulating interterritorial compensation funds, and taking part in constitutional amendments and in the appointment of members to the Constitutional Court and the General Council of the Judiciary—which were not subject to override by Congress.

=== Date ===
The term of each chamber of the Cortes Generales—the Congress and the Senate—expired four years from the date of their previous election, unless they were dissolved earlier. The election decree was required to be issued no later than 25 days before the scheduled expiration date of parliament and published on the following day in the Official State Gazette (BOE), with election day taking place 54 days after the decree's publication. The previous election was held on 6 June 1993, which meant that the chambers' terms would have expired on 6 June 1997. The election decree was required to be published in the BOE no later than 13 May 1997, setting the latest possible date for election day on 6 July 1997.

The prime minister had the prerogative to propose the monarch to dissolve both chambers at any given time—either jointly or separately—and call a snap election, provided that no motion of no confidence was in process, no state of emergency was in force and that dissolution did not occur before one year after a previous one. Additionally, both chambers were to be dissolved and a new election called if an investiture process failed to elect a prime minister within a two-month period from the first ballot. Barring this exception, there was no constitutional requirement for simultaneous elections to the Congress and the Senate. Still, as of 2026, there has been no precedent of separate elections taking place under the 1978 Constitution.

González initially rejected calls from opposition parties for a snap election amid the mounting scandals, instead intending to serve out the legislative term until 1997. Catalan president and González's ally, Jordi Pujol, sought to balance CiU's preference for the incoming Catalan election being held separately, and his belief that the government could not survive the political crisis. Following the PSOE's crash in the May 1995 local and regional elections, Pujol opted to have the Catalan election in the autumn and the general election in early 1996. While González resisted, he ultimately acceded to November and March as the regional and general election dates. Two months later, CiU U-turned and announced that it would seek an earlier general election by rejecting the 1996 General State Budget; González's refusal to alter the agreed timetable forced the Catalan election for November as initially planned. The government's budget was voted down in Congress on 25 October, CiU suffered a setback in the Catalan election, and the parliament's dissolution—with the election date for 3 March, concurrently with a snap election in Andalusia—was announced on 28 December, ending the legislative term after only two-and-a-half years.

The Cortes Generales were officially dissolved on 9 January 1996 with the publication of the corresponding decree in the BOE, setting election day for 3 March and scheduling for both chambers to reconvene on 27 March.

=== Electoral system ===
Voting for each chamber of the Cortes Generales was based on universal suffrage, comprising all Spanish nationals over 18 years of age with full political rights, provided that they had not been deprived of the right to vote by a final sentence, nor were legally incapacitated.

The Congress of Deputies had a minimum of 300 and a maximum of 400 seats, with electoral provisions fixing its size at 350. Of these, 348 were elected in 50 multi-member constituencies corresponding to the provinces of Spain—each of which was assigned an initial minimum of two seats and the remaining 248 distributed in proportion to population—using the D'Hondt method and closed-list proportional voting, with a three percent-threshold of valid votes (including blank ballots) in each constituency. The remaining two seats were allocated to Ceuta and Melilla as single-member districts elected by plurality voting. The use of this electoral method resulted in a higher effective threshold depending on district magnitude and vote distribution.

As a result of the aforementioned allocation, each Congress multi-member constituency was entitled the following seats:

Seats	Constituencies
34	Madrid
31	Barcelona^{(−1)}
16	Valencia
13	Seville^{(+1)}
11	Alicante^{(+1)}
10	Málaga
9	Asturias, Biscay, Cádiz, La Coruña, Murcia
8	Pontevedra
7	Balearics, Córdoba, Granada, Las Palmas, Santa Cruz de Tenerife, Zaragoza
6	Badajoz, Guipúzcoa, Jaén, Tarragona
5	Almería, Cáceres, Cantabria, Castellón, Ciudad Real, Girona, Huelva, León, Navarre, Toledo, Valladolid
4	Álava, Albacete, Burgos, La Rioja, Lleida, Lugo^{(−1)}, Orense, Salamanca
3	Ávila, Cuenca, Guadalajara, Huesca, Palencia, Segovia, Soria, Teruel, Zamora

208 Senate seats were elected using open-list (Note: Parties could group candidates into lists, although each candidate was treated separately for the purpose of the voting procedure.) partial block voting: voters in constituencies electing four seats could choose up to three candidates; in those with two or three seats, up to two; and in single-member districts, one. Each of the 47 peninsular provinces was allocated four seats, while in insular provinces—such as the Balearic and Canary Islands—the districts were the islands themselves, with the larger ones (Mallorca, Gran Canaria and Tenerife) being allocated three seats each, and the smaller ones (Menorca, Ibiza–Formentera, Fuerteventura, La Gomera, El Hierro, Lanzarote and La Palma) one each. Ceuta and Melilla elected two seats each. Additionally, autonomous communities could appoint at least one senator each and were entitled to one additional seat per million inhabitants.

The law did not provide for by-elections to fill vacant seats; instead, any vacancies arising after the proclamation of candidates and during the legislative term were filled by the next candidates on the party lists or, when required, by designated substitutes.

=== Outgoing parliament ===
The tables below show the composition of the parliamentary groups in both chambers at the time of dissolution.

Parliamentary composition in January 1996
Congress of Deputies
Groups	Parties	Deputies	
Groups	Parties	Seats	Total
Socialist Group of the Congress	PSOE	141	159
Socialist Group of the Congress	PSC	18	159
People's Parliamentary Group in the Congress	PP	138	141
People's Parliamentary Group in the Congress	UPN	3	141
United Left–Initiative for Catalonia; Federal Parliamentary Group	IU	15	18
United Left–Initiative for Catalonia; Federal Parliamentary Group	IC	3	18
Catalan Parliamentary Group (Convergence and Union)	CDC	12	17
Catalan Parliamentary Group (Convergence and Union)	UDC	5	17
Basque Group (PNV)	EAJ/PNV	5	5
Canarian Coalition's Parliamentary Group	AIC	2	4
Canarian Coalition's Parliamentary Group	ICAN	1	4
Canarian Coalition's Parliamentary Group	CCN	1	4
Mixed Parliamentary Group	HB	2	6
Mixed Parliamentary Group	ERC	1	6
Mixed Parliamentary Group	EA	1	6
Mixed Parliamentary Group	UV	1	6
Mixed Parliamentary Group	PAR	1	6

Parliamentary composition in January 1996
Senate
Groups	Parties	Senators	
Groups	Parties	Seats	Total
People's Parliamentary Group in the Senate	PP	111	114
People's Parliamentary Group in the Senate	UPN	3	114
Socialist Parliamentary Group	PSOE	103	111
Socialist Parliamentary Group	PSC	8	111
Convergence and Union's; Catalan Parliamentary Group in the Senate	CDC	9	13
Convergence and Union's; Catalan Parliamentary Group in the Senate	UDC	4	13
Basque Nationalist Senators' Parliamentary Group	EAJ/PNV	5	5
Canarian Coalition's; Parliamentary Group in the Senate	AIC	2	5
Canarian Coalition's; Parliamentary Group in the Senate	ICAN	1	5
Canarian Coalition's; Parliamentary Group in the Senate	AM	1	5
Canarian Coalition's; Parliamentary Group in the Senate	AHI	1	5
Mixed Parliamentary Group	IU	2	8
Mixed Parliamentary Group	HB	1	8
Mixed Parliamentary Group	EA	1	8
Mixed Parliamentary Group	ERC	1	8
Mixed Parliamentary Group	UV	1	8
Mixed Parliamentary Group	CDN	1	8
Mixed Parliamentary Group	PIL	1	8

== Candidates ==
=== Nomination rules ===
Spanish citizens with the right to vote could run for election, provided that they had not been criminally imprisoned by a final sentence or convicted—whether final or not—of offences that involved loss of eligibility or disqualification from public office (such as rebellion or terrorism, when involving crimes against life, physical integrity or personal freedom). Additional causes of ineligibility applied to the following officials:

- Members of the Spanish royal family and their spouses;
- Holders of a number of senior public or institutional posts, including the heads and members of higher courts and state institutions; (Note: These comprised the Constitutional Court, the General Council of the Judiciary, the Supreme Court, the Council of State, the Court of Auditors and the Economic and Social Council.) the Ombudsman; the State's Attorney General; high-ranking officials of government departments, the Office of the Prime Minister and other state agencies; government delegates in the autonomous communities and civil governors; the director-general of RTVE; the director of the Electoral Register Office; the governor and deputy governor of the Bank of Spain; the heads of official credit institutions; and members of electoral commissions and of the Nuclear Safety Council;
- Heads of diplomatic missions abroad;
- Judges and public prosecutors in active service;
- Members of the Armed Forces and law enforcement bodies in active service.

Other ineligibility provisions also applied to a number of territorial officials in these categories within their areas of jurisdiction, as well as to employees of foreign states and members of regional governments.

Incompatibility rules included those of ineligibility, and also barred running in multiple constituencies or lists, and combining legislative roles (deputy, senator, and regional lawmaker) with each other or with:

- A number of senior public or institutional posts, including the presidency of the Competition Defence Court; and leadership positions in RTVE, government offices, public authorities (such as port authorities, hydrographic confederations, or highway concessionary companies), public entities and state-owned or publicly funded companies;
- Any other paid public or private position, except university teaching.

=== Parties and lists ===
The electoral law allowed for parties and federations registered in the interior ministry, alliances and groupings of electors to present lists of candidates. Parties and federations intending to form an alliance were required to inform the relevant electoral commission within 10 days of the election call, whereas groupings of electors needed to secure the signature of at least one percent of the electorate in the constituencies for which they sought election, disallowing electors from signing for more than one list.

Below is a list of the main parties and alliances which contested the election:

Candidacy	Parties and alliances	Leading candidate	Ideology	Previous result				Gov.	Ref.
Candidacy	Parties and alliances	Leading candidate	Ideology	Congress		Senate		Gov.	Ref.
Candidacy	Parties and alliances	Leading candidate	Ideology	Vote %	Seats	Vote %	Seats	Gov.	Ref.
PSOE	List: Spanish Socialist Workers' Party (PSOE); Socialists' Party of Catalonia (PSC)	Felipe González	Social democracy	38.8%	159	39.0% (Note: Results in the 1993 Senate election, not including Ibiza–Formentera.)	96	15	
PP	List: People's Party (PP); Navarrese People's Union (UPN); Aragonese Party (PAR)	José María Aznar	Conservatism; Christian democracy	35.4%	142	35.2% (Note: Results for PP (34.5%, 93 senators) and PAR (0.7%, 0 senators) in the 1993 Senate election.)	93	15	
IU	List: United Left (IU) – Communist Party of Spain (PCE) – Socialist Action Party (PASOC) – Republican Left (IR) – Collectives for the Unity of Workers (CUT); Initiative for Catalonia–The Greens (IC–EV) – Unified Socialist Party of Catalonia (PSUC) – Party of the Communists of Catalonia (PCC) – The Greens–Ecologist Confederation of Catalonia (EV–CEC); The Greens (LV) (Note: Only in Andalusia, Extremadura and Murcia.)	Julio Anguita	Socialism; Communism	9.6%	18	9.5%	0	15	
CiU	List: Democratic Convergence of Catalonia (CDC); Democratic Union of Catalonia (UDC)	Joaquim Molins	Catalan nationalism Centrism	4.9%	17	5.3%	10	15	
EAJ/PNV	List: Basque Nationalist Party (EAJ/PNV)	Iñaki Anasagasti	Basque nationalism Christian democracy	1.2%	5	1.3%	3	15	
CC	List: Canarian Independent Groups (AIC) – Tenerife Group of Independents (ATI) – La Palma Group of Independents (API) – Gomera Group of Independents (AGI); Nationalist Canarian Initiative (ICAN); Nationalist Canarian Centre (CCN); Canarian Nationalist Party (PNC); Independent Herrenian Group (AHI); Majorera Assembly (AM)	José Carlos Mauricio	Regionalism; Canarian nationalism Centrism	0.9%	4	0.6%	5	15	
HB	List: Popular Unity (HB) – Basque Nationalist Action (EAE/ANV)	None (Note: HB did not field a single visible leader; instead, prominence was given to the lead candidate in each of the constituencies where it ran. All elected HB members would later be deprived from their rights and prerogatives, based on them neither attending any parliamentary session nor swearing an oath to the Constitution.)	Basque independence Abertzale left Revolutionary socialism	0.9%	2	0.9%	1	15	
ERC	List: Republican Left of Catalonia (ERC)	Pilar Rahola	Catalan independence Left-wing nationalism Social democracy	0.8%	1	0.4%	0	15	
EA	List: Basque Solidarity (EA)	Begoña Lasagabaster	Basque nationalism Social democracy	0.5%	1	0.6%	0	15	
UV	List: Valencian Union (UV)	José María Chiquillo	Blaverism; Conservatism	0.5%	1	0.5%	0	15	
BNG	List: Galician Nationalist Bloc (BNG) – Galician People's Union (UPG) – Socialist Collective (CS) – Galician Nationalist Party–Galicianist Party (PNG–PG) – Nationalist Left (EN) – Inzar (Inzar) – Galician Unity (UG)	Francisco Rodríguez	Galician nationalism Left-wing nationalism	0.5%	0	0.5%	0	15	
EIFS	List: Spanish Socialist Workers' Party (PSOE) (Note: In Ibiza–Formentera.); United Left (EU); Nationalist and Ecologist Agreement (ENE); Republican Left of Catalonia (ERC); The Greens of Ibiza (EV–Eiv)	Pilar Costa	Progressivism	Did not contest		0.0% (Note: Results for PSOE (0.0%, 0 senators), IU (0.0%, 0 senators), EVIB (0.0%, 0 senators), PSM–ENE (0.0%, 0 senators) and ERC (0.0%, 0 senators) in the 1993 Senate election in Ibiza–Formentera.)	0	15	
PIL	List: Lanzarote Independents Party (PIL)	Cándido Armas	Insularism; Canarian nationalism	Did not contest				15	

There was speculation on whether prime minister Felipe González would run as PSOE's candidate for a fifth term in office, which he initially confirmed "if his party asked him to", being re-elected as PSOE leader in the party's 1994 congress. However, the judicial probe into the GAL affair and political weariness made him reconsider, and by the second half of 1995 he was said to have taken the decision not to continue. The election of Foreign Affairs minister Javier Solana—widely seen as González's most likely successor—as NATO secretary-general in December 1995 thwarted González's plans to retire, with him confirming a new run following overwhelming support from his party.

The PSOE, United Left (IU), The Greens (LV), Nationalist and Ecologist Agreement (ENE) and Republican Left of Catalonia (ERC) formed the Ibiza and Formentera in the Senate alliance for the Senate election.

== Campaign ==
=== Party slogans ===
Party or alliance	Original slogan	English translation	Ref.
PSOE	« España en positivo »	"Spain in positive"	
PP	« Con la nueva mayoría »	"With the new majority"	
IU	« Decide »	"Decide"	
CiU	« Fem que Catalunya sigui clau »	"Let's make Catalonia key"	
EAJ/PNV	« LLevamos Euskadi. Euskadirekin »	"We carry the Basque Country. With the Basque Country"	

== Opinion polls ==
Local regression trend line of poll results from 6 June 1993 to 3 March 1996, with each line corresponding to a political party.

== Voter turnout ==
The table below shows registered voter turnout during the election. Figures for election day do not include non-resident citizens, while final figures do.

Region	Time (Election day)									Final		
Region	14:00			18:00			20:00			Final		
Region	1993	1996	+/–	1993	1996	+/–	1993	1996	+/–	1993	1996	+/–
Andalusia	42.12%	41.48%	−0.64	61.65%	65.17%	+3.52	76.52%	78.48%	+1.96	76.20%	78.00%	+1.80
Aragon	44.95%	42.09%	−2.86	62.83%	62.80%	−0.03	78.48%	77.90%	−0.58	78.16%	77.46%	−0.70
Asturias	41.68%	38.05%	−3.63	62.00%	62.12%	+0.12	76.16%	77.06%	+0.90	75.43%	75.91%	+0.48
Balearics	41.46%	39.45%	−2.01	56.61%	59.38%	+2.77	72.78%	71.91%	−0.87	72.56%	71.63%	−0.93
Basque Country	37.92%	37.20%	−0.72	54.60%	56.42%	+1.82	69.99%	71.91%	+1.92	69.73%	71.53%	+1.80
Canary Islands	31.24%	29.56%	−1.68	51.59%	50.42%	−1.17	69.34%	69.79%	+0.45	68.92%	69.14%	+0.22
Cantabria	38.60%	39.30%	+0.70	62.49%	64.88%	+2.39	79.61%	80.12%	+0.51	78.98%	79.31%	+0.33
Castile and León	43.39%	40.91%	−2.48	64.42%	65.19%	+0.77	78.92%	79.94%	+1.02	78.27%	79.01%	+0.74
Castilla–La Mancha	45.59%	43.72%	−1.87	67.35%	69.54%	+2.19	82.37%	83.43%	+1.06	82.13%	83.09%	+0.96
Catalonia	41.68%	39.93%	−1.75	59.16%	61.05%	+1.89	75.69%	76.98%	+1.29	75.37%	76.52%	+1.15
Extremadura	47.49%	46.53%	−0.96	66.14%	69.61%	+3.47	80.89%	82.96%	+2.07	80.46%	82.33%	+1.87
Galicia	34.74%	33.09%	−1.65	55.62%	60.03%	+4.41	71.30%	73.84%	+2.54	69.64%	71.40%	+1.76
La Rioja	47.45%	44.34%	−3.11	65.23%	65.91%	+0.68	80.37%	81.53%	+1.16	80.00%	80.92%	+0.92
Madrid	40.67%	39.12%	−1.55	64.20%	65.01%	+0.81	78.99%	80.18%	+1.19	78.92%	79.59%	+0.67
Murcia	47.65%	45.01%	−2.64	66.19%	70.04%	+3.85	81.96%	82.52%	+0.56	81.56%	82.00%	+0.44
Navarre	40.00%	35.51%	−4.49	57.08%	57.37%	+0.29	74.05%	74.07%	+0.02	73.58%	73.45%	−0.13
Valencian Community	48.43%	45.75%	−2.68	68.11%	68.81%	+0.70	82.10%	82.13%	+0.03	81.71%	81.66%	−0.05
Ceuta	35.49%	33.51%	−1.98	50.07%	50.74%	+0.67	62.55%	64.29%	+1.74	62.13%	63.81%	+1.68
Melilla	35.06%	32.21%	−2.85	51.37%	49.73%	−1.64	66.87%	62.84%	−4.03	66.14%	61.95%	−4.19
Total	41.83%	40.10%	−1.73	61.57%	63.45%	+1.88	76.94%	78.08%	+1.14	76.44%	77.38%	+0.94

== Results ==
=== Congress of Deputies ===
← Summary of the 3 March 1996 Congress of Deputies election results →
Parties and alliances	Popular vote			Seats	
Parties and alliances	Votes	%	±pp	Total	+/−
People's Party (PP)^{1}	9,716,006	38.79	+3.42	156	+14
Spanish Socialist Workers' Party (PSOE)	9,425,678	37.63	−1.15	141	−18
United Left (IU)	2,639,774	10.54	+0.99	21	+3
Convergence and Union (CiU)	1,151,633	4.60	−0.34	16	−1
Basque Nationalist Party (EAJ/PNV)	318,951	1.27	+0.03	5	±0
Canarian Coalition (CC)	220,418	0.88	±0.00	4	±0
Galician Nationalist Bloc (BNG)	220,147	0.88	+0.34	2	+2
Popular Unity (HB)	181,304	0.72	−0.16	2	±0
Republican Left of Catalonia (ERC)	167,641	0.67	−0.13	1	±0
Andalusian Party (PA)^{2}	134,800	0.54	−0.05	0	±0
Basque Solidarity (EA)	115,861	0.46	−0.09	1	±0
Valencian Union (UV)	91,575	0.37	−0.11	1	±0
The European Greens (LVE)	61,689	0.25	−0.54	0	±0
Aragonese Union (CHA)	49,739	0.20	+0.17	0	±0
Centrist Union (UC)	44,771	0.18	−1.58	0	±0
Valencian People's Union–Nationalist Bloc (UPV–BN)	26,777	0.11	−0.06	0	±0
Nationalists of the Balearic Islands (PSM–ENE)	24,644	0.10	+0.01	0	±0
The Greens–Green Group (LV–GV)	17,177	0.07	New	0	±0
Convergence of Democrats of Navarre (CDN)	17,020	0.07	New	0	±0
Workers' Revolutionary Party (PRT)^{3}	14,854	0.06	−0.07	0	±0
Communist Party of the Peoples of Spain (PCPE)	14,513	0.06	+0.02	0	±0
Humanist Party (PH)	13,482	0.05	+0.01	0	±0
Asturianist Party (PAS)	12,213	0.05	±0.00	0	±0
Authentic Spanish Phalanx (FEA)	12,114	0.05	+0.05	0	±0
Leonese People's Union (UPL)	12,049	0.05	−0.01	0	±0
Basque Citizen Initiative (ICV–Gorordo)	11,833	0.05	New	0	±0
The Greens of Madrid (LVM)	8,483	0.03	New	0	±0
Extremaduran Coalition (CEx)^{4}	7,312	0.03	−0.03	0	±0
Majorcan Union (UM)	6,943	0.03	−0.01	0	±0
Commoners' Land–Castilian Nationalist Party (TC–PNC)	6,206	0.02	±0.00	0	±0
Riojan Party (PR)	6,065	0.02	−0.01	0	±0
Ecologist Party of Catalonia (PEC)	4,305	0.02	−0.02	0	±0
Regionalist Unity of Castile and León (URCL)	4,061	0.02	+0.01	0	±0
Andalusian Nation (NA)	3,505	0.01	New	0	±0
Alliance for National Unity (AUN)	3,397	0.01	New	0	±0
Salamanca–Zamora–León–PREPAL (PREPAL)	2,762	0.01	±0.00	0	±0
SOS Nature (SOS)	2,753	0.01	New	0	±0
Republican Coalition (CR)^{5}	2,744	0.01	−0.02	0	±0
Popular Front of the Canary Islands (FREPIC)	2,567	0.01	New	0	±0
Socialist Party of the People of Ceuta (PSPC)	2,365	0.01	+0.01	0	±0
Regionalist Party of Castilla-La Mancha (PRCM)	2,279	0.01	New	0	±0
Galician People's Front (FPG)	2,065	0.01	New	0	±0
Independent Socialists of Extremadura (SIEx)	1,678	0.01	New	0	±0
Madrilenian Independent Regional Party (PRIM)	1,671	0.01	±0.00	0	±0
Red–Green Party (PRV)	1,656	0.01	New	0	±0
Independent Spanish Phalanx (FEI)	1,550	0.01	±0.00	0	±0
New Region (NR)	1,452	0.01	New	0	±0
Republican Action (AR)	1,237	0.00	−0.01	0	±0
Citizen Independent Platform of Catalonia (PICC)	1,229	0.00	New	0	±0
Valencian Nationalist Left (ENV)	1,023	0.00	−0.01	0	±0
Party of El Bierzo (PB)	1,000	0.00	−0.01	0	±0
Nationalist Canarian Party (PCN)	722	0.00	New	0	±0
Alicantine Provincial Union (UPRA)	651	0.00	±0.00	0	±0
Democratic Andalusian Unity (UAD)	627	0.00	New	0	±0
Citizen Democratic Action (ADEC)	598	0.00	New	0	±0
Voice of the Andalusian People (VDPA)	529	0.00	New	0	±0
European Nation State (N)	495	0.00	New	0	±0
Social and Autonomist Liberal Group (ALAS)	402	0.00	New	0	±0
Balearic Alliance (ABA)	379	0.00	New	0	±0
Regionalist Party of Guadalajara (PRGU)	338	0.00	±0.00	0	±0
Spanish Autonomous League (LAE)	296	0.00	New	0	±0
Aragonese Social Dynamic (DSA)	265	0.00	New	0	±0
Party of The People (LG)	243	0.00	±0.00	0	±0
Inter-Zamoran Party (PIZ)	215	0.00	New	0	±0
Nationalist Party of Melilla (PNM)	200	0.00	New	0	±0
Centrists of the Valencian Community (CCV)	0	0.00	New	0	±0
Revolutionary Workers' Party (POR)	0	0.00	−0.03	0	±0
Party of Self-employed of Spain (PAE)	0	0.00	New	0	±0
Tenerife Independent Familiar Groups (AFIT)	0	0.00	New	0	±0
Blank ballots	243,345	0.97	+0.17		
Total	25,046,276			350	±0
Valid votes	25,046,276	99.50	+0.04		
Invalid votes	125,782	0.50	−0.04		
Votes cast / turnout	25,172,058	77.38	+0.94		
Abstentions	7,359,775	22.62	−0.94		
Registered voters	32,531,833				
Sources
Footnotes: ^{1} People's Party results are compared to the combined totals of the People's Party and the Aragonese Party in the 1993 election.; ^{2} Andalusian Party results are compared to the combined totals of Andalusian Party and Andalusian Progress Party in the 1993 election.; ^{3} Workers' Revolutionary Party results are compared to Workers' Socialist Party totals in the 1993 election.; ^{4} Extremaduran Coalition results are compared to the combined totals of United Extremadura and Extremaduran Regionalist Party in the 1993 election.; ^{5} Republican Coalition results are compared to Coalition for a New Socialist Party totals in the 1993 election.

Popular vote
PP	38.79%
PSOE	37.63%
IU	10.54%
CiU	4.60%
EAJ/PNV	1.27%
CC	0.88%
BNG	0.88%
HB	0.72%
ERC	0.67%
EA	0.46%
UV	0.37%
Others	2.21%
Blank ballots	0.97%

Seats
PP	44.57%
PSOE	40.29%
IU	6.00%
CiU	4.57%
EAJ/PNV	1.43%
CC	1.14%
BNG	0.57%
HB	0.57%
ERC	0.29%
EA	0.29%
UV	0.29%

=== Senate ===
← Summary of the 3 March 1996 Senate of Spain election results →
Parties and alliances	Popular vote			Seats	
Parties and alliances	Votes	%	±pp	Total	+/−
People's Party (PP)^{1}	26,788,282	39.04	+3.87	112	+19
Spanish Socialist Workers' Party (PSOE)	25,865,206	37.70	−1.32	81	−15
United Left (IU)	6,851,023	9.99	+0.52	0	±0
Convergence and Union (CiU)	3,338,737	4.87	−0.43	8	−2
Basque Nationalist Party (EAJ/PNV)	918,692	1.34	+0.04	4	+1
Galician Nationalist Bloc (BNG)	670,346	0.98	+0.36	0	±0
Popular Unity (HB)	516,007	0.75	−0.17	0	−1
Republican Left of Catalonia (ERC)	493,480	0.72	+0.35	0	±0
Andalusian Party (PA)^{2}	415,676	0.61	−0.07	0	±0
Canarian Coalition (CC)	388,366	0.57	−0.04	1	−4
Basque Solidarity (EA)	337,911	0.49	−0.09	0	±0
Valencian Union (UV)	280,383	0.41	−0.12	0	±0
Aragonese Union (CHA)	136,157	0.20	+0.16	0	±0
Centrist Union (UC)	129,432	0.19	−1.63	0	±0
The European Greens (LVE)	127,576	0.19	−0.69	0	±0
Valencian People's Union–Nationalist Bloc (UPV–BN)	93,337	0.14	−0.07	0	±0
The Greens–Green Group (LV–GV)	67,439	0.10	New	0	±0
Convergence of Democrats of Navarre (CDN)	54,016	0.08	New	0	±0
Nationalists of the Balearic Islands (PSM–ENE)	50,928	0.07	+0.01	0	±0
Leonese People's Union (UPL)	48,214	0.07	−0.02	0	±0
Asturianist Party (PAS)	41,127	0.06	−0.01	0	±0
Communist Party of the Peoples of Spain (PCPE)	34,495	0.05	±0.00	0	±0
Alliance for National Unity (AUN)	32,451	0.05	New	0	±0
Basque Citizen Initiative (ICV–Gorordo)	31,632	0.05	New	0	±0
Extremaduran Coalition (CEx)^{3}	30,213	0.04	−0.05	0	±0
Authentic Spanish Phalanx (FEA)	27,999	0.04	+0.03	0	±0
Ecologist Party of Catalonia (PEC)	24,662	0.04	−0.04	0	±0
Humanist Party (PH)	24,149	0.04	+0.02	0	±0
Ibiza and Formentera in the Senate (EIFS)	21,365	0.03	New	1	+1
Riojan Party (PR)	20,172	0.03	−0.01	0	±0
Commoners' Land–Castilian Nationalist Party (TC–PNC)	20,119	0.03	±0.00	0	±0
Majorcan Union (UM)	18,944	0.03	−0.01	0	±0
Salamanca–Zamora–León–PREPAL (PREPAL)	17,024	0.02	±0.00	0	±0
Republican Coalition (CR)^{4}	15,958	0.02	±0.00	0	±0
Independent Spanish Phalanx (FEI)	14,963	0.02	±0.00	0	±0
Workers' Revolutionary Party (PRT)^{5}	14,618	0.02	−0.05	0	±0
Regionalist Unity of Castile and León (URCL)	14,362	0.02	±0.00	0	±0
Lanzarote Independents Party (PIL)	13,161	0.02	New	1	+1
The Greens of Madrid (LVM)	13,080	0.02	New	0	±0
Andalusian Nation (NA)	12,803	0.02	New	0	±0
Nationalist Party of Castile and León (PANCAL)	10,268	0.01	+0.01	0	±0
Party of El Bierzo (PB)	8,641	0.01	±0.00	0	±0
Independent Socialists of Extremadura (SIEx)	8,018	0.01	New	0	±0
Madrilenian Independent Regional Party (PRIM)	6,409	0.01	−0.01	0	±0
Republican Action (AR)	6,398	0.01	−0.01	0	±0
Red–Green Party (PRV)	6,232	0.01	New	0	±0
SOS Nature (SOS)	6,149	0.01	New	0	±0
Regionalist Party of Castilla-La Mancha (PRCM)	6,106	0.01	New	0	±0
Democratic Party of the People (PDEP)	6,061	0.01	New	0	±0
Popular Front of the Canary Islands (FREPIC)	4,764	0.01	New	0	±0
Socialist Party of the People of Ceuta (PSPC)	4,107	0.01	+0.01	0	±0
Natural Culture (CN)	3,986	0.01	+0.01	0	±0
Galician People's Front (FPG)	3,727	0.01	New	0	±0
Citizen Independent Platform of Catalonia (PICC)	3,408	0.00	New	0	±0
Independent Candidacy of Valladolid (CIV)	3,270	0.00	New	0	±0
Join Action (AY)	2,573	0.00	New	0	±0
Alicantine Provincial Union (UPRA)	2,536	0.00	New	0	±0
Voice of the Andalusian People (VDPA)	2,352	0.00	New	0	±0
Aragonese Unity (UA)	2,305	0.00	New	0	±0
Valencian Nationalist Left (ENV)	2,080	0.00	−0.01	0	±0
National Workers' Party (PNT)	1,788	0.00	New	0	±0
New Region (NR)	1,754	0.00	New	0	±0
Revolutionary Workers' Party (POR)	1,438	0.00	−0.02	0	±0
Regionalist Party of Guadalajara (PRGU)	1,305	0.00	±0.00	0	±0
Citizen Democratic Action (ADEC)	1,187	0.00	New	0	±0
Social and Autonomist Liberal Group (ALAS)	1,099	0.00	New	0	±0
Nationalist Canarian Party (PCN)	934	0.00	New	0	±0
Inter-Zamoran Party (PIZ)	912	0.00	New	0	±0
Iberian Unity (UI)	883	0.00	New	0	±0
European Nation State (N)	816	0.00	New	0	±0
Democratic Andalusian Unity (UAD)	783	0.00	New	0	±0
Spanish Autonomous League (LAE)	610	0.00	New	0	±0
Nationalist Party of Melilla (PNM)	595	0.00	New	0	±0
Aragonese Social Dynamic (DSA)	581	0.00	New	0	±0
Independents of Menorca (INME)	558	0.00	New	0	±0
Proverist Party (PPr)	373	0.00	±0.00	0	±0
Spanish Action (AE)	256	0.00	±0.00	0	±0
Clean Hands Project (PML)	231	0.00	New	0	±0
Party of The People (LG)	125	0.00	New	0	±0
Tenerife Independent Familiar Groups (AFIT)	0	0.00	New	0	±0
Centrists of the Valencian Community (CCV)	0	0.00	New	0	±0
Blank ballots (Note: The percentage of blank ballots is calculated over the official number of valid votes cast, irrespective of the total number of votes shown as a result of adding up the individual results for each party.)	482,601	1.97	+0.34		
Total	68,612,724			208	±0
Valid votes	24,502,854	97.41	−0.29		
Invalid votes	652,656	2.59	+0.29		
Votes cast / turnout	25,155,510	77.33	+0.84		
Abstentions	7,376,323	22.67	−0.84		
Registered voters	32,531,833				
Sources
Footnotes: ^{1} People's Party results are compared to the combined totals of the People's Party and the Aragonese Party in the 1993 election.; ^{2} Andalusian Party results are compared to the combined totals of Andalusian Party and Andalusian Progress Party in the 1993 election.; ^{3} Extremaduran Coalition results are compared to the combined totals of United Extremadura and Extremaduran Regionalist Party in the 1993 election.; ^{4} Republican Coalition results are compared to Coalition for a New Socialist Party totals in the 1993 election.; ^{5} Workers' Revolutionary Party results are compared to Workers' Socialist Party totals in the 1993 election.

Popular vote
PP	39.04%
PSOE	37.70%
IU	9.99%
CiU	4.87%
EAJ/PNV	1.34%
CC	0.57%
EIFS	0.03%
PIL	0.02%
Others	5.75%
Blank ballots	1.97%

Seats
PP	53.85%
PSOE	38.94%
CiU	3.85%
EAJ/PNV	1.92%
CC	0.48%
EIFS	0.48%
PIL	0.48%

=== Maps ===
Election results by constituency (Congress).

Vote winner strength by constituency (Congress).

Vote winner strength by autonomous community (Congress).

== Aftermath ==
=== Government formation ===
Investiture; Congress of Deputies; Nomination of José María Aznar (PP)
Ballot →	4 May 1996
Required majority →	176 out of 350
Yes: • PP (156); • CiU (16); • PNV (5); • CC (4)	181 / 350
No: • PSOE (141); • IU–IC (21); • BNG (2); • ERC (1); • EA (1)	166 / 350
Abstentions: • UV (1)	1 / 350
Absentees: • HB (2)	2 / 350

== Bibliography ==
Legislation

- Constitución Española (Constitution). Official State Gazette (in Spanish). 27 December 1978 [version as of 28 August 1992]. BOE-A-1978-31229.
- Ley Orgánica 5/1985, de 19 de junio, del Régimen Electoral General (Organic Law 5/1985). Official State Gazette (in Spanish). 19 June 1985 [version as of 24 November 1995]. BOE-A-1985-11672.
- Real Decreto 1/1996, de 8 de enero, de disolución del Congreso de los Diputados y del Senado y de convocatoria de elecciones (Royal Decree 1/1996). Official State Gazette (in Spanish). 8 January 1996. BOE-A-1996-508.

Other

- Carreras de Odriozola, Albert; Tafunell Sambola, Xavier (2005) [1989]. Estadísticas históricas de España, siglos XIX-XX (PDF) (in Spanish). Vol. 1 (II ed.). Bilbao: Fundación BBVA. pp. 1072–1097. ISBN 84-96515-00-1. Archived from the original (PDF) on 24 September 2015.
