= Cercas =

Cercas is a surname. Notable people with the surname include:

- Alejandro Cercas (born 1949), Spanish politician
- Javier Cercas (born 1962), Spanish writer and professor
