= 1994 PSOE federal party congress =

- 18−20 March 1994

888 delegates in the Federal Congress Plurality of delegates needed to win
- Turnout: 837 (94.3%)
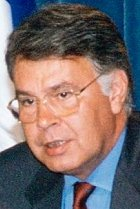

Candidate	Felipe González	Blank ballots
Executive	748 (91.0%)	74 (9.0%)
Committee	761 (92.6%)	61 (7.4%)
Party leader before election
Felipe González
Party leader after
election
Felipe González

The Spanish Socialist Workers' Party (PSOE) held its 33rd federal congress in Madrid from 18 to 20 March 1994, to renovate its governing bodies—including the post of secretary-general, which amounted to that of party leader—and establish the party platform and policy until the next congress.

The congress was notable in that, while there was no major opposition to Felipe González's re-election as party leader, it saw a major internal struggle for party control between supporters of former deputy prime minister and PSOE deputy secretary-general Alfonso Guerra (guerristas) and González's allies (renovadores, Spanish for "renovators").

The congress' resulted in a victory for the "renovators", who succeeded in wrestling organic control away from Guerra's faction.

== Candidates ==
Candidate	Notable positions	Announced	Ref.
=== Proposed ===
Candidates who were officially proposed to contest the party congress.
Felipe González (age 52)	Prime Minister of Spain (since 1982); Secretary-General of the PSOE (1974–1979 and since 1979); Member of the Congress of Deputies for Madrid and Seville (since 1977); President pro tempore of the Council of the European Union (1989); Spokesperson of the Congress Socialist Parliamentary Group (1977–1979)	18 March 1994	

=== Declined ===
The individuals in this section were the subject of speculation about their possible candidacy, but publicly denied or recanted interest in running:

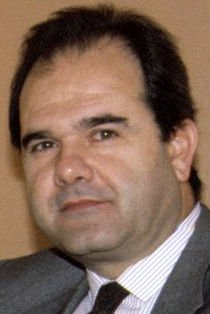
Manuel Chaves

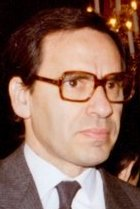
Alfonso Guerra

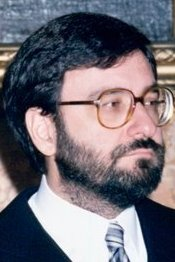
Narcís Serra

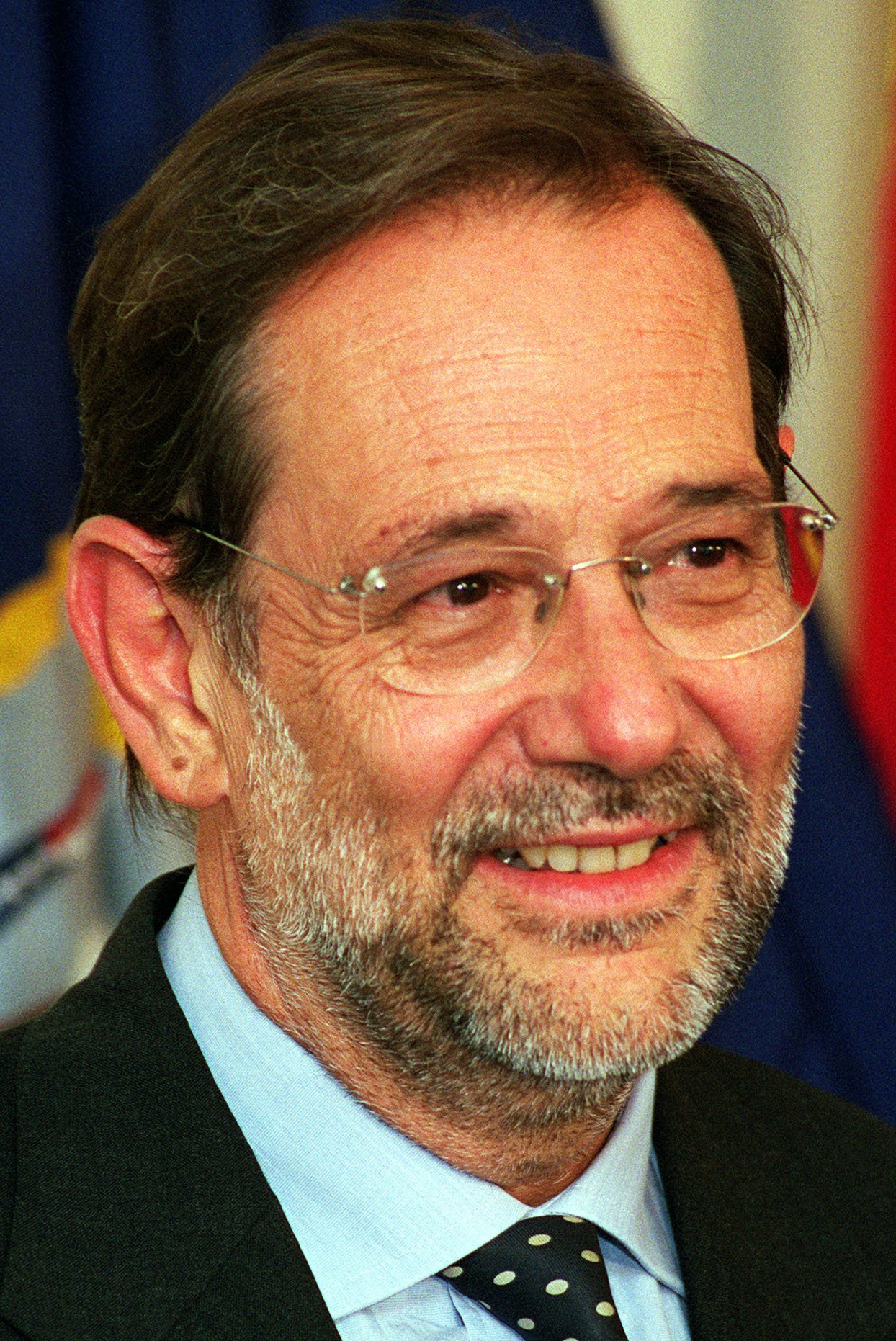
Javier Solana

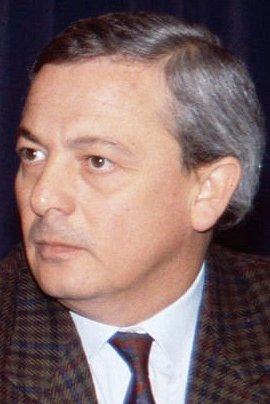
Carlos Solchaga
- Manuel Chaves (age 48) — President of the Regional Government of Andalusia (since 1990); Member of the Parliament of Andalusia for Cádiz (since 1990); Member of the PSOE Executive Commission (1981–1984 and since 1990); Minister of Labour and Social Security of Spain (1986–1990); Member of the Congress of Deputies for Cádiz (1977–1990); Secretary of Economy of the PSOE (1984–1988).
- Alfonso Guerra (age 53) — Deputy Secretary-General of the PSOE (since 1979); Member of the Congress of Deputies for Seville (since 1977); Deputy Prime Minister of Spain (1982–1991); Spokesperson of the Congress Socialist Parliamentary Group (1979–1981); Secretary of Organization of the PSOE (1976–1979); Secretary of Press and Information of the PSOE (1975–1976); Member of the PSOE Executive Commission (1970–1975).
- Narcís Serra (age 50) — Deputy Prime Minister of Spain (since 1991); Member of the Congress of Deputies for Barcelona (since 1986); Minister of Defence of Spain (1982–1991); Mayor of Barcelona (1979–1982); City Councillor of Barcelona (1979–1982); Minister of Territorial Policy and Public Works of Catalonia (1977–1979).
- Javier Solana (age 51) — Minister of Foreign Affairs of Spain (since 1992); Member of the Congress of Deputies for Madrid (since 1977); Minister of Education and Science of Spain (1988–1992); Spokesperson of the Government of Spain (1985–1988); Minister of Culture of Spain (1982–1988); Member of the PSOE Executive Commission (1981–1984); Secretary of Studies and Programs of the PSOE (1979–1981); Secretary of Press and Information of the PSOE (1976–1979).
- Carlos Solchaga (age 49) — Spokesperson of the PSOE Group in the Congress of Deputies (since 1993); Member of the Congress of Deputies for Navarre (since 1982); Minister of Economy and Finance of Spain (1985–1993); Minister of Industry and Energy of Spain (1982–1985); Member of the Congress of Deputies for Álava (1980–1982); Minister of Trade of the Basque Country (1979–1980).

== Delegate estimations ==
Political affinity of delegates among the main internal currents, by region:

Region	Total	Renovadores		Guerristas		Other	
Region	Total	Del.	%	Del.	%	Del.	%
Andalusia	230	156	67.83	74	32.17	0	0.00
Aragon	35	8	22.86	27	77.14	0	0.00
Asturias	26	6	23.08	20	76.92	0	0.00
Balearic Islands	9	7	77.78	1	11.11	1	1.11
Basque Country	24	0	0.00	0	0.00	24	100.00
Canary Islands	41	5	12.20	6	14.63	30	73.17
Cantabria	12	3	25.00	9	75.00	0	0.00
Castile and León	50	38	76.00	11	22.00	1	2.00
Castilla–La Mancha	64	62	96.88	2	3.12	0	0.00
Catalonia	60	60	100.00	0	0.00	0	0.00
Ceuta	3	3	100.00	0	0.00	0	0.00
Extremadura	51	19	37.25	32	62.75	0	0.00
Galicia	53	18	33.96	35	66.04	0	0.00
La Rioja	3	2	66.67	0	0.00	1	33.33
Madrid	52	39	75.00	13	25.00	0	0.00
Melilla	3	1	33.33	2	66.67	0	0.00
Murcia	45	34	75.56	11	24.44	0	0.00
Navarre	7	5	71.43	0	0.00	2	28.57
Valencian Community	106	106	100.00	0	0.00	0	0.00
Europe	5	0	0.00	0	0.00	5	100.00
Americas	8	0	0.00	0	0.00	8	100.00
JSE	10	10	100.00	0	0.00	0	0.00
Total	897	582	64.88	243	27.09	72	8.03

== Results ==
=== Overall ===
Summary of the 19−20 March 1994 congress results
Candidate	Executive		Committee	
Candidate	Votes	%	Votes	%
Felipe González	748	91.00	761	92.58
Blank ballots	74	9.00	61	7.42
Total	822		822	
Valid votes	822	98.21	822	98.21
Invalid votes	15	1.79	15	1.79
Votes cast / turnout	837	94.26	837	94.26
Not voting	51	5.74	51	5.74
Total delegates	888		888	

Vote by delegates (Executive Commission)
González	91.00%
Blank ballots	9.00%

Vote by delegates (Federal Committee)
González	92.58%
Blank ballots	7.42%

=== Executive composition ===
The Executive Commission was renewed by half, with González's supporters now in the majority both in the permanent committee—which brought together the responsibles for each area—and in the plenary session. Alfonso Guerra managed to retain relevant responsibilities for his supporters and relocated those who had been relieved of their duties either among the members without portfolio or within the federal committee.

Executive posts:

- Leader
- Deputy leader
- Permanent commission

PSOE federal executive commission
Post	Officeholder
President	Ramón Rubial
Secretary-General	Felipe González
Deputy Secretary-General	Alfonso Guerra
Secretary of Organization	Ciprià Ciscar
Secretary of Political and Institutional Relations	Txiki Benegas
Secretary of Administration and Finance	Francisco Fernández Marugán
Secretary of International Relations	Raimon Obiols
Secretary of Studies and Programs	Joaquín Almunia
Secretary of Relations with Society	Alejandro Cercas
Secretary of Training	Ludolfo Paramio
Secretary of Women Participation	Carmen Hermosín
Member without portfolio	José Antonio Amate
Member without portfolio	Javier Barrero
Member without portfolio	José Bono
Member without portfolio	Abel Caballero
Member without portfolio	María José Calderón
Member without portfolio	Manuel Chaves
Member without portfolio	Manuela de Madre
Member without portfolio	Clementina Díez de Baldeón
Member without portfolio	Juan Manuel Eguiagaray
Member without portfolio	Matilde Fernández
Member without portfolio	Josefa Frau
Member without portfolio	Ludivina García Arias
Member without portfolio	Carmen García Bloise
Member without portfolio	Blanca García Manzanares
Member without portfolio	Ramón Jáuregui
Member without portfolio	Joan Lerma
Member without portfolio	Luis Martínez Noval
Member without portfolio	Josefa Pardo
Member without portfolio	Jesús Quijano
Member without portfolio	Juan Carlos Rodríguez Ibarra
Member without portfolio	Ana Ruiz-Tagle
Member without portfolio	Jerónimo Saavedra
Member without portfolio	Paquita Sauquillo
Member without portfolio	Narcís Serra
Member without portfolio	Javier Solana

Affiliation by party faction
Faction	No.	Members
Renovators (renovadores)	26	Almunia, Barrero, Bono, Calderón, Cercas, Chaves, Ciscar, de Madre, Díez de Baldeón, Eguiagaray, Frau, García Bloise, García Manzanares, González, Hermosín, Jáuregui, Lerma, Obiols, Paramio, Quijano, Rubial, Ruiz-Tagle, Saavedra, Sauquillo, Serra, Solana
Guerrists (guerristas)	10	Amate, Benegas, Caballero, Fernández, Fernández Marugán, García Arias, Guerra, Ibarra, Martínez Noval, Pardo

== Bibliography ==
- Pascual Bueno, Ernesto M. (2016). Selección de Líderes y Candidatos a la Presidencia del Gobierno (1976-2016). "El jardín secreto del PSOE" (PDF) (PhD) (in Spanish). Barcelona: Universidad Autónoma de Barcelona.
