= Roldán affair =

Corruption scandal in Spain

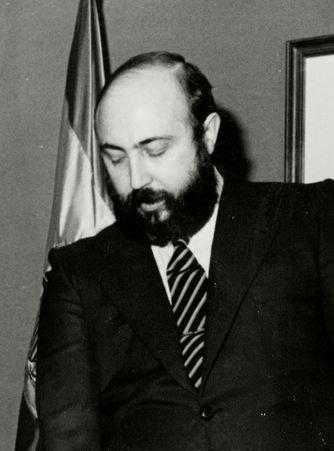
Luis Roldán in 1986

The Roldán affair (Spanish: caso Roldán) was a political corruption case in Spain, involving a former director general of the Civil Guard Luis Roldán, and the unjustified increase in his assets since assuming office in 1986. The scandal uncovered an illegal plot within the Interior ministry of Spain during the premiership of Felipe González to pay undeclared bonuses to high-ranking officials, using the government's black budget.

In November 1993, Spanish daily Diario 16 unveiled that the Luis Roldán had amassed a large fortune during his time as Civil Guard's director, which he proved unable to legally justify. In March 1994, El Mundo revealed that officers from the interior ministry had used money from the "reserved funds"—government slush funds originally intended to finance operations against terrorism and drug trafficking and not subject to publicity, justification or external oversight—to make bonus payments to high-ranking officers from the ministry, with Roldán's name appearing among the beneficiaries. In April that year, both media revealed that former Navarrese president Gabriel Urralburu had collected millions in kickbacks through the awarding of public works during his tenure, with Roldán having also benefitted from it. Roldán fled the country to escape legal prosecution, forcing interior minister Antoni Asunción's resignation for failing to monitor him.

During his time on the run, Roldán admitted to having been paid bonuses from the reserved funds together with other high-ranking Interior ministry (including former minister José Luis Corcuera) and that he was told that prime minister González was "aware of everything". Roldán was captured on 27 February 1995 in Laos, amidst claims that he had reached an agreement with the PSOE government (in what would be coined as the "Laos papers") to charge the former with just two crimes—bribery and embezzlement—in exchange for his voluntary surrender, a claim rejected by the Spanish government. Roldán would later be convicted for these crimes as well as fraud, forgery and tax evasion.
