= Opinion polling for the 1996 Spanish general election =

In the run up to the 1996 Spanish general election, various organisations carried out opinion polling to gauge voting intention in Spain during the term of the 5th Cortes Generales. Results of such polls are displayed in this article. The date range for these opinion polls is from the previous general election, held on 6 June 1993, to the day the next election was held, on 3 March 1996.

Voting intention estimates refer mainly to a hypothetical Congress of Deputies election. Polls are listed in reverse chronological order, showing the most recent first and using the dates when the survey fieldwork was done, as opposed to the date of publication. Where the fieldwork dates are unknown, the date of publication is given instead. The highest percentage figure in each polling survey is displayed with its background shaded in the leading party's colour. If a tie ensues, this is applied to the figures with the highest percentages. The "Lead" columns on the right shows the percentage-point difference between the parties with the highest percentages in a poll.

== Electoral polling ==
=== Nationwide polling ===
==== Graphical summary ====
Local regression trend line of poll results from 6 June 1993 to 3 March 1996, with each line corresponding to a political party.

==== Voting intention estimates ====
The table below lists nationwide voting intention estimates. Refusals are generally excluded from the party vote percentages, while question wording and the treatment of "don't know" responses and those not intending to vote may vary between polling organisations. When available, seat projections determined by the polling organisations are displayed below (or in place of) the percentages in a smaller font; 176 seats were required for an absolute majority in the Congress of Deputies.

Color key:

Poll conducted after legal ban on opinion polls Exit poll

| Polling firm/Commissioner | Fieldwork date | Sample size | Turnout | PSOE | PP | IU | CiU | CDS | PNV | CC | HB | ERC | PAR | EA | BNG | UV | PA | Lead |
|---|---|---|---|---|---|---|---|---|---|---|---|---|---|---|---|---|---|---|
| 1996 general election | 3 Mar 1996 | —N/a | 77.4 | 37.6; 141 | 38.8; 156 | 10.5; 21 | 4.6; 16 | 0.2; 0 | 1.3; 5 | 0.9; 4 | 0.7; 2 | 0.7; 1 | (Note: Within PP.) | 0.5; 1 | 0.9; 2 | 0.4; 1 | 0.5; 0 | 1.2 |
| Eco Consulting/RTVE | 3 Mar 1996 | ? | ? | 34.8; 125/135 | 40.2; 160/171 | 11.2; 22/25 | 4.4; 14/15 | – | 1.4; 6/7 | – | – | 0.7; 1 | | – | – | – | – | 5.4 |
| Demoscopia/Tele 5 | 3 Mar 1996 | ? | ? | 34.7; 124/131 | 40.7; 167/174 | 11.2; 19/24 | 4.6; 14/15 | – | 1.1; 5/6 | – | – | 0.8; 1 | | – | – | – | – | 6.0 |
| Sigma Dos/Antena 3 | 3 Mar 1996 | ? | ? | 33.7; 120/132 | 41.1; 164/174 | 11.4; 22/25 | 4.2; 13/14 | – | 1.6; 6/7 | 0.9; 4 | 0.8; 2 | 0.8; 1 | | 0.5; 1 | 0.9; 2 | 0.5; 1 | – | 7.4 |
| CIS | 27 Feb–1 Mar 1996 | 2,491 | 76.0 | 36.8 | 39.2 | 11.5 | 4.0 | – | 0.9 | – | – | – | | – | – | – | – | 2.4 |
| Inner Line | 16–22 Feb 1996 | 6,048 | ? | 36.1; 136/142 | 40.6; 158/166 | 11.9; 21/22 | 4.4; 14/15 | – | ? 5 | – | – | – | | – | – | – | – | 4.5 |
| Demoscopia/El País | 17–21 Feb 1996 | 3,500 | 80 | 33.4; 118/128 | 42.4; 170/178 | 12.3; 24/27 | 4.2; 13/15 | – | 1.1; 5/6 | 0.8; 3 | 0.5; 2 | 0.9; 1 | | 0.4; 1 | 0.6; 1 | 0.3; 0 | 0.6; 0/1 | 9.0 |
| CIS | 12–21 Feb 1996 | 6,642 | 75.8 | 34.1 | 41.2 | 11.4 | 4.5 | – | 1.3 | – | – | – | | – | – | – | – | 7.1 |
| Metra Seis/Colpisa | 10–21 Feb 1996 | 15,000 | 77–79 | 32.2; 116/130 | 41.7; 173/181 | 11.9; 20/27 | 4.2; 14/16 | – | 1.3; 5/6 | 0.7; 3 | 0.7; 1/2 | 0.8; 1/2 | | 0.5; 1 | 0.7; 1/2 | 0.3; 0/1 | 0.5; 0/1 | 9.5 |
| Opina/La Vanguardia | 19–20 Feb 1996 | 2,369 | ? | 35.0; 135/145 | 41.0; 160/170 | 10.5; 19/21 | 4.5; 14/15 | – | 1.5; 5/6 | – | – | 1.0; 1/2 | | – | – | – | – | 6.0 |
| Sigma Dos–Vox Pública/El Mundo | 15–20 Feb 1996 | 12,990 | ? | 31.4; 113/123 | 42.3; 170/179 | 12.2; 25/29 | 4.2; 14/15 | – | 1.5; 6/7 | 0.6; 2/3 | 0.7; 2 | 0.8; 1 | | ? 1 | 0.7; 0 | ? 1 | – | 10.9 |
| Metra Seis/Colpisa | 19 Feb 1996 | 7,566 | 79.5 | 32.0– 33.0; 120/128 | 41.0– 42.0; 170/175 | 12.0; 23/29 | 4.0; 14 | – | ? 5 | ? 3 | ? 2 | ? 1 | | ? 1 | ? 1/2 | ? 0/1 | – | 9.0 |
| Vox Pública/El Periódico | 11–16 Feb 1996 | 12,069 | 84 | 33.5; 119/129 | 41.2; 165/175 | 11.7; 18/27 | 4.5; 14/16 | – | 1.3; 5 | 0.7; 2/3 | 0.7; 2 | 0.9; 1/2 | | 0.5; 1/2 | 0.6; 1 | 0.4; 0/1 | – | 7.7 |
| ABC | 14 Feb 1996 | 25,000 | ? | ? 118/119 | ? 172 | ? 30/31 | ? 13 | – | ? 7 | ? 3 | ? 2 | ? 1 | | ? 1 | ? 2 | – | – | ? |
| PSOE | 6–10 Feb 1996 | 2,400 | ? | 36.2 | 40.3 | 12.5 | 3.6 | – | – | – | – | – | | – | – | – | – | 4.1 |
| Tábula V/ABC | 1–10 Feb 1996 | 3,035 | ? | 32.5; 117/125 | 44.1; 176/184 | 12.8; 22/28 | 4.2; 13/14 | – | 0.8; 4/5 | ? 2 | ? 3/4 | ? 1 | | – | ? 2 | – | – | 11.6 |
| Sigma Dos/El Mundo | 6–8 Feb 1996 | 1,000 | ? | 31.5 | 41.8 | 11.9 | 4.2 | – | 1.3 | – | – | – | | – | – | – | – | 10.3 |
| Demoscopia/El País | 3–7 Feb 1996 | 3,500 | 80 | 32.6 | 41.7 | 12.8 | 4.5 | – | 1.3 | – | – | – | | – | – | – | – | 9.1 |
| Opina/La Vanguardia | 5–6 Feb 1996 | 1,185 | 75–80 | 34.0; 135/140 | 40.5; 160/170 | 11.0; 19/21 | 4.5; 13/15 | – | 1.5; 5/6 | – | – | 1.0; 1/2 | | – | – | – | – | 6.5 |
| Tábula V/ABC | 29 Jan–5 Feb 1996 | 4,503 | ? | 28.0– 31.5; 108/123 | 39.0– 41.0; 168/172 | 13.5– 15.0; 24/35 | 4.8– 5.0; 15/17 | – | 1.1; 5/6 | 1.0; 3 | 0.9; 2 | 0.5; 1 | | 0.5; 1 | 0.7; 1 | 0.5; 1 | – | 9.5– 11.0 |
| Vox Pública/El Periódico | 30–31 Jan 1996 | 2,028 | ? | 31.8 | 42.5 | 12.0 | 4.4 | – | – | – | – | – | | – | – | – | – | 10.7 |
| Gallup/El Correo | 11–31 Jan 1996 | 2,010 | 77 | 34.5 | 38.8 | 12.4 | 5.0 | – | 1.3 | – | – | – | | – | – | – | – | 4.3 |
| PP | 25–29 Jan 1996 | 4,551 | 79 | 31.5 | 42.0 | 13.5 | 4.2 | – | 1.0 | – | – | – | | – | – | – | – | 10.5 |
| Tábula V/ABC | 23–26 Jan 1996 | 1,200 | 79 | 30.0; 117/130 | 43.0; 168/181 | 11.0; 22 | 5.5; 18 | – | 1.5; 4 | – | – | – | | – | – | – | – | 13.0 |
| Sigma Dos–Vox Pública/El Mundo | 21–25 Jan 1996 | 11,000 | ? | 31.4; 121/126 | 41.4; 167/174 | 12.6; 25/31 | 4.0; 13 | – | 1.4; 6/7 | 0.6; 2/3 | 0.7; 2 | 0.8; 1 | | 0.4; 1 | 0.6; 1/2 | 0.3; 0 | – | 10.0 |
| Demoscopia/El País | 14 Jan 1996 | 2,500 | 78 | 33.8 | 40.5 | 12.2 | 4.5 | – | 1.1 | – | – | – | – | – | – | – | – | 6.7 |
| CIS | 10–14 Jan 1996 | 2,499 | 78.1 | 33.7 | 40.6 | 11.0 | 4.4 | 0.4 | 1.3 | – | – | – | – | – | – | – | – | 6.9 |
| Sigma Dos/El Mundo | 11–12 Jan 1996 | 1,000 | ? | 30.9; 115/120 | 40.6; 167/174 | 13.0; 27/30 | 4.4; 15/17 | – | 1.3; 5 | – | – | – | – | – | – | – | – | 9.7 |
| Opina/La Vanguardia | 8–9 Jan 1996 | 1,500 | ? | 34.0; 135/145 | 39.5; 155/165 | 10.5; 20/22 | 4.5; 14/16 | – | 1.5; 4/5 | – | – | 1.0; 1 | – | – | – | – | – | 5.5 |
| Gallup/El Correo | 7 Jan 1996 | 2,031 | 77 | 32.7 | 39.0 | 12.9 | 4.6 | – | 0.9 | – | – | – | – | – | – | – | – | 6.3 |
| Sigma Dos–Vox Pública/El Mundo | 3–4 Jan 1996 | 1,000 | ? | 31.2; 115/120 | 40.3; 165/173 | 13.1; 29/30 | 4.6; 16/17 | – | 1.2; 5 | – | – | – | – | – | – | – | – | 9.1 |
| Sigma Dos–Vox Pública/El Mundo | 19–20 Dec 1995 | 1,000 | ? | 31.5; 115/123 | 40.2; 165/173 | 13.6; 29/30 | 4.7; 16/17 | – | 1.2; 5 | – | – | – | – | – | – | – | – | 8.7 |
| Tábula V | 18 Dec 1995 | ? | ? | 25.0 | 41.0 | 16.0 | – | – | – | – | – | – | – | – | – | – | – | 16.0 |
| CIS | 9–14 Dec 1995 | 2,478 | 78.8 | 33.7 | 40.5 | 11.9 | 5.0 | 0.5 | 1.3 | – | – | – | – | – | – | – | – | 6.8 |
| Sigma Dos/El Mundo | 12–13 Dec 1995 | 1,000 | ? | 30.2 | 41.3 | 13.3 | 4.7 | – | 1.2 | – | – | – | – | – | – | – | – | 11.1 |
| Imagen & Opinión/ABC | 21–23 Nov 1995 | 1,000 | ? | 32.7; 127 | 42.4; 172 | 12.8; 25 | 4.5; 14 | – | 1.2; 5 | 0.6; 3 | 0.8; 2 | 0.7; 1 | 0.4; 1 | 0.4; 1 | – | 0.3; 0 | – | 6.8 |
| CIS | 8–13 Nov 1995 | 2,486 | 75.4 | 32.1 | 39.4 | 13.3 | 5.1 | 0.5 | 1.3 | – | – | – | – | – | – | – | – | 7.3 |
| Eco Consulting/Cadena SER | 25 Sep–6 Oct 1995 | 1,870 | ? | 31.0 | 39.6 | 12.3 | 5.1 | – | – | – | – | – | – | – | – | – | – | 8.6 |
| Demoscopia/El País | 30 Sep–2 Oct 1995 | 1,200 | ? | 30.0 | 40.0– 42.0 | – | – | – | – | – | – | – | – | – | – | – | – | 10.0– 12.0 |
| PSOE | 25–30 Sep 1995 | 3,000 | ? | 32.0– 33.0 | 38.0– 39.0 | – | – | – | – | – | – | – | – | – | – | – | – | 6.0 |
| CIS | 13–17 Sep 1995 | 2,493 | 79.0 | 31.9 | 40.2 | 12.7 | 5.2 | 1.3 | 1.3 | – | – | – | – | – | – | – | – | 8.3 |
| Sigma Dos/El Mundo | 13–14 Sep 1995 | 1,000 | ? | 28.3 | 42.0 | 14.1 | 4.7 | – | 1.2 | – | – | – | – | – | – | – | – | 13.7 |
| Sigma Dos/El Mundo | 28 Jul 1995 | ? | ? | 29.3 | 41.7 | 13.5 | 4.6 | – | 1.3 | – | – | – | – | – | – | – | – | 12.4 |
| CIS | 12–17 Jul 1995 | 2,494 | ? | 31.7 | 41.5 | 13.0 | 4.5 | 0.9 | 1.2 | – | – | – | – | – | – | – | – | 9.8 |
| CIS | 25–30 Jun 1995 | 2,484 | ? | 32.3 | 42.2 | 12.0 | 4.4 | 0.8 | 1.2 | – | – | – | – | – | – | – | – | 9.9 |
| CIS | 8–19 Jun 1995 | 6,510 | ? | 31.6 | 41.8 | 13.3 | 5.0 | 0.1 | 1.3 | – | – | – | – | – | – | – | – | 10.2 |
| Sigma Dos/El Mundo | 10 Jun 1995 | ? | ? | 29.4 | 41.2 | 14.0 | 4.6 | – | 1.3 | – | – | – | – | – | – | – | – | 11.8 |
| CIS | 25 May–2 Jun 1995 | 2,492 | ? | 32.0 | 42.6 | 12.3 | 4.4 | 0.5 | 1.3 | – | – | – | – | – | – | – | – | 10.6 |
| 1995 local elections | 28 May 1995 | —N/a | 69.9 | 30.8 | 35.3 | 11.7 | 4.4 | 0.3 | 1.4 | 1.0 | 0.8 | 0.9 | 0.5 | 0.6 | 0.9 | 0.6 | 1.2 | 4.5 |
| Sigma Dos/El Mundo | 9–16 May 1995 | 15,500 | ? | 28.2; 106 | 41.8; 177 | 14.2; 33 | 5.1; 18 | – | ? 5 | – | – | – | – | – | – | – | – | 13.6 |
| Demoscopia/El País | 10–15 May 1995 | 16,700 | ? | 27.0 | 43.0 | 15.0 | 4.7 | – | – | – | – | – | – | – | – | – | – | 16.0 |
| Sigma Dos/El Mundo | 25 Apr–2 May 1995 | ? | ? | 27.8; 99/107 | 42.3; 170/184 | 14.5; 35 | 4.8 ? | – | 1.3 ? | – | – | – | – | – | – | – | – | 14.5 |
| CIS | 19–24 Apr 1995 | 2,497 | ? | 31.7 | 41.6 | 13.0 | 4.7 | 0.8 | 1.3 | – | – | – | – | – | – | – | – | 9.9 |
| CIS | 19–27 Mar 1995 | 2,496 | ? | 32.0 | 40.3 | 14.0 | 4.6 | 0.6 | 1.4 | – | – | – | – | – | – | – | – | 8.3 |
| Demoscopia/El País | 4–7 Mar 1995 | 1,200 | 72 | 30.7 | 38.1 | 15.5 | 4.2 | – | 1.3 | – | – | – | – | – | – | – | – | 7.4 |
| Sigma Dos/El Mundo | 22 Feb–2 Mar 1995 | 16,150 | ? | 28.7; 110 | 41.0; 170 | 14.4; 35 | 5.0; 18 | – | 1.3; 5 | ? 3 | ? 3 | ? 1 | ? 1 | ? 1 | 0.8; 2 | ? 1 | – | 12.3 |
| CIS | 2–9 Feb 1995 | 2,496 | ? | 33.1 | 39.9 | 12.8 | 5.0 | 0.8 | 1.2 | – | – | – | – | – | – | – | – | 6.8 |
| CIS | 20–30 Jan 1995 | 3,991 | ? | 33.3 | 39.6 | 12.4 | 5.5 | 0.9 | 1.3 | – | – | – | – | – | – | – | – | 6.3 |
| Gallup/ABC | 11–27 Jan 1995 | 2,008 | 73 | 30.9 | 39.6 | 13.3 | 5.5 | – | 1.4 | – | – | – | – | – | – | – | – | 8.7 |
| CIS | 12–17 Jan 1995 | 2,496 | ? | 33.0 | 39.4 | 13.6 | 4.9 | 0.9 | 1.3 | – | – | – | – | – | – | – | – | 6.4 |
| Gruppo/ABC | 31 Dec–2 Jan 1995 | 1,000 | ? | 27.0– 29.0; 110/119 | 40.0– 42.0; 162/170 | 16.0– 18.0; 30/34 | 4.5– 4.9; 14/17 | – | – | – | – | – | – | – | – | – | – | 13.0 |
| CIS | 14–19 Dec 1994 | 2,488 | ? | 34.8 | 37.1 | 13.0 | 5.3 | 1.0 | 1.3 | – | – | – | – | – | – | – | – | 2.3 |
| Demoscopia/El País | 11–13 Dec 1994 | 1,200 | 72 | 30.7 | 38.2 | 15.7 | – | – | – | – | – | – | – | – | – | – | – | 7.5 |
| CIS | 30 Nov–11 Dec 1994 | 2,491 | ? | 35.5 | 37.8 | 12.4 | 4.8 | 0.9 | 1.2 | – | – | – | – | – | – | – | – | 2.3 |
| Sigma Dos/El Mundo | 7 Dec 1994 | 2,000 | ? | 28.5 | 40.8 | 16.3 | 4.8 | – | 1.2 | – | – | – | – | – | – | – | – | 12.3 |
| Tábula V/ABC | 28 Nov–2 Dec 1994 | 4,542 | ? | 24.0 | 40.0 | 19.0 | – | – | – | – | – | – | – | – | – | – | – | 16.0 |
| CIS | 10–23 Nov 1994 | 2,493 | ? | 35.1 | 37.2 | 12.9 | 5.0 | 0.8 | 1.3 | – | – | – | – | – | – | – | – | 2.1 |
| OTR–IS/El Periódico | 7–16 Nov 1994 | ? | ? | 28.2 | 41.3 | 15.2 | 4.9 | – | 1.2 | – | – | – | – | – | – | – | – | 13.1 |
| CIS | 19–24 Oct 1994 | 2,494 | ? | 35.3 | 37.4 | 12.1 | 5.0 | 1.1 | 1.5 | – | – | – | – | – | – | – | – | 2.1 |
| Gruppo/ABC | 5–6 Oct 1994 | 1,000 | ? | 31.0– 32.0 | 40.0– 41.0 | 14.0– 15.0 | 4.0– 5.0 | – | – | – | – | – | – | – | – | – | – | 9.0 |
| Opina/La Vanguardia | 29 Sep–1 Oct 1994 | 2,000 | ? | 35.0 | 37.0 | 15.0 | 5.0 | – | 1.5 | – | – | – | – | – | – | – | – | 2.0 |
| OTR–IS/El Periódico | 26–30 Sep 1994 | 1,204 | ? | 29.8 | 39.6 | 14.7 | 4.9 | – | 1.4 | – | – | – | – | – | – | – | – | 9.8 |
| Sigma Dos/El Mundo | 1 Sep 1994 | ? | ? | 29.6 | 41.2 | 14.3 | 4.9 | – | 1.5 | – | – | – | – | – | – | – | – | 11.6 |
| OTR–IS/El Periódico | 27 Jun–13 Jul 1994 | 1,200 | ? | 28.4 | 41.6 | 14.7 | 5.1 | – | 1.2 | – | – | – | – | – | – | – | – | 13.2 |
| CIS | 1–5 Jul 1994 | 2,492 | 78.8 | 31.1 | 40.2 | 11.7 | 4.5 | 0.6 | 1.3 | – | – | – | – | – | – | – | – | 9.1 |
| 1994 EP election | 12 Jun 1994 | —N/a | 59.1 | 30.8 (116) | 40.1 (169) | 13.4 (30) | 4.3 (19) | 1.0 (0) | 1.3 (5) | 0.6 (3) | 0.9 (3) | 0.8 (1) | 0.2 (0) | 0.5 (1) | 0.7 (2) | 0.6 (1) | 0.7 (0) | 9.3 |
| Sigma Dos–Vox Pública/Antena 3 | 3–4 Jun 1994 | ? | ? | 30.6 | 40.2 | 13.7 | – | – | – | – | – | – | – | – | – | – | – | 9.6 |
| Vox Pública/El Periódico | 31 May–2 Jun 1994 | 1,303 | 61.8 | 30.5 | 40.7 | 15.2 | 4.1 | 1.3 | – | – | – | – | – | – | – | – | – | 10.2 |
| Opina/La Vanguardia | 30 May–1 Jun 1994 | 2,000 | ? | 34.0 | 39.0 | 14.0 | 5.0 | 1.0 | 1.5 | – | 0.5 | – | – | – | – | – | – | 5.0 |
| Sigma Dos/El Mundo | 14 May 1994 | ? | ? | 32.8 | 37.6 | 13.5 | 4.9 | – | – | – | – | – | – | – | – | – | – | 4.8 |
| Opina/La Vanguardia | 8–11 Apr 1994 | 2,000 | ? | 36.0 | 38.0 | 12.0 | 5.0 | 1.0 | 1.5 | – | 0.5 | – | – | – | – | – | – | 2.0 |
| OTR–IS/El Periódico | 28 Mar–3 Apr 1994 | ? | ? | 34.5 | 37.8 | 11.6 | – | – | – | – | – | – | – | – | – | – | – | 3.3 |
| Sigma Dos/El Mundo | 23–24 Mar 1994 | 1,000 | ? | 34.4 | 37.7 | 11.2 | 4.5 | – | – | – | – | – | – | – | – | – | – | 3.3 |
| Gallup/ABC | 10 Jan–28 Feb 1994 | 4,010 | 68.7 | 32.4 | 39.1 | 10.8 | 5.3 | – | 1.8 | – | – | – | – | – | – | – | – | 6.7 |
| Iope–Etmar/Tele 5 | 19 Jan 1994 | ? | ? | 31.0 | 36.2 | 11.0 | 5.7 | – | 1.5 | – | – | – | – | – | – | – | – | 5.2 |
| Gallup/ABC | 19–29 Dec 1993 | 1,008 | 70.0 | 33.8 | 38.6 | 10.4 | 5.1 | – | 1.6 | – | – | – | – | – | – | – | – | 4.8 |
| Sigma Dos/El Mundo | 26 Dec 1993 | ? | ? | 36.0 | 36.5 | 11.6 | 4.8 | 0.6 | 1.3 | – | 0.9 | – | – | – | – | – | – | 0.5 |
| 1993 general election | 6 Jun 1993 | —N/a | 76.4 | 38.8; 159 | 34.8; 141 | 9.6; 18 | 4.9; 17 | 1.8; 0 | 1.2; 5 | 0.9; 4 | 0.9; 2 | 0.8; 1 | 0.6; 1 | 0.5; 1 | 0.5; 0 | 0.5; 1 | 0.4; 0 | 4.0 |

==== Voting preferences ====
The table below lists raw, unweighted voting preferences.

Color key:

Poll conducted after legal ban on opinion polls

| Polling firm/Commissioner | Fieldwork date | Sample size | PSOE | PP | IU | CiU | CDS | PNV | CC | HB | LV | Question | X mark | Lead |
|---|---|---|---|---|---|---|---|---|---|---|---|---|---|---|
| 1996 general election (Note: Does not include non-resident citizens.) | 3 Mar 1996 | —N/a | 29.1 | 30.2 | 8.2 | 3.6 | 0.1 | 1.0 | 0.7 | 0.6 | 0.2 | —N/a | 21.9 | 1.1 |
| CIS | 27 Feb–1 Mar 1996 | 2,491 | 26.7 | 23.9 | 9.5 | 3.1 | – | 0.7 | 0.2 | 0.5 | 0.6 | 24.7 | 5.4 | 2.8 |
| CIS | 12–21 Feb 1996 | 6,642 | 24.2 | 25.6 | 9.3 | 3.6 | – | 0.8 | 0.3 | 0.4 | 0.7 | 24.1 | 6.6 | 1.4 |
| ASEP | 17 Feb 1996 | 1,215 | 26.0 | 22.4 | 10.0 | 4.6* | 0.4 | * | 0.2 | 1.5** | 0.7 | 25.2 | 6.3 | 3.6 |
| Vox Pública/El Periódico | 11–16 Feb 1996 | 12,069 | 21.2 | 30.4 | 7.4 | 3.0 | – | 0.8 | 0.5 | 0.5 | – | 31.1 | | 9.2 |
| ASEP | 15–20 Jan 1996 | 1,216 | 24.5 | 25.1 | 10.0 | 4.5* | 0.3 | * | 0.4 | 1.3** | 1.0 | 21.9 | 7.7 | 0.6 |
| CIS | 10–14 Jan 1996 | 2,499 | 24.2 | 25.8 | 8.5 | 2.9 | 0.4 | 1.0 | 0.7 | 0.4 | – | 22.8 | 7.3 | 1.6 |
| CIS | 9–14 Dec 1995 | 2,478 | 24.4 | 25.4 | 10.1 | 2.7 | 0.6 | 0.6 | 0.2 | 0.4 | – | 22.3 | 7.6 | 1.0 |
| ASEP | 11–16 Dec 1995 | 1,214 | 22.5 | 25.2 | 11.4 | 3.9* | 0.4 | * | 0.4 | 1.1** | 1.6 | 22.2 | 9.3 | 2.7 |
| ASEP | 13–18 Nov 1995 | 1,214 | 22.4 | 23.4 | 10.6 | 4.0* | 0.3 | * | 0.4 | 1.7** | 1.7 | 22.8 | 9.9 | 1.0 |
| CIS | 8–13 Nov 1995 | 2,486 | 20.6 | 21.3 | 10.1 | 3.4 | 0.7 | 0.9 | 0.2 | 0.4 | – | 26.8 | 8.2 | 0.7 |
| CIS | 17–22 Oct 1995 | 2,493 | 21.0 | 24.1 | 11.1 | 3.3 | 0.4 | 0.6 | 0.5 | 0.3 | – | 24.6 | 8.3 | 3.1 |
| ASEP | 16–21 Oct 1995 | 1,210 | 19.0 | 22.0 | 11.8 | 6.0* | 0.3 | * | 0.6 | 2.1** | 1.2 | 24.2 | 11.3 | 3.0 |
| Demoscopia/El País | 30 Sep–2 Oct 1995 | 1,200 | 16.4 | 22.8 | 9.4 | 2.8 | – | – | – | – | – | 38.2 | | 6.4 |
| ASEP | 18–23 Sep 1995 | 1,217 | 19.8 | 24.2 | 9.3 | 5.6* | 0.2 | * | 0.6 | 1.3** | 2.2 | 23.5 | 11.4 | 4.4 |
| CIS | 13–17 Sep 1995 | 2,493 | 20.0 | 23.2 | 10.3 | 3.3 | 0.3 | 0.7 | 0.3 | 0.4 | – | 27.7 | 8.7 | 3.2 |
| CIS | 12–17 Jul 1995 | 2,494 | 22.0 | 24.7 | 10.8 | 2.4 | 0.8 | 0.6 | 0.7 | 0.4 | – | 25.2 | 7.0 | 2.7 |
| Demoscopia/El País | 9 Jul 1995 | ? | 14.7 | 26.8 | – | – | – | – | – | – | – | – | – | 12.1 |
| ASEP | 3–8 Jul 1995 | 1,209 | 23.0 | 29.5 | 12.3 | 5.8* | 1.2 | * | 0.4 | 1.8** | 1.6 | 15.5 | 6.4 | 6.5 |
| CIS | 25–30 Jun 1995 | 2,484 | 19.8 | 27.5 | 10.3 | 2.9 | 0.8 | 0.8 | 0.4 | 0.4 | – | 24.8 | 6.6 | 7.7 |
| CIS | 8–19 Jun 1995 | 6,510 | 22.7 | 27.6 | 11.0 | 3.4 | 0.3 | 0.9 | 0.5 | 0.5 | – | 23.5 | 5.7 | 4.9 |
| ASEP | 5–10 Jun 1995 | 1,221 | 21.7 | 26.1 | 11.4 | 7.5* | 0.2 | * | 0.7 | 2.5** | 1.4 | 19.9 | 6.6 | 4.4 |
| CIS | 25 May–2 Jun 1995 | 2,492 | 21.6 | 27.1 | 10.4 | 3.2 | 0.4 | 0.8 | 0.5 | 0.4 | – | 23.7 | 6.8 | 5.5 |
| ASEP | 8–13 May 1995 | 1,213 | 23.6 | 23.7 | 10.6 | 3.7* | 0.8 | * | 0.1 | 1.8** | 1.6 | 23.4 | 8.4 | 0.1 |
| CIS | 19–24 Apr 1995 | 2,497 | 19.0 | 25.4 | 11.6 | 2.7 | 0.7 | 0.9 | 0.3 | 0.1 | – | 24.6 | 9.1 | 6.4 |
| Demoscopia/El País | 21 Apr 1995 | ? | 14.3 | 33.3 | – | – | – | – | – | – | – | – | – | 19.0 |
| CIS | 4–18 Apr 1995 | 4,000 | 19.7 | 21.7 | 10.1 | 3.2 | 1.3 | 1.0 | 0.3 | 0.4 | – | 29.1 | 7.8 | 2.0 |
| ASEP | 3–8 Apr 1995 | 1,213 | 22.2 | 22.9 | 12.2 | 5.4* | 1.0 | * | 0.4 | 1.2** | 1.4 | 19.9 | 10.7 | 0.7 |
| CIS | 19–27 Mar 1995 | 2,496 | 21.1 | 24.9 | 12.3 | 2.8 | 0.5 | 1.2 | 0.3 | 0.3 | – | 22.2 | 8.7 | 3.8 |
| ASEP | 6–11 Mar 1995 | 1,219 | 20.9 | 23.9 | 14.3 | 4.3* | 1.1 | * | 0.2 | 1.3** | 2.3 | 19.7 | 9.3 | 3.0 |
| CIS | 8–9 Mar 1995 | 1,117 | 15.1 | 23.0 | 12.9 | 4.3 | 1.4 | 1.2 | 0.8 | 0.6 | – | 18.6 | 8.2 | 7.9 |
| Demoscopia/El País | 4–7 Mar 1995 | 1,200 | 19.6 | 26.5 | – | – | – | – | – | – | – | – | – | 6.9 |
| CIS | 2–13 Feb 1995 | 2,500 | 22.4 | 20.4 | 10.6 | 3.2 | 0.8 | 0.9 | 0.3 | 0.4 | – | 24.9 | 10.2 | 2.0 |
| CIS | 9–11 Feb 1995 | 1,200 | 19.2 | 23.5 | 11.7 | 3.0 | – | 0.4 | 0.1 | 0.3 | 0.6 | 25.6 | 9.9 | 4.3 |
| ASEP | 6–11 Feb 1995 | 1,211 | 21.1 | 22.0 | 15.6 | 4.6* | 1.5 | * | 0.2 | 1.1** | 1.4 | 20.6 | 8.8 | 0.9 |
| CIS | 2–9 Feb 1995 | 2,496 | 21.0 | 21.9 | 10.4 | 3.3 | 0.5 | 0.8 | 0.4 | 0.2 | – | 26.9 | 8.8 | 0.9 |
| CIS | 20–30 Jan 1995 | 3,991 | 17.0 | 19.8 | 9.3 | 3.2 | 0.5 | 0.8 | 0.3 | 0.4 | – | 33.2 | 10.9 | 2.8 |
| CIS | 12–17 Jan 1995 | 2,496 | 23.2 | 21.6 | 11.4 | 3.4 | 0.7 | 1.2 | 0.3 | 0.5 | – | 23.5 | 9.2 | 1.6 |
| ASEP | 9–14 Jan 1995 | 1,215 | 20.8 | 20.2 | 13.3 | 4.3* | 1.0 | * | 0.2 | 2.3** | 1.3 | 22.2 | 12.3 | 0.6 |
| CIS | 14–19 Dec 1994 | 2,488 | 18.9 | 19.5 | 11.8 | 3.3 | 0.6 | 0.9 | 0.4 | 0.2 | – | 29.4 | 10.0 | 0.6 |
| CIS | 30 Nov–11 Dec 1994 | 2,491 | 22.2 | 22.7 | 10.3 | 3.1 | 0.4 | 0.7 | 0.3 | 0.6 | – | 25.2 | 9.4 | 0.5 |
| ASEP | 5–10 Dec 1994 | 1,210 | 27.0 | 20.2 | 10.8 | 4.4* | 0.5 | * | 0.2 | 1.8** | 1.8 | 19.9 | 11.5 | 6.8 |
| CIS | 19–24 Nov 1994 | 2,481 | 19.3 | 15.4 | 8.6 | 2.5 | 0.7 | 0.8 | 0.2 | 0.2 | – | 32.0 | 14.1 | 3.9 |
| CIS | 10–23 Nov 1994 | 2,493 | 21.5 | 20.9 | 9.9 | 3.1 | 0.5 | 0.5 | 0.4 | 0.2 | – | 26.0 | 11.0 | 0.6 |
| ASEP | 7–12 Nov 1994 | 1,210 | 21.0 | 22.0 | 13.2 | 4.8* | 0.8 | * | 0.4 | 0.8** | 1.2 | 19.0 | 12.8 | 1.0 |
| CIS | 19–24 Oct 1994 | 2,494 | 19.6 | 20.0 | 9.1 | 3.3 | 0.6 | 0.8 | 0.3 | 0.4 | – | 28.6 | 11.3 | 0.4 |
| ASEP | 10–15 Oct 1994 | 1,212 | 20.6 | 21.2 | 12.1 | 5.1* | 0.8 | * | 0.6 | 2.1** | 2.0 | 21.6 | 11.3 | 0.6 |
| Demoscopia/El País | 2 Oct 1994 | ? | 20.2 | 20.0 | 8.1 | – | – | – | – | – | – | 39.8 | | 0.2 |
| CIS | 20–26 Sep 1994 | 2,491 | 21.9 | 20.9 | 11.8 | 3.8 | 0.5 | 1.2 | 0.4 | 0.4 | – | 24.0 | 10.1 | 1.0 |
| ASEP | 12–17 Sep 1994 | 1,212 | 21.3 | 22.7 | 12.3 | 4.4* | 1.1 | * | 0.2 | 1.5** | 1.5 | 20.8 | 11.9 | 1.4 |
| CIS | 5–14 Sep 1994 | 2,494 | 18.8 | 20.4 | 9.6 | 2.9 | 0.8 | 0.5 | 0.8 | 0.4 | – | 31.7 | 10.9 | 1.6 |
| ASEP | 11–16 Jul 1994 | 1,208 | 21.0 | 22.9 | 14.2 | 6.5* | 1.0 | * | 0.4 | 1.6** | 1.8 | 18.8 | 10.2 | 1.9 |
| CIS | 30 Jun–7 Jul 1994 | 2,492 | 20.4 | 26.2 | 12.4 | 3.4 | 0.4 | 1.1 | 0.4 | 0.4 | – | 20.7 | 9.5 | 5.8 |
| Demoscopia/El País | 3 Jul 1994 | ? | 20.1 | 25.7 | 13.3 | – | – | – | – | – | – | 28.6 | | 5.6 |
| ASEP | 13–18 Jun 1994 | 1,221 | 20.3 | 25.6 | 13.1 | 5.6* | 1.4 | * | 0.8 | 2.1** | 1.6 | 20.5 | 7.1 | 5.3 |
| 1994 EP election | 12 Jun 1994 | —N/a | 18.2 | 23.9 | 8.0 | 2.6 | 0.6 | 0.8 | 0.4 | 0.5 | 0.3 | —N/a | 40.4 | 5.7 |
| CIS | 21–26 May 1994 | 2,500 | 21.7 | 25.5 | 10.2 | 3.7 | 0.5 | 0.6 | 0.3 | 0.5 | – | 24.3 | 8.5 | 3.8 |
| ASEP | 16–21 May 1994 | 1,223 | 22.1 | 19.0 | 13.1 | 5.7* | 1.6 | * | 0.3 | 1.9** | 2.2 | 21.0 | 10.3 | 3.1 |
| CIS | 12–16 May 1994 | 2,500 | 19.3 | 23.1 | 12.5 | 3.3 | 0.6 | 0.9 | 0.3 | 0.6 | – | 24.6 | 11.1 | 3.8 |
| CIS | 7–9 May 1994 | 1,200 | 16.8 | 20.3 | 8.2 | 2.6 | 0.4 | 0.2 | 0.1 | 0.5 | – | 31.9 | 9.0 | 3.5 |
| CIS | 18 Apr–2 May 1994 | 2,482 | 19.0 | 25.1 | 10.9 | 4.1 | 0.8 | 0.8 | 0.5 | 0.7 | – | 24.3 | 9.3 | 6.1 |
| ASEP | 18–22 Apr 1994 | 1,222 | 19.3 | 22.6 | 12.4 | 5.2* | 0.6 | * | 0.5 | 1.9** | 2.1 | 20.9 | 12.7 | 3.3 |
| CIS | 6–11 Apr 1994 | 2,487 | 18.1 | 19.1 | 8.9 | 2.8 | 0.5 | 0.5 | 0.5 | 0.2 | – | 30.9 | 14.0 | 1.0 |
| CIS | 18–30 Mar 1994 | 2,501 | 18.4 | 18.2 | 8.8 | 2.9 | 0.5 | 0.4 | 0.3 | 0.5 | – | 37.1 | 9.5 | 0.2 |
| Demoscopia/El País | 27 Mar 1994 | ? | 17.2 | 22.0 | 9.2 | 2.7 | – | 1.3 | – | – | – | – | – | 4.8 |
| ASEP | 14–19 Mar 1994 | 1,216 | 21.0 | 21.2 | 10.0 | 4.4* | 1.3 | * | 0.5 | 1.6** | 2.1 | 24.9 | 10.5 | 0.2 |
| CIS | 22 Feb–3 Mar 1994 | 2,499 | 19.3 | 21.1 | 7.7 | 3.4 | 0.7 | 0.8 | 0.3 | 0.4 | – | 31.4 | 11.2 | 1.8 |
| ASEP | 14–19 Feb 1994 | 1,219 | 18.8 | 23.3 | 12.4 | 5.3* | 1.2 | * | 0.4 | 1.7** | 2.1 | 19.8 | 12.3 | 4.5 |
| CIS | 8–14 Feb 1994 | 2,500 | 16.2 | 17.2 | 9.9 | 2.9 | 1.0 | 0.6 | 0.3 | 0.2 | – | 35.5 | 11.9 | 1.0 |
| CIS | 18–24 Jan 1994 | 2,500 | 18.7 | 18.9 | 8.3 | 3.4 | 0.4 | 0.8 | 0.5 | 0.5 | – | 35.0 | 9.9 | 0.2 |
| ASEP | 17–21 Jan 1994 | 1,223 | 21.3 | 20.8 | 10.5 | 4.4* | 1.4 | * | 0.8 | 2.3** | 2.3 | 20.6 | 12.3 | 0.5 |
| CIS | 12–18 Jan 1994 | 2,500 | 21.6 | 20.2 | 7.6 | 3.2 | 0.4 | 0.7 | 0.3 | 0.4 | – | 32.4 | 9.8 | 1.4 |
| CIS | 16–21 Dec 1993 | 2,500 | 18.5 | 18.7 | 8.0 | 2.8 | 0.8 | 0.6 | 0.4 | 0.4 | – | 34.9 | 10.6 | 0.2 |
| Demoscopia/El País | 19 Dec 1993 | ? | 20.8 | 22.6 | 7.4 | 2.9 | – | – | – | – | – | 37.1 | | 1.8 |
| ASEP | 7–11 Dec 1993 | 1,220 | 21.8 | 23.2 | 9.4 | 4.4* | 1.1 | * | 0.3 | 1.8** | 1.5 | 22.8 | 10.2 | 1.4 |
| CIS | 26 Nov–1 Dec 1993 | 2,501 | 19.3 | 17.5 | 8.3 | 4.1 | 0.6 | 1.2 | 0.4 | 0.2 | – | 33.7 | 11.4 | 1.8 |
| CIS | 13–30 Nov 1993 | 2,500 | 22.1 | 15.9 | 7.6 | 3.3 | 1.0 | 0.8 | 0.6 | 0.4 | – | 33.9 | 11.3 | 6.2 |
| ASEP | 8–13 Nov 1993 | 1,217 | 21.7 | 21.3 | 9.7 | 5.5* | 1.3 | * | 0.1 | 1.5** | 2.0 | 22.9 | 11.5 | 0.4 |
| CIS | 19–26 Oct 1993 | 3,998 | 20.3 | 15.8 | 6.5 | 3.6 | 0.7 | 0.6 | 0.4 | 0.3 | – | 37.2 | 11.3 | 4.5 |
| Demoscopia/El País | 24 Oct 1993 | ? | 28.3 | 23.9 | 9.9 | 3.9 | – | – | – | – | – | 28.5 | | 4.4 |
| CIS | 13–19 Oct 1993 | 2,499 | 23.7 | 18.7 | 8.2 | 3.8 | 1.1 | 1.0 | 0.3 | 0.5 | – | 30.3 | 8.5 | 5.0 |
| ASEP | 11–16 Oct 1993 | 1,222 | 23.6 | 21.2 | 10.4 | 6.7* | 1.3 | * | 0.5 | 1.5** | 2.7 | 19.0 | 10.8 | 2.4 |
| CIS | 21–27 Sep 1993 | 2,496 | 26.5 | 16.6 | 9.8 | 3.0 | 0.6 | 0.9 | 0.4 | 0.3 | – | 30.0 | 8.5 | 9.9 |
| ASEP | 13–18 Sep 1993 | 1,215 | 23.7 | 19.4 | 10.2 | 5.3* | 0.9 | * | 0.7 | 2.1** | 2.3 | 22.5 | 10.2 | 4.3 |
| CIS | 19–30 Jul 1993 | 2,485 | 31.6 | 17.3 | 8.1 | 3.6 | 0.8 | 0.6 | 0.6 | 0.8 | – | 26.0 | 7.2 | 14.3 |
| Demoscopia/El País | 16–20 Jul 1993 | 1,200 | 33.1 | 24.4 | 8.6 | – | – | – | – | – | – | 22.2 | | 8.7 |
| ASEP | 12–17 Jul 1993 | 1,207 | 29.2 | 22.9 | 13.4 | 5.0* | 1.7 | * | 0.5 | 1.2** | 1.3 | 16.1 | 6.7 | 6.3 |
| CIS | 10–15 Jul 1993 | 2,500 | 28.8 | 16.5 | 8.1 | 3.4 | 1.0 | 0.6 | 0.5 | 0.6 | – | 29.5 | 7.9 | 12.3 |
| CIS | 25 Jun–3 Jul 1993 | 2,500 | 29.5 | 20.5 | 8.0 | 3.8 | 1.2 | 0.6 | 0.8 | 0.4 | – | 23.7 | 8.9 | 9.0 |
| ASEP | 14–19 Jun 1993 | 1,219 | 34.0 | 21.3 | 9.9 | 5.9* | 1.9 | * | 0.7 | 1.4** | 1.5 | 17.2 | 3.9 | 12.7 |
| 1996 general election | 3 Mar 1996 | —N/a | 29.6 | 26.7 | 7.3 | 3.8 | 1.3 | 0.9 | 0.7 | 0.7 | 0.6 | —N/a | 23.1 | 2.9 |
(*) Includes data for CiU, PNV, CG, PRC, PAR, UPN, PA, UV and EU. (**) Includes data for HB, ERC and BNG.

==== Victory preference ====
The table below lists opinion polling on the victory preferences for each party in the event of a general election taking place.

Color key:

Poll conducted after legal ban on opinion polls

| Polling firm/Commissioner | Fieldwork date | Sample size | PSOE | PP | IU | Other/ None | Question | Lead |
|---|---|---|---|---|---|---|---|---|
| CIS | 27 Feb–1 Mar 1996 | 2,491 | 35.8 | 38.3 | – | 13.0 | 13.0 | 2.5 |
| CIS | 12–21 Feb 1996 | 6,642 | 36.7 | 37.1 | – | 12.8 | 13.4 | 0.4 |
| CIS | 10–14 Jan 1996 | 2,499 | 31.6 | 38.0 | – | 16.2 | 14.2 | 6.4 |
| Opina/La Vanguardia | 8–9 Jan 1996 | 1,500 | 30.4 | 32.5 | – | – | 37.1 | 2.1 |
| CIS | 9–14 Dec 1995 | 2,478 | 31.6 | 37.3 | – | 17.2 | 13.9 | 5.7 |
| CIS | 17–22 Oct 1995 | 2,493 | 29.7 | 33.7 | – | 15.6 | 20.9 | 4.0 |
| CIS | 19–27 Mar 1995 | 2,496 | 26.3 | 38.6 | – | 15.6 | 19.5 | 12.3 |
| CIS | 8–9 Mar 1995 | 1,117 | 36.9 | 45.6 | – | 9.9 | 7.4 | 8.7 |
| CIS | 9–11 Feb 1995 | 1,200 | 38.3 | 40.4 | – | 10.3 | 11.1 | 2.1 |
| CIS | 2–9 Feb 1995 | 2,496 | 31.6 | 33.7 | – | 18.9 | 15.7 | 2.1 |
| CIS | 30 Nov–11 Dec 1994 | 2,491 | 31.5 | 34.6 | – | 15.2 | 18.7 | 3.1 |
| CIS | 20–26 Sep 1994 | 2,491 | 28.9 | 33.6 | – | 20.2 | 17.3 | 4.7 |
| Opina/La Vanguardia | 30 May–1 Jun 1994 | 2,000 | 20.3 | 30.3 | 7.7 | 7.6 | 34.1 | 10.0 |
| Opina/La Vanguardia | 8–11 Apr 1994 | 2,000 | 16.2 | 20.6 | 4.9 | 5.6 | 52.7 | 4.4 |

==== Victory likelihood ====
The table below lists opinion polling on the perceived likelihood of victory for each party in the event of a general election taking place.

Color key:

Poll conducted after legal ban on opinion polls

| Polling firm/Commissioner | Fieldwork date | Sample size | PSOE | PP | IU | Other/ None | Question | Lead |
|---|---|---|---|---|---|---|---|---|
| CIS | 27 Feb–1 Mar 1996 | 2,491 | 9.6 | 60.5 | – | 14.0 | 16.0 | 50.9 |
| CIS | 12–21 Feb 1996 | 6,642 | 13.2 | 56.7 | – | 13.5 | 16.6 | 43.5 |
| ASEP | 17 Feb 1996 | 1,215 | 15.9 | 64.2 | 0.2 | 0.2 | 19.5 | 48.3 |
| ASEP | 15–20 Jan 1996 | 1,216 | 22.9 | 58.7 | 0.1 | 0.2 | 18.0 | 35.8 |
| Demoscopia/El País | 14 Jan 1996 | 2,500 | 22.0 | 60.0 | – | 18.0 | | 38.0 |
| Opina/La Vanguardia | 8–9 Jan 1996 | 1,500 | 21.2 | 49.9 | – | – | 28.9 | 28.7 |
| ASEP | 11–16 Dec 1995 | 1,214 | 21.2 | 54.0 | 1.8 | 1.4 | 21.6 | 32.8 |
| CIS | 17–22 Oct 1995 | 2,493 | 13.0 | 54.8 | – | 7.7 | 24.4 | 41.8 |
| CIS | 19–27 Mar 1995 | 2,496 | 19.9 | 44.2 | – | 13.3 | 22.7 | 24.3 |
| Demoscopia/El País | 4–7 Mar 1995 | 1,200 | 23.0 | 54.0 | – | 23.0 | | 31.0 |
| CIS | 12–17 Jan 1995 | 2,496 | 21.4 | 40.6 | – | 17.5 | 20.5 | 19.2 |
| Demoscopia/El País | 11–13 Dec 1994 | 1,200 | 30.0 | 45.0 | – | 25.0 | | 15.0 |
| Opina/La Vanguardia | 30 May–1 Jun 1994 | 2,000 | 28.5 | 28.5 | 0.5 | 0.9 | 41.7 | Tie |
| Opina/La Vanguardia | 8–11 Apr 1994 | 2,000 | 24.2 | 18.8 | 0.4 | 1.3 | 55.2 | 5.4 |

=== Sub-national polling ===
==== Catalonia ====
| Polling firm/Commissioner | Fieldwork date | Sample size | Turnout | PSC | CiU | PP | IC | ERC | Lead |
|---|---|---|---|---|---|---|---|---|---|
| 1996 general election | 3 Mar 1996 | —N/a | 75.4 | 39.4; 19 | 29.6; 16 | 18.0; 8 | 7.6; 2 | 4.2; 1 | 9.8 |
| Opina/La Vanguardia | 19–20 Feb 1996 | 1,000 | ? | 33.0; 15/17 | 31.0; 14/15 | 22.0; 10/12 | 6.5; 2/3 | 6.0; 1/2 | 2.0 |
| Opina/La Vanguardia | 5–6 Feb 1996 | 800 | ? | 31.0; 14/16 | 31.0; 13/15 | 24.0; 12/14 | 6.0; 2/3 | 6.0; 1/2 | Tie |
| 1994 EP election | 12 Jun 1994 | —N/a | 51.9 | 28.2 (14) | 31.5 (19) | 18.5 (9) | 11.1 (4) | 5.5 (1) | 3.3 |
| 1993 general election | 6 Jun 1993 | —N/a | 75.4 | 34.9; 18 | 31.8; 17 | 17.0; 8 | 7.5; 3 | 5.1; 1 | 3.1 |
