= Black budget =

Government funding for espionage and other covert operations

A black budget or covert appropriation is a government budget that is allocated for classified or other secret operations of a state. The black budget is an account of expenses and spending related to military research and covert operations. The black budget is mostly classified because of security reasons.

A black budget can be complicated to calculate, but in the United States it has been estimated to be over US$50 billion a year, taking up approximately 7 percent of the US$700 billion military budget.

== By country ==
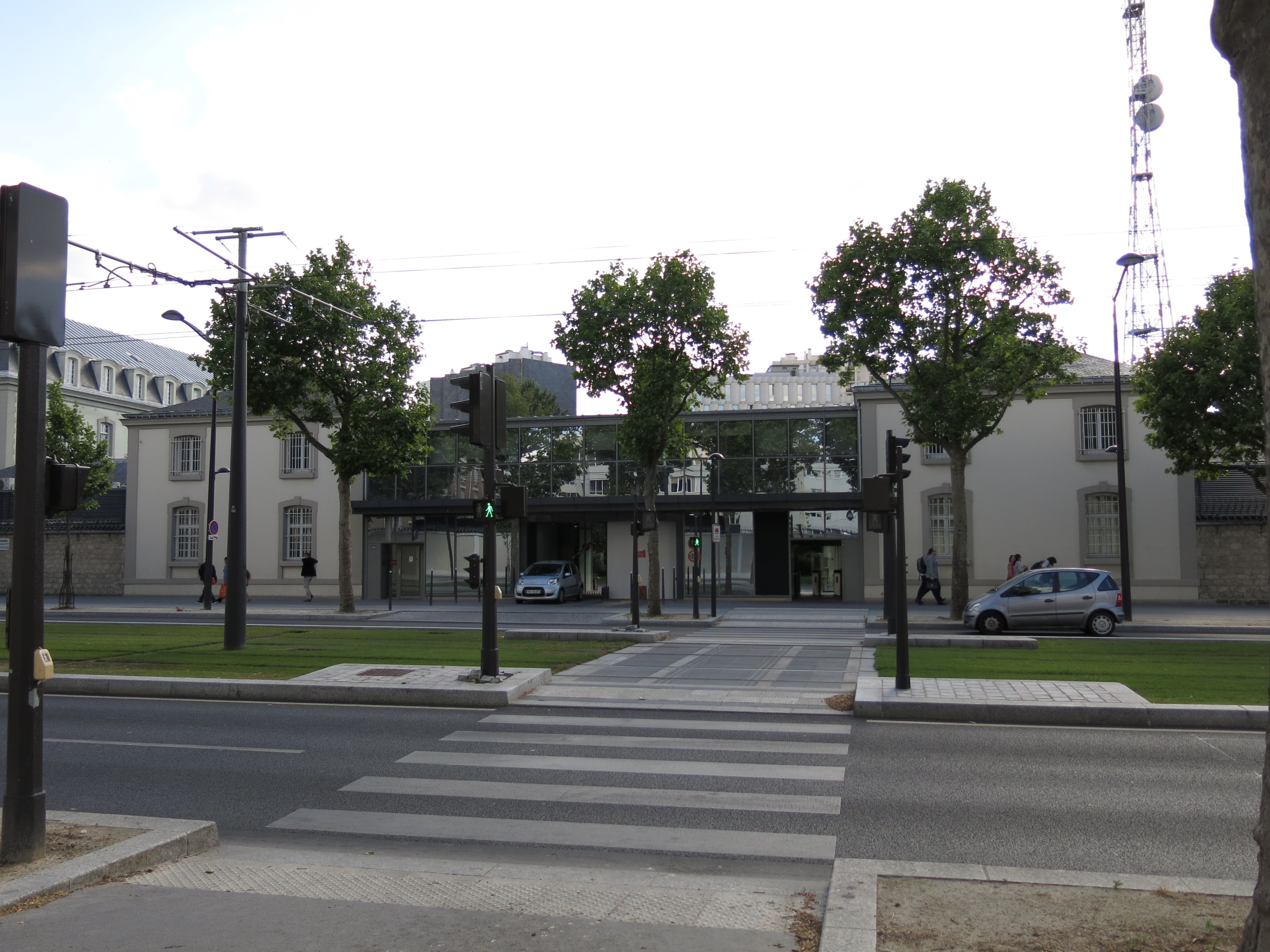
Boulevard Mortier, 141 with the left surface building of the headquarters of the French secret services DGSE taken

=== Philippines ===
The black budget are known in the Philippines as confidential and intelligence funds (CIFs). It refers to budgetary allocations disbursed to government agencies, including civilian offices and security institutions, for activities related to national security, surveillance, and intelligence-gathering. These funds are exempt from standard auditing procedures due to the sensitive nature of the operations they support.

The use of CIFs is authorised under the General Appropriations Act (GAA) passed annually by the Congress of the Philippines. The Department of Budget and Management, the Department of Interior and Local Government, the Department of National Defense, the Governance Commission for GOCCs and the Commission on Audit further outlines their usage through Joint Circular No. 2015-01, which classify such funds into two categories:

- Confidential funds: Allocated to civilian government agencies for activities involving surveillance, law enforcement, and security operations.
- Intelligence funds: Typically allocated to military and law enforcement agencies for intelligence-related activities both domestic and foreign in scope.

These funds are subject to guidelines issued by the Commission on Audit (COA), but their oversight remains limited compared to other public expenditures due to the need for confidentiality.

While the COA retains the authority to audit CIFs, actual documentation is often redacted or classified, and auditing is conducted with discretion. Reports are submitted to select congressional oversight bodies, such as the Joint Congressional Oversight Committee on Intelligence and Confidential Funds, Programmes and Activities.

In recent years, civil society groups, media organisations, and watchdogs have raised concerns over the growing use of CIFs, particularly in civilian offices such as the Office of the President of the Philippines and the Office of the Vice President of the Philippines. Critics argue that the opacity of these funds renders them vulnerable to misuse and corruption, with limited avenues for public scrutiny. In 2025, the Philippine Supreme Court upheld the conviction of a city mayor for corruption in relation to confidential and intelligence funds.

The allocation of substantial CIFs to non-security agencies has sparked public debate. In particular, the allocation of confidential funds to top executive officials, including the President and Vice President, has been criticised as lacking transparency. Calls have been made for stricter guidelines, greater congressional oversight, and an independent audit mechanism to ensure the proper utilisation of taxpayer funds. One notable occurrence was in the controversial use of CIFs by Vice President Sara Duterte from 2022 to 2023, which led to her impeachment in 2025 and 2026.

Legislative proposals have since been introduced to either restrict the use of CIFs or mandate clearer guidelines for their use, especially for agencies without direct mandates for national security or law enforcement. Progressive organizations have called for the total abolition of confidential funds, stating that funds should instead be spent on building classrooms and other forms of public service.

=== Russia ===
According to an estimate by the Moscow-based Gaidar Institute, about 21% (3.2 trillion rubles) of the Russian federal budget was "black" (not itemized) in 2015. This represents a doubling from 2010. The increase coincided with huge increases in the Russian military budget under Russian President Vladimir Putin.

=== Spain ===
In Spain, the black budget is known as "reserved funds" (Spanish: fondos reservados), "secret funds", or "reserved expenditures". These funds are a classified budgetary allocation within the General State Budget of Spain used to finance activities related to state security and national defence. They are primarily intended for intelligence work, counter-terrorism operations and the fight against organised crime, particularly drug trafficking. The defining feature of these funds is their legally protected secrecy. Their use is exempt from normal public accounting procedures, meaning that details of spending are not publicly disclosed and are subject only to limited parliamentary oversight. Reserved funds are regulated by Law 11/1995 of 11 May regulating the use and control of appropriations destined for reserved expenditures. They are also governed by the Official Secrets Act regarding their classified status.

The size of the allocation is set annually in the State Budget Act by the national government. Subsequent modifications require authorisation from the Cortes Generales through the parliamentary Commission for Official Secrets, a special oversight body created in 2004 with access to classified information concerning these expenditures.

Article 4 of the 1995 law restricted the use of reserved credits to the ministries responsible for foreign affairs, internal security and defence. In practice, the principal recipient is the National Intelligence Centre, Spain's civilian intelligence agency.

The system has been controversial in Spanish politics, especially following corruption scandals in the 1990s that revealed misuse of the funds by senior officials. Also, the political significance of reserved funds increased during the 1990s after the following series of corruption revelations: On 23 November 1993, the newspaper Diario 16 reported that the director of the Civil Guard, Luis Roldán, had accumulated unexplained personal wealth. On 9 March 1994, El Mundo revealed that senior officials of the Interior Ministry during the government of Felipe González had been receiving undeclared salary supplements financed from reserved funds. A criminal trial later opened against several high-ranking officials, including former Interior ministers José Barrionuevo and José Luis Corcuera, former Director General of State Security Julián Sancristóbal, former Secretary of State for Security Rafael Vera, senior anti-terrorism official Francisco Álvarez, former police chief José María Rodríguez Colorado, and former civil governor of Biscay Iñaki López. The proceedings became known as the reserved funds case. Roldán, initially also charged in the investigation, did not stand trial in this case because he had already been prosecuted separately for illicit enrichment in the Roldán affair. The court ultimately acquitted Barrionuevo and Corcuera, while the remaining defendants received prison sentences ranging from 11 months to seven years.

=== Turkey ===
In Turkey covert appropriations or "discretionary funds" (Turkish: Örtülü ödenek) are allocated to the president, the government or state organs from a yearly state budget. Users of discretionary funds are offered guidelines as to how they may use these funds, but they have complete flexibility in their use. Discretionary funds can be used without approval from Parliament or any other state institution and are seen as tools to help the government achieve its goals without spending much time on bureaucratic work. Before 2015 the covert appropriations were only reserved to state organs and the government, but in March 2015, a regulation granting a discretionary fund for the presidency was passed as part of a government-sponsored omnibus bill in the Turkish Parliament.

The bill, and the discretionary funds in general have been heavily criticized and objected by opposition parties such as Republican People's Party. At the time, it was claimed by opposition parties, that Recep Tayyip Erdoğan was aiming to gain control of the National Intelligence Organization (MİT) with the fund, which was tied to the Prime Ministry back then. MİT was subordinated to the presidency in August 2017.

According to law, covert spending can not exceed 0.5% of total spending in the budget, but an additional 2% can be used as "supplemental appropriations". In 2018 Turkish Ministry of Treasury and Finance estimated that the amount of presidential discretionary funds the President can use between 2019 and 2021 would be TL16.5 billion, 0.5% of total spending in the budget. In 2020 alone, the Presidency was granted TL14.1 billion covert appropriations.

=== United States ===
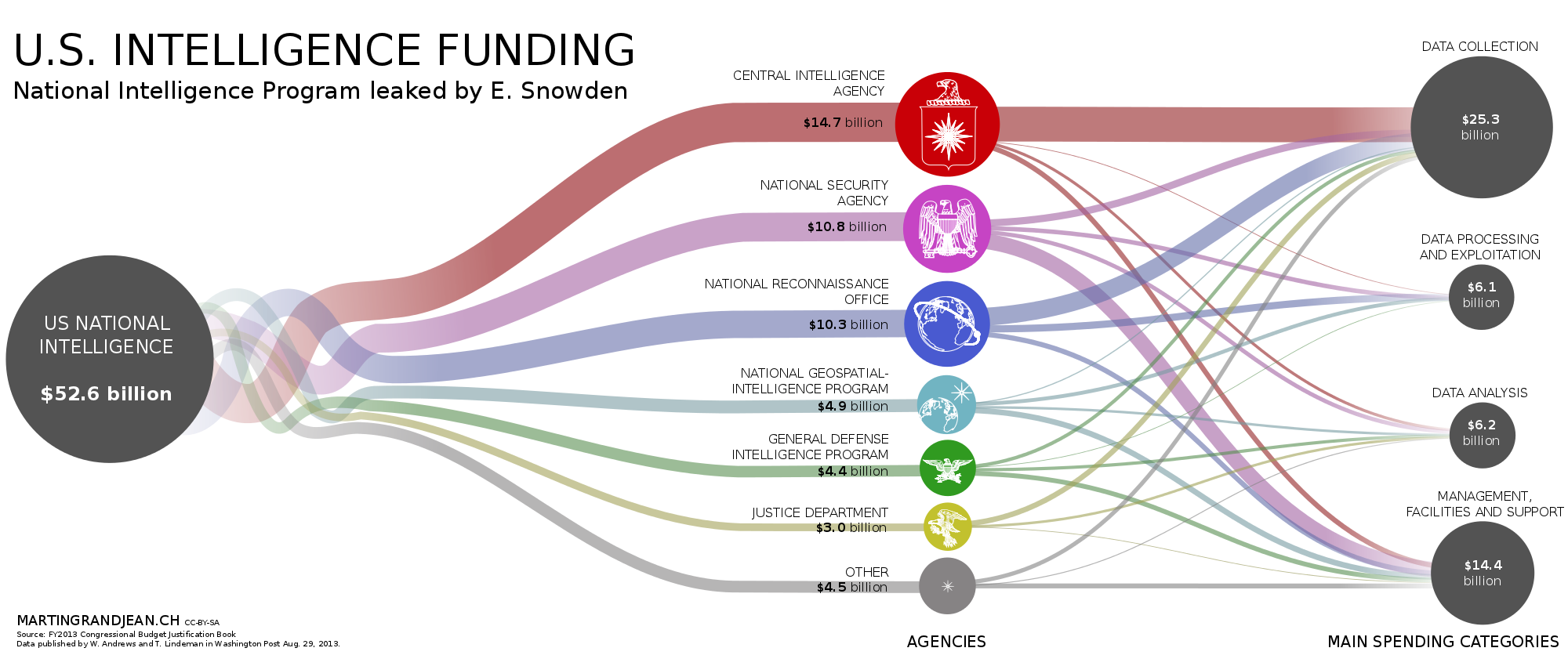
Data infochart of U.S. intelligence black budget (2013)

The United States Department of Defense has a black budget it uses to fund black projects—expenditures that it does not want to disclose publicly. The annual cost of the United States Department of Defense black budget was estimated at $30 billion in 2008, but was increased to an estimated $50 billion in 2009. A black budget article by The Washington Post, based on information given by Edward Snowden, detailed how the US allocated $52.8 billion in 2012 for the black budget.

The black budget has been known to hide multiple types of projects from elected officials. With secret code names and hidden figures, the details of the black budget are revealed only to certain people of Congress, if at all.

This budget was approved by the US National Security Act of 1947, which created the Central Intelligence Agency, the National Security Council and reorganized some military bases with help of the Defense Department.

The U.S. Government claims that the money given to this budget investigates advanced sciences and technologies for military uses. This kind of research is responsible for the creation of new aircraft, weapons, and satellites.

In 2018, some newspapers reported that the Trump administration requested $81.1 billion for the 2019 black budget. The request included $59.9 billion for the National Intelligence Program, covering non-military programs and activities, and $21.2 billion for the Military Intelligence Program which covers Intelligence activities by the Department of Defense. “In total, these two are more than 3.4% higher than the FY2018 request and the largest since then... [and it's] the largest announced since the government began disclosing its intelligence budget request in 2007..." according to The Washington Times' Andrew Blake.

== See also ==
- Contingency Fund for Foreign Intercourse
- Special access program
