= Toledo Pact =

Measures aimed to reform the Spanish social security system

The Toledo Pact (Spanish: Pacto de Toledo) was an ambitious reform of the Spanish social security system approved by the Spanish parliament on 6 April 1995, aimed at streamlining and guaranteeing the future of the Spanish social security system. The background to the reform was a series of recommendations by the World Bank in 1987 and the Delors White Paper in 1993.

== Background ==
In June 1993, the Spanish Socialist Workers' Party (PSOE) had lost seats to the conservative Partido Popular in the general election, leaving it without an overall majority. The PSOE depended on the support of the Catalan party Convergencia i Unio, who proposed a debate about the sustainability of the social security system. In the midst of a recession, the social security system was under pressure from a widespread use of early retirement, used by companies to lay off workers. The unexpected rise in retirees risked plunging the system into systemic deficit.

== Measures ==
The package of measures involved both structural and management changes, including separation of contributary and non-contributary benefits, leaving the social security funding only contributory benefits while non-contributory benefits were to be financed from general taxation.

A significant reform was the creation of a reserve fund, to be financed by surpluses of contributions over costs during periods of strong economic growth and to be used during periods of recession.

The reform also involved a simplification of the numerous special conditions for different categories of workers and unified the contribution levels and ceilings.

Changes were made to improve efficiency and fraud prevention, and an effort was made to encourage employment in labour-intensive industries as well as those requiring highly qualified employees, by reducing contributions. In addition, while maintaining the retirement age at 65 years, those wishing to carry on working beyond 65 would be encouraged by the social security system.

Finally, a permanent parliamentary commission was created in order to monitor and modernise the pact and the system.
