= 1995 Spanish elections =

1995 Spanish elections may refer to one of two nationwide elections held in Spain on 28 May 1995:

- 1995 Spanish local elections, to elect local seats in Spanish municipalities, provinces and island councils.
- 1995 Spanish regional elections, to elect the regional parliaments of thirteen autonomous communities.
