= Ludolfo Paramio =

Spanish journalist and politician (1948–2024)

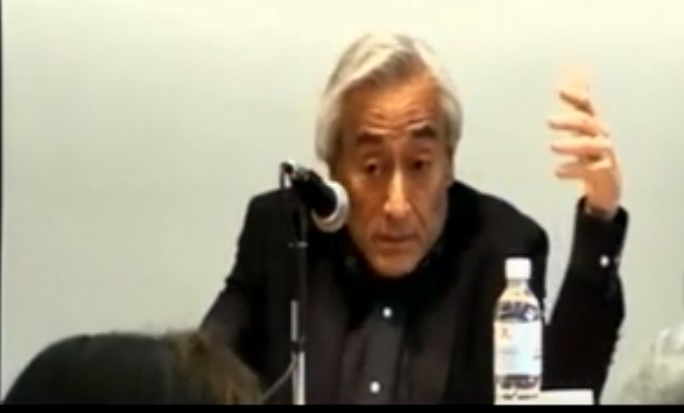
- Image of Ludolfo Paramio
- Born: Ludolfo Paramio Rodrigo; 16 July 1948; Madrid, Spain
- Died: 13 June 2024 (aged 75); Madrid, Spain
- Occupation(s): Journalist, politician and sociologist
- Years active: 1980s–2020s
- Known for: PSOE's political analyst

Ludolfo Paramio Rodrigo (16 July 1948 – 13 June 2024) was a Spanish journalist, politician, and sociologist.

== Biography ==
Paramio graduated in journalism at the Official School of Journalism in Madrid in 1971 and graduated one year later, in 1972. He then started collaborating with the magazine Bang!

In1982 he received his doctorate in physical sciences from the Autonomous University of Madrid, with a thesis on the limits of methodology directed by Javier Muguerza. He joined the Spanish Socialist Workers' Party PSOE, within the faction led by Alfonso Guerra.

At the 1991 PSOE national congress he joined the party's Permanent Executive Commission and he became Training Secretariat. He directed the Pablo Iglesias Foundation and was married to the gynecologist Carmen Martínez Ten.

He has sustained noisy controversies and published numerous articles in magazines like the International Journal of Sociology, or the Spanish Revista Internacional de Sociología, Revista Española de Investigaciones Sociológicas, Revista Española de Ciencia Política, Revista de Estudios Políticos, Revista del Centro de Estudios Constitucionales, Reforma y Democracia: Revista del CLAD, Historia y Política, International Journal of Iberian Studies, Desarrollo Económico, Nexos, América Latina Hoy, Leviatán, Sistema, Zona Abierta and Nueva Sociedad, among others.

He was a professor of sociology at the Autonomous and Complutense Universities of Madrid, and taught doctoral courses at both, the University of the Basque Country, the University of Santiago de Compostela and the International University of Andalucía.

Paramio served as a research professor at the Institute of Policies and Public Goods of the Center for Human and Social Sciences of the CSIC, the Spanish Research Council. He was a member of the Executive Commission of the Latin American Association of Political Science since its founding in July 2002. From May 2004 to April 2008 he was Director of the Department of Analysis and Studies of the Cabinet of the Presidency of the Government, under Jose Luís Rodriguez Zapatero's presidency. He was a professor of graduate courses on Latin American politics at the Ortega y Gasset University Research Institute. He directed the Latin American Program of the José Ortega y Gasset University Research Institute, since May 2008.

== Works ==
Works published in Spanish

- Paramio, L., Mito e ideología, Madrid: Alberto Corazón, 1971.
- Álvarez Vázquez, E., Bevia, H., Bilbatúa, M., Bozal, V., Carmona, A., Linaza, J., Martínez Reverte, J., Paramio, L., *Pozón, L., Alienación e ideología: metodología y dialéctica en los “Grundrisse”, Madrid: Alberto Corazón, 1973.
- Cabrera, M., Cotarelo, R., Paramio, L., Quintanilla, M.A., Vargas Machuca, R., Evolución y crisis de la ideología de izquierdas, Madrid: Pablo Iglesias, 1988.
- Paramio, L., Tras el diluvio: la izquierda ante el fin de siglo, Madrid, 1988.
- Paramio, L., comp., Revista Española de Investigaciones Sociológicas 50: Elecciones latinoamericanas, 1990.
- Alcántara, M., Paramio, L., comps., Revista Internacional de Sociología 7: Transiciones democráticas en América Latina, 1994.
- Paramio, L., Democracia y desarrollo industrial, Cuadernos y Debates 6, Madrid: Centro de Estudios Constitucionales, 1996.
- Paramio, L., Democracia y desigualdad en América Latina, México: Instituto Federal Electoral, 1999.
- Paramio, L., comp., Zona Abierta 88-89: La política de las reformas económicas, 1999.
- Paramio, L., comp., Zona Abierta 90-91: La política de las reformas económicas (2), 2000.
- Paramio, L., Revilla, M., comps., Una nueva agenda de reformas políticas en América Latina, Madrid: Fundación Carolina & Siglo XXI, 2006.
- Alcántara, M., Paramio, L., Freidenberg, F., y Déniz, J., Historia contemporánea de América Latina, vol. 6, 1980-2006: Reformas económicas y consolidación democrática, Madrid: Síntesis, 2006.
- Paramio, L., Revilla, M., comps., Una nueva agenda de reformas políticas en América Latina, Madrid: Fundación Carolina & Siglo XXI, 2006.
- Paramio, L., “El discurso de la izquierda española”, Umbrales 1: 9-20, marzo de 2007.
- Paramio, L., “La derecha en transición”, Nexos 355: 23–27, julio de 2007.
- Paramio, L., “Cuatro años después”, Umbrales 5: 5–18, abril-julio de 2008.
- Paramio, L., “La socialdemocracia”, Madrid: La Catarata, 2009.
