= Attempted assassination of Juan Carlos I =

Failed assassination attempt against Juan Carlos I

The Basque separatist group Euskadi Ta Askatasuna (ETA) prepared an attack on the King of Spain Juan Carlos I in the summer of 1995.

Juan Carlos spent his holidays at Mallorca. A three-man ETA command had rented an apartment in Palma de Mallorca in the district of Porto Pí. From there it is possible to see the part of the harbor where the holiday yacht of Juan Carlos I was located. In the apartment, the ETA command had a Mauser precision rifle, caliber 7.62 with silencer, riflescope, bipod and Dum-Dum projectiles ready. A sniper would shoot the king on his motor yacht about 250 meters away. The coup was eventually discovered, resulting in the arrest of the command in August 1995 by the special unit of the Spanish police (GEO).

In the ensuing trial of the suspects, they denounced the king as the chief perpetrator of the "oppression" of the Basques; they called for a vote on the independence demands of ETA.

In 2009, ETA also committed several attacks in Mallorca. In the middle of the high season, two civil servants of the Civil Guard were killed and several passers-by injured. A few days later, King Juan Carlos and Queen Sofía would visit the Marivent Palace eight kilometers from the point of attack.

In 2015, the confiscated sniper rifle and other utensils of the case were part of a counter-terrorism exhibition organized by the National Police in the Military History Center in Majorca.
