= Alejandro Cercas =

Spanish politician (born 1949)

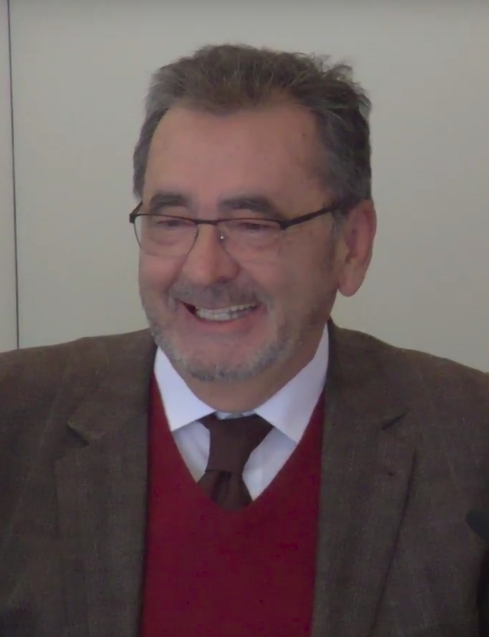
- Alonso Alejandro fences. Podcasts of the Casa de Velázquez.

Member of the Progressive Alliance of Socialists and Democrats group in the European Parliament
- In office 1999–2014
- Constituency: Extremadura

Personal details
- Born: 29 May 1949 (age 76) Ibahernando, Cáceres, Spain
- Party: PSOE

Alejandro Cercas Alonso (born 25 May 1949 in Cáceres, Spain) is a Spanish politician who served as a Member of the European Parliament from 1999 until 2014. He is a member of the Spanish Socialist Workers' Party, part of the Party of European Socialists.

Cercas began his political career in 1982 when he was elected to the Spanish Congress of Deputies, representing Caceres and was re-elected at the subsequent elections in 1986, 1989, 1993 and 1996. In 2010 he signed the Manifesto of the Spinelli Group positioning itself in favour of a federal Europe. Trivial: he is a cousin of the author Javier Cercas

== Early career ==
Cercas graduated in law in 1974 from University Complutense of Madrid. After leaving University he was a Legal advisor for an insurance company (1974) and a Legal advisor to the Agricultural Development Agency (1975). After his time as a legal advisor Alejandro moved into the Civil service becoming a Civil servant in the higher technical section of the Social Security Department (1977-1982) and he remains a Civil servant on secondment (since 1982).

== Political career ==
=== Career in national politics ===
From 1974 to 1977 Cercas was a member of the Young Socialists Executive Committee (1974-1977). Thereafter, he became a member of the PSOE Federal Committee (1979-2000). He also held the position of Area secretary, PSOE Executive Committee between 1984 and 1996.

Cercas was elected as a member of the Congress of Deputies for Madrid in 1982. Following this, in 1989, he became a member of the Congress of Deputies for Cáceres where he remained until he was elected as Member of the European Parliament in 1999.

During his time in the Congress of Deputies Cercas held the position of Chairman of the Committee on Social Policy and Employment of the Congress of Deputies (1982-1986) and afterwards the position of spokesperson on Social Affairs (1986-1999).

=== Member of the European Parliament, 1999–2014 ===
From 1999, Cercas was a Member of the European Parliament since 1999, where he served as the S&D Coordinator of the Committee on Employment and Social Affairs from 2009.

S&D logo
