= Luis Roldán =

Spanish politician (1943–2022)

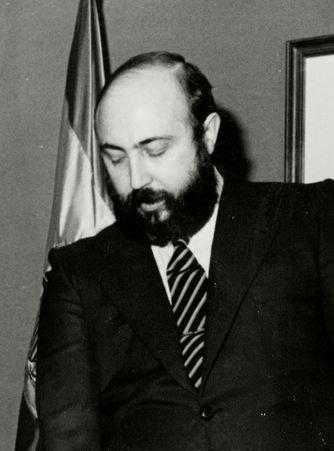
- Roldán in 1986

Director General of the Civil Guard
- In office 31 December 1986 – 3 December 1993
- Preceded by: José Antonio Sáenz de Santa María
- Succeeded by: Ferran Cardenal de Alemany

Personal details
- Born: Luis Roldán Ibáñez; 16 August 1943 Zaragoza, Spain
- Died: 24 March 2022 (aged 78) Zaragoza, Spain
- Party: Socialist Workers' Party
- Education: UNED (real), University of Saragossa

Luis Roldán Ibáñez (22 August 1943 – 24 March 2022) was a Spanish Socialist Workers' Party politician known for being the director general of the Civil Guard when a big scandal of corruption arose in 1993. This case, along with the GAL case, greatly contributed to the defeat of the PSOE in the 1996 general election. Upon initiation of prosecution for his criminal activities, Roldán escaped from Spain in 1994. He surrendered in 1995 at the airport in Bangkok. Between 1996 and 1998 he was tried in a court in Madrid. He was sentenced to 28 years in prison for embezzlement, bribery, tax evasion, and fraud, which the Supreme Court increased to 31 years. He was from February 1995 in the prison of Brieva (Ávila), which is normally used to house women offenders but has a secluded unit in which men can serve their sentences. In 2005 he was allowed out of prison to work in an intermediate regime between the second and third degree.

== Political career ==
A long time member of the Spanish Socialist Workers' Party and of the Unión General de Trabajadores trade-union, Roldán presented himself as holding a B.Sc. (Industrial Engineering) from the University of Zaragoza. Journalistic research proved that this degree was a fake.

After the socialist victory in the 1982 general elections Roldán was named Government's Delegate in Navarre, a position he held until 1986 when he became the first civilian to command the Civil Guard, (Spain's gendarmerie force).

Under his direction, major changes leading to the modernisation of the corps were undertaken. A program to reform and upgrade the residential barracks (many being in very bad state); women were recruited for the first time for the Civil Guard; the Maritime Service of the Civil Guard was created; remnants of past political investigations were eliminated; and the counter-terrorism and intelligence services of the corps were enhanced, obtaining great success in infiltrating the separatist group ETA, leading to operations such as the arrest of the leadership of the organization in Bidart on 29 March 1992.

Under his direction the Civil Guard saw the appearance of an internal protest movement, composed mostly of enlisted personnel and NCOs, seeking to better the working conditions and the de-militarisation and democratisation of the Corps, forming a clandestine union of Civil Guardsmen.

=== Corruption ===
While Roldán was director, defective Filipino-made bullets of 9 mm Parabellum were purchased which injured military personnel. In 1993 the newspaper Diario 16 published the first suspicions concerning excessive increase of the wealth of Luis Roldán, which eventually led to his dismissal on 3 December of that year. Roldán fled the country in early 1994 when it was discovered that he had used his office to amass a fortune through fraudulent means, resulting in the resignation of Interior Minister Antoni Asunción, responsible for monitoring Roldán, as a consequence. During his time missing, Roldán sent letters admitting partial guilt and accusing other Interior Ministry high-ranking members of having received extra money from the fondos reservados (Spanish for reserved funds) theoretically destined to finance the fight against terrorism and drug trafficking. Among those he accused was former minister José Luis Corcuera, but also PM González of 'being aware of everything'. Roldán was arrested on 27 February 1995 in Bangkok's Don Muang Airport, amidst claims that Roldán and the Socialist government had reached an agreement in which Roldán would agree to get caught in exchange for him being charged with just two crimes: bribery and embezzlement. These claims came to be known as the "Laos papers", yet the PSOE government refused to recognize their veracity.

=== Jail and subsequent life ===
Roldán was sent to the prison of Brieva (Ávila) which is normally used to house women offenders but has a secluded unit in which men can serve their sentences in February 1995. In 2005 he was allowed out of prison to work during the day but had to return to the lockup at night.

Judges raised 1,646,845 euros in civil procedure seizure of bank accounts and the auction of some of the properties seized in Spain. The bulk of his fortune, estimated at 10 million euros in 1993, is missing.

On 19 March 2010, he was released from prison after 15 years.

== Death ==
On 24 March 2022 Roldán died in Zaragoza at the San Juan de Dios Hospital in the Aragonese capital after several weeks in hospital. He died at age of 78.

== Popular culture ==
In 2015, writer Fernando Sánchez Dragó published a fictionalized biography of Roldán, with his collaboration.

Another book, Paesa, el espía de las mil caras by Manuel Cerdán formed the basis of the 2016 Spanish film, Smoke & Mirrors, in which Roldán is played by actor Carlos Santos.
