= First government of Felipe González =

1982–1986 government of Spain

1st government of Felipe González
- Government of Spain
- 1982–1986
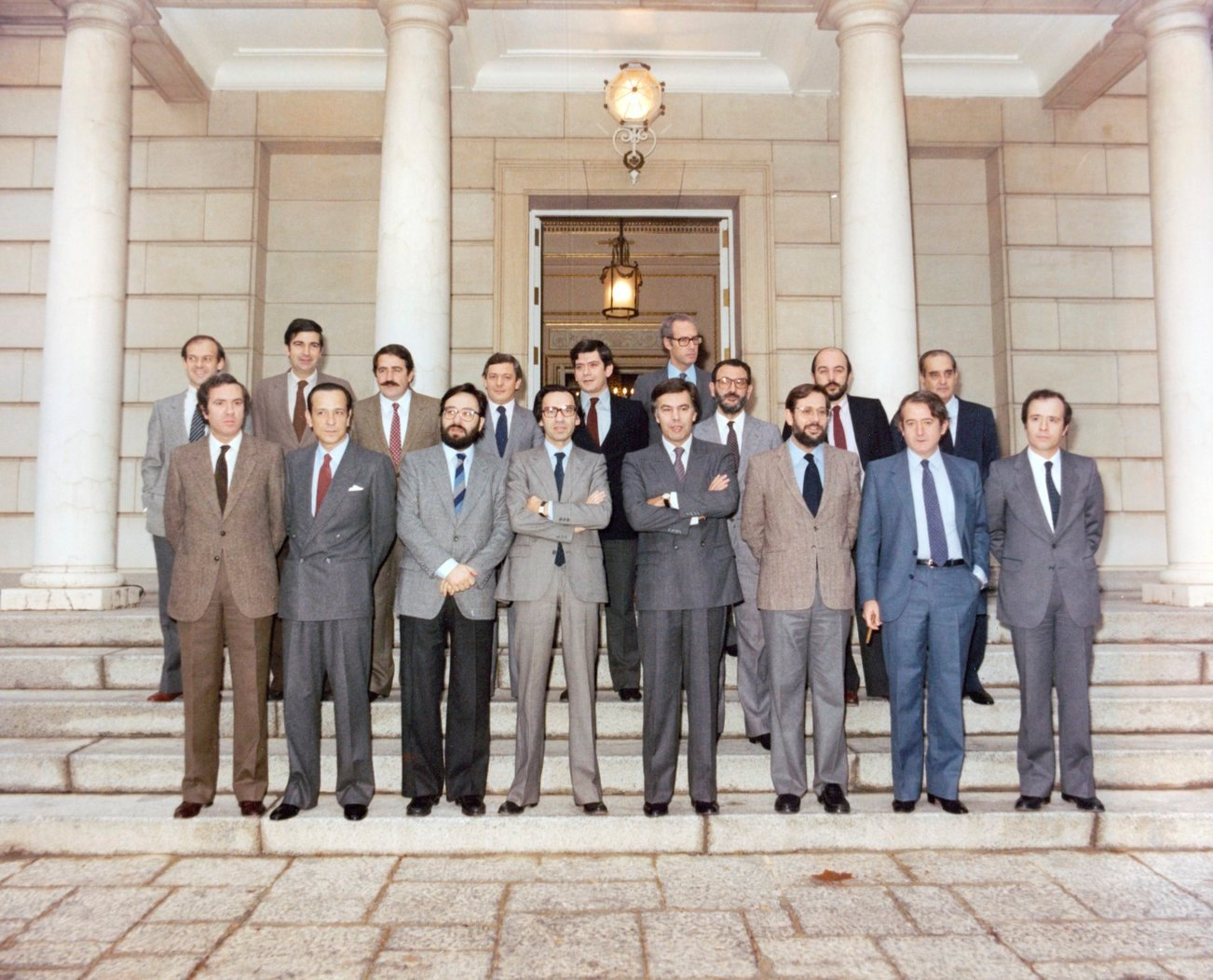
- The government in December 1982
- Date formed: 3 December 1982
- Date dissolved: 26 July 1986

People and organisations
- Monarch: Juan Carlos I
- Prime Minister: Felipe González
- Deputy Prime Minister: Alfonso Guerra
- No. of ministers: 16 (Note: Does not include the prime minister.)
- Total no. of members: 21
- Member party: PSOE
- Status in legislature: Majority (single-party)
- Opposition party: AP–PDP (1982–1983); AP–PDP–UL (1983–1984); AP–PDP–PL (1984–1986)
- Opposition leader: Manuel Fraga

History
- Election: 1982 general election
- Outgoing election: 1986 general election
- Legislature term: 2nd Cortes Generales
- Budget: 1983, 1984, 1985, 1986
- Predecessor: Calvo-Sotelo
- Successor: González II

The first government of Felipe González was formed on 3 December 1982, following the latter's election as prime minister of Spain by the Congress of Deputies on 1 December and his swearing-in on 2 December, as a result of the Spanish Socialist Workers' Party (PSOE) emerging as the largest parliamentary force at the 1982 Spanish general election. It succeeded the Calvo-Sotelo government and was the government of Spain from 3 December 1982 to 26 July 1986, a total of 1,331 days, or 3 years, 7 months and 23 days.

González's first cabinet marked several firsts in Spanish history: it was the first purely left-of-centre government in Spain under the monarchy in Spain, as well as the first one to be set up in peacetime period. It comprised members of the PSOE (including its sister party, the Socialists' Party of Catalonia (PSC), as well as one member from the Democratic Action Party (PAD), which had contested the 1982 election in alliance with the PSOE and would merge into it in January 1983) and one independent. It was automatically dismissed on 23 June 1986 as a consequence of the 1986 general election, but remained in acting capacity until the next government was sworn in.

== Investiture ==
Investiture; Congress of Deputies; Nomination of Felipe González (PSOE)
Ballot →	1 December 1982
Required majority →	176 out of 350
Yes: • PSOE (200); • PCE (4); • CDS (2); • EE (1)	207 / 350
No: • AP–PDP (104); • UCD (12)	116 / 350
Abstentions: • CiU (12); • PNV (8); • ERC (1)	21 / 350
Absentees: • AP–PDP (2); • HB (2); • PSOE (1)	5 / 350

== Council of Ministers ==
The Council of Ministers was structured into the offices for the prime minister, the deputy prime minister and 15 ministries. Shortly after coming into office, the Finance and Economy and Trade portfolios were merged into a single Economy and Finance ministry.

← González I Government → (3 December 1982 – 26 July 1986)
Portfolio	Name	Party	Took office	Left office	Ref.
Prime Minister	Felipe González	PSOE	2 December 1982	24 July 1986	
Deputy Prime Minister	Alfonso Guerra	PSOE	3 December 1982	26 July 1986	
Minister of Foreign Affairs	Fernando Morán	PSOE	3 December 1982	5 July 1985	
Minister of Justice	Fernando Ledesma	Independent	3 December 1982	26 July 1986	
Minister of Defence	Narcís Serra	PSOE^{/PSC}	3 December 1982	26 July 1986	
Minister of Finance; Minister of Economy and Trade	Miguel Boyer	PSOE	3 December 1982	8 December 1982	
Minister of the Interior	José Barrionuevo	PSOE	3 December 1982	26 July 1986	
Minister of Public Works and Urbanism	Julián Campo	PSOE	3 December 1982	5 July 1985	
Minister of Education and Science	José María Maravall	PSOE	3 December 1982	26 July 1986	
Minister of Labour and Social Security	Joaquín Almunia	PSOE	3 December 1982	26 July 1986	
Minister of Industry and Energy	Carlos Solchaga	PSOE	3 December 1982	5 July 1985	
Minister of Agriculture, Fisheries and Food	Carlos Romero	PSOE	3 December 1982	26 July 1986	
Minister of the Presidency	Javier Moscoso	PSOE^{/PAD) (Note: Joined the PSOE upon the dissolution of the PAD in January 1983.)}	3 December 1982	26 July 1986	
Minister of Transport, Tourism and Communications	Enrique Barón	PSOE	3 December 1982	5 July 1985	
Minister of Culture	Javier Solana	PSOE	3 December 1982	26 July 1986	
Minister of Territorial Administration	Tomás de la Quadra-Salcedo	PSOE	3 December 1982	5 July 1985	
Minister of Health and Consumer Affairs	Ernest Lluch	PSOE^{/PSC}	3 December 1982	26 July 1986	
=== Changes December 1982 ===
Portfolio	Name	Party	Took office	Left office	Ref.
Minister of Economy and Finance (Note: On 8 December 1982, the Ministry of Finance and the Ministry of Economy and Trade were restructured and merged into the newly-established Ministry of Economy and Finance.)	Miguel Boyer	PSOE	8 December 1982	5 July 1985	
~~Minister of Economy and Trade~~	Merged into the Ministry of Economy and Finance on 8 December 1982.				
=== Changes July 1985 ===
Portfolio	Name	Party	Took office	Left office	Ref.
Minister of Foreign Affairs	Francisco Fernández Ordóñez	PSOE	5 July 1985	26 July 1986	
Minister of Economy and Finance	Carlos Solchaga	PSOE	5 July 1985	26 July 1986	
Minister of Public Works and Urbanism	Javier Sáenz de Cosculluela	PSOE	5 July 1985	26 July 1986	
Minister of Industry and Energy	Joan Majó	PSOE^{/PSC}	5 July 1985	26 July 1986	
Minister of Transport, Tourism and Communications	Abel Caballero	PSOE	5 July 1985	26 July 1986	
Minister of Territorial Administration	Félix Pons	PSOE	5 July 1985	14 July 1986	
=== Changes July 1986 ===
Portfolio	Name	Party	Took office	Left office	Ref.
Minister of Territorial Administration	Javier Moscoso took on the ordinary discharge of duties from 14 to 26 July 1986.				

== Departmental structure ==
Felipe González's first government was organised into several superior and governing units, whose number, powers and hierarchical structure varied depending on the ministerial department.

Unit/body rank

- (■) Secretary of state
- (■) Undersecretary
- (■) Director-general
- (●) Autonomous agency
- (◆) Military & intelligence agency

Office (Original name)	Portrait	Name	Took office	Left office	Alliance/party	Ref.
=== Prime Minister's Office ===
Prime Minister (Presidencia del Gobierno)		Felipe González	2 December 1982	24 July 1986	PSOE	
Prime Minister (Presidencia del Gobierno)	24 December 1982 – 26 July 1986: (■) Office of the Spokesperson of the Government; (■) General Secretariat of the Office of the Spokesperson of the Government (est. 18 Jul 1985); (■) Directorate-General for Information Relations; (■) Directorate-General for Information Cooperation; (■) State Secretariat for Relations with the Cortes and Legislative Coordination; (■) Directorate-General for Relations with the Congress of Deputies; (■) Directorate-General for Relations with the Senate; (■) Cabinet of the Prime Minister's Office–Chief of Staff; (■) Deputy Chief of Staff; (■) Secretariat of the Prime Minister's Office; (■) Chief of Protocol of the State (est. 8 Aug 1983); (■) Chief of Security of the Prime Minister's Office (from 8 Aug 1983); (■) Chief of Operational Resources of the Prime Minister's Office (est. 8 Aug 1983); (■) General Secretariat of the Prime Minister's Office; (■) Directorate-General for Social Communication Media; (■) Directorate-General of the Centre for Sociological Research; (■) Chief of Security of the Prime Minister's Office (est. 29 Jan 1983; until 8 Aug 1983)					
Deputy Prime Minister (Vicepresidencia del Gobierno)		Alfonso Guerra	3 December 1982	26 July 1986	PSOE	
Deputy Prime Minister (Vicepresidencia del Gobierno)	24 December 1982 – 16 December 1989: (■) Secretariat of the Deputy Prime Minister's Office					
=== Ministry of Foreign Affairs ===
Ministry of Foreign Affairs (Ministerio de Asuntos Exteriores)		Fernando Morán	3 December 1982	5 July 1985	PSOE	
Ministry of Foreign Affairs (Ministerio de Asuntos Exteriores)		Francisco Fernández Ordóñez	5 July 1985	26 July 1986	PSOE	
Ministry of Foreign Affairs (Ministerio de Asuntos Exteriores)	8 December 1982 – 29 August 1985: (■) State Secretariat for Relations with the European Communities; (■) Deputy General Secretariat for Relations with the European Communities (disest. 29 Mar 1983); (■) Technical Secretariat (disest. 29 Mar 1983); (■) Undersecretariat of Foreign Affairs; (■) Technical General Secretariat; (■) Directorate-General for Foreign Policy for Europe and Atlantic Affairs (disest. 29 Mar 1983); (■) Directorate-General for Foreign Policy for Europe (est. 29 Mar 1983); (■) Directorate-General for Foreign Policy for North America and the Pacific; (■) Directorate-General for Foreign Policy for Africa and Continental Asia; (■) Directorate-General for Foreign Policy for Ibero-America; (■) Directorate-General for the Foreign Service; (■) Directorate-General for International Economic Relations; (■) Directorate-General for Cultural Relations; (■) Directorate-General for Consular Affairs; (■) Directorate-General for International Technical Coordination; (■) Directorate-General for International Organizations and Conferences; (■) Directorate-General of the Office for Diplomatic Information; (■) Directorate-General for International Affairs of Security and Disarmament; (■) Service for Protocol, Chancery and Orders–First Introducer of Ambassadors; (■) Office for Cooperation with Equatorial Guinea (est. 29 Mar 1983); (■) Deputy Extraordinary Ambassador to the Minister (est. 29 Mar 1983); (■) Ambassador on Special Mission (est. 29 Mar 1983); 29 August 1985 – 24 December 1988: (■) State Secretariat for the European Communities; (■) General Secretariat for the European Communities; (■) Directorate-General for Community Technical Coordination; (■) Directorate-General for Community Legal and Institutional Coordination; (■) State Secretariat for International Cooperation and for Ibero-America; (■) Directorate-General for Cultural Relations; (■) Directorate-General for International Technical Coordination; (■) Directorate-General for International Economic Relations; (■) Undersecretariat of Foreign Affairs; (■) Technical General Secretariat; (■) Directorate-General for the Foreign Service; (■) Directorate-General for Consular Affairs; (■) General Secretariat for Foreign Policy; (■) Directorate-General for Foreign Policy for Europe; (■) Directorate-General for Foreign Policy for Ibero-America; (■) Directorate-General for Foreign Policy for North America and Asia; (■) Directorate-General for Foreign Policy for Africa and the Middle East; (■) Directorate-General for International Organizations and Conferences; (■) Directorate-General for International Affairs of Security and Disarmament; (■) Service for Protocol, Chancery and Orders–First Introducer of Ambassadors; (■) Directorate-General of the Office for Diplomatic Information					
=== Ministry of Justice ===
Ministry of Justice (Ministerio de Justicia)		Fernando Ledesma	3 December 1982	26 July 1986	PSOE (Independent)	
Ministry of Justice (Ministerio de Justicia)	7 November 1980 – 17 August 1985: (■) Undersecretariat of Justice; (■) Technical General Secretariat; (■) Directorate-General for Relations with the Administration of Justice; (■) Directorate-General for Religious Affairs; (■) Directorate-General for Registries and Notaries; (■) Directorate-General for Penitentiary Institutions; 17 August 1985 – 17 January 1991: (■) Undersecretariat of Justice; (■) Technical General Secretariat; (■) Directorate-General for Services; (■) Directorate-General for Relations with the Administration of Justice; (■) Directorate-General for Religious Affairs; (■) Directorate-General for Registries and Notaries; (■) Directorate-General for Penitentiary Institutions; (■) Directorate-General of the State Legal Service; (■) Directorate-General for the Legal Protection of Minors					
=== Ministry of Defence ===
Ministry of Defence (Ministerio de Defensa)		Narcís Serra	3 December 1982	26 July 1986	PSOE (PSC–PSOE)	
Ministry of Defence (Ministerio de Defensa)	(■) Undersecretariat of Defence; (■) Undersecretariat of Defence Policy					
=== Ministry of Economy and Finance ===
Ministry of Finance; Ministry of Economy and Trade (Ministerio de Hacienda; Ministerio de Economía y Comercio) (until 8 December 1982) Ministry of Economy and Finance (Ministerio de Economía y Hacienda) (from 8 December 1982)		Miguel Boyer	3 December 1982	5 July 1985	PSOE	
Ministry of Finance; Ministry of Economy and Trade (Ministerio de Hacienda; Ministerio de Economía y Comercio) (until 8 December 1982) Ministry of Economy and Finance (Ministerio de Economía y Hacienda) (from 8 December 1982)		Carlos Solchaga	5 July 1985	26 July 1986	PSOE	
Ministry of Finance; Ministry of Economy and Trade (Ministerio de Hacienda; Ministerio de Economía y Comercio) (until 8 December 1982) Ministry of Economy and Finance (Ministerio de Economía y Hacienda) (from 8 December 1982)	8–24 December 1982: (■) State Secretariat for Finance; (■) State Secretariat for Economy and Planning; (■) State Secretariat for Trade; (■) Undersecretariat of Economy and Finance; (■) General Secretariat for Budget and Public Expenditure; (■) General Secretariat for Economy and Planning; (■) Undersecretariat of Budgets and Public Expenditure; (■) Directorate-General for the Treasury; (■) Directorate-General for Budgets; (■) Directorate-General for the State Heritage; (■) Directorate-General for Insurance; (■) Directorate-General for Customs; (■) Directorate-General for State Litigation; (■) Directorate-General for Taxes; (■) Directorate-General for Tax Inspection and Investigation; (■) Office of the Comptroller General of the State Administration; (■) Technical General Secretariat of the Ministry of Finance; (■) Directorate-General for Economic Policy and Forecast; (■) Directorate-General for Planning; (■) Directorate-General for Financial Policy; (■) Directorate-General for the National Institute of Statistics; (■) Directorate-General for Internal Trade; (■) Directorate-General for Coordination and Services; (■) Directorate-General for Trade Policy; (■) Directorate-General for Tariff Policy and Imports; (■) Directorate-General for Exports; (■) Directorate-General for Foreign Transactions; (■) Technical General Secretariat of the Ministry of Economy and Trade; 24 December 1982 – 9 September 1983: (■) State Secretariat for Finance; (■) General Secretariat for Budget and Public Expenditure; (■) Directorate-General for Taxes; (■) Directorate-General for Customs and Special Taxes; (■) Directorate-General for State Litigation; (■) Directorate-General for the State Heritage; (■) Directorate-General for Coordination with the Territorial Treasuries; (■) Directorate-General for Financial and Tax Inspection; (■) Directorate-General for Budgets; (■) Office of the Comptroller General of the State Administration; (■) State Secretariat for Economy and Planning; (■) General Secretariat for Economy and Planning; (■) Directorate-General for Planning; (■) Directorate-General for Plan Coordination; (■) Directorate-General for Economic Policy; (■) Directorate-General for Forecast and Conjuncture; (■) Directorate-General for the National Institute of Statistics; (■) Directorate-General for the Treasury and Financial Policy; (■) Directorate-General for Insurance; (■) State Secretariat for Trade; (■) General Secretariat for Trade; (■) Directorate-General for Trade Policy; (■) Directorate-General for Tariff Policy and Imports; (■) Directorate-General for Exports; (■) Directorate-General for Foreign Transactions; (■) Directorate-General for Internal Trade; (■) Undersecretariat of Economy and Finance; (■) Directorate-General for Services; (■) Technical General Secretariat; 9 September 1983 – 9 February 1984: (■) State Secretariat for Finance; (■) General Secretariat for Budget and Public Expenditure; (■) Office of the Comptroller General of the State Administration; (■) Directorate-General for Budgets; (■) Directorate-General for Coordination with the Territorial Treasuries; (■) Directorate-General for Personnel Expenditures; (■) Directorate-General for Taxes; (■) Directorate-General for Customs and Special Taxes; (■) Directorate-General for State Litigation; (■) Directorate-General for the State Heritage; (■) Directorate-General for Financial and Tax Inspection; (■) State Secretariat for Economy and Planning; (■) General Secretariat for Economy and Planning; (■) Directorate-General for Economic Policy; (■) Directorate-General for Forecast and Conjuncture; (■) Directorate-General for Planning; (■) Directorate-General for Plan Coordination; (■) Directorate-General for the National Institute of Statistics; (■) Directorate-General for the Treasury and Financial Policy; (■) Directorate-General for Insurance; (■) State Secretariat for Trade; (■) General Secretariat for Trade; (■) Directorate-General for Trade Policy; (■) Directorate-General for Tariff Policy and Imports; (■) Directorate-General for Exports; (■) Directorate-General for Foreign Transactions; (■) Directorate-General for Internal Trade; (■) Undersecretariat of Economy and Finance; (■) Directorate-General for Services; (■) Technical General Secretariat; (■) Inspectorate-General of the Ministry of Economy and Finance; 9 February 1984 – 22 February 1987: (■) State Secretariat for Finance; (■) General Secretariat for Finance; (■) Office of the Comptroller General of the State Administration; (■) Directorate-General for Customs and Special Taxes; (■) Directorate-General for Financial and Tax Inspection; (■) Inspectorate-General of the Ministry of Economy and Finance; (■) Directorate-General for Taxes; (■) Directorate-General for Budgets; (■) Directorate-General for Personnel Expenditures; (■) Directorate-General for Coordination with the Territorial Treasuries; (■) State Secretariat for Economy and Planning; (■) General Secretariat for Economy and Planning; (■) Directorate-General for Economic Policy; (■) Directorate-General for Forecast and Conjuncture; (■) Directorate-General for Planning; (■) Directorate-General for Plan Coordination; (■) Directorate-General for the National Institute of Statistics; (■) Directorate-General for the Treasury and Financial Policy; (■) Directorate-General for Insurance; (■) State Secretariat for Trade; (■) General Secretariat for Trade; (■) Directorate-General for Trade Policy; (■) Directorate-General for Tariff Policy and Imports; (■) Directorate-General for Exports; (■) Directorate-General for Foreign Transactions; (■) Directorate-General for Internal Trade; (■) Undersecretariat of Economy and Finance; (■) Directorate-General for Services; (■) Technical General Secretariat; (■) Directorate-General for State Litigation; (■) Directorate-General for the State Heritage					
=== Ministry of the Interior ===
Ministry of the Interior (Ministerio del Interior)		José Barrionuevo	3 December 1982	26 July 1986	PSOE	
Ministry of the Interior (Ministerio del Interior)	(■) Directorate for State Security; (■) Undersecretariat of the Interior					
=== Ministry of Public Works and Urbanism ===
Ministry of Public Works and Urbanism (Ministerio de Obras Públicas y Urbanismo)		Julián Campo	3 December 1982	5 July 1985	PSOE	
Ministry of Public Works and Urbanism (Ministerio de Obras Públicas y Urbanismo)		Javier Sáenz de Cosculluela	5 July 1985	26 July 1986	PSOE	
Ministry of Public Works and Urbanism (Ministerio de Obras Públicas y Urbanismo)	(■) Undersecretariat of Public Works and Urbanism					
=== Ministry of Education and Science ===
Ministry of Education and Science (Ministerio de Educación y Ciencia)		José María Maravall	3 December 1982	26 July 1986	PSOE	
Ministry of Education and Science (Ministerio de Educación y Ciencia)	8 December 1982 – 21 May 1983: (■) State Secretariat for Universities and Research; (■) Directorate-General for University Planning and Teaching Staff; (■) Directorate-General for Science Policy; (■) Undersecretariat of Education and Science; (■) Directorate-General for Personnel; (■) Directorate-General for Planning and Investments; (■) Office for Coordination and High Inspection; (■) Technical General Secretariat; (■) Directorate-General for Basic Education; (■) Directorate-General for Secondary Education; 21 May 1983 – 18 April 1985: (■) State Secretariat for Universities and Research; (■) Directorate-General for University Education; (■) Directorate-General for Science Policy; (■) Undersecretariat of Education and Science; (■) Directorate-General for Coordination and High Inspection; (■) Directorate-General for Planning and Investments; (■) Directorate-General for Personnel and Services; (■) Directorate-General for Basic Education; (■) Directorate-General for Secondary Education; (■) Directorate-General for Educational Promotion; (■) Technical General Secretariat; 18 April 1985 – 9 November 1986: (■) State Secretariat for Universities and Research; (■) Directorate-General for University Education; (■) Directorate-General for Science Policy; (■) Undersecretariat of Education and Science; (■) Technical General Secretariat; (■) Directorate-General for Coordination and High Inspection; (■) Directorate-General for Planning and Investments; (■) Directorate-General for Personnel and Services; (■) General Secretariat for Education; (■) Directorate-General for Basic Education; (■) Directorate-General for Secondary Education; (■) Directorate-General for Educational Promotion					
=== Ministry of Labour and Social Security ===
Ministry of Labour and Social Security (Ministerio de Trabajo y Seguridad Social)		Joaquín Almunia	3 December 1982	26 July 1986	PSOE	
Ministry of Labour and Social Security (Ministerio de Trabajo y Seguridad Social)	27 January 1983 – 25 April 1985: (■) Undersecretariat of Labour and Social Security; (■) Directorate-General for Labour; (■) Directorate-General for Employment; (■) Directorate-General for Cooperatives; (■) Directorate-General for Services; (■) General Secretariat for Social Security; (■) Directorate-General for Economic and Legal Regime of the Social Security; (■) Directorate-General for Social Action; (■) Office of the Comptroller General of the Social Security; (■) Technical General Secretariat; 25 April 1985 – 14 July 1993: (■) Undersecretariat of Labour and Social Security; (■) Technical General Secretariat; (■) Directorate-General for Services; (■) Directorate-General for Personnel; (■) Directorate-General for Labour and Social Security Inspection; (■) Directorate-General for Informatics and Statistics; (■) Directorate-General of the Spanish Institute for Emigration; (■) General Secretariat for Employment and Labour Relations; (■) Directorate-General for Labour; (■) Directorate-General for Employment; (■) Directorate-General for Cooperatives and Labour Relations; (■) General Secretariat for Social Security; (■) Directorate-General for Economic Regime of the Social Security; (■) Directorate-General for Social Action; (■) Directorate-General for Legal Regime of the Social Security; (■) Office of the Comptroller General of the Social Security					
=== Ministry of Industry and Energy ===
Ministry of Industry and Energy (Ministerio de Industria y Energía)		Carlos Solchaga	3 December 1982	5 July 1985	PSOE	
Ministry of Industry and Energy (Ministerio de Industria y Energía)		Joan Majó	5 July 1985	26 July 1986	PSOE (PSC–PSOE)	
Ministry of Industry and Energy (Ministerio de Industria y Energía)	8–16 December 1982: (■) Undersecretariat of Industry and Energy; (■) Commissariat for Energy and Mineral Resources; (■) General Secretariat for Energy and Mineral Resources; (■) Technical General Secretariat; (■) Directorate-General for Mines; (■) Directorate-General for Energy; (■) Directorate-General for Steel and Naval Industries; (■) Directorate-General for Chemical, Textile and Pharmaceutical Industries; (■) Directorate-General for Automotive and Construction Industries; (■) Directorate-General for Electronics and Informatics; (■) Directorate-General for Food Industries and the Small and Medium-sized Industry; (■) Directorate-General for Industrial Innovation and Technology; 16 December 1982 – 30 October 1988: (■) Undersecretariat of Industry and Energy; (■) General Secretariat for Energy and Mineral Resources; (■) Directorate-General for Mines; (■) Directorate-General for Energy; (■) Technical General Secretariat; (■) Directorate-General for Steel and Naval Industries; (■) Directorate-General for Chemical, Construction, Textile and Pharmaceutical Industries; (■) Directorate-General for Electronics and Informatics; (■) Directorate-General for Food Industries and the Small and Medium-sized Industry; (■) Directorate-General for Industrial Innovation and Technology; (■) Directorate-General for Services					
=== Ministry of Agriculture, Fisheries and Food ===
Ministry of Agriculture, Fisheries and Food (Ministerio de Agricultura, Pesca y Alimentación)		Carlos Romero	3 December 1982	26 July 1986	PSOE	
Ministry of Agriculture, Fisheries and Food (Ministerio de Agricultura, Pesca y Alimentación)	(■) Undersecretariat of Agriculture, Fisheries and Food; (■) Directorate-General for Agricultural Research and Training; (■) Directorate-General for Agricultural Production; (■) Directorate-General for Agricultural and Food Industries; (■) Directorate-General for Food Policy; (■) Directorate-General for Services; (■) General Secretariat for Maritime Fisheries; (■) Directorate-General for Fisheries Management; (■) Directorate-General for International Fishing Relations					
=== Ministry of the Presidency ===
Ministry of the Presidency (Ministerio de la Presidencia)		Javier Moscoso	3 December 1982	26 July 1986	PSOE (PSOE from Jan 1983; PAD until Jan 1983)	
Ministry of the Presidency (Ministerio de la Presidencia)	24 December 1982 – 26 July 1986: (■) State Secretariat for Public Administration; (■) Directorate-General for the Civil Service; (■) Directorate-General for Organization, Procedures and Informatics; (■) Inspectorate-General for Public Administration Services; (■) Undersecretariat of the Presidency; (■) Technical General Secretariat of the Presidency; (■) Directorate-General for Services; (■) Directorate-General of the National Geographic Institute; (■) General Coordinator of the National Plan for the Toxic Syndrome (from 30 Apr 1983; disest. 1 Apr 1985); (■) General Coordinator of the National Plan for the Toxic Syndrome (until 30 Apr 1983); (■) General Secretariat of the High Council for Civil Service (est. 23 Aug 1984)					
=== Ministry of Transport, Tourism and Communications ===
Ministry of Transport, Tourism and Communications (Ministerio de Transportes, Turismo y Comunicaciones)		Enrique Barón	3 December 1982	5 July 1985	PSOE	
Ministry of Transport, Tourism and Communications (Ministerio de Transportes, Turismo y Comunicaciones)		Abel Caballero	5 July 1985	26 July 1986	PSOE	
Ministry of Transport, Tourism and Communications (Ministerio de Transportes, Turismo y Comunicaciones)	(■) Undersecretariat of Transport, Tourism and Communications; (■) General Secretariat for Tourism					
=== Ministry of Culture ===
Ministry of Culture (Ministerio de Cultura)		Javier Solana	3 December 1982	26 July 1986	PSOE	
Ministry of Culture (Ministerio de Cultura)	16 December 1982 – 1 May 1985: (■) Undersecretariat of Culture; (■) Technical General Secretariat; (■) Directorate-General for Services; (■) Directorate-General for Books and Libraries; (■) Directorate-General for Fine Arts and Archives; (■) Directorate-General for Cinematography; (■) Directorate-General for Music and Theater; (■) Directorate-General for Youth and Sociocultural Promotion; (●) High Council for Sports; (■) President's Office of the High Council for Sports; (■) General Secretariat of the High Council for Sports; (■) Directorate for Physical Culture and Sports; 1 May 1985 – 21 October 1993: (■) Undersecretariat of Culture; (■) Technical General Secretariat; (■) Directorate-General for Fine Arts and Archives; (■) Directorate-General for Books and Libraries; (■) Directorate-General for Cultural Cooperation; (●) High Council for Sports; (■) President's Office of the High Council for Sports; (■) General Secretariat of the High Council for Sports (disest. 29 Apr 1986); (■) Directorate for Physical Culture and Sports (disest. 29 Apr 1986); (■) Directorate-General of the High Council for Sports (est. 29 Apr 1986)					
=== Ministry of Territorial Administration ===
Ministry of Territorial Administration (Ministerio de Administración; Territorial)		Tomás de la Quadra-Salcedo	3 December 1982	5 July 1985	PSOE	
Ministry of Territorial Administration (Ministerio de Administración; Territorial)		Félix Pons	5 July 1985	14 July 1986 (renounced)	PSOE	
Ministry of Territorial Administration (Ministerio de Administración; Territorial)		Javier Moscoso (ordinary discharge of duties)	14 July 1986	26 July 1986	PSOE (Independent)	
Ministry of Territorial Administration (Ministerio de Administración; Territorial)	16 February 1983 – 26 July 1986: (■) State Secretariat for Autonomous Communities; (■) Directorate-General for Regional Development; (■) Directorate-General for Cooperation with the Autonomous Communities; (■) Undersecretariat of Territorial Administration; (■) Technical General Secretariat; (■) Directorate-General for Local Administration; (■) Directorate-General for Local Cooperation					
=== Ministry of Health and Consumer Affairs ===
Ministry of Health and Consumer Affairs (Ministerio de Sanidad y Consumo)		Ernest Lluch	3 December 1982	26 July 1986	PSOE (PSC–PSOE)	
Ministry of Health and Consumer Affairs (Ministerio de Sanidad y Consumo)	(■) Undersecretariat of Health and Consumer Affairs; (■) General Secretariat for Consumer Affairs					

== See also ==
- Governments of Felipe González

== Notes ==
Preceded by Calvo-Sotelo	Government of Spain; 1982–1986	Succeeded by González II
