= Second government of Felipe González =

1986–1989 government of Spain

2nd government of Felipe González
- Government of Spain
- 1986–1989
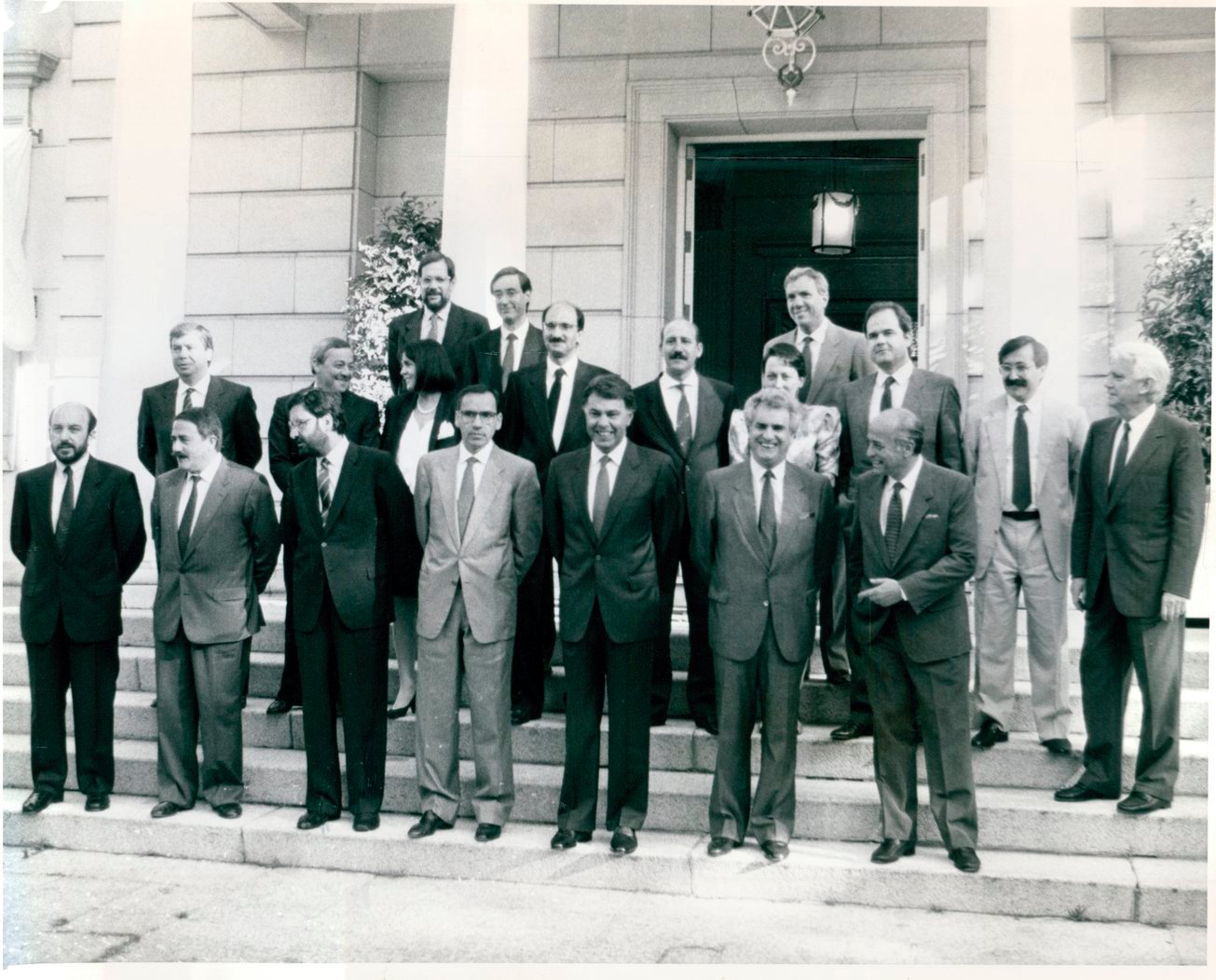
- The government in July 1988
- Date formed: 26 July 1986
- Date dissolved: 7 December 1989

People and organisations
- Monarch: Juan Carlos I
- Prime Minister: Felipe González
- Deputy Prime Minister: Alfonso Guerra
- No. of ministers: 16 (Note: Does not include the prime minister.) (1986–1988); 17 (1988–1989)
- Total no. of members: 22
- Member party: PSOE
- Status in legislature: Majority (single-party)
- Opposition party: AP–PL (1986–1987); AP (1987–1989); PP (1989)
- Opposition leader: Manuel Fraga (1986); Miguel Herrero de Miñón (1986–1987); Antonio Hernández Mancha (1987–1989)

History
- Election: 1986 general election
- Outgoing election: 1989 general election
- Legislature term: 3rd Cortes Generales
- Budget: 1987, 1988, 1989
- Predecessor: González I
- Successor: González III

The second government of Felipe González was formed on 26 July 1986, following the latter's election as prime minister of Spain by the Congress of Deputies on 23 July and his swearing-in on 24 July, as a result of the Spanish Socialist Workers' Party (PSOE) emerging as the largest parliamentary force at the 1986 Spanish general election. It succeeded the first González government and was the government of Spain from 26 July 1986 to 7 December 1989, a total of 1,230 days, or 3 years, 4 months and 11 days.

The cabinet comprised members of the PSOE (including its sister party, the Socialists' Party of Catalonia, PSC) and a number of independents. It was automatically dismissed on 30 October 1989 as a consequence of the 1989 general election, but remained in acting capacity until the next government was sworn in.

== Investiture ==
Investiture; Congress of Deputies; Nomination of Felipe González (PSOE)
Ballot →	23 July 1986
Required majority →	176 out of 350
Yes: • PSOE (184)	184 / 350
No: • AP–PL (73); • PDP (21); • CDS (19); • CiU (18); • IU (7); • EE (2); • CG (1); • PAR (1); • AIC (1); • UV (1)	144 / 350
Abstentions: • PNV (6)	6 / 350
Absentees: • AP (11); • HB (5)	16 / 350

== Votes of confidence/no confidence ==
Motion of no confidence Congress of Deputies; Nomination of Antonio Hernández Mancha (AP)
Ballot →	30 March 1987
Required majority →	176 out of 350
Yes: • AP (66); • UV (1)	67 / 350
No: • PSOE (181); • IU (6); • PNV (4); • EE (2); • AIC (1)	194 / 350
Abstentions: • PDP (20); • CiU (19); • CDS (16); • PL (9); • RD (2); • PD (2); • PAR (1); • CG (1); • Independent (1)	71 / 350
Absentees: • HB (5); • CDS (4); • PSOE (3); • EA (2); • AP (1); • PDP (1); • PL (1); • IU (1)	18 / 350

== Council of Ministers ==
The Council of Ministers was structured into the offices for the prime minister, the deputy prime minister and 15 ministries. The number of ministries was increased to 17 with the creation of the Ministry of Social Affairs and the Ministry of the Spokesperson of the Government in July 1988.

← González II Government → (26 July 1986 – 7 December 1989)
Portfolio	Name	Party	Took office	Left office	Ref.
Prime Minister	Felipe González	PSOE	24 July 1986	6 December 1989	
Deputy Prime Minister	Alfonso Guerra	PSOE	26 July 1986	7 December 1989	
Minister of Foreign Affairs	Francisco Fernández Ordóñez	PSOE	26 July 1986	7 December 1989	
Minister of Justice	Fernando Ledesma	Independent	26 July 1986	12 July 1988	
Minister of Defence	Narcís Serra	PSOE^{/PSC}	26 July 1986	7 December 1989	
Minister of Economy and Finance	Carlos Solchaga	PSOE	26 July 1986	7 December 1989	
Minister of the Interior	José Barrionuevo	PSOE	26 July 1986	12 July 1988	
Minister of Public Works and Urbanism	Javier Sáenz de Cosculluela	PSOE	26 July 1986	7 December 1989	
Minister of Education and Science	José María Maravall	PSOE	26 July 1986	12 July 1988	
Minister of Labour and Social Security	Manuel Chaves	PSOE	26 July 1986	7 December 1989	
Minister of Industry and Energy	Luis Carlos Croissier	PSOE	26 July 1986	12 July 1988	
Minister of Agriculture, Fisheries and Food	Carlos Romero	PSOE	26 July 1986	7 December 1989	
Minister for Public Administrations	Joaquín Almunia	PSOE	26 July 1986	7 December 1989	
Minister of Transport, Tourism and Communications	Abel Caballero	PSOE	26 July 1986	12 July 1988	
Minister of Culture	Javier Solana	PSOE	26 July 1986	12 July 1988	
Minister of Health and Consumer Affairs	Julián García Vargas	PSOE	26 July 1986	7 December 1989	
Minister of Relations with the Cortes and the Government Secretariat	Virgilio Zapatero	PSOE	26 July 1986	7 December 1989	
=== Changes July 1988 ===
Portfolio	Name	Party	Took office	Left office	Ref.
Minister of Justice	Enrique Múgica	PSOE	12 July 1988	7 December 1989	
Minister of the Interior	José Luis Corcuera	PSOE	12 July 1988	7 December 1989	
Minister of Education and Science	Javier Solana	PSOE	12 July 1988	7 December 1989	
Minister of Industry and Energy	Claudio Aranzadi	Independent	12 July 1988	7 December 1989	
Minister of Transport, Tourism and Communications	José Barrionuevo	PSOE	12 July 1988	7 December 1989	
Minister of Culture	Jorge Semprún	Independent	12 July 1988	7 December 1989	
Minister of Social Affairs (Note: On 12 July 1988, the Social Affairs and the Spokesperson of the Government departments were established.)	Matilde Fernández	PSOE	12 July 1988	7 December 1989	
Spokesperson Minister of the Government	Rosa Conde	Independent	12 July 1988	7 December 1989	

== Departmental structure ==
Felipe González's second government was organised into several superior and governing units, whose number, powers and hierarchical structure varied depending on the ministerial department.

Unit/body rank

- (■) Secretary of state
- (■) Undersecretary
- (■) Director-general
- (●) Autonomous agency
- (◆) Military & intelligence agency

Office (Original name)	Portrait	Name	Took office	Left office	Alliance/party	Ref.
=== Prime Minister's Office ===
Prime Minister (Presidencia del Gobierno)		Felipe González	24 July 1986	6 December 1989	PSOE	
Prime Minister (Presidencia del Gobierno)	26 July – 4 September 1986: (■) Office of the Spokesperson of the Government; (■) General Secretariat of the Office of the Spokesperson of the Government; (■) Directorate-General for Information Relations; (■) Directorate-General for Information Cooperation; (■) Cabinet of the Prime Minister's Office–Chief of Staff; (■) Deputy Chief of Staff; (■) Secretariat of the Prime Minister's Office; (■) Chief of Protocol of the State; (■) Chief of Security of the Prime Minister's Office; (■) Chief of Operational Resources of the Prime Minister's Office; (■) General Secretariat of the Prime Minister's Office; (■) Directorate-General for Social Communication Media; (■) Directorate-General of the Centre for Sociological Research; 4 September 1986 – 16 December 1989: (■) Office of the Spokesperson of the Government (disest. 30 Jul 1988); (■) General Secretariat of the Office of the Spokesperson of the Government (disest. 30 Jul 1988); (■) Directorate-General for Information Relations (until 30 Jul 1988); (■) Directorate-General for Information Cooperation (until 30 Jul 1988); (■) Cabinet of the Prime Minister's Office–Chief of Staff; (■) Deputy Chief of Staff; (■) Department of Infrastructure and Monitoring for Crisis Situations (est. 7 Feb 1987); (■) General Secretariat of the Prime Minister's Office; (■) Chief of Protocol of the State; (■) Chief of Protocol of the Prime Minister's Office (est. 31 Jan 1987); (■) Chief of Security of the Prime Minister's Office; (■) Chief of Operational Resources of the Prime Minister's Office					
Deputy Prime Minister (Vicepresidencia del Gobierno)		Alfonso Guerra	26 July 1986	7 December 1989	PSOE	
Deputy Prime Minister (Vicepresidencia del Gobierno)	24 December 1982 – 16 December 1989: (■) Secretariat of the Deputy Prime Minister's Office					
=== Ministry of Foreign Affairs ===
Ministry of Foreign Affairs (Ministerio de Asuntos Exteriores)		Francisco Fernández Ordóñez	26 July 1986	7 December 1989	PSOE	
Ministry of Foreign Affairs (Ministerio de Asuntos Exteriores)	29 August 1985 – 24 December 1988: (■) State Secretariat for the European Communities; (■) General Secretariat for the European Communities; (■) Directorate-General for Community Technical Coordination; (■) Directorate-General for Community Legal and Institutional Coordination; (■) State Secretariat for International Cooperation and for Ibero-America; (■) Directorate-General for Cultural Relations; (■) Directorate-General for International Technical Coordination; (■) Directorate-General for International Economic Relations; (■) Undersecretariat of Foreign Affairs; (■) Technical General Secretariat; (■) Directorate-General for the Foreign Service; (■) Directorate-General for Consular Affairs; (■) General Secretariat for Foreign Policy; (■) Directorate-General for Foreign Policy for Europe; (■) Directorate-General for Foreign Policy for Ibero-America; (■) Directorate-General for Foreign Policy for North America and Asia; (■) Directorate-General for Foreign Policy for Africa and the Middle East; (■) Directorate-General for International Organizations and Conferences; (■) Directorate-General for International Affairs of Security and Disarmament; (■) Service for Protocol, Chancery and Orders–First Introducer of Ambassadors; (■) Directorate-General of the Office for Diplomatic Information; 24 December 1988 – 11 May 1996: (■) State Secretariat for the European Communities; (■) General Secretariat for the European Communities; (■) Directorate-General for Community Technical Coordination; (■) Directorate-General for Community Legal and Institutional Coordination; (■) State Secretariat for International Cooperation and for Ibero-America; (■) Directorate-General for International Economic Relations; (■) Directorate-General for Cultural and Scientific Relations; (■) Undersecretariat of Foreign Affairs; (■) Technical General Secretariat; (■) Directorate-General for the Foreign Service; (■) Directorate-General for Consular Affairs; (■) General Secretariat for Foreign Policy; (■) Directorate-General for Foreign Policy for Europe; (■) Directorate-General for Foreign Policy for Ibero-America; (■) Directorate-General for Foreign Policy for North America and Asia; (■) Directorate-General for Foreign Policy for Africa and the Middle East; (■) Directorate-General for International Organizations and Conferences; (■) Directorate-General for International Affairs of Security and Disarmament; (■) Service for Protocol, Chancery and Orders–First Introducer of Ambassadors; (■) Directorate-General of the Office for Diplomatic Information					
=== Ministry of Justice ===
Ministry of Justice (Ministerio de Justicia)		Fernando Ledesma	26 July 1986	12 July 1988	PSOE (Independent)	
Ministry of Justice (Ministerio de Justicia)		Enrique Múgica	12 July 1988	7 December 1989	PSOE	
Ministry of Justice (Ministerio de Justicia)	17 August 1985 – 17 January 1991: (■) Undersecretariat of Justice; (■) Technical General Secretariat; (■) Directorate-General for Services; (■) Directorate-General for Relations with the Administration of Justice; (■) Directorate-General for Religious Affairs; (■) Directorate-General for Registries and Notaries; (■) Directorate-General for Penitentiary Institutions; (■) Directorate-General of the State Legal Service; (■) Directorate-General for the Legal Protection of Minors (until 23 Jul 1988)					
=== Ministry of Defence ===
Ministry of Defence (Ministerio de Defensa)		Narcís Serra	26 July 1986	7 December 1989	PSOE (PSC–PSOE)	
=== Ministry of Economy and Finance ===
Ministry of Economy and Finance (Ministerio de Economía y Hacienda)		Carlos Solchaga	26 July 1986	7 December 1989	PSOE	
Ministry of Economy and Finance (Ministerio de Economía y Hacienda)	9 February 1984 – 22 February 1987: (■) State Secretariat for Finance; (■) General Secretariat for Finance; (■) Office of the Comptroller General of the State Administration; (■) Directorate-General for Customs and Special Taxes; (■) Directorate-General for Financial and Tax Inspection; (■) Inspectorate-General of the Ministry of Economy and Finance; (■) Directorate-General for Taxes; (■) Directorate-General for Budgets; (■) Directorate-General for Personnel Expenditures; (■) Directorate-General for Coordination with the Territorial Treasuries; (■) State Secretariat for Economy and Planning; (■) General Secretariat for Economy and Planning; (■) Directorate-General for Economic Policy; (■) Directorate-General for Forecast and Conjuncture; (■) Directorate-General for Planning; (■) Directorate-General for Plan Coordination; (■) Directorate-General for the National Institute of Statistics; (■) Directorate-General for the Treasury and Financial Policy; (■) Directorate-General for Insurance; (■) State Secretariat for Trade; (■) General Secretariat for Trade; (■) Directorate-General for Trade Policy; (■) Directorate-General for Tariff Policy and Imports; (■) Directorate-General for Exports; (■) Directorate-General for Foreign Transactions; (■) Directorate-General for Internal Trade; (■) Undersecretariat of Economy and Finance; (■) Directorate-General for Services; (■) Technical General Secretariat; (■) Directorate-General for State Litigation; (■) Directorate-General for the State Heritage; 22 February 1987 – 13 March 1991: (■) State Secretariat for Finance; (■) General Secretariat for Finance; (■) Directorate-General for Tax Management; (■) Directorate-General for Financial and Tax Inspection; (■) Directorate-General for Tax Collection; (■) Directorate-General for Customs and Special Taxes; (■) Directorate-General for Tax Informatics; (■) General Secretariat for Planning and Budgets; (■) Directorate-General for Planning; (■) Directorate-General for Budgets; (■) Office of the Comptroller General of the State Administration; (■) Directorate-General of the Budget Information Centre and the Plan (disest. 9 Mar 1989); (■) Directorate-General for Budget Informatics (est. 9 Mar 1989); (■) Directorate-General for Personnel Expenditures and Public Pensions; (■) Directorate-General for Taxes; (■) Directorate-General for Coordination with the Territorial Treasuries; (■) State Secretariat for Economy; (■) Directorate-General for Economic Policy; (■) Directorate-General for Forecast and Conjuncture; (■) Directorate-General for the Treasury and Financial Policy; (■) Directorate-General for Insurance; (■) Directorate-General for the National Institute of Statistics (disest. 24 Jul 1989); (■) Directorate-General for Regional Economic Incentives; (■) State Secretariat for Trade; (■) General Secretariat for Trade; (■) Directorate-General for Trade Policy; (■) Directorate-General for Foreign Trade; (■) Directorate-General for Foreign Transactions; (■) Directorate-General for Internal Trade; (■) Directorate-General for Competition Defence; (■) Undersecretariat of Economy and Finance; (■) Directorate-General for Services; (■) Technical General Secretariat; (■) Directorate-General for the State Heritage; (■) Inspectorate-General of the Ministry of Economy and Finance					
=== Ministry of the Interior ===
Ministry of the Interior (Ministerio del Interior)		José Barrionuevo	26 July 1986	12 July 1988	PSOE	
Ministry of the Interior (Ministerio del Interior)		José Luis Corcuera	12 July 1988	7 December 1989	PSOE	
=== Ministry of Public Works and Urbanism ===
Ministry of Public Works and Urbanism (Ministerio de Obras Públicas y Urbanismo)		Javier Sáenz de Cosculluela	26 July 1986	7 December 1989	PSOE	
Ministry of Public Works and Urbanism (Ministerio de Obras Públicas y Urbanismo)	(■) Directorate-General of the National Geographic Institute					
=== Ministry of Education and Science ===
Ministry of Education and Science (Ministerio de Educación y Ciencia)		José María Maravall	26 July 1986	12 July 1988	PSOE	
Ministry of Education and Science (Ministerio de Educación y Ciencia)		Javier Solana	12 July 1988	7 December 1989	PSOE	
Ministry of Education and Science (Ministerio de Educación y Ciencia)	(●) High Council for Sports (from 12 Jul 1988); (■) President's Office of the High Council for Sports (from 12 Jul 1988); (■) Directorate-General of the High Council for Sports (from 12 Jul 1988; disest. 9 Dec 1988); (■) Directorate-General for Sports (est. 9 Dec 1988); (■) Directorate-General for Sports Infrastructure (est. 9 Dec 1988)					
=== Ministry of Labour and Social Security ===
Ministry of Labour and Social Security (Ministerio de Trabajo y Seguridad Social)		Manuel Chaves	26 July 1986	7 December 1989	PSOE	
Ministry of Labour and Social Security (Ministerio de Trabajo y Seguridad Social)	25 April 1985 – 14 July 1993: (■) Undersecretariat of Labour and Social Security; (■) Technical General Secretariat; (■) Directorate-General for Services; (■) Directorate-General for Personnel; (■) Directorate-General for Labour and Social Security Inspection; (■) Directorate-General for Informatics and Statistics; (■) Directorate-General of the Spanish Institute for Emigration; (■) General Secretariat for Employment and Labour Relations; (■) Directorate-General for Labour; (■) Directorate-General for Employment; (■) Directorate-General for Cooperatives and Labour Relations; (■) General Secretariat for Social Security; (■) Directorate-General for Economic Regime of the Social Security; (■) Directorate-General for Social Action (until 23 Jul 1988); (■) Directorate-General for Legal Regime of the Social Security; (■) Office of the Comptroller General of the Social Security					
=== Ministry of Industry and Energy ===
Ministry of Industry and Energy (Ministerio de Industria y Energía)		Luis Carlos Croissier	26 July 1986	12 July 1988	PSOE	
Ministry of Industry and Energy (Ministerio de Industria y Energía)		Claudio Aranzadi	12 July 1988	7 December 1989	PSOE (Independent)	
Ministry of Industry and Energy (Ministerio de Industria y Energía)	16 December 1982 – 30 October 1988: (■) Undersecretariat of Industry and Energy; (■) General Secretariat for Energy and Mineral Resources; (■) Directorate-General for Mines; (■) Directorate-General for Energy; (■) Technical General Secretariat; (■) Directorate-General for Steel and Naval Industries; (■) Directorate-General for Chemical, Construction, Textile and Pharmaceutical Industries; (■) Directorate-General for Electronics and Informatics; (■) Directorate-General for Food Industries and the Small and Medium-sized Industry; (■) Directorate-General for Industrial Innovation and Technology; (■) Directorate-General for Services; 30 October 1988 – 13 March 1991: (■) Undersecretariat of Industry and Energy; (■) Technical General Secretariat; (■) Directorate-General for Services; (■) General Secretariat for Energy and Mineral Resources; (■) Directorate-General for Mines and Construction; (■) Directorate-General for Energy; (■) General Secretariat for Industrial Promotion and Technology; (■) Directorate-General for Electronics and New Technologies; (■) Directorate-General for Technological Policy; (■) Directorate-General for Industry					
=== Ministry of Agriculture, Fisheries and Food ===
Ministry of Agriculture, Fisheries and Food (Ministerio de Agricultura, Pesca y Alimentación)		Carlos Romero	26 July 1986	7 December 1989	PSOE	
=== Ministry for Public Administrations ===
Ministry for Public Administrations (Ministerio para las Administraciones; Públicas)		Joaquín Almunia	26 July 1986	7 December 1989	PSOE	
Ministry for Public Administrations (Ministerio para las Administraciones; Públicas)	(■) State Secretariat for Public Administration; (■) Directorate-General for the Civil Service; (■) Directorate-General for Organization, Procedures and Information Technology; (■) Inspectorate-General for Public Administration Services					
=== Ministry of Transport, Tourism and Communications ===
Ministry of Transport, Tourism and Communications (Ministerio de Transportes, Turismo y Comunicaciones)		Abel Caballero	26 July 1986	12 July 1988	PSOE	
Ministry of Transport, Tourism and Communications (Ministerio de Transportes, Turismo y Comunicaciones)		José Barrionuevo	12 July 1988	7 December 1989	PSOE	
=== Ministry of Culture ===
Ministry of Culture (Ministerio de Cultura)		Javier Solana	26 July 1986	12 July 1988	PSOE	
Ministry of Culture (Ministerio de Cultura)		Jorge Semprún	12 July 1988	7 December 1989	PSOE (Independent)	
Ministry of Culture (Ministerio de Cultura)	1 May 1985 – 21 October 1993: (■) Undersecretariat of Culture; (■) Technical General Secretariat; (■) Directorate-General for Fine Arts and Archives; (■) Directorate-General for Books and Libraries; (■) Directorate-General for Cultural Cooperation; (●) High Council for Sports (until 12 Jul 1988); (■) President's Office of the High Council for Sports (until 12 Jul 1988); (■) Directorate-General of the High Council for Sports (until 12 Jul 1988)					
=== Ministry of Health and Consumer Affairs ===
Ministry of Health and Consumer Affairs (Ministerio de Sanidad y Consumo)		Julián García Vargas	26 July 1986	7 December 1989	PSOE	
=== Ministry of Relations with the Cortes and the Government Secretariat ===
Ministry of Relations with the Cortes and the Government; Secretariat (Ministerio de Relaciones con las Cortes y de la Secretaría del Gobierno)		Virgilio Zapatero	26 July 1986	7 December 1989	PSOE	
Ministry of Relations with the Cortes and the Government; Secretariat (Ministerio de Relaciones con las Cortes y de la Secretaría del Gobierno)	26 July – 26 September 1986: (■) Undersecretariat of Relations with the Cortes and the Government Secretariat; (■) Technical General Secretariat; (■) Directorate-General for Services; (■) Directorate-General for Relations with the Congress of Deputies; (■) Directorate-General for Relations with the Senate; (■) Directorate-General for Social Communication Media (from 4 Sep 1986); (■) Directorate-General of the Centre for Sociological Research (from 4 Sep 1986); 26 September 1986 – 31 July 1987: (■) Undersecretariat of Relations with the Cortes and the Government Secretariat; (■) Technical General Secretariat; (■) Directorate-General for Services; (■) Directorate-General for Relations with the Cortes; (■) Directorate-General for Monitoring of Parliamentary Initiatives; (■) Directorate-General of the Government Secretariat; (■) Directorate-General for Social Communication Media; (■) Directorate-General of the Centre for Sociological Research; 31 July 1987 – 14 July 1993: (■) Undersecretariat of Relations with the Cortes and the Government Secretariat; (■) Directorate-General for Relations with the Cortes; (■) Directorate-General for Monitoring of Parliamentary Initiatives; (■) Directorate-General of the Government Secretariat; (■) Technical General Secretariat; (■) Directorate-General for Services; (■) Directorate-General of the Centre for Sociological Research; (■) Directorate-General for Social Communication Media					
=== Ministry of Social Affairs ===
Ministry of Social Affairs (Ministerio de Asuntos Sociales) (from 12 July 1988)		Matilde Fernández	12 July 1988	7 December 1989	PSOE	
Ministry of Social Affairs (Ministerio de Asuntos Sociales) (from 12 July 1988)	23 July 1988 – 14 July 1993: (■) Undersecretariat of Social Affairs; (■) Technical Directorate-General and for Services; (■) Directorate-General for Social Action; (■) Directorate-General for the Legal Protection of Minors					
=== Ministry of the Spokesperson of the Government ===
Ministry of the Spokesperson of the Government (Ministerio del Portavoz del Gobierno) (from 12 July 1988)		Rosa Conde	12 July 1988	7 December 1989	PSOE (Independent)	
Ministry of the Spokesperson of the Government (Ministerio del Portavoz del Gobierno) (from 12 July 1988)	30 July 1988 – 6 September 1993: (■) Undersecretariat of the Spokesperson of the Government; (■) Technical Directorate-General and for Services; (■) Directorate-General for Information Relations; (■) Directorate-General for Information Cooperation					

== See also ==
- Governments of Felipe González

== Notes ==
Preceded by González I	Government of Spain; 1986–1989	Succeeded by González III
