= Francisco Luzón =

Spanish banker and economist (1948–2021)

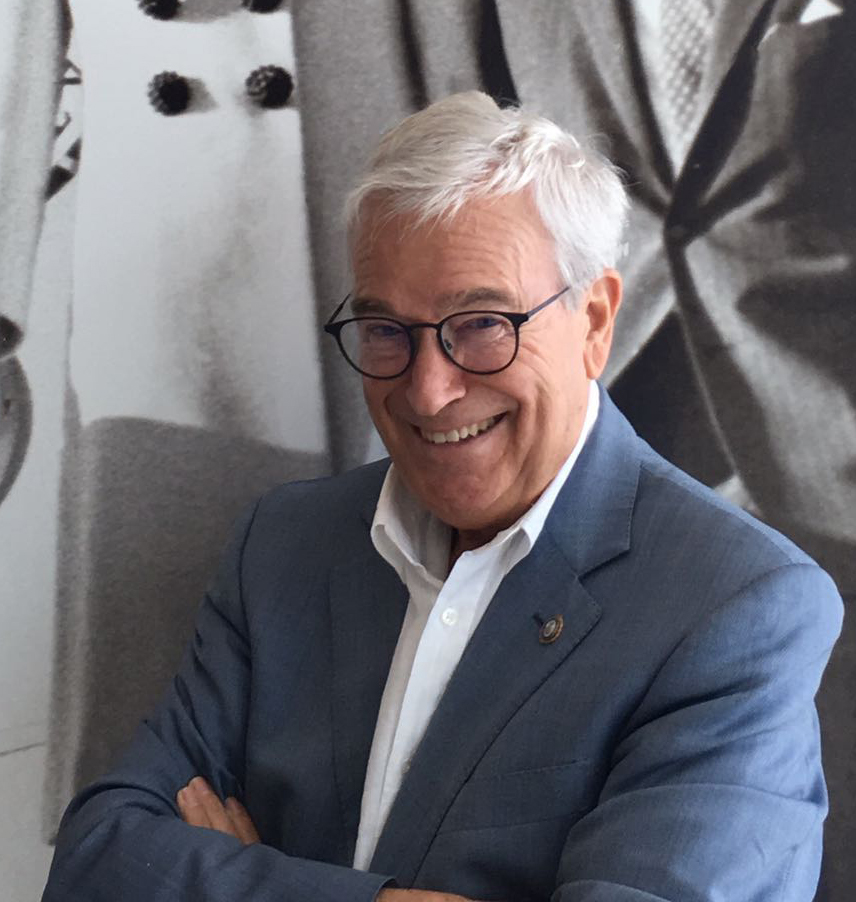
- Born: Francisco Luzón López; 1 January 1948; El Cañavate, Spain
- Died: 17 February 2021 (aged 73); Madrid, Spain
- Occupations: Banker; Economist
- Website: www.ffluzon.org

Francisco Luzón López (1 January 1948 – 17 February 2021) was a Spanish banker and economist. He assisted in transforming Spanish and Latin American banking over the last thirty years, leading banks such as Banco Bilbao Vizcaya Argentaria and Banco Santander. Luzón was diagnosed with ALS in October 2013 and created the Fundación Francisco Luzón to fund ALS research.

== Biography ==
Luzón was born into a modest family in El Cañavate in the Province of Cuenca. He attended the College of Business and Economics at the University of the Basque Country on a merit scholarship. His career began at Banco de Vizcaya in 1972, where he worked in various branches across Spain. He achieved various high-ranking international positions within the bank until he became Director in 1987. In 1988, he oversaw the merger between Banco de Vizcaya and Banco de Bilbao, which formed the Banco Bilbao Vizcaya Argentaria and saw Luzón as its first director.

In 1989, Minister of Economy and Finance Carlos Solchaga appointed Luzón to lead the Banco Exterior de España, succeeding Miguel Boyer, thanks to his experience in the banking sector of Spain. In 1991, he became President of Argentaria, which merged six different banks across Spain. From 1993 to 1998, it went through a process of privatization and increased in value by 800 billion pesetas. In 1996, he became Director of the Banco Santander and served as General Deputy Director to its President, Emilio Botín. In January 1999, the bank was merged with the Banco Central Hispano to form the Banco Santander Central Hispano. While at Banco Santander, he expanded the bank into Latin America, where it had locations in 10 different countries and absorbed numerous other Latin American banks.

Throughout his professional career, Luzón was heavily active in foundations and organizations which supported research and education as a way to promote social development and advancement. He served as President of the Fundación Banco Exterior de España and the Fundación Argentaria, and was a trustee of the Fundación Princesa de Asturias, the Fundación de Ayuda contra la Drogadicción, and the Fundación Kovacs. He served as President of the Social Council of the University of Castilla–La Mancha from 1996 to 2008. With expansion of the Banco Santander in Latin America, he helped oversee the implementation of Universia, which was a network of Spanish-speaking universities. He signed over 700 agreements within the network and added over 19 million students and teachers. At the same time, he promoted Fudis, a program dedicated to training professional talent in Latin America, which helped 350 students access positions at the executive level.

Luzón retired from the Banco Santander Central Hispano in 2013, receiving a pension of 65 million euros. He then dedicated himself to the academic world, becoming a professor at the China Europe International Business School in Shanghai. He also served as Vice-President of the Biblioteca Nacional de España and was President of the Catholic Institute of Business Administration. He served on the Latin American Council at Georgetown University and was a member of the Global Advisory Council of the School of Management at Yale University. He was a consultant with the Inter-American Development Bank and the European Stability Mechanism, while also serving as an advisor to the Government of Puerto Rico thanks to his contributions in the Caribbean and Latin America.

On 14 November 2011, he received the Medal of Merit in Labour, awarded by the Council of Ministers and the Ministry of Labour, for his forty year career of professional work. On 21 June of that year, he earned a Doctoris honoris causa from the University of Castilla–La Mancha thanks to his contributions to academics. He received recognition from the Empresarial de América Latina in 2016 thanks to his contributions to the public and private spheres in Latin America. On 9 December 2016, he received the Grand Cross of the Civil Order of Alfonso X, the Wise for his merit in the fields of education and research.

Francisco Luzón died from amyotrophic lateral sclerosis in Madrid on 17 February 2021 at the age of 73.
