= Fernando Ledesma =

Fernando Ledesma may refer to:

- Fernando Ledesma (politician) (born 1939), Spanish politician
- Fernando Ledesma (footballer) (born 1992), Argentine footballer
