= Luzon (surname) =

Luzon is a surname. Notable people with this surname include:

- Avraham Luzon (born 1955), Israeli football executive
- Francisco Luzón (1948–2021), Spanish economist
- Guy Luzon (born 1975), Israeli former footballer and manager
- Javier Moreno Luzón (born 1967), Spanish historian
- Omri Luzon (born 1999), Israeli footballer
- Yaniv Luzon (born 1981), Israeli footballer

== See also ==
- Manila Luzon (stage name for Karl Philip Michael Westerberg), American drag queen
