= Majo (disambiguation) =

A majo is a male member of the lower class of Spanish society in the 18th and 19th centuries.

Majo may also refer to:

- ×Canmea 'Majo', an intergeneric hybrid cultivar of the nothogenus xCanmea in the Bromeliad family

== People with the name ==
- Giuseppe de Majo (1697-1771), Italian composer and organist
- Gian Francesco de Majo (1732-1770), Italian composer active during the mid to late 1700s
- Joan Majó (born 1938), Spanish politician
- Montserrat Majo (born 1959), Spanish swimmer who competed in the 1976 Summer Olympics
- Majo Aguilar (born 1994), Spanish singer and songwriter from Mexico

== See also ==
- Maja (disambiguation)
