= Tomás de la Quadra-Salcedo =

Spanish politician

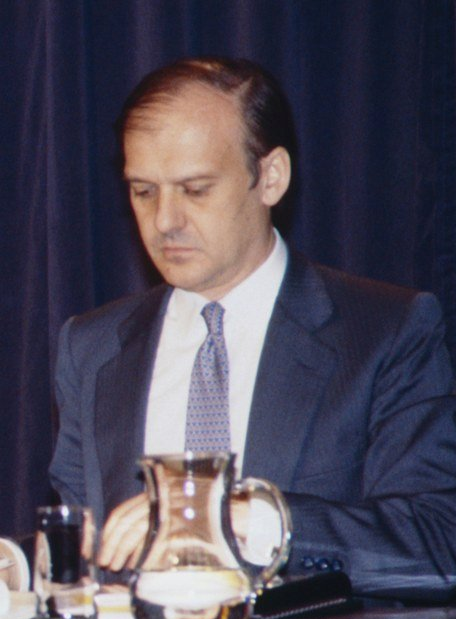

Minister of Justice
- In office 13 March 1991 – 14 July 1993
- Prime Minister: Felipe González
- Preceded by: Enrique Múgica
- Succeeded by: Juan Alberto Belloch

Minister of Territorial Administration
- In office 3 December 1982 – 5 July 1985
- Prime Minister: Felipe González
- Preceded by: Luis Cosculluela
- Succeeded by: Félix Pons

Personal details
- Born: Tomás de la Quadra-Salcedo Fernández del Castillo; 2 January 1946 (age 80) Madrid, Spain
- Party: Spanish Socialist Workers' Party
- Education: Complutense University of Madrid

Tomás de la Quadra-Salcedo Fernández del Castillo (born 2 January 1946) is a Spanish politician who served as Minister of Territorial Administration from December 1982 to July 1985 and as Minister of Justice from March 1991 to July 1993.
