= Pedro Solbes =

Spanish economist and politician (1942–2023)

Pedro Solbes Mira
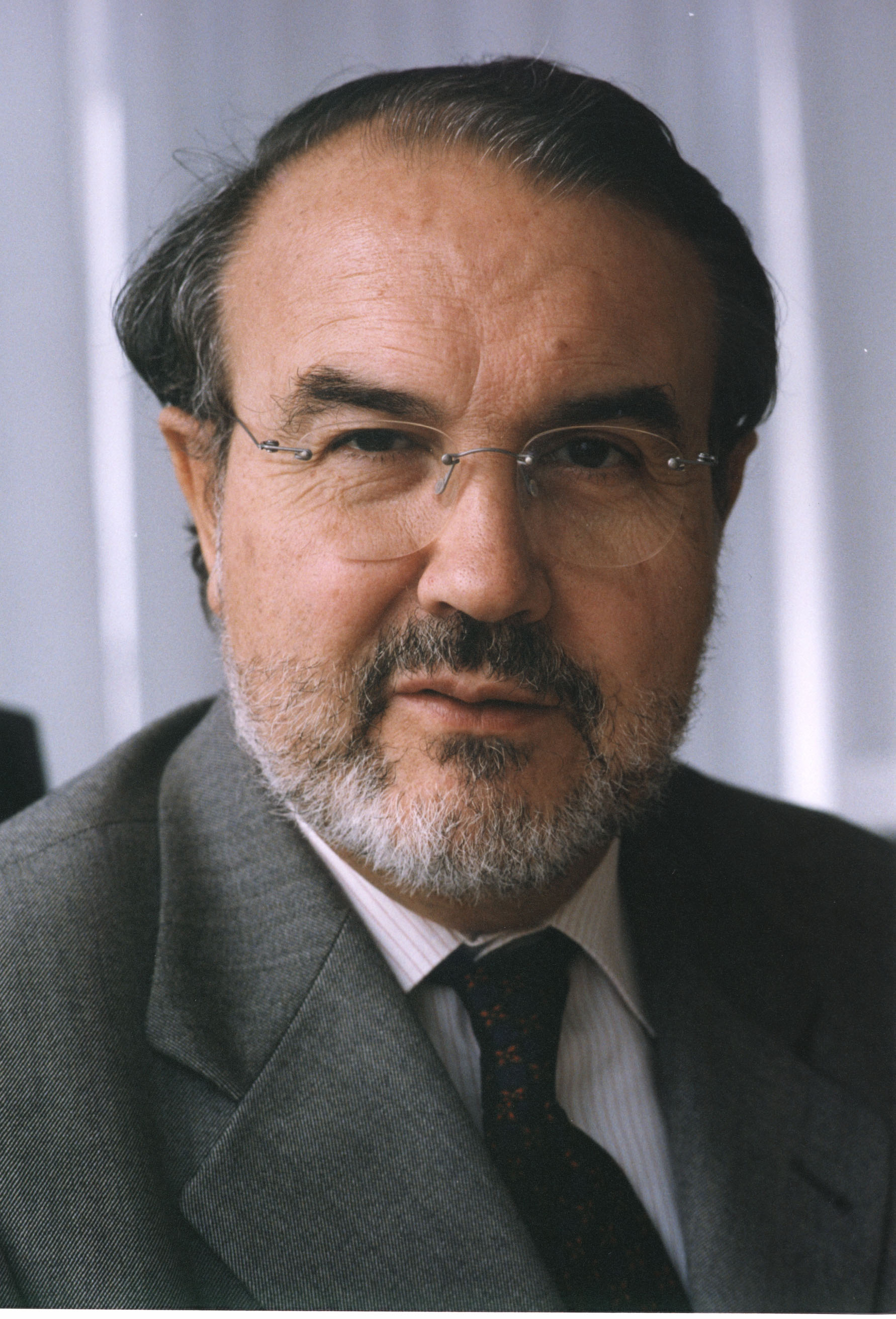
- Solbes in 1999

Second Deputy Prime Minister of Spain
- In office 18 April 2004 – 7 April 2009
- Prime Minister: José Luis Rodríguez Zapatero
- Preceded by: Javier Arenas
- Succeeded by: Elena Salgado

Minister of Economy and Finance of Spain
- In office 18 April 2004 – 7 April 2009
- Prime Minister: José Luis Rodríguez Zapatero
- Preceded by: Rodrigo Rato
- Succeeded by: Elena Salgado
- In office 13 July 1993 – 5 May 1996
- Prime Minister: Felipe González
- Preceded by: Carlos Solchaga
- Succeeded by: Rodrigo Rato

European Commissioner for Economic and Monetary Affairs
- In office 16 September 1999 – 10 April 2004
- Preceded by: Leon Brittan
- Succeeded by: Joaquín Almunia

Personal details
- Born: Pedro Solbes Mira; 31 August 1942 Pinoso (Alicante), Spain
- Died: 18 March 2023 (aged 80) Madrid, Spain
- Party: Spanish Socialist Workers' Party
- Spouse: Pilar Castro
- Education: Complutense University of Madrid
- Profession: Economist

Pedro Solbes Mira (31 August 1942 – 18 March 2023) was a Spanish economist. He was the president of FRIDE, Madrid-based think tank.

== Life and career ==
Solbes was born in Pinoso on 31 August 1942.

While independent in the sense of not being affiliated to any party, his various ministerial roles in Spain were always within Socialist Workers' Party cabinets.

From 1985 to 1991, he was the third 3rd secretary of state for the European Communities. He was agriculture and fisheries minister (1991–1993) and finance minister (1993–1996) in Felipe González's cabinets, also an MP representing Alicante for the same party until 1999.

Appointed by Spanish premier José María Aznar (of the main competing party, the People's Party), Solbes was a European commissioner for economic and monetary affairs in the European Commission presided over by Romano Prodi (the Prodi Commission).

Then Solbes served as second vice president and minister of economy and finance in the government of José Luis Rodríguez Zapatero, which he held from 2004 to 2009.

Solbes died from cancer on 18 March 2023, at the age of 80.

== Other activities ==
- African Development Bank (AfDB), ex-officio member of the Board of Governors (2004–2009)
- Asian Development Bank (ADB), ex-officio member of the Board of Governors (2004–2009)
- European Bank for Reconstruction and Development (EBRD), ex-officio member of the Board of Governors (2004-2009)
- European Investment Bank (EIB), ex-officio member of the Board of Governors (2004–2009)

== Decorations ==
- Collar of the Order of Civil Merit (24 April 2009)
- Grand Cross of the Order of Charles III (10 May 1996)
- Commander by Number of the Order of Isabella the Catholic (30 May 1985)

Political offices
Preceded by Carlos Romero	Minister of Agriculture; 1991–1993	Succeeded by Vicente Albero
Preceded by Carlos Solchaga	Minister of Economy and Finance; 1993–1996	Succeeded by Rodrigo Rato
Preceded by Isabel Tocino (Joint Commission for the European Communities)	President of the Joint Congress-Senate Committee on the European Union; 1996–1999	Succeeded by Josep Borrell
Preceded by Leon Brittan	European Commissioner for Economic and Monetary Affairs; 1999–2004	Succeeded by Joaquín Almunia
Preceded by Javier Arenas	Second Deputy Prime Minister of Spain; 2004–2009	Succeeded by Elena Salgado
Preceded by Rodrigo Rato	Minister of Economy and Finance; 2004–2009	Succeeded by Elena Salgado
