= Joan Majó =

Spanish politician

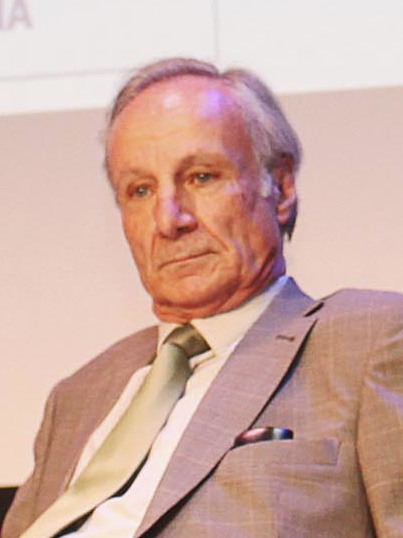

Minister of Industry and Energy
- In office 5 July 1985 – 26 July 1986
- Prime Minister: Felipe González
- Preceded by: Carlos Solchaga
- Succeeded by: Luis Carlos Croissier

Personal details
- Born: Joan Majó i Cruzate; 1939 (age 86–87) Mataró, Spain
- Party: Socialists' Party of Catalonia
- Education: Polytechnic University of Catalonia

Joan Majó i Cruzate (born 19 June 1938) is a Spanish politician who served as minister of industry and energy from July 1985 to July 1986.
