= Elena Arnedo =

Spanish gynecologist and writer (1941–2015)

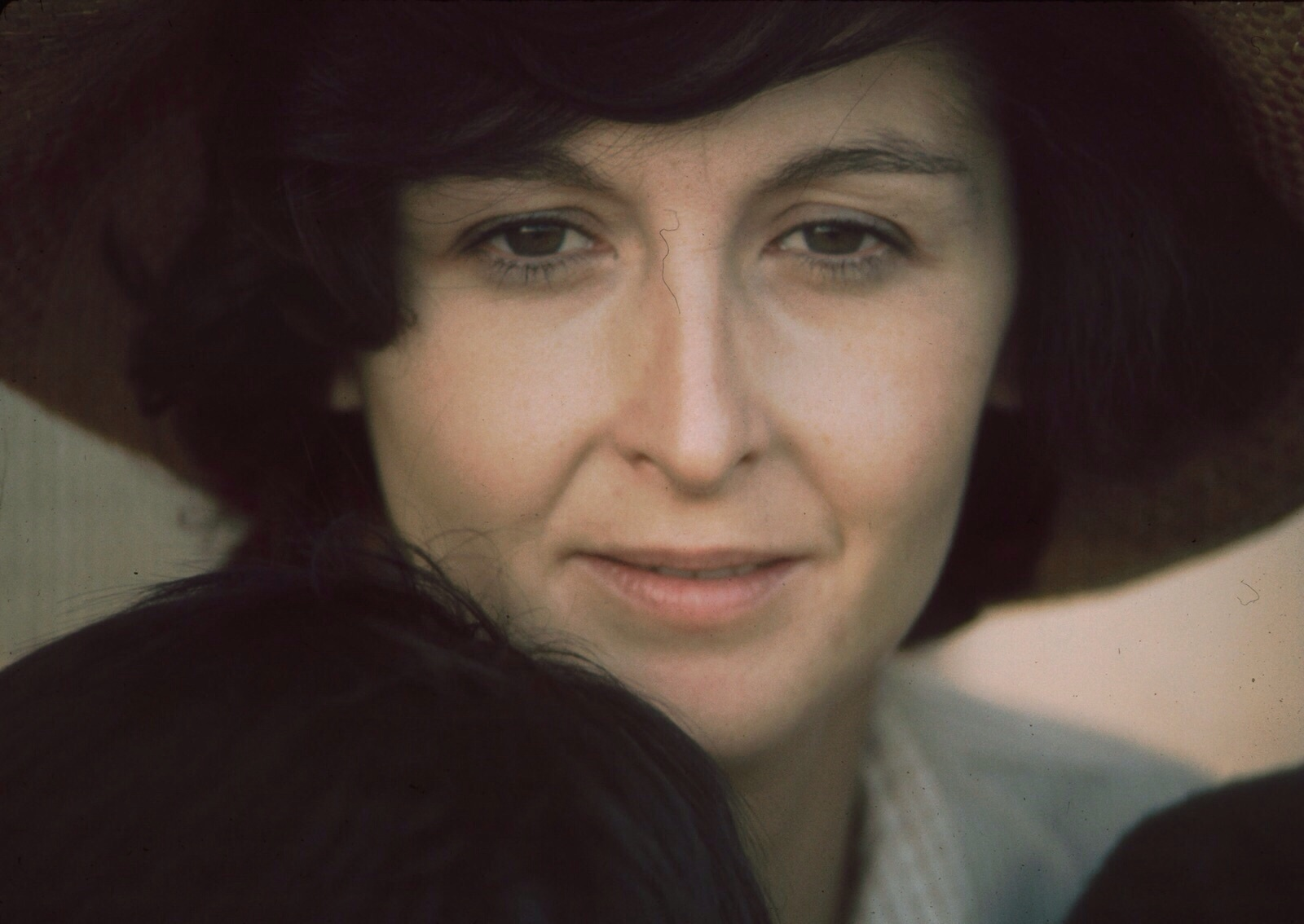
- Arnedo in 1968
- Born: Elena Arnedo Soriano; 25 November 1941; Madrid, Spain
- Died: 7 September 2015 (aged 73); Madrid, Spain
- Spouse: Miguel Boyer (m. 1964; div. 1985) Fernando Terán Troyano
- Children: 2

Elena Arnedo Soriano (25 November 1941 – 7 September 2015) was a Spanish gynecologist, writer, and women's rights activist.

== Biography ==
The daughter of feminist writer Elena Soriano, Arnedo was born in Madrid. Arnedo was the cousin of Leopoldo Calvo-Sotelo. She married economist Miguel Boyer in 1964. With him, she had two children, Laura and Miguel. She subsequently studied gynecology and breast pathology at University of Strasbourg. She divorced Boyer in 1985 and remarried academic Fernando Terán Troyano. A pioneer in reproductive rights, she wrote several books, including Testamento materno, which dealt with the ravages of drugs in connection with the death of a son. She was a critic of a drug industry that reaps great benefits selling an illusion of eternal youth. She also edited the Spanish version of the reference book El gran libro de la mujer (The Big Book of Women), about various things related to women. In 2003, she was elected a city councillor for Madrid on the Spanish Socialist Workers' Party ticket. She resigned in 2007.

Arnedo had cancer for eight years before dying on 7 September 2015 at the age of 74.

== Work ==
- 2009, Women and socialism in the book The feminist movement in Spain in the 70s, Ed. Cátedra
- 2003, the bite of the horsefly. Women in the face of age changes. Ed Aguilar
- 2000, the feminine donjuanismo. Ed. Atalaya
- 1997, The great book of the woman. Ed. Today's Topics
