= Jaime García Añoveros =

Spanish politician (1932–2000)

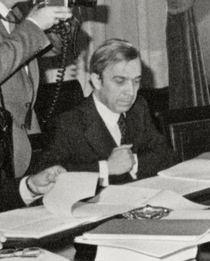

Minister of Finance
- In office 6 April 1979 – 3 December 1982
- Prime Minister: Adolfo Suárez; Leopoldo Calvo-Sotelo
- Preceded by: Francisco Fernández Ordóñez
- Succeeded by: Miguel Boyer

Personal details
- Born: Jaime Julián García Añoveros; 24 January 1932 Teruel, Spain
- Died: 15 March 2000 (aged 68) Seville, Spain
- Party: UCD
- Education: University of Valencia; University of Bologna

Jaime Julián García Añoveros (24 January 1932 – 15 March 2000) was a Spanish politician from the Union of the Democratic Centre (UCD) who served as Minister of Finance from April 1979 to December 1982.
