= Julián Campo =

Spanish politician (born 1938)

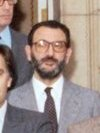

Minister of Public Works and Urbanism
- In office 3 December 1982 – 5 July 1985
- Prime Minister: Felipe González
- Preceded by: Luis Ortiz González
- Succeeded by: Javier Sáenz de Cosculluela

Personal details
- Born: Julián Campo Sainz de Rozas; 19 June 1938 (age 88) Getxo, Spain
- Party: Spanish Socialist Workers' Party
- Education: Complutense University of Madrid

Julián Campo Sainz de Rozas (born 19 June 1938) is a Spanish politician who served as Minister of Public Works and Urbanism from December 1982 to July 1985.
