= Josep Maria Pons Irazazábal =

Spanish diplomat

Josep Maria Pons Irazazábal (born 12 April 1948 in Palma) is a Spanish diplomat. He was the president of RCD Mallorca from 8 July to 27 September 2010. From 28 June 2008 to 23 July 2010 was the Spanish ambassador in Austria, ceased as a precautionary measure after being wrongfully accused of sexual harassment. He has been the Spanish ambassador to Netherlands, Denmark and Lithuania. His brother Félix Pons, who died of cancer on 2 July 2010, was a Spanish politician who was the president of Congress of Deputies from 1986 to 1996.
