= Miguel Boyer =

Spanish economist and politician (1939–2014)

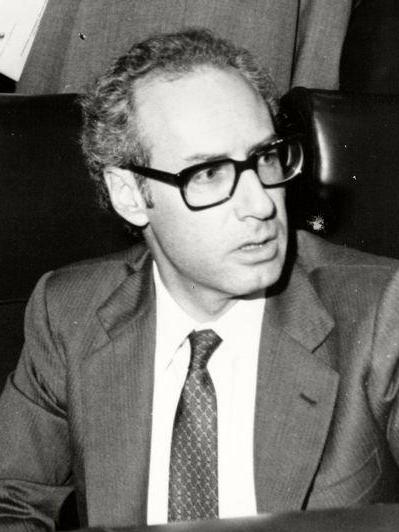
- Boyer in 1983

Minister of Economy, Treasury and Commerce
- In office 1 December 1982 – 6 July 1985
- Prime Minister: Felipe González
- Preceded by: Jaime García Añoveros
- Succeeded by: Carlos Solchaga

Personal details
- Born: Miguel Boyer Salvador; 5 February 1939 St. Jean de Luz, France
- Died: 29 September 2014 (aged 75) Madrid, Spain
- Party: Socialist Party
- Spouse(s): Elena Arnedo (m. 1964; div. 1985) Isabel Preysler (m. 1987)
- Children: 3
- Education: Complutense University of Madrid

Miguel Boyer (5 February 1939 – 29 September 2014) was a Spanish economist and politician, who served as minister of economy, treasury and commerce from 1982 to 1985.

== Early life and education ==
Boyer was born in St. Jean de Luz, France, on 5 February 1939 to Don José Boyer y Ruíz-Beneyán and Doña Carlota Salvador-Sáenz y Sáinz de Vicuña.

He was a graduate of the Universidad Complutense de Madrid where he studied economics. He also received a degree in physics from the same university.

== Career ==
Boyer worked at different banks and institutions. He served as the director of planning for the Unión Explosivos Río Tinto and later as a senior economist at the Bank of Spain. He became the deputy director of the national industrial institute and then its director in 1974. Next he worked at the state-owned hydrocarbons institute. He was one of the Ibercorp shareholders.

Boyer joined the Socialist Party as part of its social democrat wing in 1960. He helped Felipe González to form a faction in the party in the mid-1970s. Boyer was a member of the Congress of Deputies, representing Jaén Province, and economic spokesperson of the party. He and Carlos Solchaga were the architects of the party's economy policy.

Boyer was appointed minister of economy, treasury and commerce to the first cabinet of Felipe González on 2 December 1982. In 1985, he developed a tax act that enabled people to avoid tax on saving interest if they invested in insurance accounts. During his term he was regarded as the most powerful member of the cabinet. However, in a cabinet reshuffle in July 1985 Boyer was removed from office and was succeeded by Carlos Solchaga in the post. It was speculated that Boyer was forced to resign due to his clash with Deputy Prime Minister Alfonso Guerra. In addition, Boyer attempted to increase his power in the cabinet and demanded to assume the post of second vice prime minister, also leading to his forced resignation.

Shortly after leaving office Boyer was named as the chief executive of the Banco Exterior de Espana and next of the investment company, Cartera Central. In 1986, he was named as a member of the Abragam committee that oversaw the future structure of the CERN. Until 1999 he served as a senior manager at the Spanish construction group FCC. From July 1999 to January 2005, he was the chairman of CLH, a Spanish fuel distribution company. In May 2010, Boyer was appointed board member to the Hispania Racing Team. He also assumed the post of finance director and advisor to the team. On 20 May 2010, he was also named as the independent member of the board of directors of Red Electrica Corporacion SA. In addition, he served as the head of Urbis.

=== Controversy ===
In February 1992, Boyer and Mariano Rubio, former governor of the Bank of Spain, were accused of fraud and share-price manipulation in relation to the Ibercorp. Boyer was not sentenced, but Rubio was sentenced to jail.

=== Views ===
In the 1970s, Boyer supported self-managing socialism. However, later he became known for his orthodox, moderate and pragmatic approach to economy. Despite being a member of the socialist government, he adopted neo-liberal views of economy when he was minister. In addition, he and his successor Carlos Solchaga did not fit into the party's projected socialist mould. They both implemented economic policies based the orthodox liberal ideas, and the social outcomes of these policies were largely neglected. Their priority was to reduce inflation, using steps to control the money supply, which reinforced the high levels of interest and a strong currency. Although Boyer's policy decreased the rate of inflation and government spending, Spain experienced the Europe's highest unemployment rate at about 20%. Boyer also encouraged the economic integration of Spain into the European Union.

== Personal life and death ==
Boyer divorced his first wife, gynecologist Elena Arnedo, to wed a socialite, Isabel Preysler, in 1987. Boyer's first wife, Elena Arnedo, was the cousin of Leopoldo Calvo-Sotelo. Isabel Preysler was the former spouse of the singer Julio Iglesias and Carlos Falcó, 5th Marquess of Griñón. They had a daughter, Ana Boyer. Boyer had also a son and a daughter with his first wife.

Boyer died of a pulmonary embolism after being admitted to the Ruber International Hospital in Madrid on 29 September 2014. He was 75.

== See also ==
- Delors Committee
