= Luis Carlos Croissier =

Spanish politician

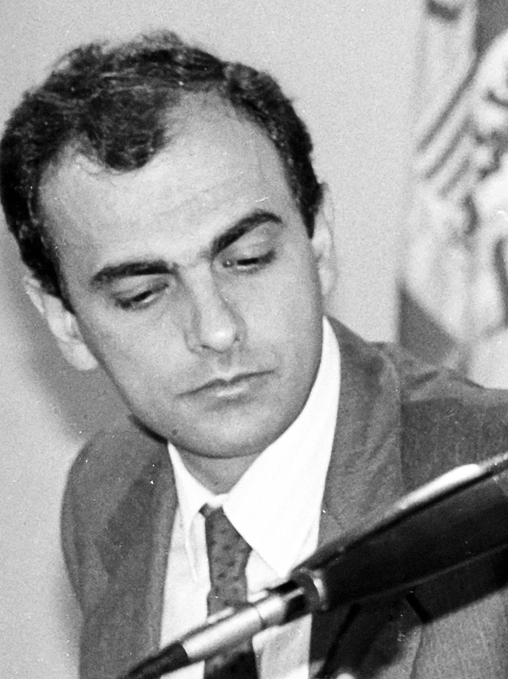
- Croissier in January 1987

President of the CNMV
- In office 1988–1996

Minister of Industry and Energy
- In office 1986–1988

President of the INI
- In office 1984–1986

Member of the Congress of Deputies
- In office 17 February 1983 – 23 April 1983
- Constituency: Madrid

Personal details
- Born: 18 August 1950 (age 74); Arucas, Spain
- Citizenship: Spanish
- Political party: Communist Party of Spain; Spanish Socialist Workers' Party
- Occupation: Politician, economist, business executive, civil servant

Luis Carlos Croissier Batista (born 1950) is a Spanish politician and executive. He served as Minister of Industry and Energy from 1986 to 1988.

== Biography ==
He was born on 18 August 1950 in Arucas, in the Canary Islands. He moved to the mainland to take his university studies and graduated in Economics at the Complutense University of Madrid, where he became a member of the clandestine Communist Party of Spain (PCE). Croissier, who went on to Paris to further continue post-graduate studies in Economics, returned to Spain in 1974 and joined the Spanish Socialist Workers' Party (PSOE). After the death of the dictator, Croissier joined the High Corps of Technicians in Civil Administration.

Croissier, who had run as candidate in the PSOE list vis-à-vis the 1982 general election, became a member of the Congress of Deputies in 1983, covering the vacant seat for Madrid left in the lower house by Francisco Fernández Ordóñez. He soon renounced to the seat and was replaced by Manuel Abejón Adámez.

Considered to be close to Carlos Solchaga, Croissier became the President of the Instituto Nacional de Industria (INI) in 1984. During his mandate the privatisation of the public sector accelerated.

Appointed as Minister of Industry and Energy of the second González cabinet, he was sworn in in July 1986, at 35 years old. (Note: At the time he was the brother-in-law of the then wife of Josep Borrell.) After his ministerial rule, he served for 8 years (1988–1996) as the first president of the National Securities Market Commission (CNMV), the financial regulator of the securities markets in Spain.

He has been a member of the board of directors of companies such as Adolfo Domínguez, Eolia, High Tech Hoteles, Jazztel, Repsol YPF and Alantra.

== Bibliography ==
- Rodríguez Teruel, Juan (2006). Los ministros de la España Democrática. Perfil, trayectorias y carrera ministerial de los miembros de gobierno de Suárez a Zapatero (1976–2005) (PDF). Universitat Autònoma de Barcelona.
