= Dirección General de Seguros y Fondos de Pensiones =

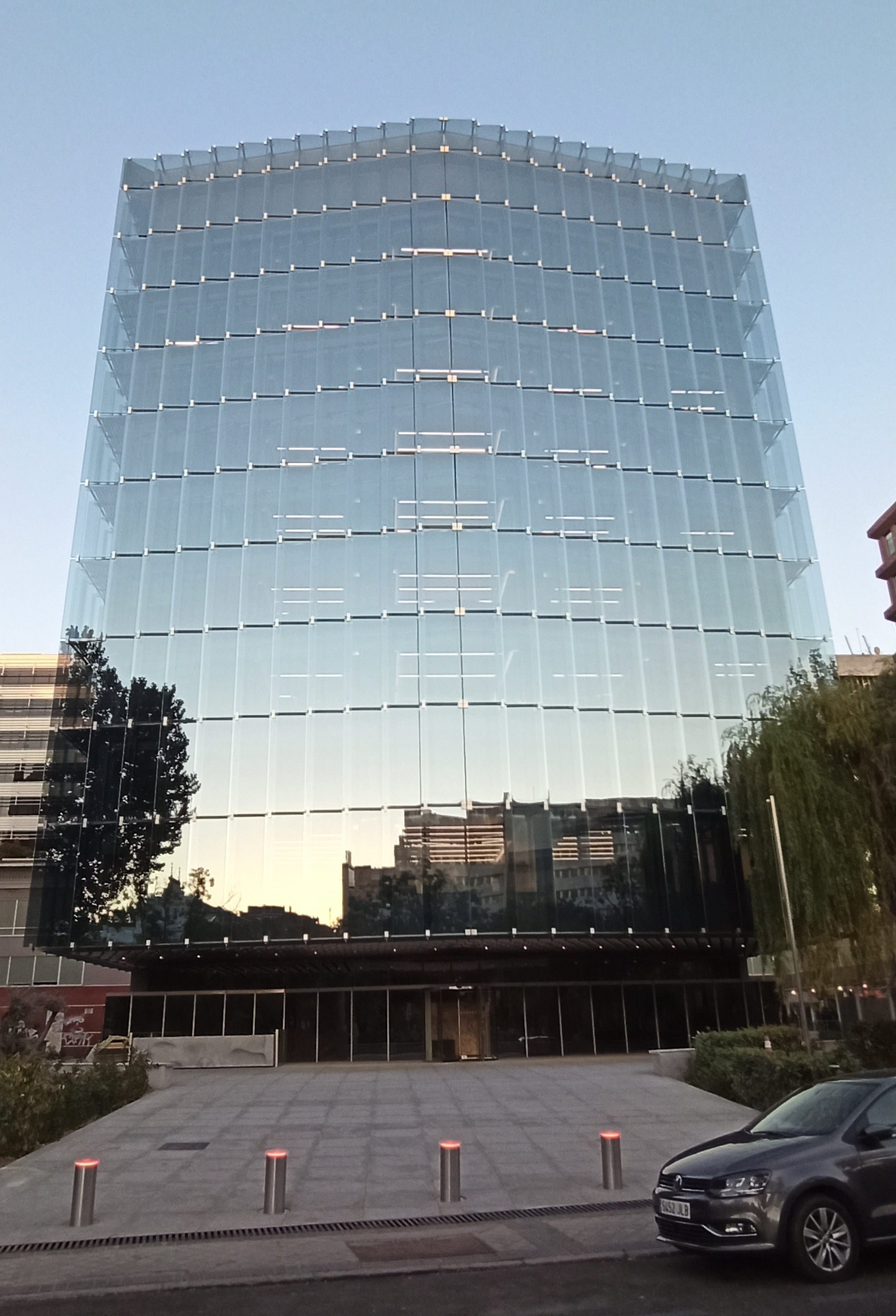
DGFSP's headquarters, Madrid.

The Directorate-General for Insurance and Pension Funds (Spanish: Dirección General de Seguros y Fondos de Pensiones) (DGSFP) is the Spanish government's financial regulatory department that supervises and controls Spain's insurance and pension fund sector. It is part of the Spanish State Secretariat for Economic Affairs (Secretaría de Estado de Economía) of the Ministry of Economy of Spain.

It is responsible for ensuring that the sector functions properly and provides customers of insurance agencies and members of pension funds with appropriate protection. To that end, it is empowered to regulate, issue instructions to, and supervise the institutions that comprise the sector, thus guaranteeing proper operation in accordance with current legislation.

The DGSFP increasingly implements policies set at the European Union level, and is a voting member of the Board of Supervisors of the European Insurance and Occupational Pensions Authority (EIOPA). It is also a member of the European Systemic Risk Board (ESRB).

== History ==
The DGSFP was established under Royal Decree (Real Decreto, in Spanish) 1127/2008 of 4 July 2008, which develops the basic structure of the Ministry.

== See also ==
- Ministry of Economy and Finance (Ministerio de Economía y Hacienda de España, MEH)
- Insurance Compensation Consortium (Consorcio de Compensación de Seguros, CCS)
- Comisión Nacional del Mercado de Valores (National Securities Market Commission, CNMV)
- Bank of Spain
- List of financial supervisory authorities by country
