= Ministry of Economy and Finance (Spain) =

- Ministerio de Economía y Hacienda

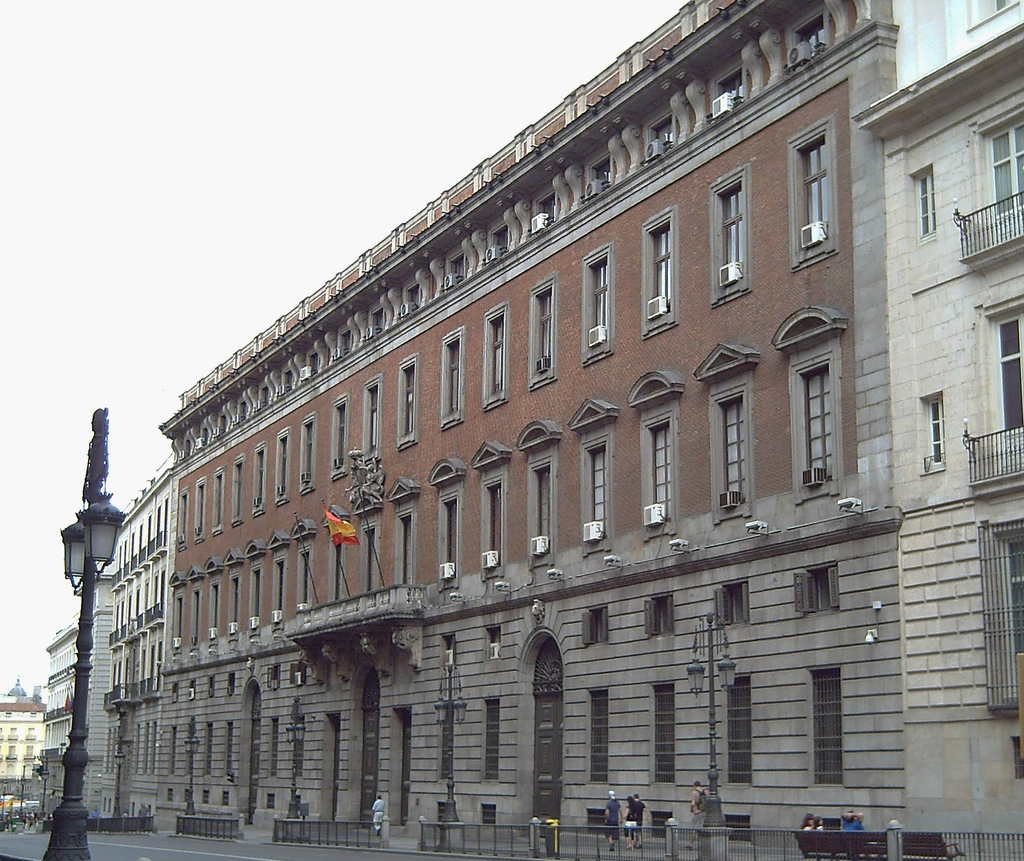
- Main headquarters

Agency overview
- Formed: 8 December 1982 (1st); 17 April 2004 (2nd)
- Preceding agencies: Ministry of Finance; Ministry of Economy
- Dissolved: 27 April 2000 (1st); 22 December 2011 (2nd)
- Superseding agencies: Ministry of Finance; Ministry of Economy
- Type: Ministry
- Jurisdiction: Government of Spain
- Website: www.meh.es

The Ministry of Economy and Finance (MEH) was a ministerial department in the Government of Spain that merged the traditional ministries of Finance and Economy, with competences on economic affairs, public finance and budgets. It was established on two occasions: the first time during the premierships of Felipe González (1982–1996) and the first term of José María Aznar (1996–2000), and the second time during the premiership of José Luis Rodríguez Zapatero (2004–2011).

Due to its size and the vast amount of competences on economic and finance affairs under its control, it has been often dubbed as a "superministry".

== List of officeholders ==
Office name:

- Ministry of Economy and Finance (1982–2000; 2004–2011)

Portrait	Name (Birth–Death)	Term of office			Party	Government	Prime Minister (Tenure)	Ref.
Portrait	Name (Birth–Death)	Took office	Left office	Duration	Party	Government	Prime Minister (Tenure)	Ref.
	Miguel Boyer (1939–2014)	8 December 1982	5 July 1985	2 years and 209 days	PSOE	González I	Felipe González (1982–1996)	
	Carlos Solchaga (born 1944)	5 July 1985	26 July 1986	8 years and 9 days	PSOE	González I	Felipe González (1982–1996)	
	Carlos Solchaga (born 1944)	26 July 1986	7 December 1989	8 years and 9 days	PSOE	González II	Felipe González (1982–1996)	
	Carlos Solchaga (born 1944)	7 December 1989	14 July 1993	8 years and 9 days	PSOE	González III	Felipe González (1982–1996)	
	Pedro Solbes (1942–2023)	14 July 1993	6 May 1996	2 years and 297 days	Independent	González IV	Felipe González (1982–1996)	
	Rodrigo Rato (born 1949)	6 May 1996	28 April 2000	3 years and 358 days	PP	Aznar I	José María Aznar (1996–2004)	
Office disestablished during this interval. (Note: The department's competences were transferred to the ministries of Finance and Economy between 2000 and 2004.)
	Pedro Solbes (1942–2023)	18 April 2004	14 April 2008	4 years and 354 days	Independent	Zapatero I	José Luis; Rodríguez Zapatero (2004–2011)	
	Pedro Solbes (1942–2023)	14 April 2008	7 April 2009	4 years and 354 days	Independent	Zapatero II	José Luis; Rodríguez Zapatero (2004–2011)	
	Elena Salgado (born 1949)	7 April 2009	22 December 2011	2 years and 259 days	Independent	Zapatero II	José Luis; Rodríguez Zapatero (2004–2011)	
Office disestablished.
