= Enrique Múgica =

Spanish lawyer and politician (1932–2020)

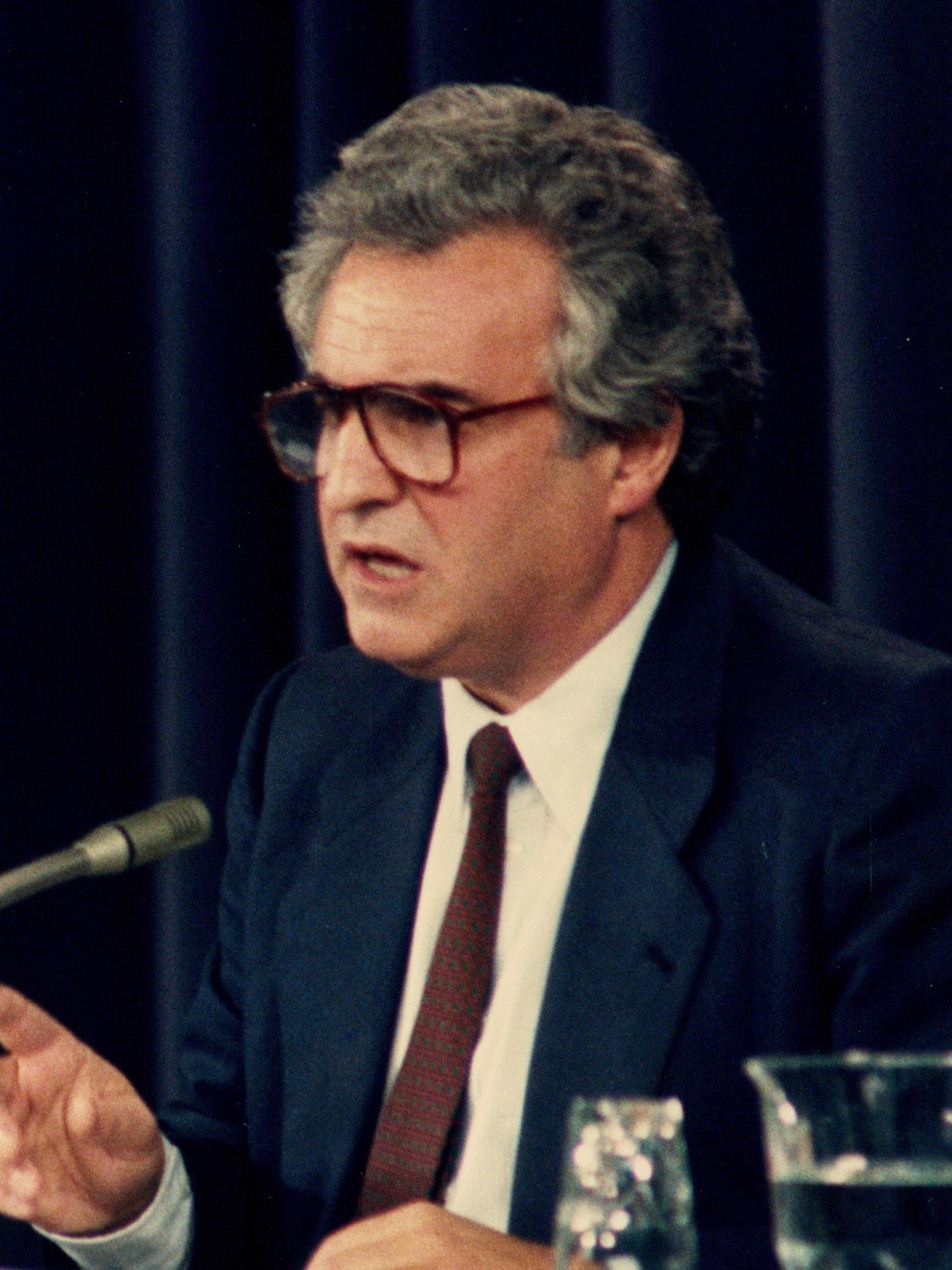

Ombudsman of Spain
- In office 15 June 2000 – 30 June 2010
- Monarch: Juan Carlos I
- Preceded by: Antonio Rovira Viñas
- Succeeded by: María Luisa Cava de Llano y Carrió

Minister of Justice
- In office 12 July 1988 – 12 March 1991
- Monarch: Juan Carlos I
- Prime Minister: Felipe González
- Preceded by: Fernando Ledesma Bartret
- Succeeded by: Tomás de la Quadra-Salcedo

Member of the Congress of Deputies
- In office 1977–2000
- Constituency: Gipuzkoa

Personal details
- Born: Enrique Múgica Herzog; 20 February 1932 San Sebastián, Guipúzcoa, Spanish Republic
- Died: 10 April 2020 (aged 88)
- Party: PSOE

Enrique Múgica Herzog (20 February 1932 – 11 April 2020) was a Spanish lawyer and politician.

An opponent of Francoist Spain, he spent three years in prison. He was one of the leaders of the Spanish Socialist Party (PSOE), in Franco's time. He managed the establishment of diplomatic relations between Spain and Israel. He was a member of the PSOE, Minister of Justice (1988–1991), deputy (representing Gipuzkoa 1977–2000) and Ombudsman (2000–2010).

He was born in San Sebastián, Guipúzcoa. His father was a Basque violinist who was killed during the Civil War and his mother was a Frenchwoman of Polish Jewish origin. His brother Fernando was murdered by ETA in February 1996.

== Francoism ==
Despite allegedly not being a communist, his opposition to the Francoist system led Múgica to join the outlawed PCE in 1953, where he remained for a decade. In February 1956 Múgica, Javier Pradera and Ramón Tamames wrote a manifesto calling to a National University Congress not subjected to the authority of SEU, Falange's student union. This led to the first public university protest against the Francoist regime, and following a clash with Falangist activists they were arrested along with other opposing figures. This incident led to the destitution of Education Minister Joaquín Ruiz-Giménez, the decline of SEU which was sidelined from the Youth Front for losing the grip on the student body, and the start of the organized university protest movement. For his actions Múgica was imprisoned for three months in Carabanchel Prison.

== Transition to democracy and first PSOE government ==
In the first democratic elections Múgica was elected as a deputy for PSOE in the Congress, where he would serve for the next 23 years. In the late 1970s he additionally served as PSOE's Secretary for Political Relations. In 1980 he and Joan Reventós met general Alfonso Armada in a lunch organized by Lleida's mayor Antonio Ciurana. According to Múgica, Armada was "deeply worried" about the autonomous system and terrorism and asked them for an UCD–PSOE coalition led by an independent figure but didn't propose himself nor anyone else from the military for such role. Months later Armada took part in the 1981 attempted coup d'état.

In 2009 former Catalan President Jordi Pujol claimed in the second volume of his memories that in 1980 Múgica had proposed to him to have Prime Minister Adolfo Suárez replaced by a democratically leaning military. Múgica denied such claim as a "made up fancy". Commanding officer involved in the coup Ricardo Pardo Zancada recognized in his book that Armada contemplated Múgica as Minister of Health in the hypothetical government that emerged from the coup.

In 1979 he was a founding executive of the Amistad España–Israel association, and he and his brother Fernando had a leading role in convincing Felipe González to establish diplomatic relations with Israel and managing the process, which was finally sealed in 1986. Múgica was highly attached to Israel and as a Jew he felt proud to be "part of a people always in search of freedom and wisdom", listing Spain, the Basque Country and Israel as his "three loves".

== Justice Minister ==
Múgica was the first Jew to take part in the Spanish government since the Inquisition. Under his tenure the law regulating anonymous societies and demarcation and judicial plan were approved, and the penal reforms leading to the creation of the Juzgados de lo Penal were carried out.

He harshly opposed the insubordinate movement against the then compulsory military service, admonishing them that the full weight of law would fall on them for "using conscientious objection to destabilize the democratic state and being supported by radicals and violent [elements]".

In September 1990 he was questioned in the Congress of Deputies by Loyola de Palacio for allegedly replying to Cristina Alberdi's petition to increase the female representation in the General Council of the Judiciary as quoted: "Have they installed kitchens in the new offices?". Múgica apologized to those offended while defending his comment as a joke, which De Palacio harshly criticized.

He was dismissed in March 1991 along with several other ministers. His meeting with González was reported in the press to have been the most difficult of the round as he had expected to receive a different portfolio and his expression was of "disbelief mixed with anger" after realizing he would not.

== Ombudsman ==
Múgica left PSOE in 2000 after being chosen as Spain's ombudsman. He was the first ombudsman to serve for two terms, extending his service until 2010.

He favored restoring formal address in schools in order to improve the classroom environment, arguing that students addressing teachers as usted instead of tú doesn't imply a "breach" in their relation but "mutual respect".

He supported the 2010 Abortion Law except for the clause allowing girls between the age of 16 – 18 to abort without the knowledge or authorisation of their parents, and expressed that he didn't "give a damn about being excommunicated or not" for it.

=== Political controversies ===
During his ten-year service Múgica remained outspoken in political matters. In 2004, he defended the construction of the Israeli West Bank barrier by the Government of Israel, arguing that it was Palestinian terrorism that "legitimized the fence", which generated great controversy due to the position he held.

Likewise his controversy with the anti-bullfighting movement, his disapproval of the Statute of Autonomy of Catalonia (against which he filed an appeal of unconstitutionality) in 2006, his statements against the Historical Memory Law, his refusal to appeal the Aliens Act of 2000 (which the Constitutional Court would later amend) or opposition to contacts between the government of José Luis Rodríguez Zapatero and ETA.

== Death ==
Enrique Múgica died on 10 April 2020 from COVID-19.

Preceded by Fernando Ledesma Bartret	Ministry of Justice of Spain; 1988–1991	Succeeded by Tomás de la Quadra-Salcedo

Preceded by Fernando Álvarez de Miranda	Defensor del Pueblo (Ombudsman); 2000–2010	Succeeded by María Luisa Cava de Llano y Carrió
