= Carlos Romero (Spanish politician) =

Spanish politician

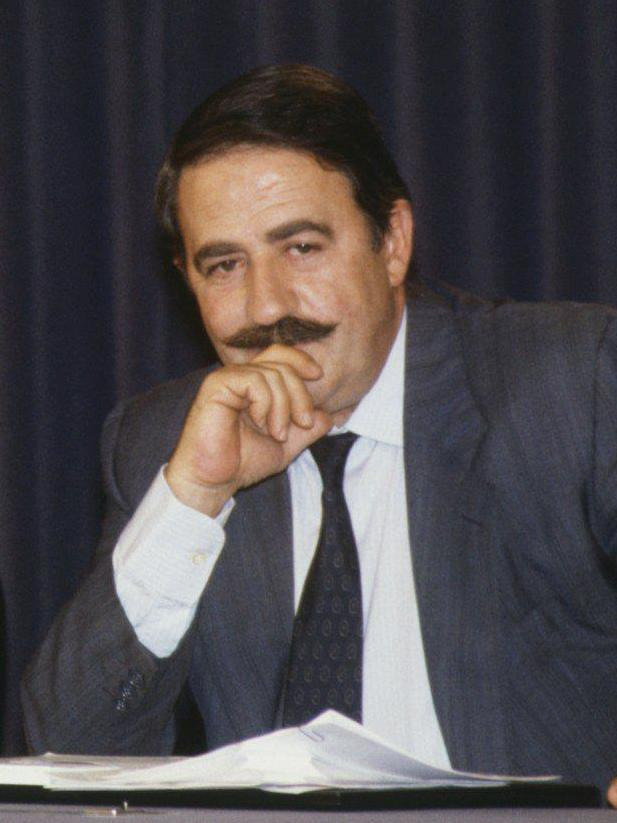

Minister of Agriculture, Fisheries and Food
- In office 3 December 1982 – 13 March 1991
- Prime Minister: Felipe González
- Preceded by: José Luis García Ferrero
- Succeeded by: Pedro Solbes

Personal details
- Born: José Carlos Romero Herrera; 1941 (age 84–85) Fuentesaúco, Zamora, Spain
- Party: Spanish Socialist Workers' Party
- Education: Complutense University of Madrid

José Carlos Romero Herrera (born 1941) is a Spanish politician who served as Minister of Agriculture, Fisheries and Food from December 1982 to March 1991.

Member of the PSOE (Partido Socialista Obrero Español, "Spanish Socialist Worker's Party), he was named Minister of Agriculture in the formation of Felipe González's first government in 1982, a role he held during three administrations. In the general elections of 1986, and again in 1989, he was elected to the Congreso de los Diputados, the lower house of the Spanish Parliament, to represent the province of Zamora.
