= Under-Secretary of the Presidency =

Spanish civil servant

- Subsecretario de la Presidencia
- Coat of Arms used by the Government

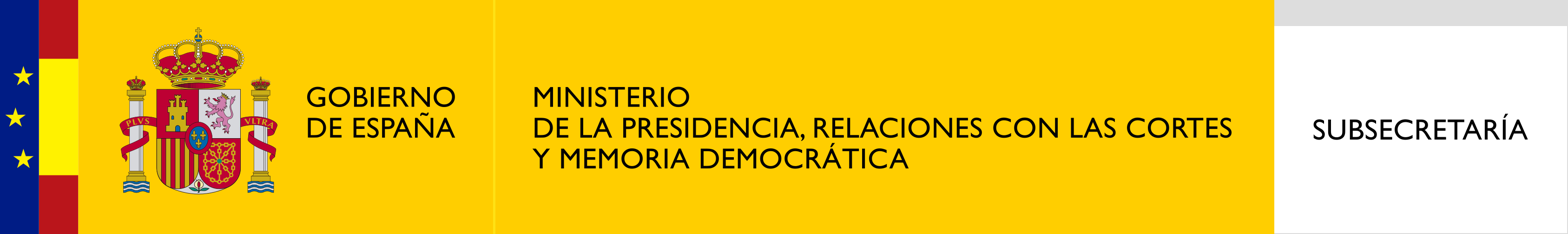

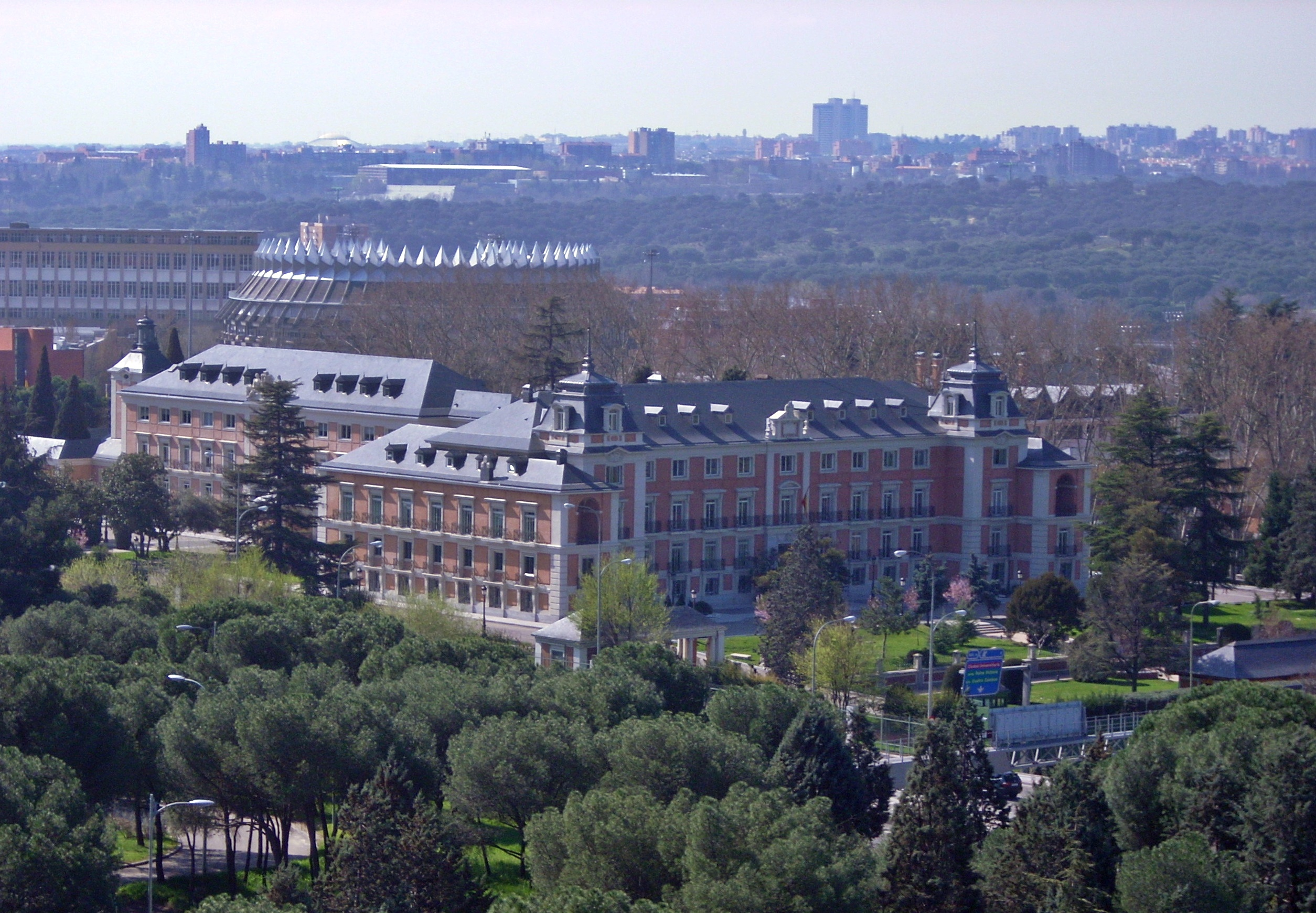
- Incumbent; Alberto Herrera Rodríguez since 28 July 2021
- Ministry of the Presidency; Undersecretariat of the Presidency
- Style: The Most Excellent (formal); Mr/Ms. Under-Secretary(informal)
- Nominator: The Presidency Minister
- Appointer: The Monarch
- Precursor: Secretary of the Presidency
- Formation: July 15, 1865
- First holder: Alejandro Shee y Saavedra
- Salary: € 111,802.37 per year
- Website: mpr.gob.es

The under-secretary of the presidency is the most senior civil servant of the Spanish Ministry of the Presidency, Justice and Relations with the Cortes.

The under-secretary is responsible for assisting the minister in his duties to support the Prime Minister, preparing the meeting of the Council of Ministers and other government meetings, coordinating and directing the common services of the department, controlling the economic, human and technological resources of the Ministry, elaborating the governmental regulations, giving authorization for the use of the Coat of Arms, Flag and other symbols of the State and the competences about the ministry's gender equality and transparency.

== History ==
It received the official name of Undersecretariat of the Presidency of the Council of Ministers and its first holder was Alejandro Shee y Saavedra. The office was maintained intact between 1865 and 1939, when the francoist government change its denomination to Undersecretariat of the Prime Minister's Office.

On July 19, 1951, the Undersecretariat was elevated to Ministry and Luis Carrero Blanco was appointed the Minister-Under Secretary of the Presidency.

Around 1974, the Undersecretariat lost its ministerial level when the Ministry of the Presidency was officially created and the first was subordinated to it.

Between 1986 and 1993 the Ministry of the Presidency was renamed Ministry of Relations with the Cortes and of the Secretariat of the Government receiving the Undersecretariat the same denomination. Between 2016 and 2018 the Under Secretary received also the competences of the Undersecretariat of Territorial Administration (current Under Secretary of Territorial Policy and Civil Service) and since 2018 it has also the competences over Relations with the Cortes and Equality. In 2020, the Ministry lost its responsibilities on equality but acquired those on democratic memory and religious freedom.

== Organization ==
From the Undersecretariat is organized as follows:

Undersecretariat Organization (2026)
Under-Secretary	Technical Cabinet
Under-Secretary	Division for Grace Rights and Other Rights
Technical Secretary-General — Government Secretariat	Deputy Technical Secretary-General
Technical Secretary-General — Government Secretariat	Deputy Directorate-General for Legislative Policy
Technical Secretary-General — Government Secretariat	Deputy Directorate-General for Publications, Documentation and Archive
Technical Secretary-General — Government Secretariat	Deputy Directorate-General for Administrative Appeals and Relations with the Courts
Technical Secretary-General — Government Secretariat	Office of the Government Secretariat
Technical Secretary-General — Government Secretariat	Deputy Directorate-General for Agreements and Provisions Monitoring
Technical Secretary-General — Government Secretariat	Office for Regulatory Coordination and Quality
Director-General for Services	Administrative Office
Director-General for Services	Budget Office
Director-General for Services	Deputy Directorate-General for Economic Management
Director-General for Services	Deputy Directorate-General for Planning and Coordination
Director-General for Services	Deputy Directorate-General for Human Resources
Director-General for Services	Deputy Directorate-General for ICT
Director-General for Services	Deputy Directorate-General for Administrative Information and Inspection of Services
Director-General for Religious Freedom	Deputy Directorate-General for Coordination and Promotion of Religious Freedom
Director-General for Religious Freedom	Office for the Recognition and Reparation of Sexual Abuse within the Catholic Church
