= Carlos Solchaga =

Spanish politician (born 1944)

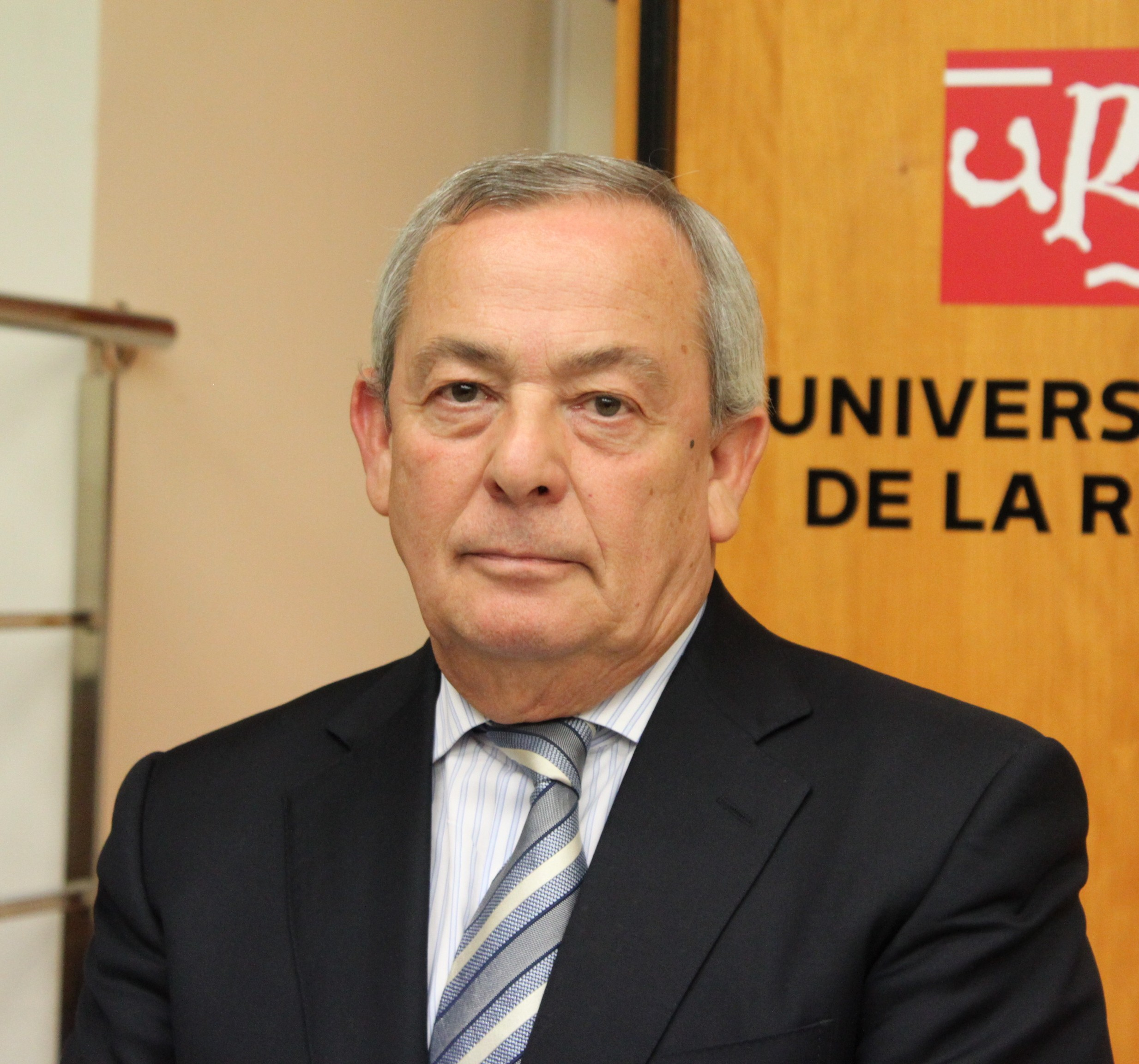

Minister of Economy and Finance
- In office July 1985 – 1993
- Prime Minister: Felipe González
- Preceded by: Miguel Boyer
- Succeeded by: Pedro Solbes

Minister of Industry and Energy
- In office 1982 – July 1985
- Prime Minister: Felipe González

Personal details
- Born: Carlos Solchaga Catalán; 28 March 1944 (age 82) Tafalla (Navarre), Spain
- Party: Socialist Party (Until 1994)
- Education: Complutense University of Madrid; The Massachusetts Institute of Technology

Carlos Solchaga (born 28 March 1944) is a Spanish economist, businessman and politician, who served in different capacities at various Spanish cabinets.

== Early life and education ==
Solchaga was born in Tafalla in 1944. He holds a bachelor's degree in economics and business studies which he obtained from Madrid's Complutense University in 1966. He received a master's degree from the Massachusetts Institute of Technology in 1971.

== Career ==
Solchaga began his career at the Bank of Spain. He was the economic studies manager and advisor at Banco de Vizcaya from 1976 to 1979. Then he served as a minister for trade of the Basque general council of Spain from 1979 to 1980. He was the member of the Spanish Parliament from 1980 to 1995, representing Navarre Province, being part of the Socialist Party. He was one of the party officials who developed the party's neoliberal economic program and was among right-wing leaders of the party.

His first ministerial post was the minister for industry and energy, which he held from 1982 to 1985 in the first cabinet of Felipe Gonzalez. In a reshuffle of July 1985, Solchaga was appointed economy and finance minister to the cabinet again led by Prime Minister Gonzalez. He replaced Miguel Boyer in the post.

Solchaga resigned from office in July 1993 due to the scandal surrounded the activities of Mariano Rubio, the governor of the Bank of Spain. The scandal is known as the Ibercorp case. Pedro Solbes replaced him as finance minister. Solchaga was named as the party's parliamentary leader in July 1993 after leaving office. However, following this period he was gradually marginalized from decision-making mechanism within the party and in 1994, he left the party.

Solchaga was appointed chairman of the interim committee of the International Monetary Fund in 1991. His term ended in September 1993, and the finance minister of Belgium, Philippe Maystadt, succeeded him as chairman of the committee.

Next Solchaga began to work in private sector. He has been the international consultant of the Solchaga and Recio Asociados since 1999. He is also the chairman of the Euroamerica Foundation and the vice-chairman of the Reina Sofia National Museum. He is on the board of several institutions, including PRISA and Renta Corporación.

== Views ==
When they were in office both Solchaga and his predecessor Miguel Boyer implemented economic policies based the orthodox liberal ideas, and the social outcomes of these policies were largely neglected. Solchaga continued Boyer's moderation and orthodox economy approach. It was partly because they did not fit into the socialist mould the government projected. Their priority was to reduce inflation using steps to control the money supply, which reinforced the high levels of interest and a strong currency. In addition, like Boyer he objected the approach and views of Alfonso Guerra, deputy prime minister.
