= Félix Pons =

Spanish politician (1942–2010)

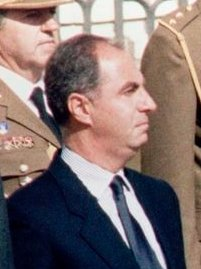
Félix Pons in 1988

Félix Pons Irazazábal (14 September 1942, Palma – 2 July 2010, Id.) was a Spanish politician. He served as the President of the Congress of Deputies of Spain from 1986 until 1996; previously he had served as the Minister of Territorial Administration. In Congress he represented the Balearic Islands. Pons was a member of the Spanish Socialist Workers' Party. He died of cancer. His brother Josep Pons is the Spanish ambassador in Austria and became the president of RCD Mallorca on 8 July 2010.
