= José María Maravall =

Spanish academic and politician

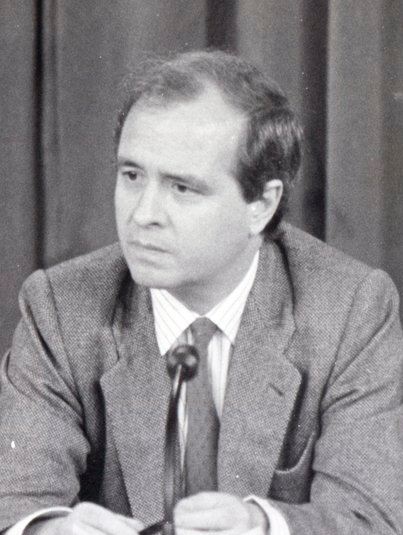
José María Maravall in 1987

José María Maravall Herrero, FBA (Madrid, 1942) is a Spanish academic and a politician of the Spanish Socialist Workers' Party.

== Education ==
Maravall holds doctorates from both the Complutense University of Madrid and Oxford University, as well as an Honorary D.Litt. from Warwick University.

== Career ==
Maravall was, until his retirement, the director of the Centre for Advanced Studies in the Social Sciences (CEACS -Juan March Institute in Madrid) and a professor at the Complutense University of Madrid. He has taught at the University of Warwick and, as a visiting professor, at the universities of New York (NYU), Columbia, Harvard, and the European University Institute (Florence). He has had a long personal political experience, first in underground anti-Francoist politics and later, under democracy, in social democratic politics. He was the Spanish Minister of Education and Science from 1982 to 1988, and was a member of the Spanish Parliament.

== Awards and honors ==
Maravall is an Honorary Fellow of St. Antony's College (Oxford), a Corresponding Fellow of the British Academy (FBA), and a foreign member of the American Academy of Arts and Sciences. He is a "Commandeur de l'Ordre des Palmes Academiques" in France and has won the National Award for Political Science and Sociology in Spain.

== Works ==
- Dictatorship and Political Dissent (Dictadura y Disentimiento Político), St. Martin's Press, 1978
- The Transition to Democracy in Spain (La Política de la Transición), St. Martin's Press, 1982
- Economic Reforms in New Democracies (co-author with Luiz Carlos Bresser and Adam Przeworski), Cambridge University Press, 1993
- Los Resultados de la Democracia, Alianza Editorial, 1995
- Regimes, Politics and Markets, Oxford University Press, 1997
- El Control de los Políticos, Taurus, 2003
- Democracy and the Rule of Law (co-editor with Adam Przeworski), Cambridge University Press, 2003
- La Confrontación Politica, Taurus, 2008
- Controlling Governments (co-editor with Ignacio Sánchez-Cuenca), Cambridge University Press 2008
- Las Promesas Políticas, Galaxia Gutenberg 2013
- Demands on Democracy, Oxford University Press, 2016
- La Democracia y la Izquierda, Galaxia Gutenberg 2021.
