= Alfonso Guerra =

Spanish politician (born 1940)

Alfonso Guerra González
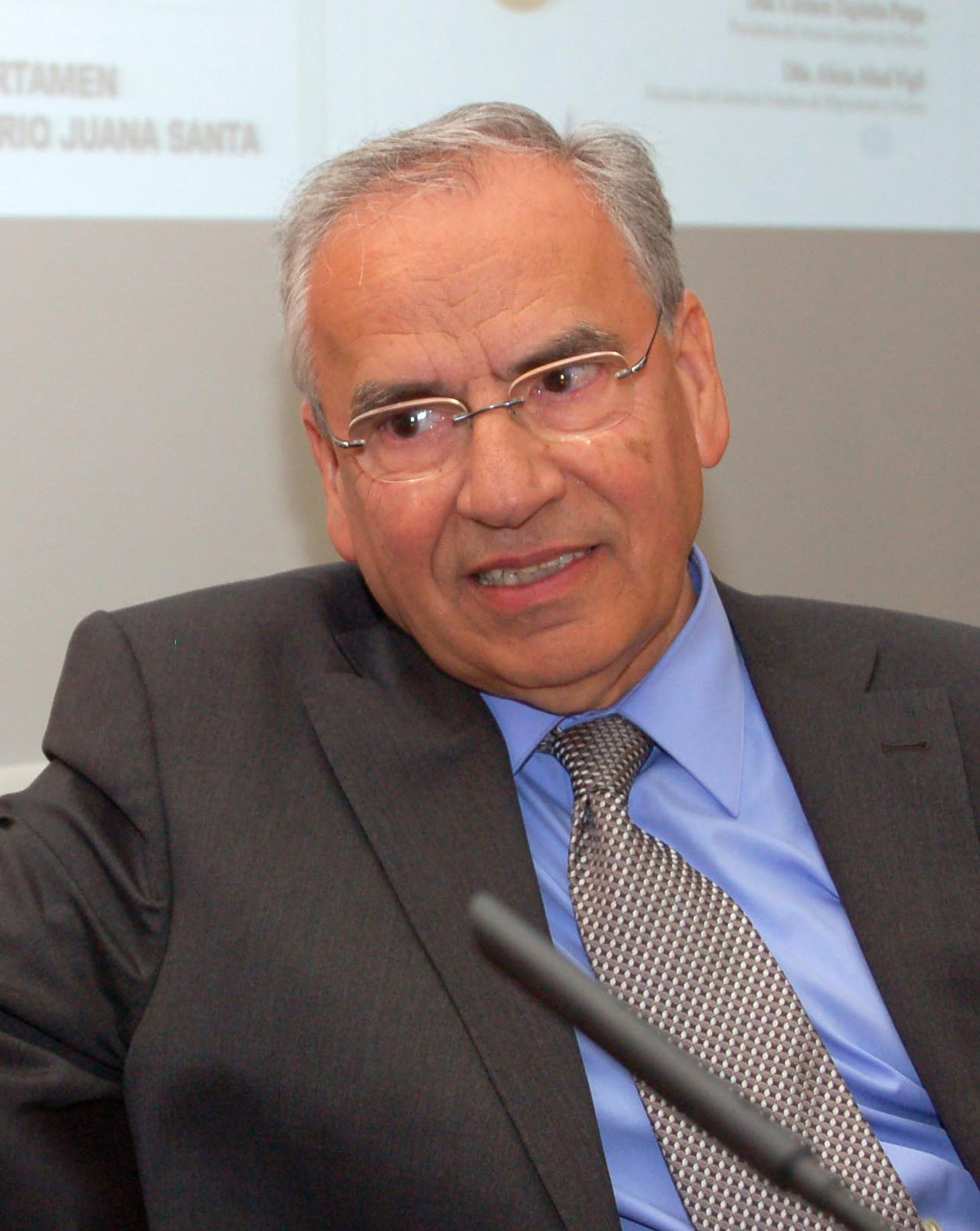

Deputy Prime Minister of Spain
- In office 3 December 1982 – 15 January 1991
- Prime Minister: Felipe González
- Preceded by: Rodolfo Martín Villa
- Succeeded by: Narcís Serra

Member of the Congress of Deputies
- In office 15 June 1977 – 14 January 2015
- Constituency: Seville

Personal details
- Born: Alfonso Guerra González; 31 May 1940 (age 86) Seville, Spain
- Party: PSOE
- Education: University of Seville

Alfonso Guerra González (born 31 May 1940) is a Spanish politician. A leading member of the Spanish Socialist Workers' Party (PSOE), he served as vice president of the government (vicepresidente del Gobierno, i.e. equivalent to deputy prime minister) of Spain from 1982 to 1991 under the premiership of Felipe González. He represented Seville province in the Congress of Deputies from 1977 to 2015, and was the longest-serving deputy at the time of his departure.

In 1988, Guerra received an honorary degree from the Universidad Nacional Federico Villarreal in Lima, Peru, and he was awarded the Medaglia D'oro in 1984 by the Sapienza University of Rome. Guerra was an extremely controversial politician, noted for his acid discourse against his opponents, which was criticised as demagogy by his political adversaries. He was forced to quit his position as vice-president after a financial scandal involving his brother Juan Guerra.

On 5 November 2014, Guerra announced that he would be resigning from congress at the end of the parliamentary session in December 2014. At the time of his resignation announcement, he was the longest serving member of congress.

Political offices
Preceded by Rodolfo Martín Villa	Deputy Prime Minister of Spain; 1982–1991	Succeeded by Narcís Serra
Party political offices
Preceded by Nicolás Redondo	Secretary of Organization of the Spanish Socialist Workers' Party; 1976–1979	Succeeded by Carmen García Bloise
Preceded by Felipe González	Leader of the Socialist Group in the Congress of Deputies; 1979–1982	Succeeded by Javier Sáenz de Cosculluela
First	Deputy Secretary-General of the PSOE; 1979–1997	Vacant None elected until 2008 Title next held by José Blanco
