= Fernando Ledesma (politician) =

Spanish politician (born 1939)

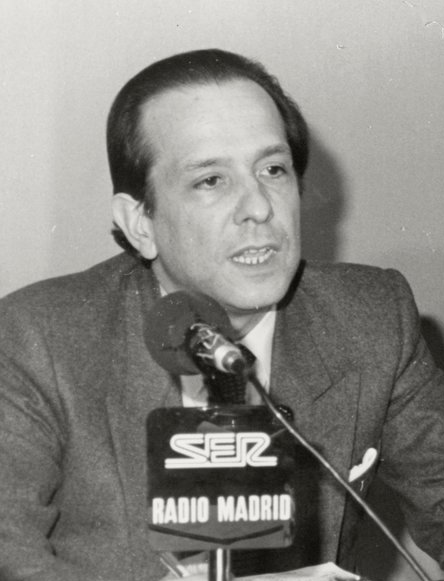

Minister of Justice
- In office 28 December 1982 – 12 July 1988
- Prime Minister: Felipe González
- Preceded by: Pío Cabanillas Gallas
- Succeeded by: Enrique Múgica Herzog

Personal details
- Born: Fernando Ledesma Bartret; 30 December 1939 (age 86) Toledo, Spain
- Education: University of Salamanca

Fernando Ledesma Bartret (born 30 December 1939) is a Spanish politician and served as the minister of justice from 1982 to 1986.

== Early life and education ==
Ladesma was born in Toledo on 30 December 1939. He attended the University of Salamanca between 1956 and 1961 and received a degree in law.

== Career ==
Ladesma was appointed prosecutor and judge of Administrative Litigation in opposition. He served in the Territorial Courts of Palma de Mallorca, Valladolid, Madrid and the Spanish National Court. By choice of the Congress of Deputies he was appointed member of the General Council of the Judiciary.

Ledesma served as a member of the Council of Judiciary until 1982. He was appointed justice minister on 28 December following the 1982 general elections won by the PSOE. He replaced Pío Cabanillas Gallas in the post. Ledesma was in office until 12 July 1986 when Enrique Múgica Herzog was appointed as justice minister.

Ledesma is a permanent member of the State Council.
