= Javier Sáenz de Cosculluela =

Spanish politician and lawyer

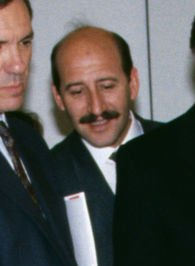
Cosculluela in 1990

Javier Luis Sáenz de Cosculluela (born 11 October 1944, Logroño, Spain) is a politician and Spanish lawyer. He served as a Minister in the second, third and fourth terms of Felipe González.

== Biography ==
Sáenz studied law at the University of Barcelona, specializing in labor law. He participated in the political activity against Francoist Spain in the 1970s. He was secretly a member of the Spanish Socialist Workers' Party and of the General Union of Workers in 1973 and was one of the founders of the Socialist Federation of The Rioja.

Sáenz was chosen Deputy to the Congress in the Constituent Legislature of Spain in 1977 by the province of Logroño, and re-elected five more times until he left the seat in 1996. He was Minister of Public Works and Transport. On 6 June 2008, he was appointed new President of the National Association of Community Managers(AERCO) during the celebration of the Extraordinary General Assembly of this Association.

== Posts held ==
- General secretary of the PSOE of The Rioja (1973-1981).
- Deputy by The Rioja in the Congress of Deputies (1977-1996).
- General secretary of the Socialist Group in the Congress of Deputies (1981-1982).
- Spokesman of the Socialist Group in the Congress of Deputies (1982-1985).
- Minister of Public Works and Transportation of Spain (1985-1991).
