= Fourth government of Felipe González =

1993–1996 government of Spain

4th government of Felipe González
- Government of Spain
- 1993–1996
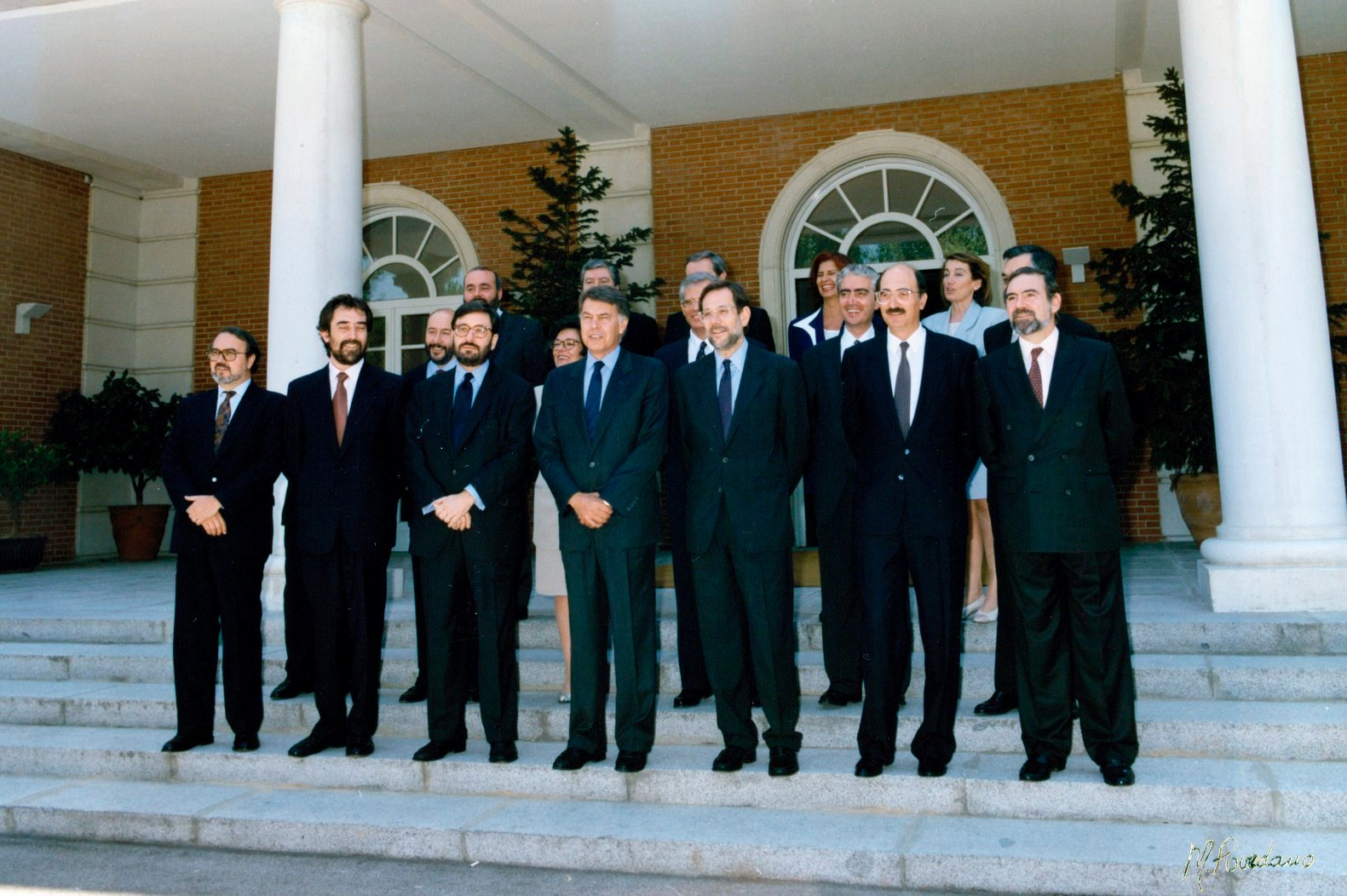
- The government in July 1993
- Date formed: 14 July 1993
- Date dissolved: 6 May 1996

People and organisations
- Monarch: Juan Carlos I
- Prime Minister: Felipe González
- Deputy Prime Minister: Narcís Serra (1993–1995)
- No. of ministers: 17 (Note: Does not include the prime minister.) (1993–1994); 16 (1994–1995); 15 (1995–1996)
- Total no. of members: 21
- Member party: PSOE
- Status in legislature: Minority (single-party)
- Opposition party: PP
- Opposition leader: José María Aznar

History
- Election: 1993 general election
- Outgoing election: 1996 general election
- Legislature term: 5th Cortes Generales
- Budget: 1994, 1995
- Predecessor: González III
- Successor: Aznar I

The fourth government of Felipe González was formed on 14 July 1993, following the latter's election as prime minister of Spain by the Congress of Deputies on 9 July and his swearing-in on 13 July, as a result of the Spanish Socialist Workers' Party (PSOE) emerging as the largest parliamentary force at the 1993 Spanish general election. It succeeded the third González government and was the government of Spain from 14 July 1993 to 6 May 1996, a total of 1,027 days, or 2 years, 9 months and 22 days.

González's fourth cabinet was an important change compared to the previous one: only five members remained in their previous ministries, four changed of portfolio and eight were new. It was described as the least political cabinet out of the four González governments, with up to six independent figures, as well as the one with the most female ministers (Carmen Alborch, Ángeles Amador and Cristina Alberdi). The sole deputy prime minister's office under Narcís Serra from the Socialists' Party of Catalonia (PSC) was maintained with increased competences on economic affairs.

The parliamentary defeat of the 1996 General State Budget bill on 25 October 1995 led to the virtual downfall of González's government, which was forced to prorogue the 1995 budget and ultimately decided to dissolve parliament and call a snap election. It was automatically dismissed on 4 March 1996 as a consequence of the 1996 general election, but remained in acting capacity until the next government was sworn in.

== Investiture ==
Investiture; Congress of Deputies; Nomination of Felipe González (PSOE)
Ballot →	9 July 1993
Required majority →	176 out of 350
Yes: • PSOE (159); • CiU (17); • PNV (5)	181 / 350
No: • PP (141); • IU–IC (17); • CC (4); • ERC (1); • EA (1); • UV (1)	165 / 350
Abstentions: • PAR (1)	1 / 350
Absentees: • HB (2); • IU–IC (1)	3 / 350

== Cabinet changes ==
González's fourth government saw a number of cabinet changes during its tenure:

- On 18 November 1993, Minister of the Interior José Luis Corcuera announced his intention to submit his resignation after the Constitutional Court of Spain declared the unconstitutionality of a number of provisions within the 1992 Organic Law on Protection of Citizen Security, colloquially known as the "Corcuera Law" or the "Law of kick down the door", that allowed police forces, without previous judicial authorization, to enter private properties based on the mere suspicion that a crime was being committed within. Corcuera's resignation was accepted on 24 November, and the following day Antoni Asunción was appointed to replace him at the helm of the interior ministry.
- On 6 May 1994, Juan Alberto Belloch and Luis María Atienza were assigned the responsibilities of the Interior and Agriculture, Fisheries and Food ministries after the resignations of Antoni Asunción and Vicente Albero. Asunción announced on 30 April his intention to step down from his post after it transpired that former Director-General of the Civil Guard Luis Roldán, suspected of amassing a fortune through fraudulent means during his years of service and whose monitoring was responsibility of the Interior ministry, had fled Spain to escape legal prosecution. Concurrently, Albero resigned as agriculture minister on 4 May after he became involved in a tax fraud scandal. Prime Minister González accepted both ministers' resignations on 4 May 1994. As a result of the reshuffle, the Justice and Interior departments were merged into a single ministry.
- On 12 June 1995, a major scandal unveiled after it transpired that the Superior Center of Defense Information (CESID), the main Spanish intelligence agency at the time, had been recording and keeping the taped telephone conversations of dozens of prominent public figures for years, including politicians, businessmen, journalists or the King himself, apparently without the cabinet's knowledge. The scandal brought about the resignations of Julián García Vargas, Minister of Defence since 1991 and under whose authority the CESID was responsible to, but also of Deputy Prime Minister Narcís Serra, who had been the defence minister in the 1982 to 1991 period. Prime Minister González accepted the resignations on 28 June 1995, but despite earlier speculation on a larger reshuffle, the government changes were limited to replacing García Vargas by Minister of Education Gustavo Suárez Pertierra and the incorporation of former President of the Valencian Government Joan Lerma into the cabinet in the Public Administrations portfolio, replacing Jerónimo Saavedra who, in turn, filled Suárez Pertierra's vacancy in Education; no replacement for Narcís Serra as deputy prime minister was appointed.
- On 19 December 1995, Javier Solana was replaced by Carlos Westendorp in the Foreign Affairs portfolio after the former was elected as new Secretary General of NATO.

== Council of Ministers ==
The Council of Ministers was structured into the offices for the prime minister, the deputy prime minister, 16 ministries and the post of the spokesperson of the Government. The number of ministries was reduced to 15 after the ministries of Justice and Interior were merged in 1994. The office of the deputy prime minister was left vacant from 1995.

← González IV Government → (14 July 1993 – 6 May 1996)
Portfolio	Name	Party	Took office	Left office	Ref.
Prime Minister	Felipe González	PSOE	13 July 1993	5 May 1996	
Deputy Prime Minister	Narcís Serra	PSOE^{/PSC}	14 July 1993	2 July 1995	
Minister of Foreign Affairs	Javier Solana	PSOE	14 July 1993	19 December 1995	
Minister of Justice	Juan Alberto Belloch	Independent	14 July 1993	6 May 1994	
Minister of Defence	Julián García Vargas	PSOE	14 July 1993	2 July 1995	
Minister of Economy and Finance	Pedro Solbes	Independent	14 July 1993	6 May 1996	
Minister of the Interior	José Luis Corcuera	PSOE	14 July 1993	24 November 1993	
Minister of Public Works, Transport and Environment	Josep Borrell	PSOE	14 July 1993	6 May 1996	
Minister of Education and Science	Gustavo Suárez Pertierra	PSOE	14 July 1993	3 July 1995	
Minister of Labour and Social Security	José Antonio Griñán	PSOE	14 July 1993	6 May 1996	
Minister of Industry and Energy	Juan Manuel Eguiagaray	PSOE	14 July 1993	6 May 1996	
Minister of Agriculture, Fisheries and Food	Vicente Albero	PSOE	14 July 1993	4 May 1994	
Minister of the Presidency; Spokesperson of the Government	Alfredo Pérez Rubalcaba	PSOE	14 July 1993	6 May 1996	
Minister for Public Administrations	Jerónimo Saavedra	PSOE	14 July 1993	3 July 1995	
Minister of Culture	Carmen Alborch	Independent	14 July 1993	6 May 1996	
Minister of Health and Consumer Affairs	Ángeles Amador	Independent	14 July 1993	6 May 1996	
Minister of Social Affairs	Cristina Alberdi	Independent (Note: Joined the PSOE in October 1995.)	14 July 1993	6 May 1996	
Minister of Trade and Tourism	Javier Gómez-Navarro	Independent	14 July 1993	6 May 1996	
=== Changes November 1993 ===
Portfolio	Name	Party	Took office	Left office	Ref.
Minister of the Interior	Antoni Asunción	PSOE	25 November 1993	4 May 1994	
=== Changes May 1994 ===
Portfolio	Name	Party	Took office	Left office	Ref.
Minister of Justice and Interior (Note: On 6 May 1994, the Ministry of the Interior was disestablished and its competences transferred to the newly-established Ministry of Justice and Interior.)	Juan Alberto Belloch	Independent	6 May 1994	6 May 1996	
~~Minister of the Interior~~	Disestablished on 6 May 1994.				
Minister of Agriculture, Fisheries and Food	Luis María Atienza	PSOE	6 May 1994	6 May 1996	
=== Changes July 1995 ===
Portfolio	Name	Party	Took office	Left office	Ref.
Deputy Prime Minister	Vacant from 2 July 1995. (Note: Narcís Serra and Julián García Vargas tendered their resignations respectively as Deputy Prime Minister and Minister of Defence on 13 June 1995, which were accepted by Felipe González on 28 June and formalized on 2 July.)				
Minister of Defence	Gustavo Suárez Pertierra	PSOE	3 July 1995	6 May 1996	
Minister of Education and Science	Jerónimo Saavedra	PSOE	3 July 1995	6 May 1996	
Minister for Public Administrations	Joan Lerma	PSOE	3 July 1995	6 May 1996	
=== Changes December 1995 ===
Portfolio	Name	Party	Took office	Left office	Ref.
Minister of Foreign Affairs	Carlos Westendorp	PSOE	19 December 1995	6 May 1996	

== Departmental structure ==
Felipe González's fourth government was organised into several superior and governing units, whose number, powers and hierarchical structure varied depending on the ministerial department.

Unit/body rank

- (■) Secretary of state
- (■) Undersecretary
- (■) Director-general
- (●) Autonomous agency
- (◆) Military & intelligence agency

Office (Original name)	Portrait	Name	Took office	Left office	Alliance/party	Ref.
=== Prime Minister's Office ===
Prime Minister (Presidencia del Gobierno)		Felipe González	13 July 1993	5 May 1996	PSOE	
Prime Minister (Presidencia del Gobierno)	14 July 1993 – 11 May 1996: (■) Cabinet of the Prime Minister's Office–Chief of Staff; (■) Deputy Chief of Staff; (■) Department of Institutional Affairs; (■) Department of Economy; (■) Department of Socio-labour Affairs; (■) Department of International Affairs; (■) Department of Education and Culture; (■) Department of Analysis; (■) Department of Defence and Security; (■) Department of Studies; (■) Department of Infrastructure and Monitoring for Crisis Situations; (■) General Secretariat of the Prime Minister's Office (est. 21 Jul 1993)					
Deputy Prime Minister (Vicepresidencia del Gobierno)		Narcís Serra	14 July 1993	2 July 1995 (resigned)	PSOE (PSC–PSOE)	
Deputy Prime Minister (Vicepresidencia del Gobierno)	16 December 1989 – 31 July 1995: (■) General Secretariat of the Deputy Prime Minister's Office					
=== Ministry of Foreign Affairs ===
Ministry of Foreign Affairs (Ministerio de Asuntos Exteriores)		Javier Solana	14 July 1993	19 December 1995	PSOE	
Ministry of Foreign Affairs (Ministerio de Asuntos Exteriores)		Carlos Westendorp	19 December 1995	6 May 1996	PSOE	
Ministry of Foreign Affairs (Ministerio de Asuntos Exteriores)	24 December 1988 – 11 May 1996: (■) State Secretariat for the European Communities (until 23 Dec 1995) / State Secretariat for the European Union (from 23 Dec 1995); (■) General Secretariat for the European Communities (until 23 Dec 1995) / General Secretariat for the European Union (from 23 Dec 1995); (■) Directorate-General for Community Technical Coordination (disest. 23 Dec 1995); (■) Directorate-General for Community Legal and Institutional Coordination (disest. 23 Dec 1995); (■) Directorate-General for Technical Coordination of European Union Affairs (est. 23 Dec 1995); (■) Directorate-General for Legal and Institutional Coordination of European Union Affairs (est. 23 Dec 1995); (■) State Secretariat for International Cooperation and for Ibero-America; (■) Directorate-General for International Economic Relations; (■) Directorate-General for Cultural and Scientific Relations; (■) Undersecretariat of Foreign Affairs; (■) Technical General Secretariat; (■) Directorate-General for the Foreign Service; (■) Directorate-General for Consular Affairs; (■) General Secretariat for Foreign Policy; (■) Directorate-General for Political Affairs (est. 12 Sep 1993); (■) Directorate-General for Foreign Policy for Europe; (■) Directorate-General for Foreign Policy for Ibero-America; (■) Directorate-General for Foreign Policy for North America and Asia; (■) Directorate-General for Foreign Policy for Africa and the Middle East; (■) Directorate-General for International Organizations and Conferences; (■) Directorate-General for International Affairs of Security and Disarmament; (■) Service for Protocol, Chancery and Orders–First Introducer of Ambassadors; (■) Directorate-General of the Office for Diplomatic Information					
=== Ministry of Justice ===
Ministry of Justice (Ministerio de Justicia) (until 6 May 1994) Ministry of Justice and Interior (Ministerio de Justicia e Interior) (from 6 May 1994)		Juan Alberto Belloch	14 July 1993	6 May 1996	PSOE (Independent)	
Ministry of Justice (Ministerio de Justicia) (until 6 May 1994) Ministry of Justice and Interior (Ministerio de Justicia e Interior) (from 6 May 1994)	27 July 1993 – 15 May 1994: (■) State Secretariat for Penitentiary Affairs; (■) Directorate-General for Penitentiary Institutions; (■) Directorate-General for Penitentiary Administration; (■) Undersecretariat of Justice; (■) Technical General Secretariat; (■) Directorate-General for Services; (■) Directorate-General for Relations with the Administration of Justice; (■) Directorate-General for Religious Affairs and Conscientious Objection (disest. 20 Mar 1994); (■) Directorate-General for Religious Affairs (est. 20 Mar 1994); (■) Directorate-General for Registries and Notaries; (■) Directorate-General of the State Legal Service; (■) Directorate-General for Conscientious Objection (est. 20 Mar 1994)					
=== Ministry of Defence ===
Ministry of Defence (Ministerio de Defensa)		Julián García Vargas	14 July 1993	2 July 1995 (resigned)	PSOE	
Ministry of Defence (Ministerio de Defensa)		Gustavo Suárez Pertierra	3 July 1995	6 May 1996	PSOE	
=== Ministry of Economy and Finance ===
Ministry of Economy and Finance (Ministerio de Economía y Hacienda)		Pedro Solbes	14 July 1993	6 May 1996	PSOE (Independent)	
Ministry of Economy and Finance (Ministerio de Economía y Hacienda)	14 May 1991 – 3 October 1993: (■) State Secretariat for Finance; (■) General Secretariat for Planning and Budgets; (■) Directorate-General for Planning; (■) Directorate-General for Budgets; (■) Office of the Comptroller General of the State Administration; (■) Directorate-General for Budget Informatics; (■) Directorate-General for Personnel Expenditures and Public Pensions; (■) Directorate-General for Taxes; (■) Directorate-General for Coordination with the Territorial Treasuries; (■) State Secretariat for Economy; (■) General Secretariat for International Economy and Competition; (■) Directorate-General for Forecast and Conjuncture; (■) Directorate-General for Regional Economic Incentives; (■) Directorate-General for Competition Defence; (■) Directorate-General for Foreign Transactions; (■) Directorate-General for the Treasury and Financial Policy; (■) Directorate-General for Insurance; (■) Directorate-General for Economic Policy; (■) Undersecretariat of Economy and Finance; (■) Directorate-General for Services; (■) Technical General Secretariat; (■) Directorate-General for the State Heritage; (■) Inspectorate-General of the Ministry of Economy and Finance; 3 October 1993 – 8 May 1996: (■) State Secretariat for Finance; (■) General Secretariat for Planning and Budgets; (■) Directorate-General for Planning; (■) Directorate-General for Budgets; (■) Office of the Comptroller General of the State Administration; (■) Directorate-General for Budget Informatics; (■) Directorate-General for Personnel Expenditures and Public Pensions; (■) Directorate-General for Taxes; (■) Directorate-General for Coordination with the Territorial Treasuries; (■) Directorate-General of the Centre for Cadastral Management and Tax Cooperation; (■) State Secretariat for Economy; (■) Directorate-General for the Treasury and Financial Policy; (■) Directorate-General for Insurance; (■) Directorate-General for Economic Policy; (■) Directorate-General for Forecast and Conjuncture; (■) Directorate-General for Regional Economic Incentives; (■) Directorate-General for Competition Defence; (■) Directorate-General for International Economy and Foreign Transactions; (■) Undersecretariat of Economy and Finance; (■) Directorate-General for Services; (■) Technical General Secretariat; (■) Directorate-General for the State Heritage; (■) Inspectorate-General of the Ministry of Economy and Finance					
=== Ministry of the Interior ===
Ministry of the Interior (Ministerio del Interior) (until 6 May 1994)		José Luis Corcuera	14 July 1993	24 November 1993 (resigned)	PSOE	
Ministry of the Interior (Ministerio del Interior) (until 6 May 1994)		Antoni Asunción	25 November 1993	4 May 1994 (resigned)	PSOE	
=== Ministry of Public Works, Transport and Environment ===
Ministry of Public Works, Transport and Environment (Ministerio de Obras Públicas, Transportes y Medio Ambiente)		Josep Borrell	14 July 1993	6 May 1996	PSOE	
=== Ministry of Education and Science ===
Ministry of Education and Science (Ministerio de Educación y Ciencia)		Gustavo Suárez Pertierra	14 July 1993	3 July 1995	PSOE	
Ministry of Education and Science (Ministerio de Educación y Ciencia)		Jerónimo Saavedra	3 July 1995	6 May 1996	PSOE	
Ministry of Education and Science (Ministerio de Educación y Ciencia)	(●) High Council for Sports; (■) President's Office of the High Council for Sports; (■) Directorate-General for Sports; (■) Directorate-General for Sports Infrastructure and Services					
=== Ministry of Labour and Social Security ===
Ministry of Labour and Social Security (Ministerio de Trabajo y Seguridad Social)		José Antonio Griñán	14 July 1993	6 May 1996	PSOE	
Ministry of Labour and Social Security (Ministerio de Trabajo y Seguridad Social)	14 July 1993 – 11 May 1996: (■) Undersecretariat of Labour and Social Security; (■) Technical General Secretariat; (■) Directorate-General for Services; (■) Directorate-General for Personnel; (■) Directorate-General for Labour and Social Security Inspection; (■) Directorate-General for Informatics and Statistics; (■) General Secretariat for Employment and Labour Relations; (■) Directorate-General for Labour; (■) Directorate-General for Employment; (■) General Secretariat for Social Security; (■) Directorate-General for Economic Planning and Management of the Social Security; (■) Directorate-General for Legal Planning and Collaborating Entities of the Social Security; (■) Office of the Comptroller General of the Social Security					
=== Ministry of Industry and Energy ===
Ministry of Industry and Energy (Ministerio de Industria y Energía)		Juan Manuel Eguiagaray	14 July 1993	6 May 1996	PSOE	
=== Ministry of Agriculture, Fisheries and Food ===
Ministry of Agriculture, Fisheries and Food (Ministerio de Agricultura, Pesca y Alimentación)		Vicente Albero	14 July 1993	4 May 1994 (resigned)	PSOE	
Ministry of Agriculture, Fisheries and Food (Ministerio de Agricultura, Pesca y Alimentación)		Luis María Atienza	6 May 1994	6 May 1996	PSOE	
=== Ministry of the Presidency ===
Ministry of the Presidency (Ministerio de la Presidencia)		Alfredo Pérez Rubalcaba	14 July 1993	6 May 1996	PSOE	
Ministry of the Presidency (Ministerio de la Presidencia)	14 July – 6 September 1993: (■) Undersecretariat of Relations with the Cortes and the Government Secretariat; (■) Undersecretariat of the Spokesperson of the Government; (■) Technical Directorate-General and for Services; (■) Directorate-General for Information Relations; (■) Directorate-General for Information Cooperation; (■) General Secretariat for Coordination and Services of the Prime Minister's Office; (■) Chief of Protocol of the State; (■) Chief of Protocol of the Prime Minister's Office; (■) Chief of Operational Resources of the Prime Minister's Office; (■) Chief of Security of the Prime Minister's Office; (■) Directorate-General for Relations with the Cortes; (■) Directorate-General for Monitoring of Parliamentary Initiatives; (■) Directorate-General of the Government Secretariat; (■) Technical General Secretariat; (■) Directorate-General for Services; 6 September 1993 – 8 May 1996: (■) Undersecretariat of the Presidency; (■) Chief of Protocol of the State; (■) Chief of Protocol of the Prime Minister's Office; (■) Directorate-General of the Government Secretariat; (■) Technical General Secretariat; (■) Directorate-General for Services; (■) Chief of Security of the Prime Minister's Office; (■) General Secretariat of Relations with the Cortes; (■) Directorate-General for Relations with the Congress of Deputies; (■) Directorate-General for Relations with the Senate; (■) General Secretariat of the Spokesperson of the Government; (■) Directorate-General for Information Relations (disest. 6 Aug 1994); (■) Directorate-General for Communication (est. 6 Aug 1994); (■) Directorate-General for Information Cooperation					
=== Ministry for Public Administrations ===
Ministry for Public Administrations (Ministerio para las Administraciones; Públicas)		Jerónimo Saavedra	14 July 1993	3 July 1995	PSOE	
Ministry for Public Administrations (Ministerio para las Administraciones; Públicas)		Joan Lerma	3 July 1995	6 May 1996	PSOE	
=== Ministry of Culture ===
Ministry of Culture (Ministerio de Cultura)		Carmen Alborch	14 July 1993	6 May 1996	PSOE (Independent)	
Ministry of Culture (Ministerio de Cultura)	23 July 1988 – 21 October 1993: (■) Undersecretariat of Culture; (■) Technical General Secretariat; (■) Directorate-General for Fine Arts and Archives; (■) Directorate-General for Books and Libraries; (■) Directorate-General for Cultural Cooperation; 21 October 1993 – 11 May 1996: (■) Undersecretariat of Culture; (■) Directorate-General for Services; (■) Technical General Secretariat; (■) Directorate-General for Fine Arts and Archives (disest. 21 Oct 1994); (■) Directorate-General for Books and Libraries (disest. 21 Oct 1994); (■) Directorate-General for Fine Arts and Conservation and Restoration of Cultural Property (est. 21 Oct 1994); (■) Directorate-General for Books, Archives and Libraries (est. 21 Oct 1994); (■) Directorate-General for Cultural Cooperation					
=== Ministry of Health and Consumer Affairs ===
Ministry of Health and Consumer Affairs (Ministerio de Sanidad y Consumo)		Ángeles Amador	14 July 1993	6 May 1996	PSOE (Independent)	
=== Ministry of Social Affairs ===
Ministry of Social Affairs (Ministerio de Asuntos Sociales)		Cristina Alberdi	14 July 1993	6 May 1996	PSOE (PSOE from Oct 1995; Indep. until Oct 1995)	
Ministry of Social Affairs (Ministerio de Asuntos Sociales)	14 July – 5 December 1993: (■) Undersecretariat of Social Affairs; (■) Technical Directorate-General and for Services; (■) Directorate-General for Social Action; (■) Directorate-General for the Legal Protection of Minors; (■) Government Delegation for the National Plan on Drugs; (■) Directorate-General for Migration; 5 December 1993 – 11 May 1996: (■) Government Delegation for the National Plan on Drugs; (■) Directorate-General for the National Plan on Drugs; (■) Undersecretariat of Social Affairs; (■) Technical General Secretariat; (■) Directorate-General for Services; (■) Directorate-General for Social Action; (■) Directorate-General for the Legal Protection of Minors (disest. 4 Dec 1994); (■) Directorate-General for Minors and Family (est. 4 Dec 1994); (■) Directorate-General for Migration					
=== Ministry of Trade and Tourism ===
Ministry of Trade and Tourism (Ministerio de Comercio y Turismo)		Javier Gómez-Navarro	14 July 1993	6 May 1996	PSOE (Independent)	
=== Spokesperson of the Government ===
Spokesperson of the Government (Portavoz del Gobierno)		Alfredo Pérez Rubalcaba	14 July 1993	6 May 1996	PSOE	

== See also ==
- Governments of Felipe González

== Notes ==
Preceded by González III	Government of Spain; 1993–1996	Succeeded by Aznar I
