= Government of Felipe González =

Government of Felipe González may refer to:

- First government of Felipe González (1982–1986)
- Second government of Felipe González (1986–1989)
- Third government of Felipe González (1989–1993)
- Fourth government of Felipe González (1993–1996)
