= González government =

The term González government may refer to:

- González I Government, the government of Spain under Felipe González from 1982 to 1986.
- González II Government, the government of Spain under Felipe González from 1986 to 1989.
- González III Government, the government of Spain under Felipe González from 1989 to 1993.
- González IV Government, the government of Spain under Felipe González from 1993 to 1996.
