= List of ministers of defence (Spain) =

Ministerial position for the Spanish military

Minister of Defence
- Ministro de Defensa de España
- National Emblem

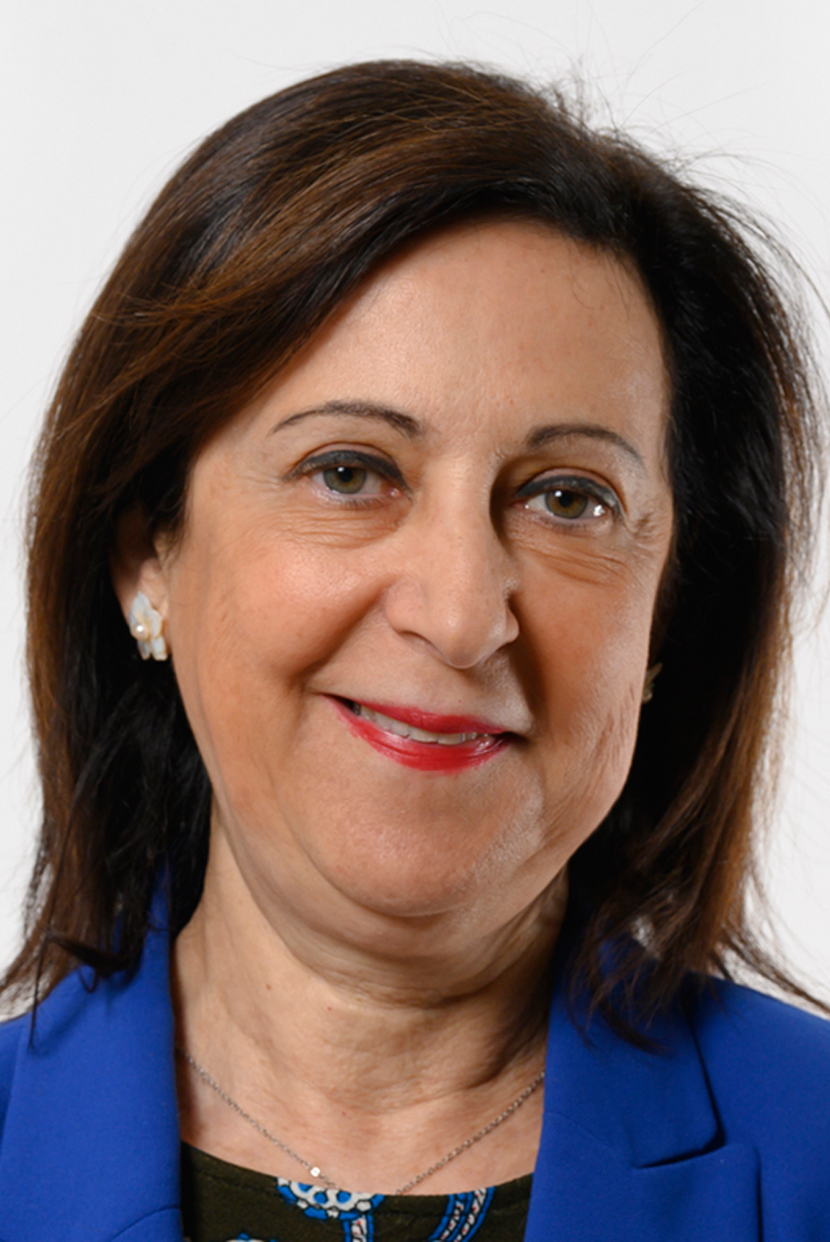
- Incumbent; Margarita Robles since 7 June 2018
- Ministry of Defence
- Style: Mr./Ms. Minister (informal); The Most Excellent (formal)
- Status: Head of a ministry
- Abbreviation: MINISDEF
- Member of: Council of Ministers; National Security Council; National Defence Council
- Reports to: Prime Minister
- Residence: Ministry of Defense HQ, 11th floor
- Seat: Ministry of Defense Headquarters; Madrid
- Nominator: Prime Minister
- Appointer: Monarch; countersigned by the Prime Minister
- Term length: No term fixed
- Precursor: Minister of War; Minister of the Navy; Minister of the Air
- Formation: 17 May 1937
- First holder: Indalecio Prieto as Minister of National Defence

The minister of defence is the highest authority of Spain's Ministry of Defence, which is in charge of the preparation, development and execution of the defense policy determined by its government, as well as the management of the Military Administration.

== List of officeholders ==
=== Second Spanish Republic (1931–1939) ===
No.	Portrait	Name (born–died)	Term of office			Political party	Government	Ref.
No.	Portrait	Name (born–died)	Took office	Left office	Time in office	Political party	Government	Ref.
Minister of National Defence
1		Indalecio Prieto (1883–1962)	17 May 1937	5 April 1938	323 days	PSOE	Negrín I	
2		Juan Negrín (1892–1956)	5 April 1938	6 March 1939	360 days	PSOE	Negrín II	

=== Francoist Spain (1936–1975) ===
No.	Portrait	Name (born–died)	Term of office			Political party	Government	Ref.
No.	Portrait	Name (born–died)	Took office	Left office	Time in office	Political party	Government	Ref.
Minister of National Defence
1		Fidel Dávila Arrondo (1878–1962)	31 January 1938	9 August 1939	360 days	Military	Franco I	
Split into Minister of the Army, Minister of the Navy and Minister of the Air

=== Kingdom of Spain (1975–present) ===
No.	Portrait	Name (born–died)	Term of office			Political party	Government	Ref.
No.	Portrait	Name (born–died)	Took office	Left office	Time in office	Political party	Government	Ref.
Minister of Defence
Reign of Juan Carlos I (1975–2014)
1		Manuel Gutiérrez Mellado (1912–1995)	4 July 1977	5 April 1979	1 year, 275 days	Military	Suárez II	
2		Agustín Rodríguez Sahagún (1932–1991)	6 April 1979	27 February 1981	1 year, 327 days	UCD	Suárez III	
3		Alberto Oliart (1928–2021)	26 February 1981	3 December 1982	1 year, 280 days	UCD	Calvo-Sotelo	
4		Narcís Serra (born 1943)	3 December 1982	12 March 1991	8 years, 99 days	PSOE	González I–II–III	
5		Julián García Vargas (1945–2026)	12 March 1991	3 July 1995	4 years, 113 days	PSOE	González III–IV	
6		Gustavo Suárez Pertierra (born 1949)	3 July 1995	5 May 1996	307 days	PSOE	González IV	
7		Eduardo Serra Rexach (born 1946)	5 May 1996	27 April 2000	3 years, 358 days	Independent	Aznar I	
8		Federico Trillo (born 1952)	28 April 2000	18 April 2004	3 years, 356 days	PP	Aznar II	
9		José Bono (born 1950)	18 April 2004	7 April 2006	1 year, 354 days	PSOE	Zapatero I	
10		José Antonio Alonso (1960–2017)	7 April 2006	14 April 2008	2 years, 7 days	PSOE	Zapatero I	
11		Carme Chacón (1971–2017)	14 April 2008 (Note: Interior Minister Alfredo Pérez Rubalcaba temporarily took over the defense portfolio when Chacón gave birth.)	22 December 2011	3 years, 252 days	PSOE	Zapatero II	
12		Pedro Morenés (born 1948)	22 December 2011	19 June 2014	2 years, 179 days	Independent	Rajoy I	
Reign of Felipe VI (2014–present)
12		Pedro Morenés (born 1948)	19 June 2014	4 November 2016	2 years, 138 days	Independent	Rajoy I	
13		María Dolores de Cospedal (born 1965)	4 November 2016	1 June 2018	1 year, 209 days	PP	Rajoy II	
14		Margarita Robles (born 1956)	7 June 2018	Incumbent	8 years, 134 days	Independent	Sánchez I–II–III	

== See also ==
- Ministry of Defence (Spain)

== Notes and references ==
Notes
