= Third government of Felipe González =

1989–1993 government of Spain

3rd government of Felipe González
- Government of Spain
- 1989–1993
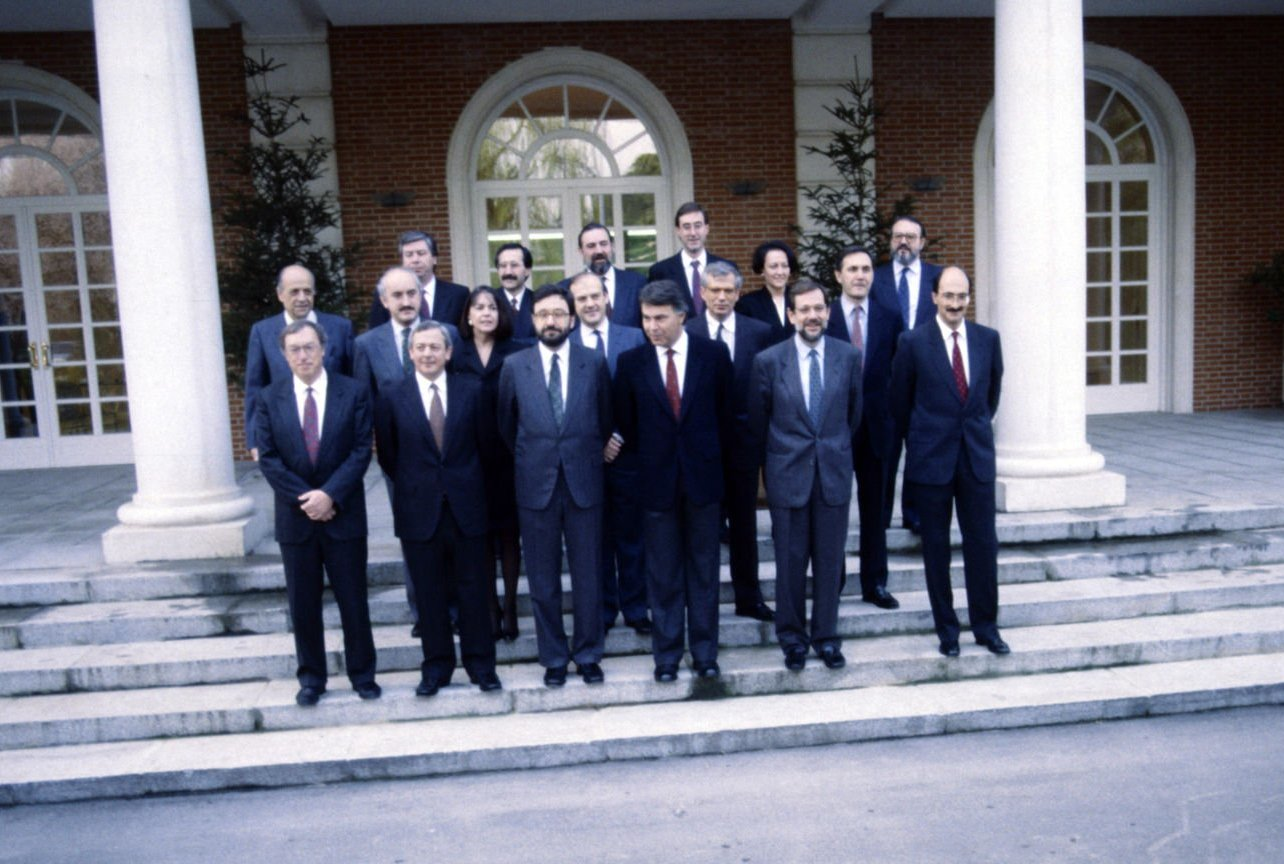
- The government in March 1991
- Date formed: 7 December 1989
- Date dissolved: 14 July 1993

People and organisations
- Monarch: Juan Carlos I
- Prime Minister: Felipe González
- Deputy Prime Minister: Alfonso Guerra (1989–1991); Narcís Serra (1991–1993)
- No. of ministers: 18 (Note: Does not include the prime minister.) (1989–1991); 17 (1991–1993)
- Total no. of members: 28
- Member party: PSOE
- Status in legislature: Minority (single-party) (Note: As a result of Herri Batasuna's policy of abstentionism, the PSOE was able to govern as a de facto majority government.)
- Opposition party: PP
- Opposition leader: José María Aznar

History
- Election: 1989 general election
- Outgoing election: 1993 general election
- Legislature term: 4th Cortes Generales
- Budget: 1990, 1991, 1992, 1993
- Predecessor: González II
- Successor: González IV

The third government of Felipe González was formed on 7 December 1989, following the latter's election as prime minister of Spain by the Congress of Deputies on 5 December and his swearing-in on 6 December, as a result of the Spanish Socialist Workers' Party (PSOE) emerging as the largest parliamentary force at the 1989 Spanish general election. It succeeded the second González government and was the government of Spain from 7 December 1989 to 14 July 1993, a total of 1,315 days, or 3 years, 7 months and 7 days.

González formed a continuity government, maintaining the same composition of the preceding cabinet as established in 1988. This came as a consequence of the pending legal challenges on election results in some constituencies sparking an apparent "provisionality feeling" on the new government, a situation which had already led to an unprecedented investiture session with 18 deputies being prevented by judicial courts from taking their offices. The government included two members of the Socialists' Party of Catalonia (PSC)—initially Narcís Serra, later joined by Jordi Solé Tura—and four independents (Claudio Aranzadi, Jorge Semprún and Rosa Conde—who would end up joining the PSOE in November 1990—as well as Pedro Solbes from March 1991).

The government was automatically dismissed on 7 June 1993 as a consequence of the 1993 general election, but remained in acting capacity until the next government was sworn in.

== Investiture ==
Investiture; Congress of Deputies; Nomination of Felipe González (PSOE)
Ballot →	5 December 1989
Required majority →	167 out of 332
Yes: • PSOE (166); • AIC (1)	167 / 332
No: • PP (99); • CiU (18); • IU–IC (17); • CDS (13); • PA (2); • UV (2); • EA (2); • EE (2)	155 / 332
Abstentions: • PNV (5); • PAR (1)	6 / 332
Absentees: • HB (4)	4 / 332

== Votes of confidence/no confidence ==
Motion of confidence Congress of Deputies; General Policy Statement (Prime Minister)
Ballot →	5 April 1990
Required majority →	Simple
Yes: • PSOE (175); • AIC (1)	176 / 350
No: • PP (105); • IU–IC (16); • PA (2); • UV (2); • EA (2); • EE (2); • PAR (1)	130 / 350
Abstentions: • CiU (18); • CDS (14); • PNV (5)	37 / 350
Absentees: • HB (4); • PP (2); • IU–IC (1)	7 / 350

== Cabinet changes ==
González's third government saw a number of cabinet changes during its tenure:

- On 19 April 1990, Minister of Labour and Social Security Manuel Chaves was nominated to lead the Spanish Socialist Workers' Party (PSOE) into the 1990 Andalusian regional election. This led to a limited cabinet reshuffle, seeing Luis Martínez Noval replacing Chaves in his ministry post on 2 May.
- On 12 January 1991, Alfonso Guerra announced his resignation as Deputy Prime Minister of Spain, effective on 14 January, as a result of a political and financial scandal involving his brother Juan Guerra and which had been ongoing for over a year; but also after a stark erosion in the relationship with Prime Minister Felipe González had seen Guerra's standing in government weaken. González used the opportunity of Guerra's resignation to arrange a major cabinet reshuffle, which was materialized in March 1991. The reshuffle saw Narcís Serra becoming new Deputy Prime Minister; the incorporation of Tomás de la Quadra-Salcedo (Justice), Josep Borrell (Public Works and Transport), Pedro Solbes (Agriculture, Fisheries and Food), Juan Manuel Eguiagaray (Public Administrations), Jordi Solé Tura (Culture) and Julián García Valverde (Health and Consumer Affairs); the farewell of Enrique Múgica, Javier Sáenz de Cosculluela, Carlos Romero, Joaquín Almunia and Jorge Semprún; Julián García Vargas becoming new Minister of Defence succeeding Serra and the split up of José Barrionuevo's Transport, Tourism and Communications ministry between the Public Works and Industry departments. Of the new incorporations, Jordi Solé Tura was a member from the Socialists' Party of Catalonia (PSC) since 1988, whereas Pedro Solbes was an independent.
- On 10 January 1992, Julián García Valverde submitted his resignation as Minister of Health and Consumer Affairs as a result of alleged embezzlement and tax fraud accusations during Valverde's time as president of Renfe between 1985 and 1991. Felipe González accepted Valverde's resignation on 13 January and appointed José Antonio Griñán as a replacement.
- On 16 June 1992, Felipe González accepted Francisco Fernández Ordóñez's resignation as Minister of Foreign Affairs because of a deteriorating health resulting from the cancer affection he had been developing since 1988. Ordóñez had been on leave of absence since 31 May as a result of a physical impossibility to keep on his duties as minister, being replaced in his post by Javier Solana on 24 June; in turn, Solana was replaced in the Education portfolio by Alfredo Pérez Rubalcaba. Fernández Ordóñez died on 7 August 1992, only a month and a half after his resignation.

== Council of Ministers ==
The Council of Ministers was structured into the offices for the prime minister, the deputy prime minister and 17 ministries, including the ministry for the spokesperson of the Government. The number of ministries was reduced to 16 after the Transport, Tourism and Communications portfolio was split and merged into the Public Works and Urbanism and Industry and Energy ministries in March 1991. The office of the deputy prime minister was left vacant from January to March 1991.

← González III Government → (7 December 1989 – 14 July 1993)
Portfolio	Name	Party	Took office	Left office	Ref.
Prime Minister	Felipe González	PSOE	6 December 1989	13 July 1993	
Deputy Prime Minister	Alfonso Guerra	PSOE	7 December 1989	14 January 1991	
Minister of Foreign Affairs	Francisco Fernández Ordóñez	PSOE	7 December 1989	16 June 1992	
Minister of Justice	Enrique Múgica	PSOE	7 December 1989	13 March 1991	
Minister of Defence	Narcís Serra	PSOE^{/PSC}	7 December 1989	13 March 1991	
Minister of Economy and Finance	Carlos Solchaga	PSOE	7 December 1989	14 July 1993	
Minister of the Interior	José Luis Corcuera	PSOE	7 December 1989	14 July 1993	
Minister of Public Works and Urbanism	Javier Sáenz de Cosculluela	PSOE	7 December 1989	13 March 1991	
Minister of Education and Science	Javier Solana	PSOE	7 December 1989	24 June 1992	
Minister of Labour and Social Security	Manuel Chaves	PSOE	7 December 1989	2 May 1990	
Minister of Industry and Energy	Claudio Aranzadi	Independent	7 December 1989	13 March 1991	
Minister of Agriculture, Fisheries and Food	Carlos Romero	PSOE	7 December 1989	13 March 1991	
Minister for Public Administrations	Joaquín Almunia	PSOE	7 December 1989	13 March 1991	
Minister of Transport, Tourism and Communications	José Barrionuevo	PSOE	7 December 1989	13 March 1991	
Minister of Culture	Jorge Semprún	Independent	7 December 1989	13 March 1991	
Minister of Health and Consumer Affairs	Julián García Vargas	PSOE	7 December 1989	13 March 1991	
Minister of Relations with the Cortes and the Government Secretariat	Virgilio Zapatero	PSOE	7 December 1989	14 July 1993	
Minister of Social Affairs	Matilde Fernández	PSOE	7 December 1989	14 July 1993	
Spokesperson Minister of the Government	Rosa Conde	Independent (Note: Joined the PSOE in November 1990.)	7 December 1989	14 July 1993	
=== Changes May 1990 ===
Portfolio	Name	Party	Took office	Left office	Ref.
Minister of Labour and Social Security	Luis Martínez Noval	PSOE	2 May 1990	14 July 1993	
=== Changes January 1991 ===
Portfolio	Name	Party	Took office	Left office	Ref.
Deputy Prime Minister	Vacant from 14 January to 13 March 1991.				
=== Changes March 1991 ===
Portfolio	Name	Party	Took office	Left office	Ref.
Deputy Prime Minister	Narcís Serra	PSOE^{/PSC}	13 March 1991	14 July 1993	
Minister of Justice	Tomás de la Quadra-Salcedo	PSOE	13 March 1991	14 July 1993	
Minister of Defence	Julián García Vargas	PSOE	13 March 1991	14 July 1993	
Minister of Public Works and Transport (Note: On 13 March 1991, the ministries of Public Works and Urbanism and Industry and Energy were reorganized as the Public Works and Transport and Industry, Trade and Tourism departments, respectively. Concurrently, the Ministry of Transport, Tourism and Communications was disestablished and its competences transferred to the Public Works and Transport (Transport and Communications) and Industry, Trade and Tourism (Tourism) departments.)	Josep Borrell	PSOE	13 March 1991	14 July 1993	
Minister of Industry, Trade and Tourism	Claudio Aranzadi	Independent	13 March 1991	14 July 1993	
Minister of Agriculture, Fisheries and Food	Pedro Solbes	Independent	13 March 1991	14 July 1993	
Minister for Public Administrations	Juan Manuel Eguiagaray	PSOE	13 March 1991	14 July 1993	
~~Minister of Transport, Tourism and Communications~~	Disestablished on 13 March 1991.				
Minister of Culture	Jordi Solé Tura	PSOE^{/PSC}	13 March 1991	14 July 1993	
Minister of Health and Consumer Affairs	Julián García Valverde	PSOE	13 March 1991	13 January 1992	
=== Changes January 1992 ===
Portfolio	Name	Party	Took office	Left office	Ref.
Minister of Health and Consumer Affairs	José Antonio Griñán	PSOE	15 January 1992	14 July 1993	
=== Changes June 1992 ===
Portfolio	Name	Party	Took office	Left office	Ref.
Minister of Foreign Affairs	Javier Solana	PSOE	24 June 1992	14 July 1993	
Minister of Education and Science	Alfredo Pérez Rubalcaba	PSOE	24 June 1992	14 July 1993	

== Departmental structure ==
Felipe González's third government was organised into several superior and governing units, whose number, powers and hierarchical structure varied depending on the ministerial department.

Unit/body rank

- (■) Secretary of state
- (■) Undersecretary
- (■) Director-general
- (●) Autonomous agency
- (◆) Military & intelligence agency

Office (Original name)	Portrait	Name	Took office	Left office	Alliance/party	Ref.
=== Prime Minister's Office ===
Prime Minister (Presidencia del Gobierno)		Felipe González	6 December 1989	13 July 1993	PSOE	
Prime Minister (Presidencia del Gobierno)	16 December 1989 – 7 May 1991: (■) Cabinet of the Prime Minister's Office–Chief of Staff; (■) Deputy Chief of Staff; (■) Department of Institutional Affairs; (■) Department of Economy; (■) Department of Socio-labour Affairs; (■) Department of International Affairs; (■) Department of Education and Culture; (■) Department of Analysis; (■) Department of Defence and Security; (■) Department of Studies; (■) Department of Infrastructure and Monitoring for Crisis Situations; (■) General Secretariat of the Prime Minister's Office; (■) Chief of Protocol of the State; (■) Chief of Protocol of the Prime Minister's Office; (■) Chief of Security of the Prime Minister's Office; (■) Chief of Operational Resources of the Prime Minister's Office; 7 May 1991 – 14 July 1993: (■) Cabinet of the Prime Minister's Office–Chief of Staff; (■) Deputy Chief of Staff; (■) Department of Institutional Affairs; (■) Department of Economy; (■) Department of Socio-labour Affairs; (■) Department of International Affairs; (■) Department of Education and Culture; (■) Department of Analysis; (■) Department of Defence and Security; (■) Department of Studies; (■) Department of Infrastructure and Monitoring for Crisis Situations; (■) General Secretariat for Coordination and Services of the Prime Minister's Office; (■) Chief of Protocol of the State; (■) Chief of Protocol of the Prime Minister's Office; (■) Chief of Operational Resources of the Prime Minister's Office; (■) Chief of Security of the Prime Minister's Office					
Deputy Prime Minister (Vicepresidencia del Gobierno)		Alfonso Guerra	7 December 1989	14 January 1991 (resigned)	PSOE	
Deputy Prime Minister (Vicepresidencia del Gobierno)		Narcís Serra	13 March 1991	14 July 1993	PSOE (PSC–PSOE)	
Deputy Prime Minister (Vicepresidencia del Gobierno)	16 December 1989 – 31 July 1995: (■) General Secretariat of the Deputy Prime Minister's Office					
=== Ministry of Foreign Affairs ===
Ministry of Foreign Affairs (Ministerio de Asuntos Exteriores)		Francisco Fernández Ordóñez	7 December 1989	16 June 1992 (resigned)	PSOE	
Ministry of Foreign Affairs (Ministerio de Asuntos Exteriores)		Javier Solana	24 June 1992	14 July 1993	PSOE	
Ministry of Foreign Affairs (Ministerio de Asuntos Exteriores)	24 December 1988 – 11 May 1996: (■) State Secretariat for the European Communities; (■) General Secretariat for the European Communities; (■) Directorate-General for Community Technical Coordination; (■) Directorate-General for Community Legal and Institutional Coordination; (■) State Secretariat for International Cooperation and for Ibero-America; (■) Directorate-General for International Economic Relations; (■) Directorate-General for Cultural and Scientific Relations; (■) Undersecretariat of Foreign Affairs; (■) Technical General Secretariat; (■) Directorate-General for the Foreign Service; (■) Directorate-General for Consular Affairs; (■) General Secretariat for Foreign Policy; (■) Directorate-General for Foreign Policy for Europe; (■) Directorate-General for Foreign Policy for Ibero-America; (■) Directorate-General for Foreign Policy for North America and Asia; (■) Directorate-General for Foreign Policy for Africa and the Middle East; (■) Directorate-General for International Organizations and Conferences; (■) Directorate-General for International Affairs of Security and Disarmament; (■) Service for Protocol, Chancery and Orders–First Introducer of Ambassadors; (■) Directorate-General of the Office for Diplomatic Information					
=== Ministry of Justice ===
Ministry of Justice (Ministerio de Justicia)		Enrique Múgica	7 December 1989	13 March 1991	PSOE	
Ministry of Justice (Ministerio de Justicia)		Tomás de la Quadra-Salcedo	13 March 1991	14 July 1993	PSOE	
Ministry of Justice (Ministerio de Justicia)	17 August 1985 – 17 January 1991: (■) Undersecretariat of Justice; (■) Technical General Secretariat; (■) Directorate-General for Services; (■) Directorate-General for Relations with the Administration of Justice; (■) Directorate-General for Religious Affairs; (■) Directorate-General for Registries and Notaries; (■) Directorate-General for Penitentiary Institutions; (■) Directorate-General of the State Legal Service; 17 January 1991 – 27 July 1993: (■) Undersecretariat of Justice; (■) Technical General Secretariat; (■) Directorate-General for Services; (■) Directorate-General for Relations with the Administration of Justice; (■) Directorate-General for Religious Affairs (disest. 27 Mar 1992); (■) Directorate-General for Religious Affairs and Conscientious Objection (est. 27 Mar 1992); (■) Directorate-General for Registries and Notaries; (■) Directorate-General of the State Legal Service; (■) General Secretariat for Penitentiary Affairs; (■) Directorate-General for Penitentiary Institutions; (■) Directorate-General for Penitentiary Administration					
=== Ministry of Defence ===
Ministry of Defence (Ministerio de Defensa)		Narcís Serra	7 December 1989	13 March 1991	PSOE (PSC–PSOE)	
Ministry of Defence (Ministerio de Defensa)		Julián García Vargas	13 March 1991	14 July 1993	PSOE	
=== Ministry of Economy and Finance ===
Ministry of Economy and Finance (Ministerio de Economía y Hacienda)		Carlos Solchaga	7 December 1989	14 July 1993	PSOE	
Ministry of Economy and Finance (Ministerio de Economía y Hacienda)	22 February 1987 – 13 March 1991: (■) State Secretariat for Finance; (■) General Secretariat for Finance; (■) Directorate-General for Tax Management; (■) Directorate-General for Financial and Tax Inspection; (■) Directorate-General for Tax Collection; (■) Directorate-General for Customs and Special Taxes; (■) Directorate-General for Tax Informatics; (■) General Secretariat for Planning and Budgets; (■) Directorate-General for Planning; (■) Directorate-General for Budgets; (■) Office of the Comptroller General of the State Administration; (■) Directorate-General for Budget Informatics; (■) Directorate-General for Personnel Expenditures and Public Pensions; (■) Directorate-General for Taxes; (■) Directorate-General for Coordination with the Territorial Treasuries; (■) State Secretariat for Economy; (■) Directorate-General for Economic Policy; (■) Directorate-General for Forecast and Conjuncture; (■) Directorate-General for the Treasury and Financial Policy; (■) Directorate-General for Insurance; (■) Directorate-General for Regional Economic Incentives; (■) State Secretariat for Trade; (■) General Secretariat for Trade; (■) Directorate-General for Trade Policy; (■) Directorate-General for Foreign Trade; (■) Directorate-General for Foreign Transactions; (■) Directorate-General for Internal Trade; (■) Directorate-General for Competition Defence; (■) Undersecretariat of Economy and Finance; (■) Directorate-General for Services; (■) Technical General Secretariat; (■) Directorate-General for the State Heritage; (■) Inspectorate-General of the Ministry of Economy and Finance; 13 March – 14 May 1991: (■) State Secretariat for Finance; (■) General Secretariat for Finance; (■) Directorate-General for Tax Management; (■) Directorate-General for Financial and Tax Inspection; (■) Directorate-General for Tax Collection; (■) Directorate-General for Customs and Special Taxes; (■) Directorate-General for Tax Informatics; (■) General Secretariat for Planning and Budgets; (■) Directorate-General for Planning; (■) Directorate-General for Budgets; (■) Office of the Comptroller General of the State Administration; (■) Directorate-General for Budget Informatics; (■) Directorate-General for Personnel Expenditures and Public Pensions; (■) Directorate-General for Taxes; (■) Directorate-General for Coordination with the Territorial Treasuries; (■) State Secretariat for Economy; (■) Directorate-General for Economic Policy; (■) Directorate-General for Forecast and Conjuncture; (■) Directorate-General for the Treasury and Financial Policy; (■) Directorate-General for Insurance; (■) Directorate-General for Regional Economic Incentives; (■) Undersecretariat of Economy and Finance; (■) Directorate-General for Services; (■) Technical General Secretariat; (■) Directorate-General for the State Heritage; (■) Inspectorate-General of the Ministry of Economy and Finance; (■) Directorate-General for Foreign Transactions; (■) Directorate-General for Competition Defence; 14 May 1991 – 3 October 1993: (■) State Secretariat for Finance; (■) General Secretariat for Finance (disest. 1 Jan 1992); (■) Directorate-General for Tax Management (disest. 1 Jan 1992); (■) Directorate-General for Financial and Tax Inspection (disest. 1 Jan 1992); (■) Directorate-General for Tax Collection (disest. 1 Jan 1992); (■) Directorate-General for Customs and Special Taxes (disest. 1 Jan 1992); (■) Directorate-General for Tax Informatics (disest. 1 Jan 1992); (■) General Secretariat for Planning and Budgets; (■) Directorate-General for Planning; (■) Directorate-General for Budgets; (■) Office of the Comptroller General of the State Administration; (■) Directorate-General for Budget Informatics; (■) Directorate-General for Personnel Expenditures and Public Pensions; (■) Directorate-General for Taxes; (■) Directorate-General for Coordination with the Territorial Treasuries; (■) State Secretariat for Economy; (■) General Secretariat for International Economy and Competition; (■) Directorate-General for Forecast and Conjuncture; (■) Directorate-General for Regional Economic Incentives; (■) Directorate-General for Competition Defence; (■) Directorate-General for Foreign Transactions; (■) Directorate-General for the Treasury and Financial Policy; (■) Directorate-General for Insurance; (■) Directorate-General for Economic Policy; (■) Undersecretariat of Economy and Finance; (■) Directorate-General for Services; (■) Technical General Secretariat; (■) Directorate-General for the State Heritage; (■) Inspectorate-General of the Ministry of Economy and Finance					
=== Ministry of the Interior ===
Ministry of the Interior (Ministerio del Interior)		José Luis Corcuera	7 December 1989	14 July 1993	PSOE	
=== Ministry of Public Works ===
Ministry of Public Works and Urbanism (Ministerio de Obras Públicas y Urbanismo) (until 13 March 1991) Ministry of Public Works and Transport (Ministerio de Obras Públicas y Transportes) (from 13 March 1991)		Javier Sáenz de Cosculluela	7 December 1989	13 March 1991	PSOE	
Ministry of Public Works and Urbanism (Ministerio de Obras Públicas y Urbanismo) (until 13 March 1991) Ministry of Public Works and Transport (Ministerio de Obras Públicas y Transportes) (from 13 March 1991)		Josep Borrell	13 March 1991	14 July 1993	PSOE	
=== Ministry of Education and Science ===
Ministry of Education and Science (Ministerio de Educación y Ciencia)		Javier Solana	7 December 1989	24 June 1992	PSOE	
Ministry of Education and Science (Ministerio de Educación y Ciencia)		Alfredo Pérez Rubalcaba	24 June 1992	14 July 1993	PSOE	
Ministry of Education and Science (Ministerio de Educación y Ciencia)	(●) High Council for Sports; (■) President's Office of the High Council for Sports; (■) Directorate-General for Sports; (■) Directorate-General for Sports Infrastructure (disest. 18 Jul 1992); (■) Directorate-General for Sports Infrastructure and Services (est. 18 Jul 1992)					
=== Ministry of Labour and Social Security ===
Ministry of Labour and Social Security (Ministerio de Trabajo y Seguridad Social)		Manuel Chaves	7 December 1989	2 May 1990	PSOE	
Ministry of Labour and Social Security (Ministerio de Trabajo y Seguridad Social)		Luis Martínez Noval	2 May 1990	14 July 1993	PSOE	
Ministry of Labour and Social Security (Ministerio de Trabajo y Seguridad Social)	25 April 1985 – 14 July 1993: (■) Undersecretariat of Labour and Social Security; (■) Technical General Secretariat; (■) Directorate-General for Services; (■) Directorate-General for Personnel; (■) Directorate-General for Labour and Social Security Inspection; (■) Directorate-General for Informatics and Statistics; (■) Directorate-General of the Spanish Institute for Emigration (disest. 13 Oct 1991); (■) Directorate-General for Migration (est. 13 Oct 1991); (■) General Secretariat for Employment and Labour Relations; (■) Directorate-General for Labour; (■) Directorate-General for Employment; (■) Directorate-General for Cooperatives and Labour Relations (disest. 30 Dec 1991); (■) General Secretariat for Social Security; (■) Directorate-General for Economic Regime of the Social Security (disest. 20 Dec 1990); (■) Directorate-General for Legal Regime of the Social Security (disest. 20 Dec 1990); (■) Directorate-General for Economic Planning and Management of the Social Security (est. 20 Dec 1990); (■) Directorate-General for Legal Planning and Collaborating Entities of the Social Security (est. 20 Dec 1990); (■) Office of the Comptroller General of the Social Security					
=== Ministry of Industry ===
Ministry of Industry and Energy (Ministerio de Industria y Energía) (until 13 March 1991) Ministry of Industry, Trade and Tourism (Ministerio de Industria, Comercio y Turismo) (from 13 March 1991)		Claudio Aranzadi	7 December 1989	14 July 1993	PSOE (Independent)	
Ministry of Industry and Energy (Ministerio de Industria y Energía) (until 13 March 1991) Ministry of Industry, Trade and Tourism (Ministerio de Industria, Comercio y Turismo) (from 13 March 1991)	30 October 1988 – 13 March 1991: (■) Undersecretariat of Industry and Energy; (■) Technical General Secretariat; (■) Directorate-General for Services; (■) General Secretariat for Energy and Mineral Resources; (■) Directorate-General for Mines and Construction; (■) Directorate-General for Energy; (■) General Secretariat for Industrial Promotion and Technology; (■) Directorate-General for Electronics and New Technologies; (■) Directorate-General for Technological Policy; (■) Directorate-General for Industry; 13 March – 6 April 1991: (■) State Secretariat for Trade; (■) General Secretariat for Trade; (■) Directorate-General for Trade Policy; (■) Directorate-General for Foreign Trade; (■) Directorate-General for Internal Trade; (■) Undersecretariat of Industry and Energy; (■) Technical General Secretariat; (■) Directorate-General for Services; (■) General Secretariat for Energy and Mineral Resources; (■) Directorate-General for Mines and Construction; (■) Directorate-General for Energy; (■) General Secretariat for Industrial Promotion and Technology; (■) Directorate-General for Electronics and New Technologies; (■) Directorate-General for Technological Policy; (■) Directorate-General for Industry; 6 April 1991 – 14 July 1993: (■) State Secretariat for Industry; (■) General Secretariat for Industrial Promotion and Technology; (■) Directorate-General for Electronics and New Technologies; (■) Directorate-General for Technological Policy; (■) Directorate-General for Industry; (■) State Secretariat for Trade; (■) General Secretariat for Trade; (■) Directorate-General for Trade Policy; (■) Directorate-General for Foreign Trade; (■) Directorate-General for Foreign Investments; (■) Directorate-General for Internal Trade; (■) Undersecretariat of Industry, Trade and Tourism; (■) Technical General Secretariat; (■) Directorate-General for Services; (■) General Secretariat for Energy and Mineral Resources; (■) Directorate-General for Mines and Construction; (■) Directorate-General for Energy; (■) General Secretariat for Tourism					
=== Ministry of Agriculture, Fisheries and Food ===
Ministry of Agriculture, Fisheries and Food (Ministerio de Agricultura, Pesca y Alimentación)		Carlos Romero	7 December 1989	13 March 1991	PSOE	
Ministry of Agriculture, Fisheries and Food (Ministerio de Agricultura, Pesca y Alimentación)		Pedro Solbes	13 March 1991	14 July 1993	PSOE (Independent)	
=== Ministry for Public Administrations ===
Ministry for Public Administrations (Ministerio para las Administraciones; Públicas)		Joaquín Almunia	7 December 1989	13 March 1991	PSOE	
Ministry for Public Administrations (Ministerio para las Administraciones; Públicas)		Juan Manuel Eguiagaray	13 March 1991	14 July 1993	PSOE	
=== Ministry of Transport, Tourism and Communications ===
Ministry of Transport, Tourism and Communications (Ministerio de Transportes, Turismo y Comunicaciones) (until 13 March 1991)		José Barrionuevo	7 December 1989	13 March 1991	PSOE	
=== Ministry of Culture ===
Ministry of Culture (Ministerio de Cultura)		Jorge Semprún	7 December 1989	13 March 1991	PSOE (Independent)	
Ministry of Culture (Ministerio de Cultura)		Jordi Solé Tura	13 March 1991	14 July 1993	PSOE (PSC–PSOE)	
Ministry of Culture (Ministerio de Cultura)	23 July 1988 – 21 October 1993: (■) Undersecretariat of Culture; (■) Technical General Secretariat; (■) Directorate-General for Fine Arts and Archives; (■) Directorate-General for Books and Libraries; (■) Directorate-General for Cultural Cooperation					
=== Ministry of Health and Consumer Affairs ===
Ministry of Health and Consumer Affairs (Ministerio de Sanidad y Consumo)		Julián García Vargas	7 December 1989	13 March 1991	PSOE	
Ministry of Health and Consumer Affairs (Ministerio de Sanidad y Consumo)		Julián García Valverde	13 March 1991	13 January 1992 (resigned)	PSOE	
Ministry of Health and Consumer Affairs (Ministerio de Sanidad y Consumo)		José Antonio Griñán	15 January 1992	14 July 1993	PSOE	
=== Ministry of Relations with the Cortes and the Government Secretariat ===
Ministry of Relations with the Cortes and the Government; Secretariat (Ministerio de Relaciones con las Cortes y de la Secretaría del Gobierno)		Virgilio Zapatero	7 December 1989	14 July 1993	PSOE	
Ministry of Relations with the Cortes and the Government; Secretariat (Ministerio de Relaciones con las Cortes y de la Secretaría del Gobierno)	31 July 1987 – 14 July 1993: (■) Undersecretariat of Relations with the Cortes and the Government Secretariat; (■) Directorate-General for Relations with the Cortes; (■) Directorate-General for Monitoring of Parliamentary Initiatives; (■) Directorate-General of the Government Secretariat; (■) Technical General Secretariat; (■) Directorate-General for Services; (■) Directorate-General of the Centre for Sociological Research (disest. 30 Jun 1990); (■) Directorate-General for Social Communication Media (disest. 31 Oct 1991)					
=== Ministry of Social Affairs ===
Ministry of Social Affairs (Ministerio de Asuntos Sociales)		Matilde Fernández	7 December 1989	14 July 1993	PSOE	
Ministry of Social Affairs (Ministerio de Asuntos Sociales)	23 July 1988 – 14 July 1993: (■) Undersecretariat of Social Affairs; (■) Technical Directorate-General and for Services; (■) Directorate-General for Social Action; (■) Directorate-General for the Legal Protection of Minors					
=== Ministry of the Spokesperson of the Government ===
Ministry of the Spokesperson of the Government (Ministerio del Portavoz del Gobierno)		Rosa Conde	7 December 1989	14 July 1993	PSOE (PSOE from Nov 1990; Indep. until Nov 1990)	
Ministry of the Spokesperson of the Government (Ministerio del Portavoz del Gobierno)	30 July 1988 – 6 September 1993: (■) Undersecretariat of the Spokesperson of the Government; (■) Technical Directorate-General and for Services; (■) Directorate-General for Information Relations; (■) Directorate-General for Information Cooperation					

== See also ==
- Governments of Felipe González

== Notes ==
Preceded by González II	Government of Spain; 1989–1993	Succeeded by González IV
