= Eduardo Serra Rexach =

Spanish politician and businessman

Eduardo Serra
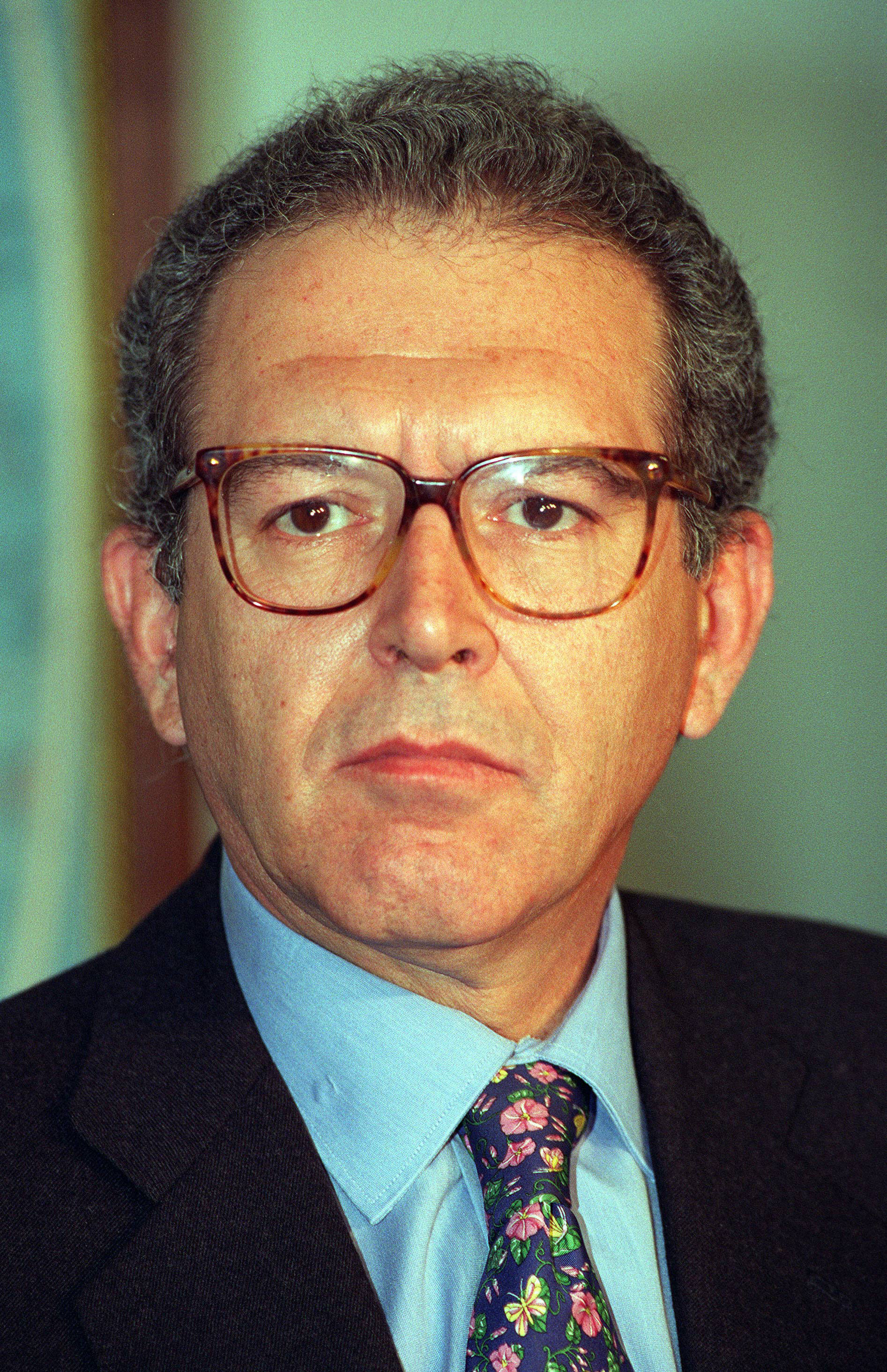

Minister of Defence
- In office 1996–2000
- Preceded by: Gustavo Suárez Pertierra
- Succeeded by: Federico Trillo-Figueroa

Personal details
- Born: 19 December 1946 (age 79) Madrid, Spain
- Party: Partido Popular

Eduardo Serra Rexach is a Spanish politician and businessman, who served as the Minister of Defence from 1996 to 2000 during the government of José María Aznar. He is the only person to have held public office with all three governing parties in democratic Spain, having served in senior roles in the UCD, the Spanish Socialist Workers' Party, and the Partido Popular.

== Biography ==
Born in Madrid on 19 December 1946, Serra attended primary and secondary school at Instituto Ramiro de Maeztu. He graduated with a degree in law from the Complutense University of Madrid in 1968. In 1974, he joined the State Lawyers Corps.

He has been a member of various non-profit organisations; in July 1987, he was appointed Director General of Fundación de Ayuda contra la Drogadicción (FAD – Foundation for Help Against Drug Addiction), and has been president of the institution since March 1996. He has also been President of the Royal Board of Trustees of the Museo del Prado (2000–2004), and president and founder of Elcano Royal Institute for International and Strategic Studies. He is also the chairman of Everis Foundation.

Serra is married to Luz del Camino Municio and has one son from a previous marriage.

== Political activities ==
Serra entered politics in 1977 as part of the cabinet of the then Minister of Industry and Energy, Alberto Oliart, while Adolfo Suárez and the Union of the Democratic Centre were in power. He soon rose to become the head of staff of the cabinet and served in this capacity until 1979. From 1979 to 1982, he served as the general secretary of National Institute of Industry.

In 1982, the new president Leopoldo Calvo Sotelo (also UCD) appointed Oliart as his Minister of Defence, who in turn chose Serra to be his undersecretary. Serra became the first civilian to hold this post.

Later in 1982, the Spanish Socialist Workers' Party won the elections. Spain's new prime minister, Felipe González, appointed Narcís Serra to the post of Minister of Defence, and Eduardo Serra as the first secretary of state for Defense. He assisted the government during Spain's accommodation into NATO, until his resignation in 1987.

In 1996 the Partido Popular came into power under José María Aznar. Aznar called Serra back into political service, this time as his Minister of Defence. He served in the post until 2000, when he was replaced by Federico Trillo-Figueroa.

Serra continues to hold positions in the private sector and various non-profit organisations, as detailed below.

== Professional activities ==
Serra has held positions in many companies in the private sector, including president of Telettra España (1998–2001) and Peugeot-Talbot España (1992–1996), founder and chairman Airtel Móvil (1994–1996), vice-president and president of Cubiertas MZOV (1989–1995), and chair of UBS Spain (2000–2006). He is president of Fundación everis since 2005 and in May 2010 he was appointed vice president of everis, a Spanish IT Consulting firm.

From 1993 to 1996, he was the president of Instituto de Cuestiones Internacionales y Política Exterior (INCIPE – Institute for International and Foreign Policy Issues). He is a reserve officer in the Infantería de Marina.
