= Mira Milosevich =

Serbian researcher and author (born 1966)

- Born: 1966 (age 59–60); Belgrade
- Occupation: Senior research fellow
- Notable work: Breve Historia de la Revolución Rusa (2017), El imperio Zombi. Rusia y el orden mundial (2024)

Mira Milosevich (Belgrade, 1966) is a researcher, analyst, and writer, currently a Senior Research Fellow at the Elcano Royal Institute.

Milosevich obtained a degree in sociology and political science from the University of Belgrade. In 1996, she settled in Madrid, where she completed her training, earning a PhD in European Studies from the Complutense University of Madrid. She has also undertaken further training at the Harvard Kennedy School and the CSIS.

As an analyst, she specialized in topics such as the rivalry between Russia, China, and the U.S., as well as the role of Russia in the international security ecosystem, taking into account its foreign policy and its ambitions in the post-Soviet space. In this regard, she has worked advising various national and international organisations, such as the Spanish Congress, the European Parliament and the UK Parliament, as well as NATO and the U.S. Department of State, particularly on issues related to Russia's use of disinformation as a strategy in the West. She speaks Serbo-Croatian, Spanish, English and Russian, and is a collaborator at IE University.

== Publications ==
- Los tristes y los heroes: historias de los nacionalistas serbios (The sad ones and the heroes: stories from Serbian nationalists) (Espasa-Calpe, 2000)
- El trigo de la Guerra. Nacionalismo y Violencia en Kosovo (The wheat of war. Nationalism and violence in Kosovo) (Espasa Calpe, 2001)
- Breve Historia de la Revolución Rusa (Brief history of the Russian Revolution) (Galaxia Gutenberg, 2017).
- El imperio Zombi. Rusia y el orden mundial (The zombie empire. Russia and the world order) (Galaxia Gutenberg, 2024)
