= Jerónimo Saavedra =

Spanish politician and academic (1936–2023)

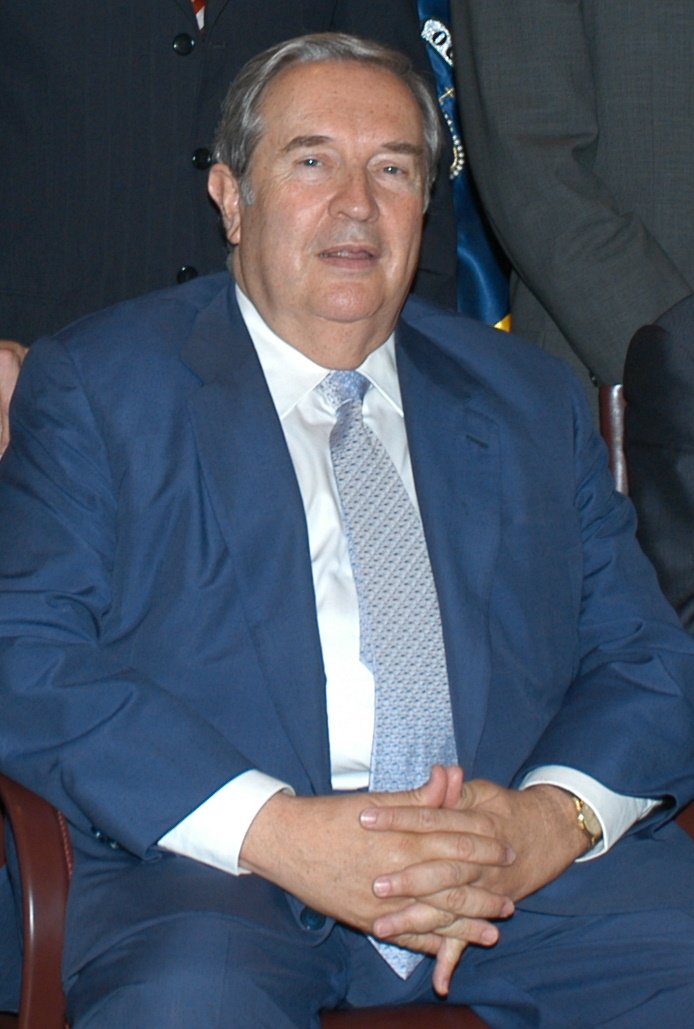
- Saavedra in 2004

President of the Canary Islands
- In office 25 July 1991 – 6 April 1993
- Preceded by: Lorenzo Olarte
- Succeeded by: Manuel Hermoso
- In office 13 January 1983 – 3 August 1987
- Preceded by: Francesco Ucelay (president of the Junta of Canarias)
- Succeeded by: Fernando Fernández

Minister of Education and Science of Spain
- In office 3 July 1995 – 5 May 1996
- Prime Minister: Felipe González
- Preceded by: Gustavo Suárez Pertierra
- Succeeded by: Esperanza Aguirre

Minister of Public Administrations of Spain
- In office 14 July 1993 – 3 July 1995
- Prime Minister: Felipe González
- Preceded by: Juan Manuel Eguiagaray
- Succeeded by: Joan Lerma

Personal details
- Born: 3 July 1936 Las Palmas, Spain
- Died: 21 November 2023 (aged 87) Las Palmas, Spain
- Party: PSOE (1972–2011)
- Education: Complutense University of Madrid

Jerónimo Saavedra Acevedo (3 July 1936 – 21 November 2023) was a Spanish politician and academic. He served as President of the Canary Islands twice, from 1983 to 1987, and again from 1991 to 1993.

He became the first president of the Canary Islands after the establishment of the autonomous communities system under the 1978 Constitution and was in charge of structuring the regional administration and overseeing the democratic transition in the islands. Saavedra also served as Minister of Public Administrations of Spain between 1993 and 1995 and as Minister of Education and Science of Spain between 1995 and 1996. He was a member of the Congress of Deputies in the constituent legislature until 1983, a senator twice and mayor of his hometown Las Palmas de Gran Canaria between 2007 and 2011.

Saavedra was a significant figure in Spanish LGBT history, being the first openly gay politician to hold several high public offices.

== Early life and education ==
Saavedra was born in Las Palmas de Gran Canaria on 3 July 1936 to a middle-class Canarian bourgeois family two weeks before the outbreak of the Spanish Civil War. He was the son of Martín Saavedra, a fishing businessman, and Isabel Acevedo. His paternal grandfather was Jerónimo Saavedra de la Cruz, the liberal lieutenant colonel from Málaga who became the military governor of the island of Gran Canaria in 1879, and who married Luisa Medina, a native of Agaete of the northern part of the island and a relative of the poet Tomás Morales Castellano.

In 1940 Saavedra began his studies at the Jesuit school of Las Palmas, a school known for not having a harsh Francoist education, and where he stayed until he was 16 years old, when he finished his baccalaureate. In October 1953 he began his law career at the University of La Laguna in Tenerife, moving in 1956 to Madrid, where he finished his studies in 1958 at the Complutense University of Madrid. He specialised in labour and trade union law and started working as an assistant professor.

After earning his doctorate in law, Saavedra moved in 1959 to Cologne to improve his German and to get in contact with the labour law expert and academic Hans Carl Nipperdey. After returning briefly to Madrid, Saavedra settled in Florence, Italy, to study the international trade union movement.

Between 1959 and 1962 he studied for a diploma in Business Administration at the Escuela de Organización Industrial in Madrid and at the International School of Comparative Labour Law in Trieste, Italy. Back in Madrid in 1967, he co-founded the Centro de Estudios de Problemas Contemporáneos (Centre for the Study of Contemporary Problems). In 1970 Saavedra became professor of labor law at the University of La Laguna.

In the summer of that year, Saavedra, together with other jurists and intellectuals, promoted the creation of the Instituto Universitario de la Empresa, an institutional platform to channel the debate on the new economic and fiscal regime of the Canary Islands that was then under discussion. This institute convened several sectoral meetings and concluded with 64 criteria that laid the foundations for the future Statute of Autonomy of the Canary Islands, which would only be possible with the advent of democracy.

== Early political career ==
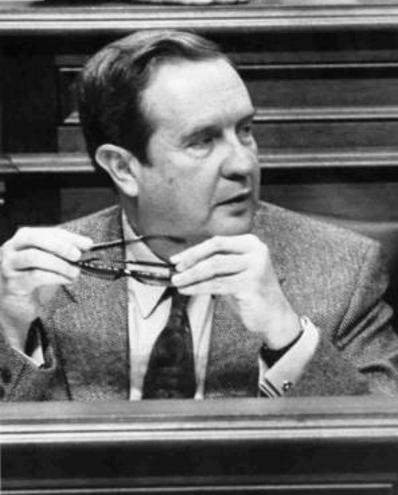
Saavedra in the Canarian Parliament

Saavedra joined the Spanish Socialist Workers' Party (PSOE) and the Unión General de Trabajadores (UGT) in summer 1972. He took part in the 24th Congress of the PSOE in 1972 in Toulouse and was secretary at the 25th Congress in 1974 in Suresnes, the latter being the one that broke with the party's clandestine tradition and allowed the party to expand in the Canary Islands.

In the first democratic elections of 1977, Saavedra was elected to the Constituent Courts representing Las Palmas and became a member of the Commission of Constitutional Affairs and Public Liberties that was in charge of drafting the Constitution of Spain. He was a member of the Congress of Deputies for first time until 1983.

Between 1977 and 1983, and between 1988 and 1997 he was the Secretary-General of the Socialist Party of the Canaries (PSC-PSOE).

== President of the Canary Islands (1983–1987, 1991–1993) ==
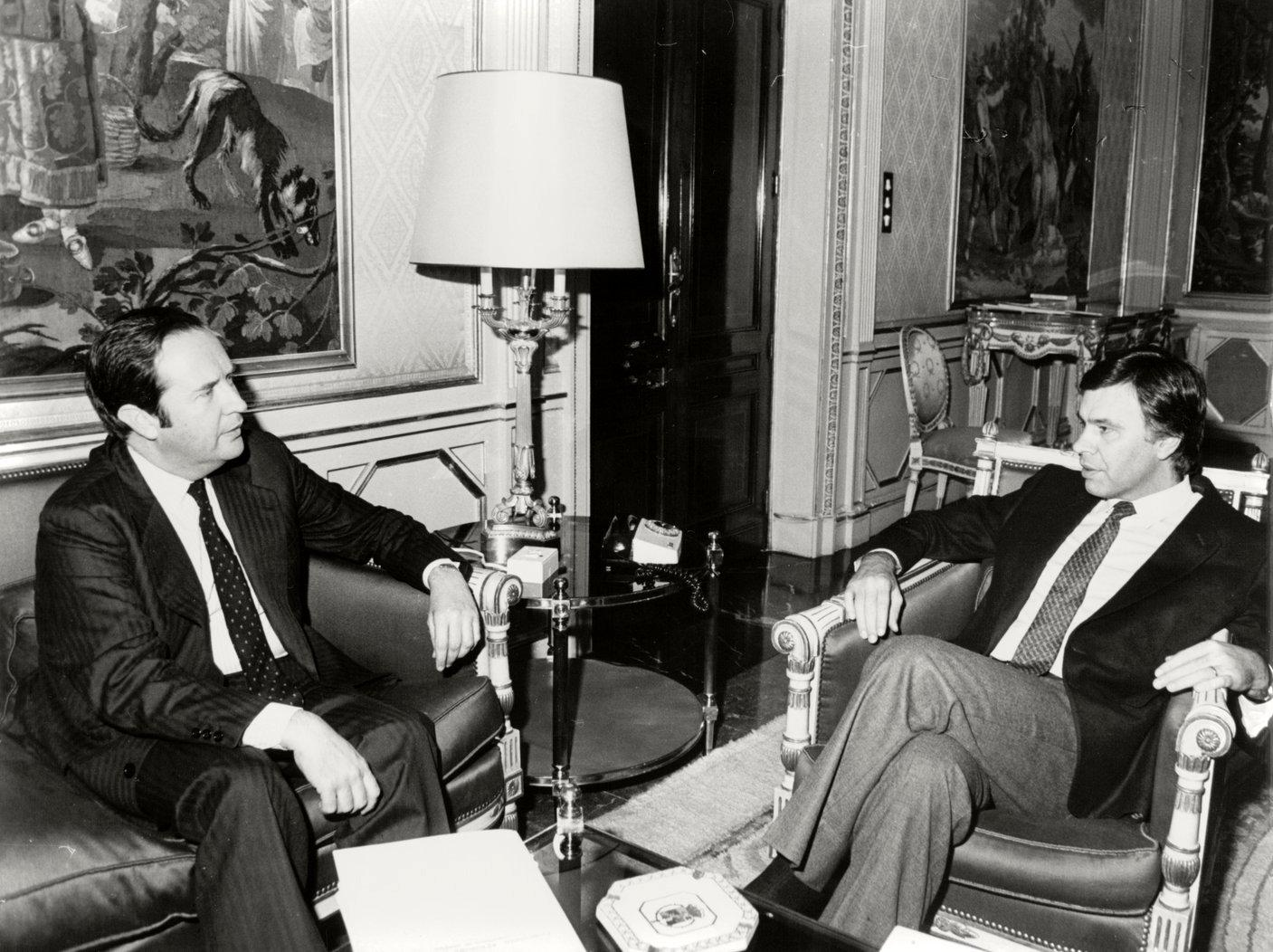
Saavedra (left) meeting Spanish Prime Minister Felipe González, 14 August 1983

During the Spanish transition to democracy the process of establishing the Canary Islands as an autonomous community began in April 1978. On 14 April, Saavedra became the first vice-president of the Junta of Canarias, the pre-autonomy executive and legislative body. This provisional organ was mainly responsible for drafting the new Statute of Autonomy, receiving the symbolic transfer of authority in Culture and Urban Planning, and urging transfers in Education "to make it understandable to the majority of citizens that autonomy was convenient and necessary".

=== First term: 1983–1987 ===
In August 1982, the Cortes Generales approved the new Statute of Autonomy of the Canary Islands and Saavadera was elected interim president of the first autonomous government.

In the first regional elections held on 8 May 1983, he was elected member of the Parliament of the Canary Islands for the constituency of Gran Canaria. He resigned as a deputy in the Congress of Deputies and was elected on 7 June of that year as president of the Canary Islands. The Saavedra government had to design the structures of a regional administration that had just been created. In the autumn of 1983 he promoted the Canary Islands Music Festival (Festival de Música de Canarias), which was created in 1984 and held its first performances in 1985.

On 21 June 1985 he resigned after a report in Parliament opposed to the Accession Treaty of Spain to the European Economic Community, referring to the Protocol II on the Canary Islands, which had been signed a few days earlier, was successful. Even so, the following 15 July, thanks to the "Progress Pact" signed by the PSC-PSOE, the Communist Party and the nationalist forces, he was again sworn in as president of the Canary Islands. Saavedra stood for re-election in 1987. Although his party won a plurality of seats, a centre-right agreement made Fernando Fernández Martín the new president on 30 July 1987.

=== Second term: 1991–1993 ===
In 1990, the PSC-PSOE selected him again as its candidate for the presidency of the islands in the 1991 elections. Saavedra won the elections again, and on 10 July 1991 he was sworn in as president for the fourth time. On 31 March 1993, a vote of censure led by Manuel Hermoso, who was Saavedra's Vice-president, together with the rest of the parties except the People's Party of the Canary Islands overthrew Saavedra's government. Three months later, the Canarian parliament appointed him senator.

== In the national government ==
With the victory of the PSOE the 1993 general elections, newly reelected Prime Minister of Spain Felipe González named Saavedra as the Minister of Public Administrations of Spain, an office to which he was sworn in on 14 July 1993. On 29 July he resigned as a senator and as member of the Canarian parliament. As minister he promoted the Modernisation Plan for the Administration and managed the transfer of power to the Autonomous Communities.

In the reshuffle of the González government of 1995, Saavedra was appointed Minister of Education and Science of Spain. He was sworn in on 4 July 1995 and held the office until 5 May 1997, when was succeeded by Esperanza Aguirre.

=== Later life ===
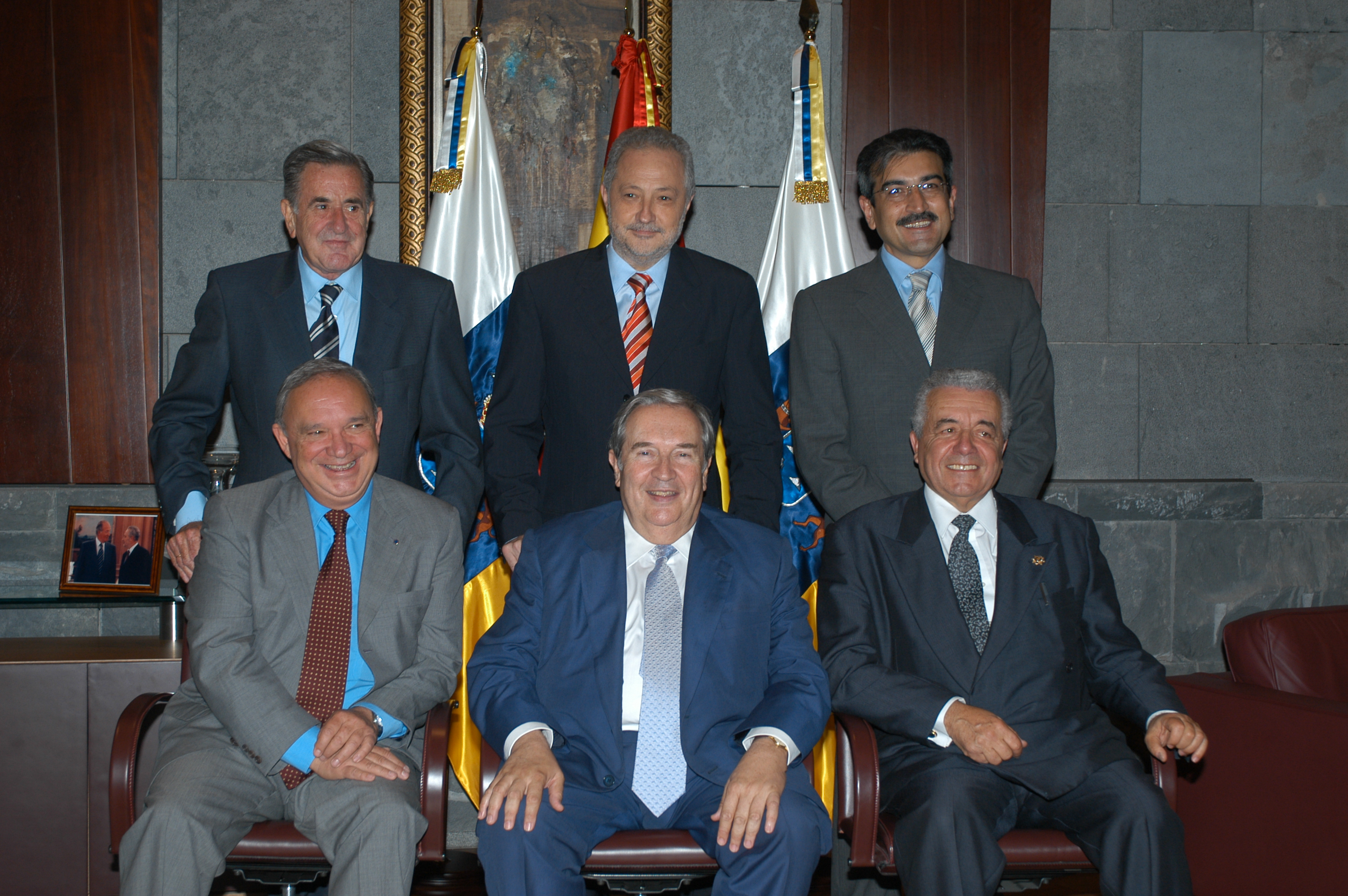
Saavedra (front row centre) with the other Canary Islands presidents, 28 May 2004

The Parliament of Canarias named him once again as senator, assuming the office on 20 July 1999 and until 22 July 2003. Saavedra ran again for the presidency of the Canary Islands in the 1999 elections, but was unsuccessful. Between 2004 and 2011, and since 2018 Saavedra was member of the Board of Trustees of the Teatro Real.

In 2007, he was elected mayor of Las Palmas de Gran Canaria in a landslide victory, bringing the twelve-year rule of the rival conservative People's Party to an end. He held office until his defeat in his unsuccessful reelection campaign in 2011.

Saavedra was designated as Ombudsman (Diputado del Común) of the Canary Islands between 2011 and 2018, which obliged him to leave the PSOE.

== Personal life and death ==
In December 2000, during the presentation of Fernando Bruquetas de Castro's book Outing en España. Los españoles salen del armario (Outing in Spain. Spaniards come out of the closet), Saavedra announced publicly that he was gay. As he explained in the book's foreword, his coming out was prompted by the death of his partner Sebastián in a traffic accident that year, when he asked Sebastián's family for his name to be included in the obituary.

After coming out, Saavedra joined Miquel Iceta as one of the first openly gay politicians in the history of Spain and he became the first to hold certain high public offices: member of the Cortes Generales, minister, mayor of a provincial capital, and president of an Autonomous Community.

He was also a Freemason, having been initiated into the Lisbon Lodge in 1989, being the first Freemason minister of the Spanish democracy.

His niece, Marta Saavedra, has been a PSOE senator for Gran Canaria since 2023.

Saavedra died on 21 November 2023 at the age of 87 in his home of Las Palmas de Gran Canaria. That same afternoon his body lay in state in the Casas Consistoriales of Las Palmas. The municipal government and the government of the Canary Islands decreed three days of official mourning. On the afternoon of 22 November, Saavedra was buried in the cemetery of the Vegueta neighbourhood, the Las Palmas district where he lived all his life.

== Honors and awards ==
- Grand Cross of the Order of Charles III (1996)
- Grand Cross of the Civil Order of Alfonso X, the Wise (1998)
- Golden Medal of the Canary Islands (2015)
- Premio Especial en ARN Cultura & Business Pride (2017)
- Founder's Gold Medal with red badge by the Grand Lodge of Spain (2022)

Political offices
Preceded by Francesco Ucelay	President of the Canary Islands; 1983–1987	Succeeded by Fernando Fernández Martín
Preceded by Lorenzo Olarte	President of the Canary Islands; 1991–1993	Succeeded by Manuel Hermoso
Preceded by Juan Manuel Eguiagaray	Minister of Public Administrations; 1993–1995	Succeeded by Joan Lerma
Preceded by Gustavo Suárez Pertierra	Minister of Education and Science; 1995–1996	Succeeded by Esperanza Aguirre
Preceded by Josefa Luzardo	Mayor of Las Palmas de Gran Canaria; 2007–2011	Succeeded by Juan José Cardona
Party political offices
New post	Secretary-General of the Socialist Party of the Canaries; 1977–1985	Succeeded by Alberto de Armas
Preceded by Alberto de Armas	Secretary-General of the Socialist Party of the Canaries; 1988–1997	Succeeded by Juan Carlos Alemán
