= Javier Gómez-Navarro =

Spanish politician (1945–2024)

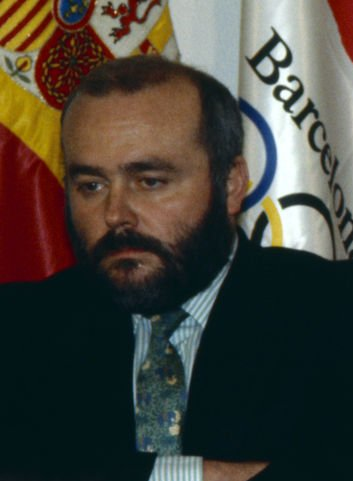
- Gómez-Navarro in 1990

Minister of Trade and Tourism
- In office 14 July 1993 – 6 May 1996
- Prime Minister: Felipe González
- Preceded by: Claudio Aranzadi
- Succeeded by: Josep Piqué

Personal details
- Born: Javier Gómez-Navarro Navarrete; 13 September 1945 Madrid, Spain
- Died: 29 August 2024 (aged 78) Madrid, Spain
- Party: Independent
- Education: Complutense University of Madrid

Javier Gómez-Navarro Navarrete (13 September 1945 – 29 August 2024) was a Spanish politician who served as Minister of Trade and Tourism from July 1993 to May 1996. Gómez-Navarro died on 29 August 2024, at the age of 78.
