= José Juan Ruiz =

- Born: José Juan Ruiz; 1957 (age 67–68); Tarancón (Cuenca, Spain)
- Occupation: economist
- Known for: Elcano Royal Institute President (2021-)

José Juan Ruiz (born 1957) is a Spanish economist and public servant. Since February 2021, he has served as the president of the Elcano Royal Institute, a Spanish think tank specializing in international and strategic studies.

== Biography ==
Born in Tarancón in 1957, José Juan Ruiz holds a degree in Economic Sciences from the Autonomous University of Madrid. He belongs to the State Commercial Technicians and Economists Corps. Ruiz's career has spanned three main areas: public administration, private banking, and international organizations.

Ruiz held various senior positions in the Spanish Ministry of Economy, Finance, and Commerce between 1983 and 1993. During this time, he managed Spain's relations with key institutions such as the International Monetary Fund (IMF), the World Bank, and Development Banks. In the European sphere, he was a member and later president (1992–1993) of the European Union's Economic Policy Committee and chaired the Spanish Delegation to the OECD for macroeconomic supervision. He currently serves on the Advisory Council for Economic Affairs for Spain's Minister of Economy, Trade, and Business.

In private banking, he served as Chief Economist for Argentaria (1993–1996). Subsequently, he was the Chief Economist and Strategy Director for Banco Santander's Latin America division, where he was also a member of executive and directorial committees in several Latin American countries.

From 2012 to 2018, José Juan Ruiz worked at the Inter-American Development Bank (IDB) in Washington D.C., where he was the Chief Economist and Director of the Research Department, focusing on development financing for Latin America. In February 2021, he was appointed president of the Elcano Royal Institute. Prior to this, he had been a member of the institution's Scientific Council since 2012.

José Juan Ruiz's economic analysis focuses on the profound reconfiguration of the global economic order, with a focus on the transition toward geoeconomic power dynamics.

Ruiz has combined his main career path with activities in academia and the consulting/influence sector. He has served as a professor in institutions such as the Master's program at the IE School of Government and Public Policy. He was a member and president of the Social Council of the University of Castilla-La Mancha (2003–2012). He has served on the boards of directors of public and private companies, including his role as a director of the Red Eléctrica Group. He is a frequent media commentator and has been a member of the editorial boards for publications such as Política Exterior, Prisa, and Grupo Recoletos.
