= Juan Manuel Eguiagaray =

Spanish economist, academic, businessman and politician (1945–2025)

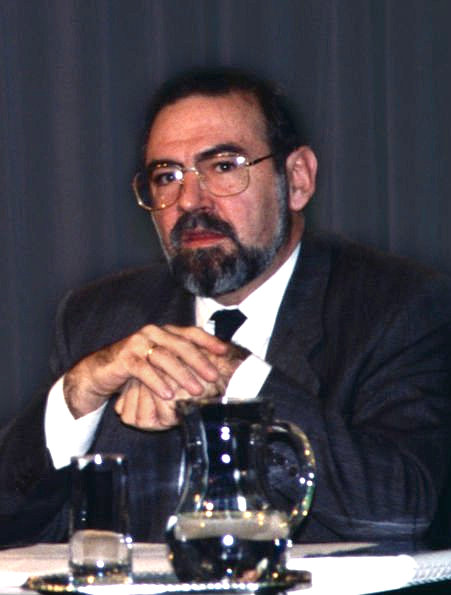
- Manuel Eguiagaray in 1991

Minister of Industry and Energy
- In office 1993–1996
- Prime Minister: Felipe González Márquez
- Preceded by: Claudio Aranzadi
- Succeeded by: Josep Piqué

Minister for Public Administration
- In office 1991–1993
- Prime Minister: Felipe González Márquez
- Preceded by: Joaquín Almunia

Personal details
- Born: 25 December 1945 Bilbao, Spain
- Died: 29 May 2025 (aged 79)
- Party: PSOE
- Education: University of Deusto

Juan Manuel Eguiagaray Ucelay (25 December 1945 – 29 May 2025) was a Spanish economist, academic, businessman and politician. He served as the Minister of Industry and Energy from 1993 to 1996.

== Early life and education ==
Eguiagaray was born into a family of Basque origin in Bilbao on 25 December 1945. He received degrees in economics and law from the University of Deusto in Bilbao and held a PhD degree in economics.

== Career ==
From 1970 to 1982 Eguiagaray taught economics at the University of Deusto. In the 1970s he entered politics and became a member of the PSOE. He was also named a member of the PSOE's executive committee. He was elected to the Spanish Parliament, representing Murcia province. He was one of the negotiators for Spanish government in the talks with ETA in Algiers in 1989 as he was one of Minister of the Interior José Luis Corcuera's right-hand man.

He was named the Minister for Public Administration in 1991 in the cabinet of Prime Minister Felipe González replacing Joaquín Almunia in the post. He served in the post until 1993 when he was appointed Minister for Industry and Energy in a cabinet reshuffle and replaced Claudio Aranzadi in the post. Eguiagaray was in office until 1996 and retired from politics in 2001.

After leaving politics, Eguiagaray returned to teaching. He taught macroeconomics and applied economics, and was an associate professor at Carlos III University in Madrid until 30 September 2006. He also served as the director of the European Aeronautic Defence and Space Company until February 2013. He was the director of studies at the Fundación Alternativas, a Madrid-based think tank.

== Death ==
Eguiagaray died on 29 May 2025, at the age of 79.
