= Federico Trillo =

Spanish politician (born 1952)

Federico Trillo Figueroa
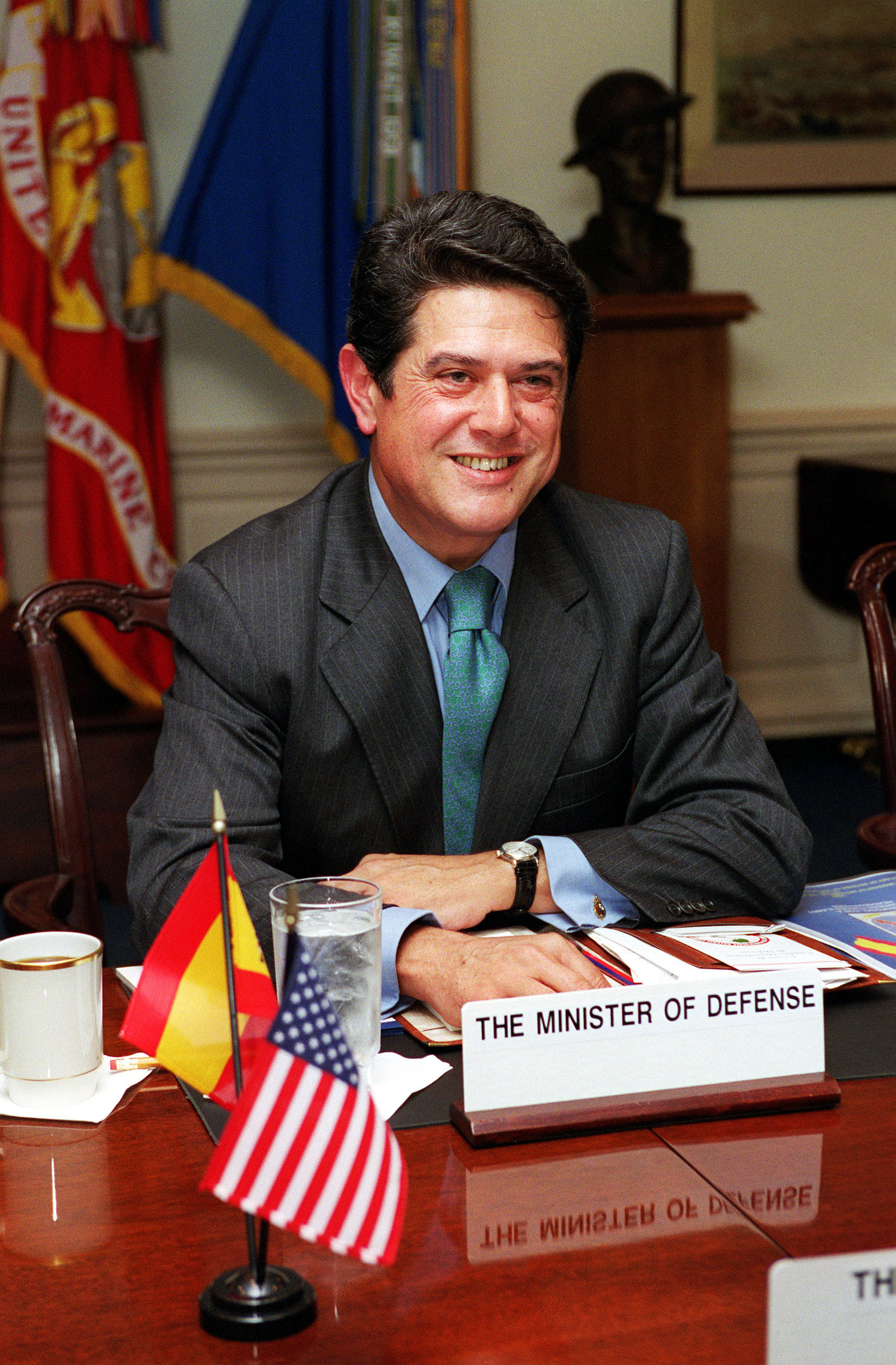

Minister of Defence
- In office 20 April 2000 – 20 April 2004
- Preceded by: Eduardo Serra
- Succeeded by: José Bono

President of the Congress of Deputies
- In office 27 March 1996 – 5 April 2000
- Preceded by: Felix Pons
- Succeeded by: Luisa Fernanda Rudi

Ambassador of Spain to the United Kingdom
- In office 30 March 2012 – 12 January 2017
- Preceded by: Carles Casajuana
- Succeeded by: Carlos Bastarreche

Member of the Congress of Deputies
- In office 14 November 1989 – 14 May 2012
- Constituency: Alicante

Personal details
- Born: 23 May 1952 (age 73) Cartagena, Murcia
- Party: Partido Popular
- Profession: Lawyer, politician

Military service
- Branch/service: Navy
- Years of service: 1974-1989
- Rank: Judge-Advocate Mayor
- Unit: Naval Legal Corps

Federico Trillo-Figueroa Martínez-Conde (Spanish pronunciation: [feðeˈɾiko ˈtɾiʝo fiɣeˈɾoa maɾˈtineθ ˈkonde]; born 23 May 1952) is a former Spanish Politician of the People's Party, who has served as President of the Congress of Deputies, Minister of Defense and Ambassador of Spain to the United Kingdom.

The son of a governor in Francoist Spain, Trillo graduated with a bachelor's degree in law from the University of Salamanca and a PhD from the Complutense University of Madrid.

Trillo entered into the Navy's Legal Corps as first of his class in 1974 where he was posted in the naval prosecutor's office of the Maritime Zone of the Mediterranean, later he was posted in the Directorship of Military Naval Construction. In 1979, he passed the competitive examination for Counsel of the Council of State. He retired from the navy as a Judge-Advocate Mayor in 1989 in order to enter politics.

In 1983 he entered the legal staff of the Alianza Popular (People's Alliance), then headed by Manuel Fraga Iribarne, where he actively participated in the restructuring of the party, refashioning it as the People's Party. He has been a member of the national executive since 1986.

Trillo has been elected deputy for the province of Alicante since 1989. From 1989 and 1996, he was vice-president of the Congress of Deputies. On 27 March 1996 he was elected president of the Congress of Deputies, a position he maintained until the end of the sixth legislature in 2000. On 27 April 2000 Prime Minister José María Aznar named him Minister of Defense for Aznar's second government.

In July 2002, he ordered an attack on Perejil Island, which had been occupied for days by Moroccan soldiers. The Yakovlev 42 crash in Turkey on 26 May 2003, in which 62 Spanish soldiers died while returning from Afghanistan marked the end of his tenure as the Minister of Defense. Three of his subordinates were sent to prison for falsifying the identification of 30 of the bodies. A judge found no grounds to implicate Trillo, and Trillo repeatedly refused to accept political or criminal responsibility.

Trillo is the author of many books on law and judicial and political thought. His most recognized works are: El poder político en los dramas de Shakespeare (Political Power in Shakespeare's Dramas) and Pregones y Semblanzas.

He collaborated in the founding of the Association for Studies for Social Progress. He is a member of the Spanish Commission of Military History, and a member of Opus Dei.

== Personal life ==
Federico Trillo-Figueroa Martínez-Conde was born on 23 May 1952 in Cartagena, Murcia. He is the son of Federico Trillo-Figueroa Vázquez and Eloísa Martínez-Conde Muñoz. Federico, a Galician, was a major figure in the Francoist regime. Originally a military lawyer, he later become a member of the Cortes Españolas before becoming the mayor of Cartagena in the 1960s and then also assumed the post of civil governor in 1974. He died in 2002, aged 82. Eloísa died 15 years later at the age of 90.

Federico Trillo married María José Molinuevo, a lawyer in the Court of Auditors, in 1976. She is the daughter of a judge and was born in Orihuela, Alicante. They have five children: María José, Federico, Marta, Mercedes and Santiago, nicknamed "Yago". He is a practicing Catholic and a member of Opus Dei.

== Education and early career ==
Trillo studied law at the University of Salamanca, and after graduating completed his doctorate in the same subject at the Complutense University of Madrid

In 1974, he joined the prosecution corps of the Spanish Navy after graduating first in his class. Five years later, he joined the Counsel of the Council of State after getting the highest result in the competitive examination again, officially joining on 21 June 1980. During his time there, he worked at the Economy and Finance, Interior Territory, and Foreign Affairs sections, contributing to the drafting of an opinion on Spain's entrance into the North Atlantic Treaty Organization (NATO) while serving in the latter.

Political offices
Preceded by Félix Pons Irazazábal	President of the Congress of Deputies; 1996 – 2000	Succeeded by Luisa Fernanda Rudi Ubeda
Preceded by Eduardo Serra Rexach	Minister of Defence; 2000 – 2004	Succeeded by José Bono
