= Antoni Asunción =

Spanish politician (1951–2016)

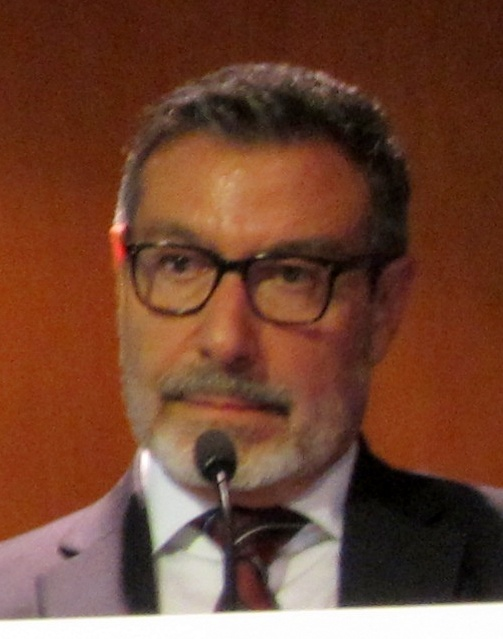

Minister of Interior
- In office November 1993 – May 1994
- Prime Minister: Felipe González
- Preceded by: José Luis Corcuera
- Succeeded by: Juan Alberto Belloch

Member of the Congress of Deputies
- In office 25 June 1993 – 9 January 1996
- Constituency: Valencia

Member of the Corts Valencianes
- In office 13 June 1999 – 20 September 1999

Personal details
- Born: Antoni Asunción Hernández; 12 July 1951 Manises, Spain
- Died: 5 March 2016 (aged 64) Valencia, Spain
- Party: Spanish Socialist Workers' Party (PSOE)

Antoni Asunción Hernández (12 July 1951 – 5 March 2016) was a Spanish politician of the Spanish Socialist Workers' Party (PSOE). He was Minister of Interior between 1993 and 1994. He also served as member of the Congress of Deputies during the V Legislature (1993–1996).

== Career ==
Asunción was born on 12 July 1951 in Manises. He started his political career as alcalde (mayor) of his hometown in the 1970s. He was elected in the 1979 and 1983 municipal elections. He subsequently became Deputation President of Valencia. In 1988 he was named Director General of the Penitentiary Institutions under Justice Minister Enrique Múgica Herzog. During his period as director he was one of the main designers of the dispersion policy of ETA prisoners. To establish the policy which tried to break ETA prisoner discipline he also worked with the leader of the Basque Nationalist Party, Xabier Arzalluz.

In the 1993 general elections Asunción obtained a seat in the Congress of Deputies for the Electoral District of Valencia, he would serve until 1996. In 1994 he became Minister of Interior in the government of PSOE Prime Minister Felipe González. During this time Luis Roldán, former Director of the Guardia Civil, was accused of corruption. Asunción promised that Roldán would be persecuted, and that he would not be able to leave country. When Roldán fled the country Asunción, having been in office for five months, offered his resignation to González, who refused. Asunción then stated that he would just stop coming into work and González subsequently accepted.

In the 1999 provincial elections Asunción was elected to the Corts Valencianes. He tried to become President of the Valencian Government but lost out to Eduardo Zaplana of the People's Party. Several months later he left the Corts, having served between 13 June and 20 September.

Asunción then left politics and focused on his business venture for several years. In 2010 he unsuccessfully tried to become Secretary-General of the PSOE of Valencia. The PSOE suspended his membership in 2011, stating that Asunción made numerous allegations of electoral fraud without evidence. In 2013 Asunción supported the Movimiento Ciudadano of Albert Rivera.

== Personal life ==
In June 2015 Asunción was indicted by judge Santiago Pedraz of the Audiencia Nacional, he was charged with fraudulent bookkeeping and criminal conversion in a case concerning the sale of his share in the company Acuigroup Maremar to the Banco de Valencia. Asunción had founded and owned the company together with Társilo Piles, President of the Fundación Valencia CF, since 1999. In a response before the Audiencia Asunción he blamed the intermediaries of the bank for destroying the company. In December 2014 he had been cleared of the same charges by the Audiencia of Valencia.

He died on 5 March 2016 in Valencia, aged 64, after having suffered from an illness for several weeks. Asunción was a cousin of actor José Sancho.
