= Matilde Fernández =

Spanish politician (born 1950)

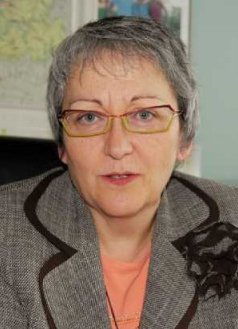

Minister of Social Affairs
- In office 1988–1993
- Prime Minister: Felipe González
- Succeeded by: Cristina Alberdi

Personal details
- Born: Matilde Fernández Sanz; 24 January 1950 (age 76) Madrid, Spain
- Party: Spanish Socialist Workers' Party
- Education: Complutense University of Madrid

Matilde Fernández (born 24 January 1950) is a Spanish social feminist and politician who served as minister of social affairs of Spain from 1988 to 1993.

== Early life and education ==
Fernández was born on 24 January 1950 in Madrid. She graduated from the Complutense University of Madrid, receiving a degree in psychology.

== Career ==
Following her graduation Fernández worked as an industrial psychologist in different companies. Later she became a member and the leader of the labor union movement. She began to serve as the general secretary of the Federation of Chemical Industries of the Unión General de Trabajadores in 1977. Between 1982 and 1988 she was the general secretary of the Chemical and Energy Industries. She joined the Spanish Socialist Workers' Party (PSOE) being part of the reformist group within it. In 1984, she became a member of the PSOE's federal executive committee and was appointed head of the secretariat for women’s participation.

Fernández was appointed minister of social affairs to the cabinet led by Prime Minister Felipe Gonzales in 1988. Fernández became the first minister of social affairs since the ministry was established by her appointment. She was backed by the PSOE group led by Alfonso Guerra. She was replaced by Cristina Alberdi in the post in 1993. In the Spanish Congress, she represented Cantabria from 1989 to 2000. From 1999 to 2003 Fernández was a councilor for the Madrid City Council.

In 2000, Fernández ran for the PSOE presidency, but lost election to José Luis Zapatero. Her candidacy was backed by the faction called guerristas. She was a regional deputy at the Assembly of Madrid from 2003 to May 2015.

Fernández became a board member of the United Nations High Commissioner for Refugees (UNHCR) in Spain in 2007. She was elected as a senator in 2008 and served in the IXth Legislature until 2011. As of 2018 Fernández was serving as the president of the UNHCR in Spain. Then she was made one of its honorary members.
