= Elcano Royal Institute =

Spanish think tank

- Real Instituto Elcano
- Abbreviation: RIE
- Formation: 2001; 25 years ago
- Type: Think tank
- Legal status: Foundation
- Headquarters: Madrid
- Website: http://www.realinstitutoelcano.org

The Elcano Royal Institute for International and Strategic Studies (Spanish: Real Instituto Elcano de Estudios Internacionales y Estratégicos; RIE) is a think tank based in Madrid, Spain.

It was created on 26 November 2001 as private foundation, formed by the Ministries of Foreign Affairs, Economy, Defence and Education, Culture and Sport as well as the public railway company RENFE, also receiving the additional funding from PRISA, CASA, CEPSA, SEAT, Indra Sistemas, the SGAE; Telefónica and Zeltia. It was set up with the aim of "promoting in society the knowledge of the international reality and of the foreign relations of Spain in all its aspects."

== Organization ==
Honorary President

- Felipe VI (King of Spain, formerly Prince of Asturias)

Chairman of the Board of Trustees

- Eduardo Serra Rexach (2001–2005)
- Gustavo Suárez Pertierra (2006–2011)
- Emilio Lamo de Espinosa (2012-2020)
- José Juan Ruiz (2021-)

Director

- Emilio Lamo de Espinosa (2001–2005)
- Gil Carlos Rodríguez Iglesias (2005–2012)
- Charles Powell (since 2012)
