= Gustavo Suárez Pertierra =

Spanish jurist and politician

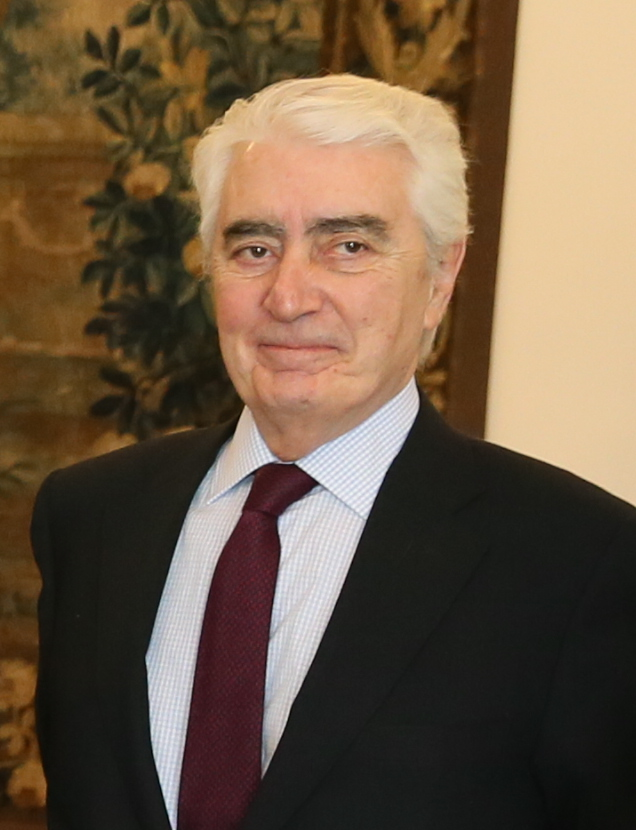

Minister of Defence
- In office 1995–1996

Minister of Education and Science
- In office 1993–1995

Member of the Congress of Deputies
- In office 1996–2000
- Constituency: Asturias

Personal details
- Born: 27 February 1949 (age 77) Cudillero, Spain
- Party: Spanish Socialist Workers' Party

Gustavo Suárez Pertierra (born 1949) is a Spanish jurist and politician. He served as Minister of Education and as Minister of Defence during the governments of Felipe González.

== Biography ==
Born on 27 February 1949 in Cudillero, he earned a PhD in Law at the University of Valladolid. He lectured in canon law at the University of Oviedo and the University of Valladolid, later holding the Chair of Canon Law at the Complutense University of Madrid (UCM). He briefly served as President of the University Socialist Grouping (ASU) in the 1980s.

He served as Undersecretary of Defence from 1984 to 1990 and as Secretary of State of Military Administration from 1990 to 1993. He was appointed Minister of Education and Science in 1993. In 1995, after a cabinet reshuffle, he changed portfolio and assumed the post of Minister of Defence on 3 July, in replacement of Julián García Vargas.

He ran as candidate to deputy 2nd in the PSOE list in Asturias for the 1996 general election and became a member of the 6th term of the Congress of Deputies (1996–2000).

He presided over the Elcano Royal Institute from 2005 to 2012.

In 2018, Suárez Pertierra was appointed President of the UNICEF's Spanish committee in replacement of Carmelo Angulo Barturen.

Political offices
Preceded by	Undersecretary of State of Defence; 1984–1990	Succeeded by
Preceded by	Secretary of State of Military Administration; 1990–1993	Succeeded by
Preceded by Alfredo Pérez Rubalcaba	Minister of Education and Science; 1993–1995	Succeeded by Jerónimo Saavedra
Preceded by Julián García Vargas	Minister of Defence; 1995–1996	Succeeded by Eduardo Serra Rexach
Non-profit organization positions
Preceded by Eduardo Serra Rexach	Chairman of the Board of Trustees of the Elcano Royal Institute; 2005–2012	Succeeded by Emilio Lamo de Espinosa Michels de Champourcin
