= Julián García Valverde =

Spanish politician (born 1946)

Minister of Health and Consumer Affairs
- In office 13 March 1991 – 13 January 1992
- Prime Minister: Felipe González
- Preceded by: Julián García Vargas
- Succeeded by: José Antonio Griñán

Personal details
- Born: Julián García Valverde; 1946 (age 79–80) Madrid, Spain
- Party: Spanish Socialist Workers' Party
- Education: Complutense University of Madrid

Julián García Valverde (born 1946) is a Spanish politician who served as minister of health and consumer affairs from March 1991 to January 1992. Before it he served as the chairman of the Spanish Rail network, Renfe. He had to resign from his ministerial post due to the allegations about his illegal involvement in land speculations during his term at the Renfe.
