= Julián García Vargas =

Spanish politician (1945–2026)

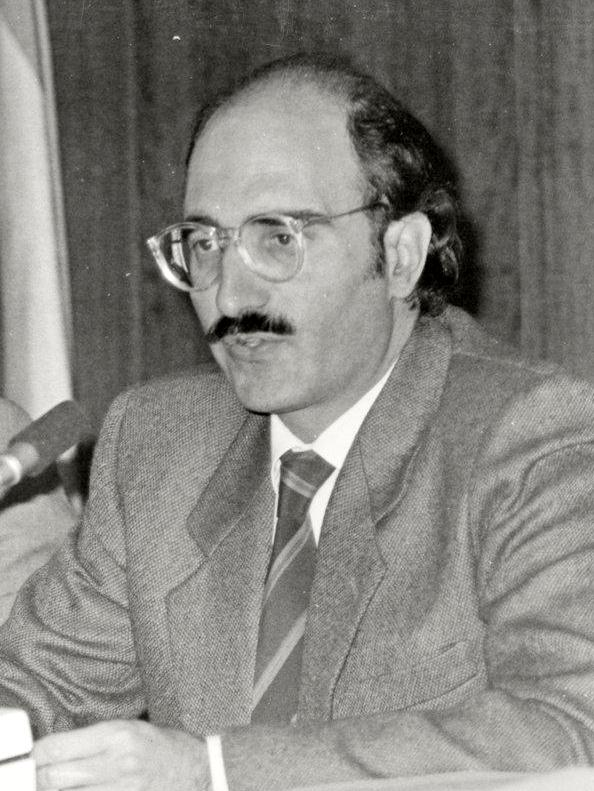
- García Vargas in 1986

Minister of Defence
- In office 13 March 1991 – 28 June 1995
- Prime Minister: Felipe González
- Preceded by: Narcís Serra
- Succeeded by: Gustavo Suárez Pertierra

Minister of Health and Consumer Affairs
- In office 26 July 1986 – 13 March 1991
- Prime Minister: Felipe González
- Preceded by: Ernest Lluch
- Succeeded by: Julián García Valverde

Personal details
- Born: 19 October 1945 Madrid, Spain
- Died: 29 September 2026 (aged 80) Madrid, Spain
- Party: Socialist Workers' Party
- Education: Universidad Complutense de Madrid

Julián García Vargas (Note: In this Spanish name, the first or paternal surname is García and the second or maternal family name is Vargas.) (19 October 1945 – 29 September 2026) was a Spanish economist and socialist politician who served, at different times, as minister of health and minister of defence.

== Early life and education ==
García was born in Madrid on 19 October 1945. He received a degree in economic sciences from the Universidad Complutense de Madrid in 1968.

== Career and activities ==
García was an economist and healthcare expert by profession. He was a member of the Socialist Workers' Party (PSOE). He began his career in private sector and then joined public sector, in which he worked until 1986.

He was appointed health minister on 26 July 1986 in the cabinet led by the Prime Minister Felipe González and was in office until March 1991. As of 2012, he was considered to be one of the three Spanish health ministers who significantly improved the country's health-care system. He was appointed defence minister on 12 March 1991 in a cabinet reshuffle. He retained his post in the July 1993 reshuffle. However, García resigned from office on 2 July 1995 due to press reports revealing that the military secret services (CESED) had been spying on individuals and public figures. Gustavo Suárez Pertierra succeeded García as defence minister in a cabinet reshuffle.

After leaving office García served as the special envoy of the European Union in Mostar, Bosnia, from November 1995 to April 1996 for the implementation of the Dayton Peace Agreement. He was the president of the Association of Defence Technology, Aeronautics and Space Companies (TEDAE) until his resignation in June 2013. As of 2005, he was the president of the Spanish Atlantic Association.

García was a board member of several companies. As of 2021, he was the president of a foundation entitled FEINDEF, the International Defence and Security Fair (Spanish: Feria Internacional de Defensa y Seguridad), which organizes yearly meetings in Madrid with the representatives of major international arms companies, high-ranking military commanders and political figures.

== Death ==
García died on 29 September 2026, at the age of 80.
