= Luis María Atienza =

Spanish politician and businessman

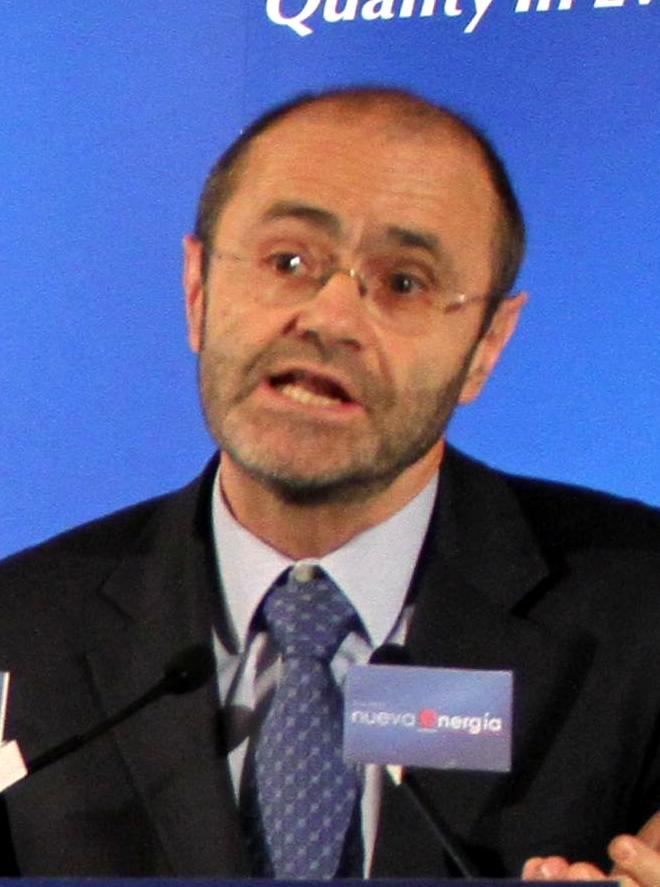

Minister of Agriculture, Fisheries and Food
- In office 6 May 1994 – 6 May 1996
- Prime Minister: Felipe González
- Preceded by: Vicente Albero
- Succeeded by: Loyola de Palacio

Personal details
- Born: Luis María Atienza Serna; 30 August 1957 (age 69) Trespaderne, Burgos, Spain
- Party: Spanish Socialist Workers' Party
- Education: University of Deusto

Luis María Atienza Serna (born 30 August 1957) is a Spanish politician and businessman. He served as Minister of Agriculture, Fisheries and Food from May 1994 to May 1996. During his time as Agriculture Minister, the National Parks Autonomous Agency (OAPN) was created.

He also served as Regional Minister for Economy and Planification of the Basque Government from 1989 to 1991.
