= Cristina Alberdi =

Spanish politician and lawyer (1946–2024)

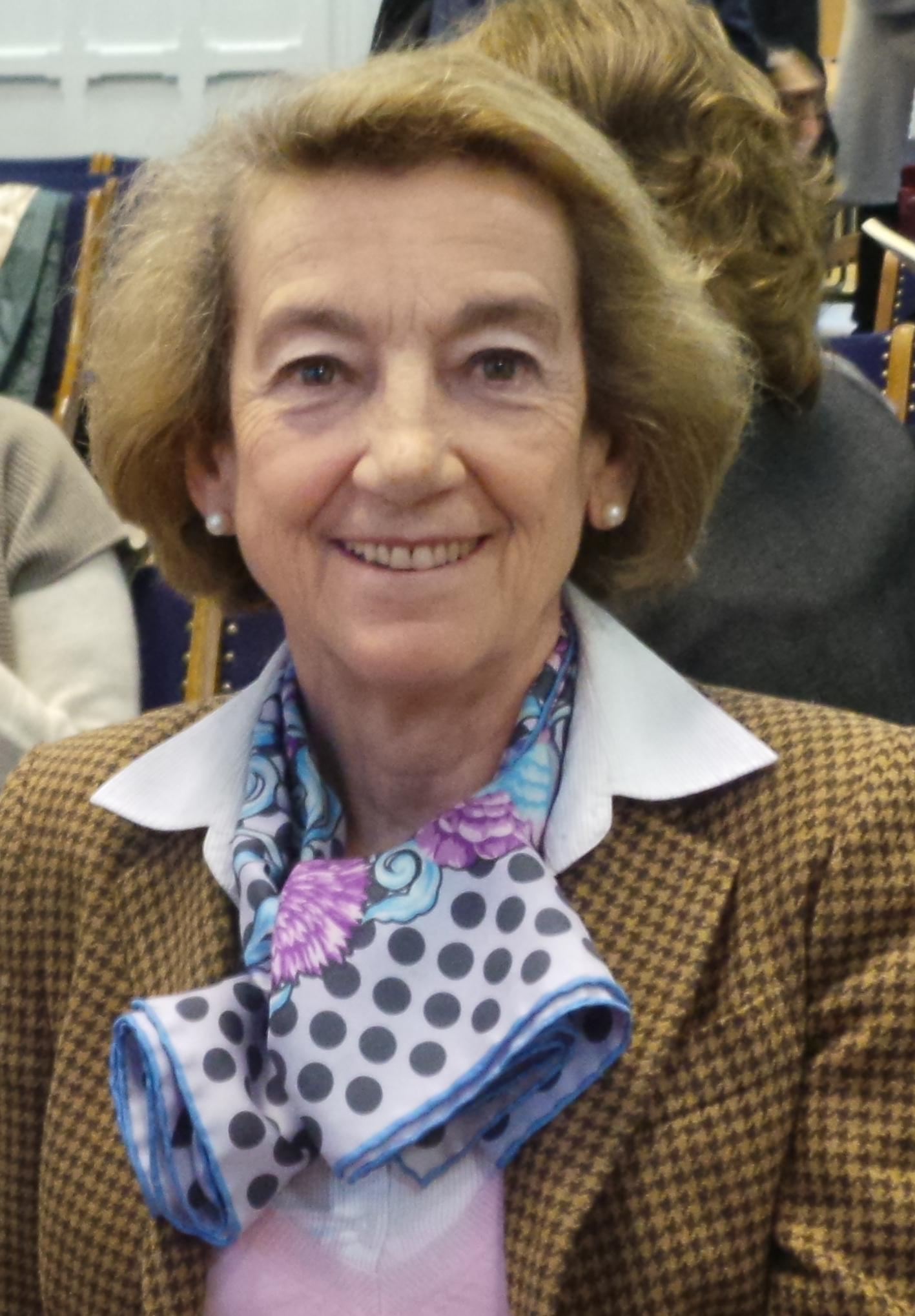

Minister of Social Affairs
- In office 1993–1996
- President: Felipe González
- Preceded by: Matilde Fernández
- Succeeded by: Pilar del Castillo

Member of the Congress of Deputies
- Constituency: Málaga (1996–2000); Madrid (2000–2003)

Personal details
- Born: 22 February 1946 Los Rosales, Seville, Spain
- Died: 27 June 2024 (aged 78) Madrid, Spain
- Party: Spanish Socialist Workers' Party (until 2003)
- Occupation: Politician, Lawyer

Cristina Alberdi (22 February 1946 – 27 June 2024) was a Spanish politician and lawyer. She served as minister of social affairs from 1993 to 1996.

== Education and career ==
Alberdi was born in Los Rosales, a small town of the province of Seville, on 22 February 1946.

Graduating in law, from 1970 she was a lawyer of the Colegio de Abogados (Bar Association), and in 1975 organized a feminist legal group. During the Spanish transition to democracy, Alberdi was an advisor to the preparatory work for the 1978 Constitution and the subsequent reforms of the Civil Code and the Criminal Code. She was later a member of the General Council of the Judiciary from 1985 to 1990, being the first woman to reach this office. She was appointed minister of social affairs in the cabinet led by Prime Minister Felipe Gonzales in 1993, replacing Matilde Fernández in the post. Alberdi was in office until 1996.

She was elected to the Congress of Deputies as Spanish Socialist Workers' Party (PSOE) member in 1996, representing Malaga district before moving to Madrid district which she represented from 2000 to 2003. She was also president of Spanish Socialist Workers' Party of the Community of Madrid (1997–2000). In 2003, she left PSOE. She was also president of the advisory council against violence in the Community of Madrid.

Alberdi died in Madrid on 27 June 2024, at the age of 78.

== See also ==
- Inés Alberdi – sister
