= Claudio Aranzadi =

Spanish engineer, businessman and politician

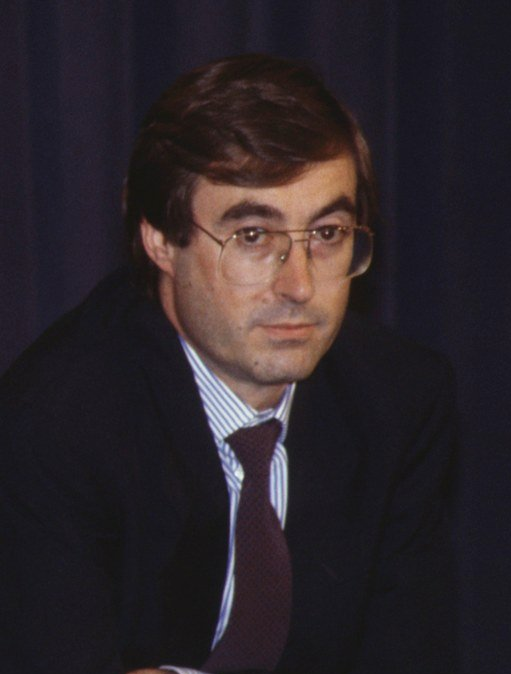
- Aranzadi in La Moncloa (June 1989)

Minister of Industry and Energy
- In office 1988–1993
- Prime Minister: Felipe González Márquez
- Succeeded by: Juan Manuel Eguiagaray

Personal details
- Born: José Claudio Aranzadi Martínez; 9 October 1946 (age 79) Bilbao
- Party: Spanish Socialist Workers' Party
- Education: Bilbao Industrial Engineering School; University of Paris I

José Claudio Aranzadi Martínez (born 9 October 1946) is a Spanish engineer, businessman and politician. He served as industry minister from 1988 to 1993.

== Early life and education ==
Aranzadi was born in Bilbao on 9 October 1946. He holds a bachelor's degree in industrial engineering from Bilbao Industrial Engineering School. Then he received an economics degree from the University of Paris I.

== Career ==
Aranzadi began his career at the ministry of industry. Then he moved to Banco Bilbao Vizcaya Argentaria where he served as a researcher. Next he was named deputy economic advisor in the Bancaya Group. In 1984, he was made deputy chairman of Instituto Nacional de Industria (INI), a vast state holding company of Spain. He became the chairman of INI on 1 August 1986, replacing Luis Carlos Croissier Batista in the post. Aranzadi supported privatization during his term at the INI, arguing that it was a powerful means of organizing asset portfolios and investment strategies. His tenure at the INI lasted until 12 July 1988 when he was succeeded by Jorge Mercader Miró as INI chairman.

Aranzadi served as the minister of industry and energy from 1988 to 1991 in the cabinet led by Prime Minister Felipe Gonzalez. Aranzadi was a member of the Spanish Socialist Workers' Party, being one of its right-wing leaders. He was appointed minister of industry, trade and tourism to the Gonzalez cabinet in 1991. In 1993, Juan Manuel Eguiagaray replaced Aranzadi as minister. After leaving office, Aranzadi was appointed permanent representative of Spain to the OECD in 1993. He succeeded Eloy Ibanez in the post.

He has been the chairman of BravoSolution España and advisor for Banco Bilbao Vizcaya Argentaria. He is a partner of Enerma Consultores, a member of the advisory board of CDTI (Centro para el Desarrollo Tecnólogico Industrial) and of the advisory board for the Spanish Energy Outlook 2030. In addition, he is also on the advisory board of various firms.

== Personal life ==
One of Aranzadi's relatives is Rafael Moreno Aranzadi, a football player known as Pichichi. He is married and has one child, a daughter.
