= Narcís Serra =

Spanish politician (born 1943)

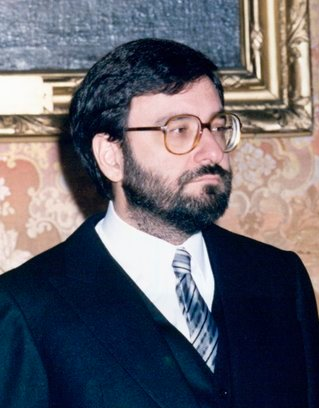

Deputy Prime Minister of Spain
- In office 13 March 1991 – 3 July 1995
- Prime Minister: Felipe González
- Preceded by: Alfonso Guerra
- Succeeded by: Francisco Álvarez Cascos

Minister of Defence
- In office 3 December 1982 – 13 March 1991
- Prime Minister: Felipe González
- Preceded by: Alberto Oliart Saussol
- Succeeded by: Julián García Vargas

113th Mayor of Barcelona
- In office 19 April 1979 – 2 December 1982
- Preceded by: Manuel Font i Altaba
- Succeeded by: Pasqual Maragall

Regional Minister of Town and Country Town and Public Works
- In office 5 December 1977 – 22 March 1979
- Prime Minister: Felipe González
- Preceded by: Office created
- Succeeded by: Lluís Armet i Coma

Member of the Congress of Deputies
- In office 22 June 1986 – 15 January 2004
- President: Josep Tarradellas
- Constituency: Barcelona

Personal details
- Born: 30 May 1943 (age 83) Barcelona, Catalonia
- Party: PSC (PSOE)
- Education: Autonomous University of Barcelona (PhD); London School of Economics (Research Fellow)

Narcís Serra i Serra (Catalan pronunciation: [nəɾˈsis ˈsɛrə]; born 30 May 1943) is a Spanish economist and politician, serving as Deputy Prime Minister of Spain from 1991 to 1995. Born in Barcelona in 1943, he was one of the leading figures of Catalan socialism during the Spanish transition to democracy, and he was one of the founders of the Socialists' Party of Catalonia, the Catalan branch of the Spanish Socialist Workers' Party (PSOE).

== Early life and career ==
Narcís Serra hailed from a Catholic family of Catalan origin. Prior to his political involvement, and before obtaining his PhD in economics at the Autonomous University of Barcelona, he worked as a research fellow at the London School of Economics from 1970 to 1972. He later became a professor at the Autonomous University of Barcelona where he taught Economic Theory. He is an Honorary Fellow at the London School of Economics.

== Political career ==
Serra served as the first democratically elected Mayor of Barcelona after Franco's dictatorship (from 1979 to 1982).

In the wake of the socialist victory in the 1982 Spanish general election, Serra was appointed Minister of Defense by Prime Minister Felipe González, and he succeeded Alfonso Guerra as Deputy Prime Minister in 1991. During his tenure as Minister of Defense, he promoted the legislative changes that resulted in the democratization of the Spanish armed forces, their effective integration in the NATO structure, and the participation in international missions for the first time. He resigned as Deputy Prime Minister in 1995, but remained a Member of the Spanish Congress of Deputies representing the Constituency of Barcelona until 2004. He first gained his seat in Parliament in the 1986 Spanish general election.

== Life after politics ==
In 2005, Serra was appointed president of Caixa Catalunya, a public savings bank. Following his resignation in 2011, he was tried for criminal mismanagement and abusive payments while he was chairman of the ailed savings bank. He was absolved of all charges in February 2019.

Serra has been the chairman of the Institut Barcelona d'Estudis Internacionals (IBEI) since its foundation in 2004. He currently teaches courses on Strategy, Military Reform and Peace Building as part of the Master studies offered by the institute.

== Other activities ==
=== Corporate boards ===
- Telefónica Chile, Member of the Board of Directors

=== Non-profit organizations ===
- European Council on Foreign Relations (ECFR), Member
- European Leadership Network (ELN), Senior Member

Political offices
Preceded by New title	Regional Minister of Town and Country Town and Public Works; 1977–1979	Succeeded by Lluís Armet i Coma
Preceded by Manuel Font i Altaba	Mayor of Barcelona; 1979 – 1982	Succeeded by Pasqual Maragall
Preceded by Alberto Oliart Saussol	Minister of Defence; 1982–1991	Succeeded by Julián García Vargas
Preceded by Alfonso Guerra	Deputy Prime Minister of Spain; 1991–1995	Succeeded by Francisco Álvarez Cascos
Party political offices
Preceded by Raimon Obiols	First Secretary of PSC; 1996 – 2000	Succeeded by José Montilla
