= José Luis Corcuera =

Spanish politician (born 1944)

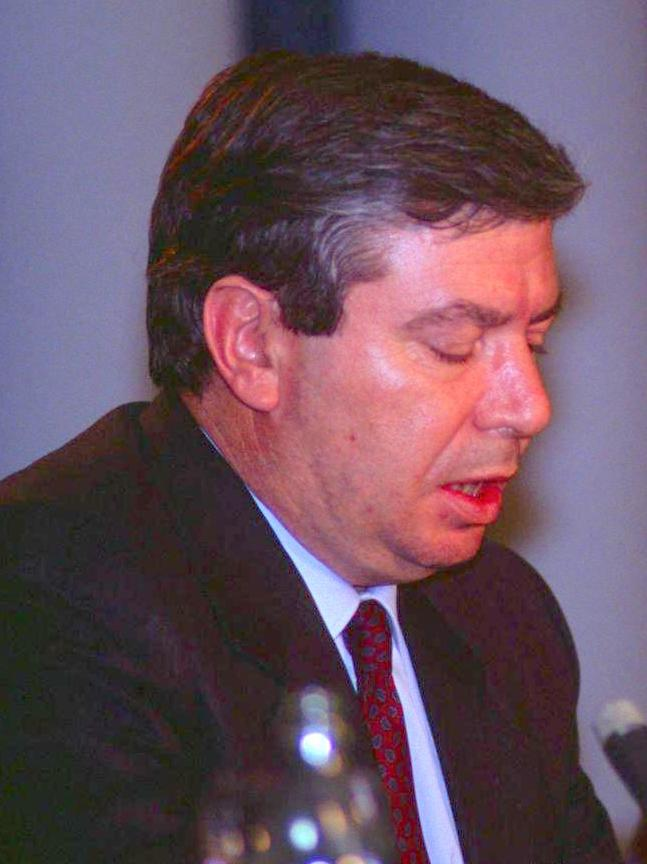
- José Luis Corcuera (1993)

Minister of Interior
- In office 12 July 1988 – 23 November 1993
- Prime Minister: Felipe González
- Preceded by: José Barrionuevo
- Succeeded by: Antoni Asunción Hernández

Personal details
- Born: 1944 (age 81–82)

José Luis Corcuera (born 1944) is a Spanish politician who served as interior minister of Spain from 1988 to 1993.

== Early life ==
Corcuera hails from a Basque family. He was born in 1944 and was raised in Bilbao. He left school at 14.

== Career ==
Corcuera headed the General Workers Union, a socialist trade union. He was a member of the Spanish Congress of Deputies, representing Biscay Province from 1982 to 1986 and Burgos Province from 1993 to 1994. He was appointed interior minister to the cabinet led by Prime Minister Felipe González in a reshuffle on 12 July 1988, replacing José Barrionuevo in the post. He retained his post in a cabinet reshuffle of July 1993. However, on 23 November 1993 he resigned from office due to the fact that the bill he developed, the Corcuera law, was declared unlawful. Antoni Asunción replaced him as interior minister. Corcuera also resigned from his parliamentary seat.

=== Controversy ===
In September 2001, Corcuera and José Barrionuevo were tried for the misuse of the public funds which occurred in 1993. Both were found innocent of embezzlement charges in January 2002.

=== In popular culture ===
In a detective novel entitled Sabotaje olímpico (Spanish: Olympic Sabotage) written by Manuel Vázquez Montalbán there are frequent references to Corcuera as the interior minister in a critical manner.
