= 2004 Spanish general election =

- 14 March 2004

All 350 seats in the Congress of Deputies and 208 (of 259) seats in the Senate 176 seats needed for a majority in the Congress of Deputies
- Opinion polls
- Registered: 34,571,831 ▲1.8%
- Turnout: 26,155,436 (75.7%) ▲7.0 pp
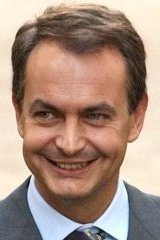

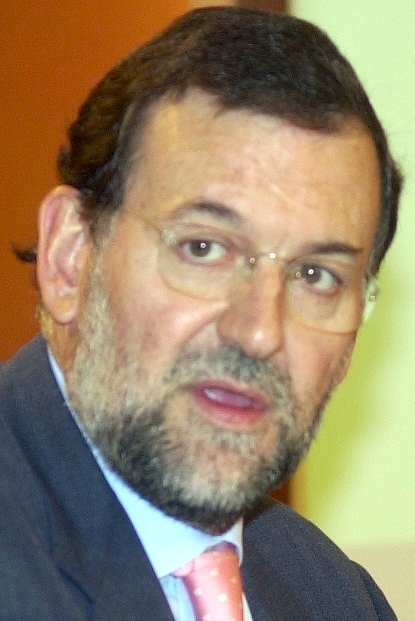

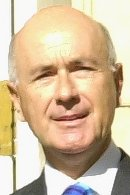

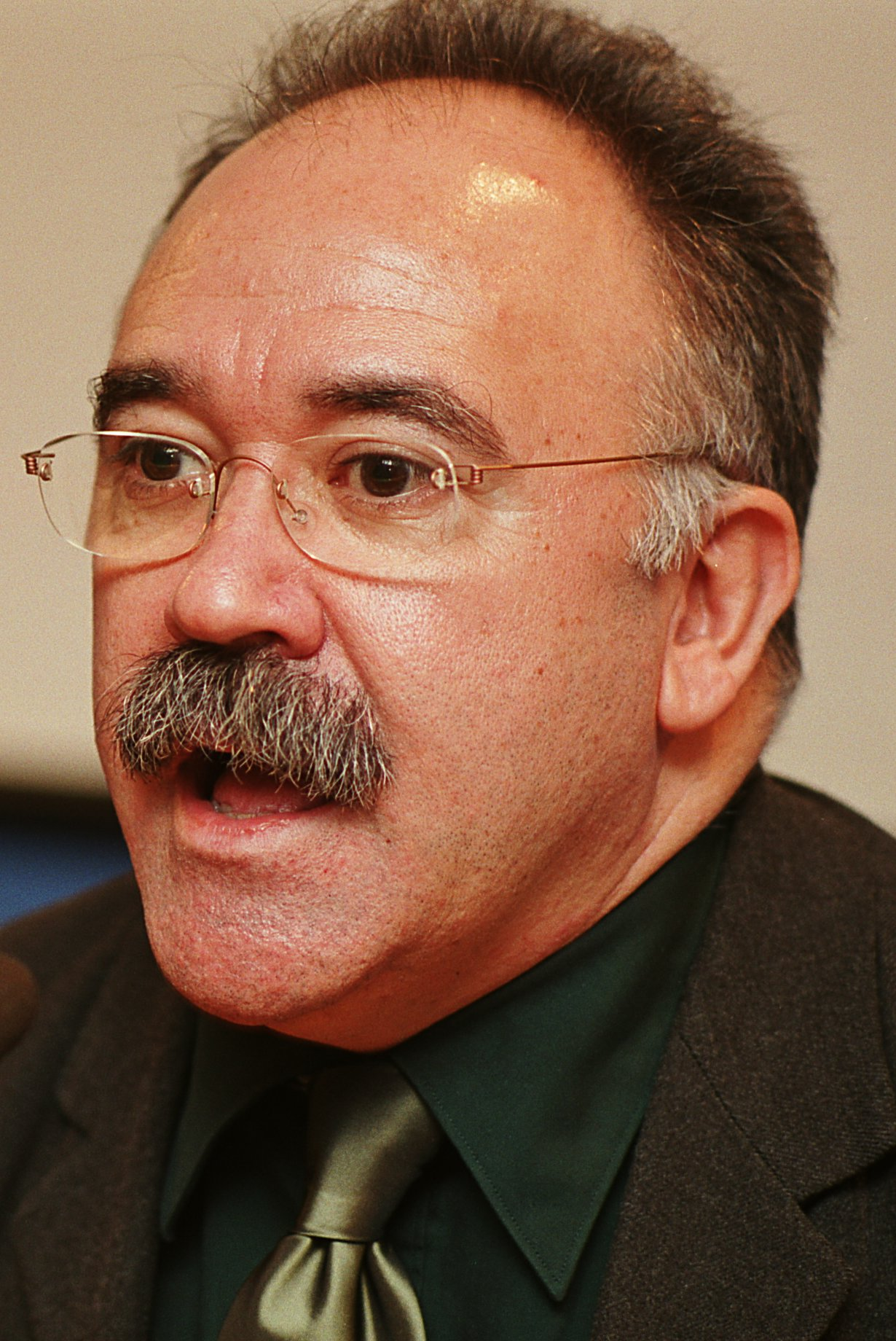

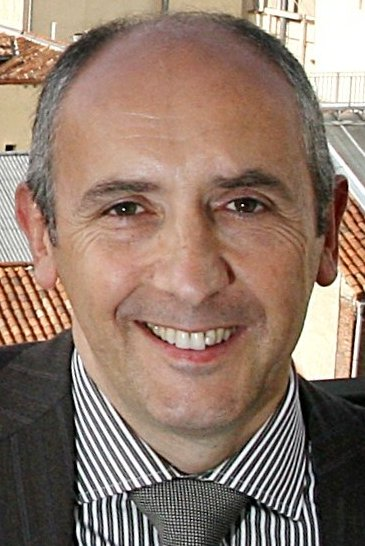

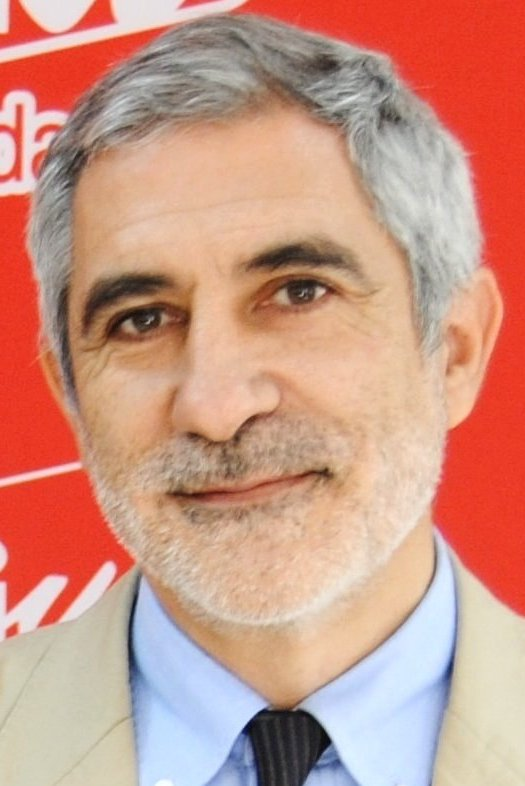
	First party	Second party	Third party
Leader	José Luis Rodríguez Zapatero	Mariano Rajoy	Josep Antoni Duran i Lleida
Party	PSOE	PP	CiU
Leader since	22 July 2000	2 September 2003	24 January 2004
Leader's seat	Madrid	Madrid	Barcelona
Last election	125 seats, 34.2% (Note: Results for PSOE–p (34.2%, 125 deputies) and PREx–CREx (0.0%, 0 deputies) in the 2000 Congress election.)	183 seats, 44.5%	15 seats, 4.2%
Seats won	164	148	10
Seat change	▲39	▼35	▼5
Popular vote	11,026,163	9,763,144	835,471
Percentage	42.6%	37.7%	3.2%
Swing	▲8.3 pp	▼6.8 pp	▼1.0 pp
	Fourth party	Fifth party	Sixth party
Leader	Josep-Lluís Carod-Rovira	Josu Erkoreka	Gaspar Llamazares
Party	ERC	EAJ/PNV	IU
Leader since	2 February 2004	2004	29 October 2000
Leader's seat	Barcelona	Biscay	Madrid
Last election	1 seat, 0.8%	7 seats, 1.5%	9 seats, 6.0% (Note: Results for IU (5.4%, 8 deputies) and IC–V (0.5%, 1 deputy) in the 2000 Congress election.)
Seats won	8	7	5
Seat change	▲7	0	▼4
Popular vote	652,196	420,980	1,284,081
Percentage	2.5%	1.6%	5.0%
Swing	▲1.7 pp	▲0.1 pp	▼1.0 pp
Prime Minister before election
José María Aznar
PP
Prime Minister after election
José Luis Rodríguez Zapatero
PSOE

A general election was held in Spain on 14 March 2004 to elect the members of the 8th Cortes Generales under the Spanish Constitution of 1978. All 350 seats in the Congress of Deputies were up for election, as well as 208 of 259 seats in the Senate. It was held concurrently with a regional election in Andalusia.

Since 2000, the ruling People's Party (PP) had governed with a parliamentary absolute majority, allowing it to renegue from its previous agreements with peripheral nationalist parties. This period saw sustained economic growth, but the controversial management—and, at times, attempted cover-up—of a number of crises affected the standing of Aznar's government and fostered perceptions of arrogance: these included the Gescartera affair, the Prestige oil spill and the Yak-42 plane crash. A reform of unemployment benefits led to a general strike in 2002, and the unpopular decision to intervene in the Iraq War sparked massive protests across Spain. The incumbent prime minister, José María Aznar, renounced to seek a third term at the 2002 party congress, being replaced as candidate by the first deputy prime minister, Mariano Rajoy. The opposition Spanish Socialist Workers' Party (PSOE) elected José Luis Rodríguez Zapatero as new leader in July 2000, under a platform of party renewal. The fight against terrorism (particularly from the Basque separatist ETA group) and the need for political change were themes that dominated party campaigns going into the election.

The electoral outcome was heavily influenced by the Madrid train bombings on 11 March, which saw Aznar's government blaming ETA for the attacks in spite of mounting evidence suggesting Islamist authorship. The ruling PP was accused by the opposition of staging a disinformation campaign to prevent the blame on the bombings being linked to Spain's involvement in Iraq. Election results saw Zapatero's PSOE securing an unprecedented 11 million votes, with a net gain of 39 seats up to 164, whereas the PP (which had been predicted by opinion polls to secure a diminished but still commanding victory) was left in shock as it unexpectedly lost 35 seats in the worst defeat for a sitting Spanish government up to that point since 1982. Republican Left of Catalonia benefitted from the impact of the Carod affair—the revelation that party leader Josep-Lluís Carod-Rovira had held a meeting with ETA shortly after joining the regional government of Pasqual Maragall—which gave the party publicity to the detriment of Convergence and Union. The 75.7% voter turnout was among the highest since the Spanish transition to democracy and was attributed to public shock and grief caused by the Madrid attacks, with no subsequent general election having exceeded such figure. The number of votes cast, at 26.1 million votes, remained the highest figure in gross terms for any Spanish election until April 2019.

The results were described by some media as an "unprecedented electoral upset". Perceived PP abuses and public rejection at Spain's involvement in Iraq were said to help fuel a wave of discontent against the incumbent ruling party, with Aznar's mismanagement of the 11M bombings serving as the final catalyst for change to happen. Zapatero announced his will to form a minority PSOE government, seeking the parliamentary support of other parties once elected.

== Background ==
The People's Party (PP) secured an absolute majority of seats for the first time ever in the 2000 general election, which allowed José María Aznar to be re-elected for a second term as prime minister of Spain. The defeat of the Spanish Socialist Workers' Party (PSOE) prompted the resignation of party leader Joaquín Almunia and a leadership contest being triggered. A dark horse candidate, José Luis Rodríguez Zapatero, emerged as new leader in a surprise victory over the president of Castilla–La Mancha, José Bono, by adhering to a "New Way" position that proposed party renewal and internal reform.

With a low unemployment under Spanish standards and the country's economy growing at a steady pace, Aznar's second government continued its liberalization policy in a wide range of activities (including sectors previously subject to state monopoly), as well as the completion of the privatization of the Iberia airline (postponed several times over pilots' opposition, adverse economic conditions and failed acquisition talks). Together with the continued inflow of European funds, this provided Spain with extraordinary revenues that contributed to curb the fiscal deficit and reduce public debt, though the Spanish government's overreliance on housing as an economic locomotive generated a real-estate bubble due to a rise in speculation. The cash rounding resulting from the final replacement of the Spanish peseta by the euro on 1 January 2002 also led to a rise in the inflation rate.

Domestically, Aznar dealt with the mad cow crisis early into his second term (with the first confirmed case of the disease in Spain), as well as a diplomatic standoff with the United Kingdom over the HMS Tireless's presence in Gibraltar for repairs. The Gescartera affair in 2001 (a major financial scandal involving fraud, misappropriation of funds and influence peddling by the homonym investment company) saw the resignations of the then treasury state secretary and the president of the National Securities Market Commission. On the issue of immigration, Aznar's government reformed the Aliens Law to curtail some migrants' rights and introduce harsher entry restrictions, a faster deportation process, and tighter conditions for travel visas. An attempt by the government to tighten unemployment benefits and other working conditions through decree-law led to a general strike in 2002, forcing the proposal—later struck by the Constitutional Court of Spain in 2007—to be watered down. The Perejil Island crisis in July 2002, which saw a Royal Moroccan Navy squad temporarily occupy the uninhabited island, was resolved after a bloodless intervention by the Spanish military. Finally, a proposal for a water transfer from the Ebro river to south-eastern provinces to supply tourism and agriculture was criticized as poorly planned and met with mass protests, particularly in Aragon and Catalonia.

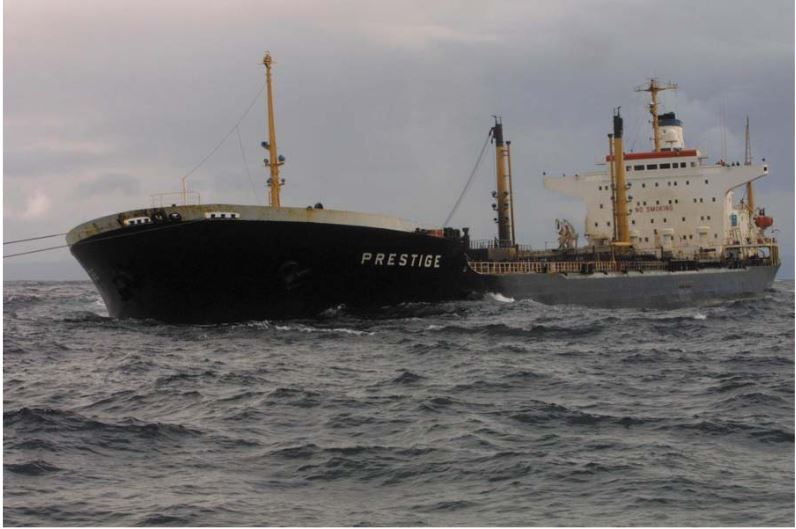
The Prestige oil spill in November 2002 became Spain's biggest environmental crisis and came to be seen in the country as a symbol of government mismanagement.

Terrorism became a major issue, with the ETA group conducting major attacks such as the killings of Ernest Lluch (a former health minister), the October 2000 Madrid bombing which killed a Supreme Court judge, or the 2001 Madrid bombing injuring 99. PP and PSOE signed the 2000 Anti-Terrorist Pact, and a new Political Parties Law was passed in 2002 which allowed the banning of the Batasuna party over its links and support to ETA's actions. The increase of counterterrorism cooperation with France and the European Union, together with renewed police action, eroded ETA's operational capacity. Concurrently, and in opposition to Aznar's hardline position against ETA violence, the Basque Nationalist Party under Juan José Ibarretxe sought to resolve the Basque conflict through sovereigntism and broad-based talks, a position endorsed by voters at the snap 2001 Basque election. Following failed talks with the Spanish government, Ibarretxe laid out a peace scheme in 2003—dubbed the Ibarretxe Plan—that envisaged a referendum to decide on a proposed reform of the Basque Statute of Autonomy which, if approved, would turn the Basque Country into an associated state on an equal footing with Spain (including a right to self-determination).

This period saw the controversial management of a number of crises by Aznar's government, with criticism over the perceived cover-up nature of its actions—frequently through denialism and diffusion of responsibility—negatively affecting its public standing and fostering a perception of arrogance in the exercise of power. The Prestige oil spill in November 2002 saw extensive damage to the coast of Galicia in what was described as Spain's biggest environmental crisis: the government's decision to tow the ailing wreck out to sea rather than allow it to take refuge in a sheltered port was seen as a major contributing factor to the disaster's scale. The Yak-42 plane crash in May 2003, with the death of all 75 occupants, saw a misidentification of bodies (with some remains being returned to the wrong relatives and others being mixed-up) as well as questions on the plane's poor condition and the pilots' readiness.

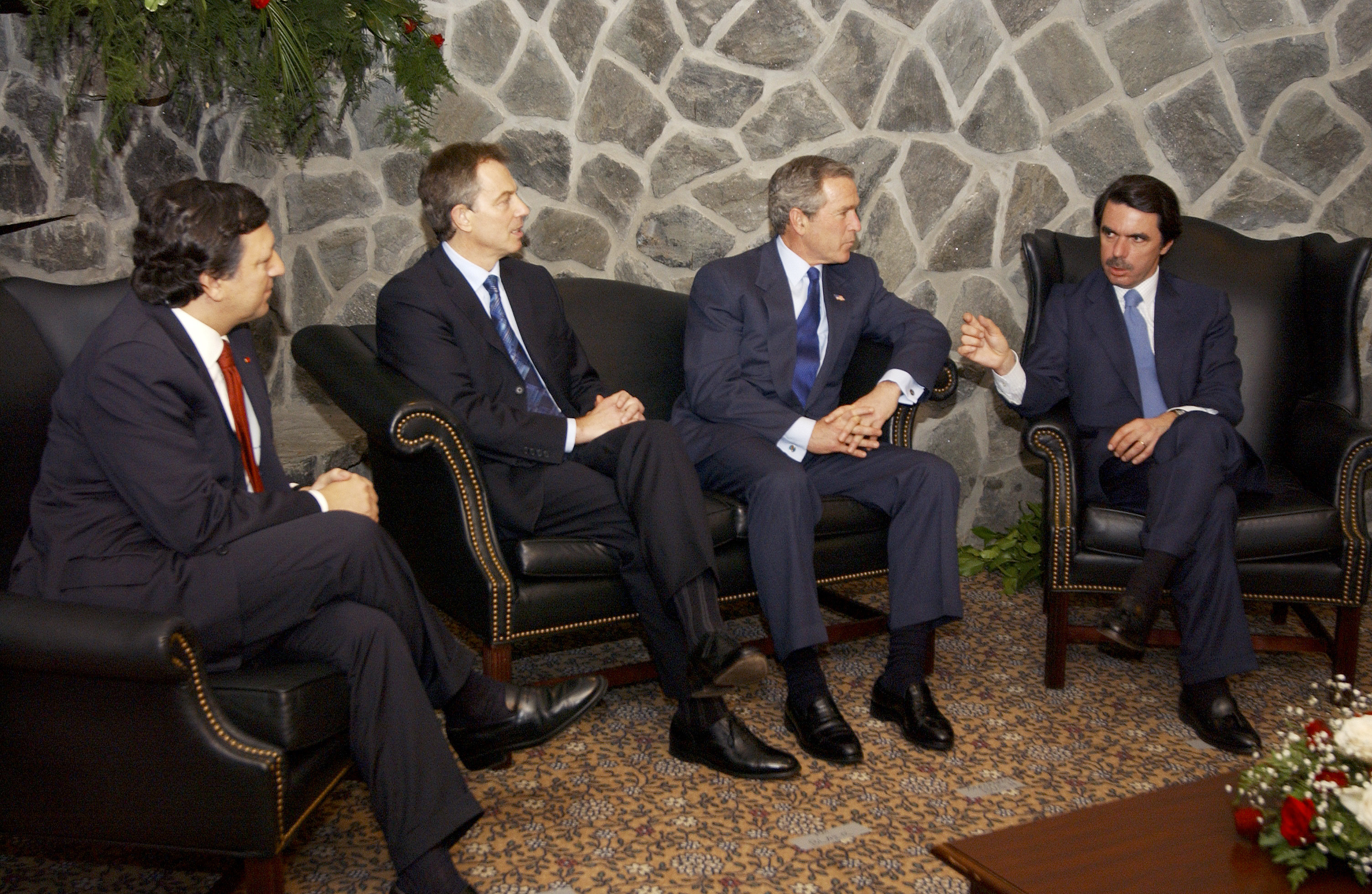
The Azores Summit preceded the U.S. invasion of Iraq, which was unpopular among the Spanish public and led to anti-war protests.

Internationally, the election of George W. Bush as U.S. president and the 9/11 attacks in 2000 saw Spain aligning closer to the United States, with Aznar backing Bush's missile shield, war on terror and invasion of Afghanistan, in exchange for U.S. support to Spain's fight against ETA's terrorism. Spain's rapprochement to Bush's United States and Tony Blair's United Kingdom, and their unsuccessful attempts to secure a new UN Security Council resolution that could lead to war—superseding Resolution 1441—culminated in the Azores Summit on 16 March 2003, which led to the subsequent invasion of Iraq under the alleged aim of disarming Saddam Hussein's regime of "weapons of mass destruction". The Spanish government's decision to intervene in the Iraq War proved highly unpopular among the public, sparking massive anti-war protests across the country. Aznar had also hinted at withdrawing from politics after two consecutive terms, a decision he confirmed at the 2002 PP congress, while also rejecting running for parliament. The first deputy prime minister, Mariano Rajoy, was selected to succeed him in September 2003.

Despite Aznar's growing unpopularity, the PP was able to come out of the 2003 local and regional elections with limited losses. The outcome of the regional election in Madrid was significant: it hinted at the formation of a left-wing coalition government in Spain's capital region, but the Tamayazo parliamentary scandal (seeing two PSOE legislators break party discipline) thwarted the regional PSOE leader's investiture and forced a repeat election in October in which PP's Esperanza Aguirre secured a majority. The 2003 Catalan election saw the Socialists' Party of Catalonia (PSC)—PSOE's sister party—oust the nationalist Convergence and Union from the regional government after 23 years of uninterrupted rule, with a tripartite cabinet between PSC, Republican Left of Catalonia (ERC) and Initiative for Catalonia Greens being formed under Pasqual Maragall. Maragall's government came under fire in January 2004 after it was unveiled that its deputy head, ERC's Josep-Lluís Carod-Rovira, had held a secret meeting with ETA to negotiate a Catalonia-limited ceasefire, in what became known as the Carod affair. While Carod-Rovira denied all claims of deal-seeking, the public backlash prompted him to apologize and resign from his cabinet posts.

== Overview ==
Under the 1978 Constitution, the Spanish Cortes Generales were conceived as an imperfect bicameral system. The Congress of Deputies held greater legislative power than the Senate, having the ability to grant or withdraw confidence from a prime minister and to override Senate vetoes by an absolute majority. Nonetheless, the Senate retained a limited number of specific functions—such as ratifying international treaties, authorizing cooperation agreements between autonomous communities, enforcing direct rule, regulating interterritorial compensation funds, and taking part in constitutional amendments and in the appointment of members to the Constitutional Court and the General Council of the Judiciary—which were not subject to override by Congress.

=== Date ===
The term of each chamber of the Cortes Generales—the Congress and the Senate—expired four years from the date of their previous election, unless they were dissolved earlier. The election decree was required to be issued no later than 25 days before the scheduled expiration date of parliament and published on the following day in the Official State Gazette (BOE), with election day taking place 54 days after the decree's publication. The previous election was held on 12 March 2000, which meant that the chambers' terms would have expired on 12 March 2004. The election decree was required to be published in the BOE no later than 17 February 2004, setting the latest possible date for election day on 11 April 2004.

The prime minister had the prerogative to propose the monarch to dissolve both chambers at any given time—either jointly or separately—and call a snap election, provided that no motion of no confidence was in process, no state of emergency was in force and that dissolution did not occur before one year after a previous one. Additionally, both chambers were to be dissolved and a new election called if an investiture process failed to elect a prime minister within a two-month period from the first ballot. Barring this exception, there was no constitutional requirement for simultaneous elections to the Congress and the Senate. Still, as of 2026, there has been no precedent of separate elections taking place under the 1978 Constitution.

On 9 January 2004, Aznar announced the election date for 14 March, concurrently with the 2004 Andalusian regional election; earlier speculation also hinted at either 29 February or 7 March as possible dates.

The Cortes Generales were officially dissolved on 20 January 2004 with the publication of the corresponding decree in the BOE, setting election day for 14 March and scheduling for both chambers to reconvene on 2 April.

=== Electoral system ===
Voting for each chamber of the Cortes Generales was based on universal suffrage, comprising all Spanish nationals over 18 years of age with full political rights, provided that they had not been deprived of the right to vote by a final sentence, nor were legally incapacitated.

The Congress of Deputies had a minimum of 300 and a maximum of 400 seats, with electoral provisions fixing its size at 350. Of these, 348 were elected in 50 multi-member constituencies corresponding to the provinces of Spain—each of which was assigned an initial minimum of two seats and the remaining 248 distributed in proportion to population—using the D'Hondt method and closed-list proportional voting, with a three percent-threshold of valid votes (including blank ballots) in each constituency. The remaining two seats were allocated to Ceuta and Melilla as single-member districts elected by plurality voting. The use of this electoral method resulted in a higher effective threshold depending on district magnitude and vote distribution.

As a result of the aforementioned allocation, each Congress multi-member constituency was entitled the following seats:

Seats	Constituencies
35	Madrid^{(+1)}
31	Barcelona
16	Valencia
12	Seville^{(−1)}
11	Alicante
10	Málaga
9	A Coruña, Biscay, Cádiz, Murcia
8	Asturias^{(−1)}, Balearic Islands^{(+1)}, Las Palmas^{(+1)}
7	Córdoba, Granada, Pontevedra^{(−1)}, Santa Cruz de Tenerife, Zaragoza
6	Badajoz, Girona^{(+1)}, Guipúzcoa, Jaén, Tarragona
5	Almería, Cantabria, Castellón, Ciudad Real, Huelva, León, Navarre, Toledo, Valladolid
4	Álava, Albacete, Burgos, Cáceres^{(−1)}, La Rioja, Lleida, Lugo, Ourense, Salamanca
3	Ávila, Cuenca, Guadalajara, Huesca, Palencia, Segovia, Soria, Teruel, Zamora

208 Senate seats were elected using open-list (Note: Parties could group candidates into lists, although each candidate was treated separately for the purpose of the voting procedure.) partial block voting: voters in constituencies electing four seats could choose up to three candidates; in those with two or three seats, up to two; and in single-member districts, one. Each of the 47 peninsular provinces was allocated four seats, while in insular provinces—such as the Balearic and Canary Islands—the districts were the islands themselves, with the larger ones (Mallorca, Gran Canaria and Tenerife) being allocated three seats each, and the smaller ones (Menorca, Ibiza–Formentera, Fuerteventura, La Gomera, El Hierro, Lanzarote and La Palma) one each. Ceuta and Melilla elected two seats each. Additionally, autonomous communities could appoint at least one senator each and were entitled to one additional seat per million inhabitants.

The law did not provide for by-elections to fill vacant seats; instead, any vacancies arising after the proclamation of candidates and during the legislative term were filled by the next candidates on the party lists or, when required, by designated substitutes.

=== Outgoing parliament ===
The tables below show the composition of the parliamentary groups in both chambers at the time of dissolution.

Parliamentary composition in January 2004
Congress of Deputies
Groups	Parties	Deputies	
Groups	Parties	Seats	Total
People's Parliamentary Group in the Congress	PP	180	183
People's Parliamentary Group in the Congress	UPN	3	183
Socialist Parliamentary Group	PSOE	107	124
Socialist Parliamentary Group	PSC	17	124
Catalan Parliamentary Group (Convergence and Union)	CDC	11	15
Catalan Parliamentary Group (Convergence and Union)	UDC	4	15
United Left's Federal Parliamentary Group	IU	8	8
Basque Parliamentary Group (EAJ/PNV)	EAJ/PNV	7	7
Canarian Coalition's Parliamentary Group	AIC	2	4
Canarian Coalition's Parliamentary Group	ICAN	2	4
Mixed Parliamentary Group	BNG	3	9
Mixed Parliamentary Group	PA	1	9
Mixed Parliamentary Group	ERC	1	9
Mixed Parliamentary Group	ICV	1	9
Mixed Parliamentary Group	EA	1	9
Mixed Parliamentary Group	CHA	1	9
Mixed Parliamentary Group	INDEP	1 (Note: Cristina Alberdi, former PSOE legislator.)	9

Parliamentary composition in January 2004
Senate
Groups	Parties	Senators	
Groups	Parties	Seats	Total
People's Parliamentary Group in the Senate	PP	147	150
People's Parliamentary Group in the Senate	UPN	3	150
Socialist Parliamentary Group	PSOE	67	67
Catalan Agreement of Progress; Parliamentary Group	PSC	9	12
Catalan Agreement of Progress; Parliamentary Group	ERC	2	12
Catalan Agreement of Progress; Parliamentary Group	ICV	1	12
Convergence and Union's; Catalan Parliamentary Group in the Senate	CDC	7	10
Convergence and Union's; Catalan Parliamentary Group in the Senate	UDC	3	10
Basque Nationalist Senators' Parliamentary Group	EAJ/PNV	7	7
Canarian Coalition Senators' Parliamentary Group	AIC	2	6
Canarian Coalition Senators' Parliamentary Group	ICAN	2	6
Canarian Coalition Senators' Parliamentary Group	AHI	1	6
Canarian Coalition Senators' Parliamentary Group	AM	1	6
Mixed Parliamentary Group	IU	3	7
Mixed Parliamentary Group	BNG	1	7
Mixed Parliamentary Group	PAR	1	7
Mixed Parliamentary Group	PIL	1	7
Mixed Parliamentary Group	INDEP	1 (Note: Enrique Bellido, former PP legislator.)	7

== Candidates ==
=== Nomination rules ===
Spanish citizens with the right to vote could run for election, provided that they had not been criminally imprisoned by a final sentence or convicted—whether final or not—of offences that involved loss of eligibility or disqualification from public office (such as rebellion, terrorism or other crimes against the state). Additional causes of ineligibility applied to the following officials:

- Members of the Spanish royal family and their spouses;
- Holders of a number of senior public or institutional posts, including the heads and members of higher courts and state institutions; (Note: These comprised the Constitutional Court, the General Council of the Judiciary, the Supreme Court, the Council of State, the Court of Auditors and the Economic and Social Council.) the Ombudsman; the State's Attorney General; high-ranking officials of government departments, the Office of the Prime Minister and other state agencies; government delegates in the autonomous communities; the director-general of RTVE; the director of the Electoral Register Office; the governor and deputy governor of the Bank of Spain; the heads of official credit institutions; and members of electoral commissions and of the Nuclear Safety Council;
- Heads of diplomatic missions abroad;
- Judges and public prosecutors in active service;
- Members of the Armed Forces and law enforcement bodies in active service.

Other ineligibility provisions also applied to a number of territorial officials in these categories within their areas of jurisdiction, as well as to employees of foreign states and members of regional governments.

Incompatibility rules included those of ineligibility, and also barred running in multiple constituencies or lists, and combining legislative roles (deputy, senator, and regional lawmaker) with each other or with:

- A number of senior public or institutional posts, including the presidency of the Competition Defence Court; and leadership positions in RTVE, government offices, public authorities (such as port authorities, hydrographic confederations, or highway concessionary companies), public entities and state-owned or publicly funded companies;
- Any other paid public or private position, except university teaching.

=== Parties and lists ===
The electoral law allowed for parties and federations registered in the interior ministry, alliances and groupings of electors to present lists of candidates. Parties and federations intending to form an alliance were required to inform the relevant electoral commission within 10 days of the election call, whereas groupings of electors needed to secure the signature of at least one percent of the electorate in the constituencies for which they sought election, disallowing electors from signing for more than one list.

Below is a list of the main parties and alliances which contested the election:

Candidacy	Parties and alliances	Leading candidate	Ideology	Previous result				Gov.	Ref.
Candidacy	Parties and alliances	Leading candidate	Ideology	Congress		Senate		Gov.	Ref.
Candidacy	Parties and alliances	Leading candidate	Ideology	Vote %	Seats	Vote %	Seats	Gov.	Ref.
PP	List: People's Party (PP); Navarrese People's Union (UPN); Valencian Union (UV); Independents of Fuerteventura (IF)	Mariano Rajoy	Conservatism; Christian democracy	44.5%	183	45.4%	127	Yes	
PSOE	List: Spanish Socialist Workers' Party (PSOE); Socialists' Party of Catalonia (PSC); The Greens (LV)	José Luis Rodríguez Zapatero	Social democracy	34.2%	125	26.3%	53	No	
CiU	List: Convergence and Union (CiU) – Democratic Convergence of Catalonia (CDC) – Democratic Union of Catalonia (UDC)	Josep Antoni Duran i Lleida	Catalan nationalism Centrism	4.2%	15	4.5%	8	No	
IU	List: United Left (IU) – Communist Party of Spain (PCE) – Collective for the Unity of Workers–Andalusian Left Bloc (CUT–BAI) – Revolutionary Workers' Party (POR) – Workers' Revolutionary Party–Revolutionary Left (PRT–IR); Initiative for Catalonia Greens–United and Alternative Left (ICV–EUiA) – Initiative for Catalonia Greens (ICV) – United and Alternative Left (EUiA); Bloc for Asturias (BA); The Greens of Aragon (LV); The Greens–United Left–Citizens' Alternative Initiative (LV–IU–AC25M) – 25 May Citizens' Alternative (AC25M); Independent Socialists of Extremadura (SIEx); United Left–The Agreement (Entesa) – United Left of the Valencian Country (EUPV) – Republican Left (IR)	Gaspar Llamazares	Socialism; Communism	6.0%	9	7.7%	0	No	
EAJ/PNV	List: Basque Nationalist Party (EAJ/PNV)	Josu Erkoreka	Basque nationalism Christian democracy	1.5% (Note: Results in the 2000 Congress election, not including Navarre.)	7	1.6% (Note: Results in the 2000 Senate election, not including Navarre.)	6	No	
CC	List: Canarian Independent Groups (AIC) – Tenerife Group of Independents (ATI) – La Palma Group of Independents (API) – Gomera Group of Independents (AGI); Nationalist Canarian Initiative (ICAN); Nationalist Canarian Centre (CCN); Canarian Nationalist Party (PNC); Independent Herrenian Group (AHI); Majorera Assembly (AM)	Paulino Rivero	Regionalism; Canarian nationalism Centrism	1.1%	4	0.7%	5	No	
BNG	List: Galician Nationalist Bloc (BNG) – Galician People's Union (UPG) – Socialist Collective (CS) – Galician Nationalist Party–Galicianist Party (PNG–PG) – Nationalist Left (EN) – Inzar (Inzar)	Francisco Rodríguez	Galician nationalism Left-wing nationalism Socialism	1.3%	3	1.4%	0	No	
PA	List: Andalusian Party (PA)	José Antonio González	Andalusian nationalism Social democracy	0.9%	1	0.9%	0	No	
ERC	List: Republican Left of Catalonia (ERC)	Josep-Lluís Carod-Rovira	Catalan independence Left-wing nationalism Social democracy	0.8%	1	Contested in alliance (Note: PSC–PSOE (7 senators), ERC (1 senator) and IC–V (0 senators) contested the 2000 Senate election within the Entesa alliance.)		No	
EA	List: Basque Solidarity (EA)	Begoña Lasagabaster	Basque nationalism Social democracy	0.4%	1	0.4%	0	No	
CHA	List: Aragonese Union (CHA)	José Antonio Labordeta	Aragonese nationalism Eco-socialism	0.3%	1	0.3%	0	No	
NaBai	List: Basque Solidarity (EA); Aralar (Aralar); Basque Nationalist Party (EAJ/PNV); Assembly (Batzarre)	Uxue Barkos	Basque nationalism Social democracy	0.1% (Note: Results for EA (0.1%, 0 deputies) and EAJ/PNV in Navarre (0.0%, 0 deputies) in the 2000 Congress election.)	0	0.1% (Note: Results for EA (0.1%, 0 senators) and EAJ/PNV in Navarre (0.0%, 0 senators) in the 2000 Senate election.)	0	No	
PSC–ERC– ICV–EUiA	List: Socialists' Party of Catalonia (PSC); Republican Left of Catalonia (ERC); Initiative for Catalonia Greens (ICV); United and Alternative Left (EUiA)	Mercedes Aroz	Catalanism; Social democracy Eco-socialism	Did not contest		6.0%	8	No	

The Socialists' Party of Catalonia, ERC and Initiative for Catalonia Greens agreed to continue with the Catalan Agreement of Progress alliance for the Senate with the inclusion of United and Alternative Left. In the Balearic Islands, PSM–Nationalist Agreement, United Left of the Balearic Islands, The Greens of the Balearic Islands and ERC formed the Progressives for the Balearic Islands alliance. A proposal for an all-left electoral alliance for the Senate in the Valencian Community, comprising the PSOE, United Left of the Valencian Country and the Valencian Nationalist Bloc, was ultimately discarded.

== Campaign ==
=== Party slogans ===
Party or alliance	Original slogan	English translation	Ref.
PP	« Juntos vamos a más »	"Together we go further"	
PSOE	« Merecemos una España mejor »	"We deserve a better Spain"	
CiU	« Duran per Catalunya: sentit comú »	"Duran for Catalonia: common sense"	
IU	« Con tu voto, es posible. Palabra »	"With your vote, it is possible. Promise"	
EAJ/PNV	« Tú tienes la palabra » « Tu voz es importante en Madrid »	"You have the word" "Your voice is important in Madrid"	
CC	« Gana Canarias, ganas tú »	"The Canaries win, you win"	
BNG	« Dálle un Sí a Galiza »	"Give a Yes to Galicia"	
PA	« Andalucía es nuestro trabajo »	"Andalusia is our job"	
ERC	« Parlant la gent s'entén »	"People understand [each other] by talking"	
CHA	« Labordeta, gente como tú »	"Labordeta, people like you"	
NaBai	« Orain da geroa! » « ¡Ahora es el futuro! »	"The future is now!"	

=== Events and issues ===
The issues of terrorism and the State's model (with a particular focus on the major parties' relationship with peripheral nationalisms) featured predominantly in the campaign, particularly over the crisis in the Catalan government following the Carod affair and the political row in the Basque Country over the Ibarretxe Plan. Unemployment and economic progress were also campaign themes. On the issue of the Iraq War, the PSOE vowed to withdraw the 1,300 Spanish troops destined for the occupation of the country, whereas the PP advocated for a continued military presence and declined to reveal whether they would double the contingent of soldiers.

No leaders' debates were held in the 2004 general election campaign due to the PP's refusal to have one, particularly a face off between prime ministerial candidates Rajoy and Zapatero requested by the latter. Instead, the PP proposed having a debate with all twelve parties with parliamentary representation in the Congress of Deputies, but it was considered logistically complex. Previously, Rajoy had demanded an electoral debate with the leaders of the PSOE, IU and ERC. Las noticias del guiñol, a satirical news programme on Canal+, aired on 2 March a fictional debate between Rajoy and Zapatero using latex puppets.

=== Madrid train bombings ===
During the peak of Madrid rush hour on the morning of Thursday, 11 March 2004, ten explosions occurred aboard four commuter trains (cercanías) between Alcalá de Henares and Atocha station, killing 193 people and injuring around 2,500, in what would become the deadliest terrorist attack in the history of Spain and the deadliest in Europe since the Lockerbie bombing in 1988.

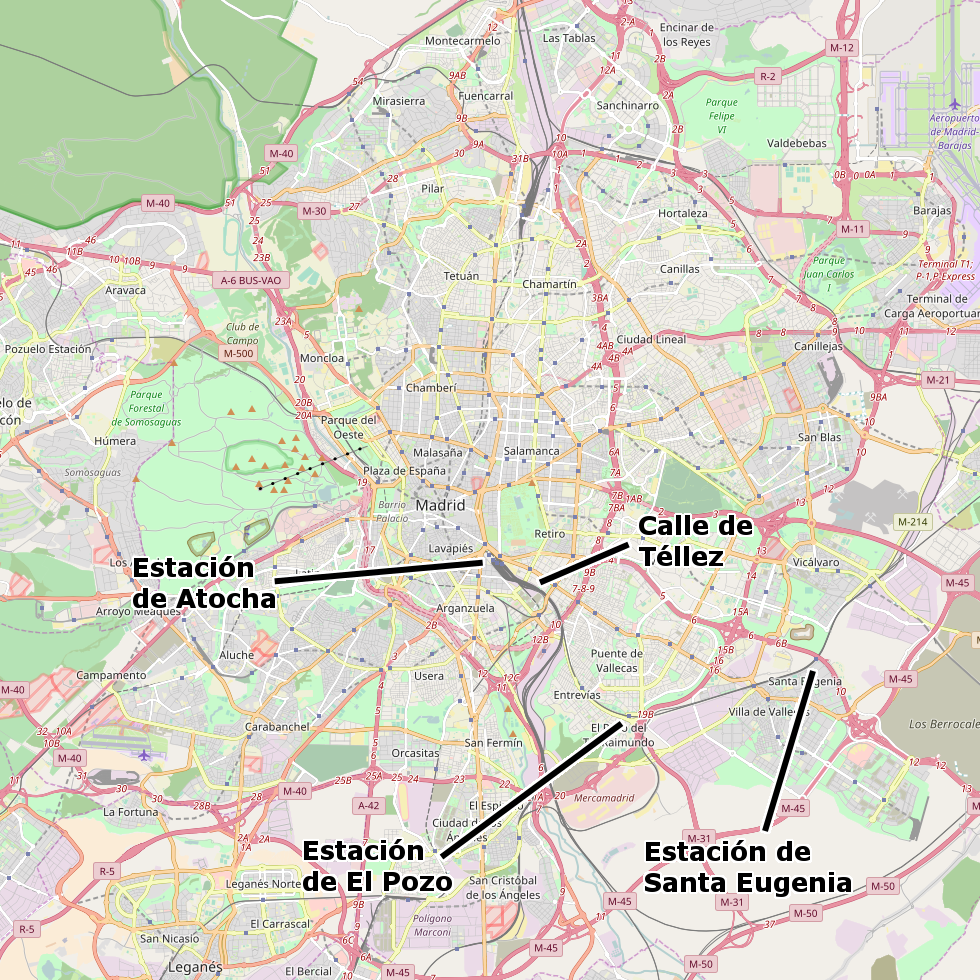
Map of the bombings.

In response to the bombings, political parties announced the suspension of their campaigns. At first, politicians from all parties—including the PSOE, CiU, IU, PNV, and ERC—blamed ETA. The Spanish government immediately declared three days of national mourning and claimed ETA's responsibility, with Prime Minister José María Aznar personally phoning newspaper editors to uphold this version at noon on the day of the attacks while dismissing any other authorship. Aznar's government also sent messages to all Spanish embassies abroad ordering that they uphold the version that ETA was responsible. However, ETA denied any involvement in the attacks, and evidence obtained by police and security forces started pointing to an Islamist authorship by the afternoon of 11 March; particularly, the discovery of a van containing a tape with Qur'anic verses and an al-Qaeda claim of responsibility being published by the Al-Quds Al-Arabi London Arabic-language newspaper. The government insisted on the ETA's authorship claim into 12 March (despite the discovery that day of a detonator that did not match those used by ETA) and, on the eve of the election, PP candidate Mariano Rajoy claimed in an El Mundo interview that he had "the moral conviction that it was ETA". By that point, however, interior minister Ángel Acebes had publicly acknowledged that the government had not "closed off any line of investigation".

In the days previous to the election, millions of Spaniards took to the streets in massive demonstrations across the country to condemn terrorism and express solidarity for the victims, but also to demand answers about the attacks—with cabinet members at the Madrid demonstration on 12 March being met with booing and shouts of "Who did it?"—amid growing concerns that the government was deliberately concealing evidence from the public to seek political advantage in the election.

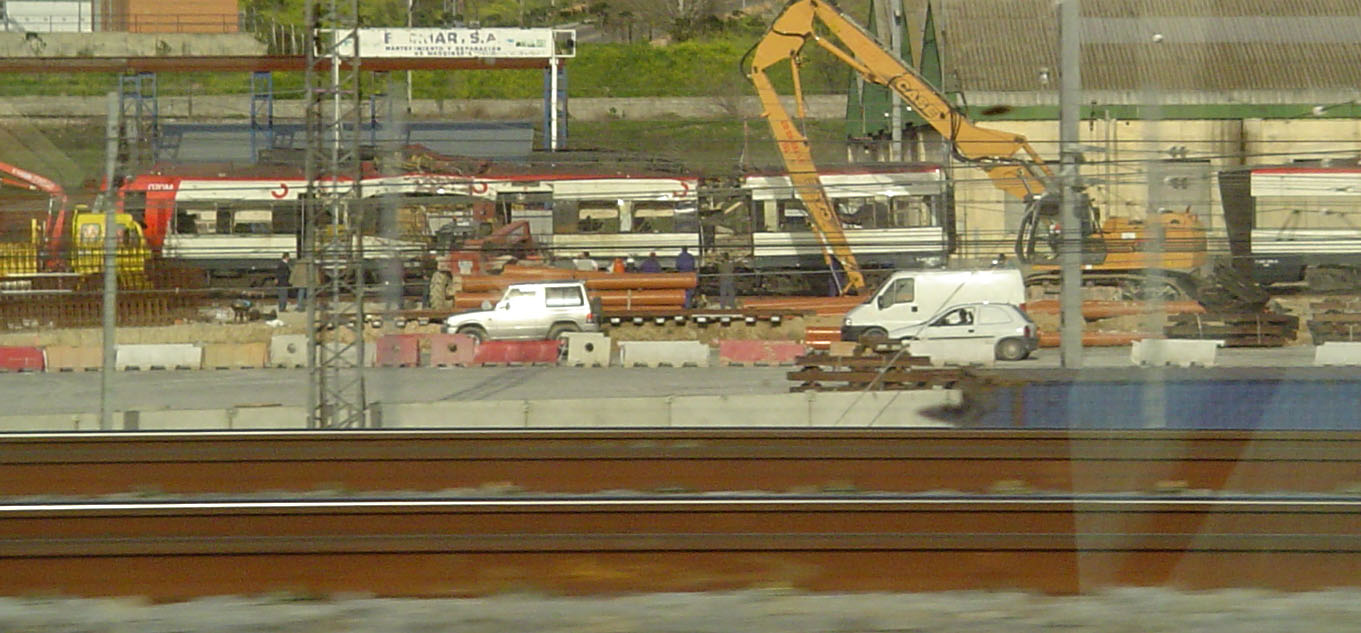
Remains of a commuter train after the bombings.

During the day of election silence on 13 March, spontaneous cell phone messages ending in the catchphrase "pass it on" (Spanish: Pásalo) invoked thousands to unofficial demonstrations in front of the ruling PP's headquarters in major cities throughout the country, blaming the attacks on Aznar's decision to engage in the Iraq War (with shouts of "your war, our dead" and "murderers"). On the evening of that day, the Spanish government announced the arrest of three Moroccans and two Indians, concurrently with the discovery of a videotape from a purported al-Qaeda official claiming responsibility for the attacks. This stirred further anti-government unrest throughout the country demanding to "being told the truth", which prompted Rajoy to issue a statement denouncing that the "illegal" protests constituted "undemocratic acts of pressure on tomorrow's election", and accusing the opposition PSOE of staging them. PSOE's campaign manager, Alfredo Pérez Rubalcaba, replied in a press briefing rejecting Rajoy's accusations and condemning the government's handling of the crisis, revealing that party leaders had been aware for many hours that the main line of police investigation into the attacks was now pointing to Islamism—information which the government withheld from its public statements—and that they were never going to "use terrorism for political purposes", while uttering that "the Spanish people deserve a government that doesn't lie to them, that always tells them the truth". By the end of the night, the entire opposition was accusing the PP government of manipulating and concealing information on the bombings.

In the ensuing years, several sources would claim that the prospective electoral influence of the bombings was discussed in an emergency government meeting held on 11 March, which focused on the massacre's authorship: if ETA was proven to be responsible, it would favour the PP's hardline campaign on terrorism in a rally 'round the flag effect, but if an Islamist group appeared to have caused the blasts, people would link them to the Spanish intervention in the Iraq War and blame the PP for earning Spain enemies. Along these lines, a statement allegedly made in the meeting—and attributed by some accounts to Aznar's chief advisor, Pedro Arriola—claimed that "if it was ETA, we'll win [by a landslide]; if it was the Islamists, the PSOE shall win". (Note: The exact wording of the sentence varies depending on the source; a more informal variation states: "if it was ETA, we sweep the map; if it was the Islamists, we go home.")

== Opinion polls ==
Local regression trend line of poll results from 12 March 2000 to 14 March 2004, with each line corresponding to a political party.

== Voter turnout ==
The table below shows registered voter turnout during the election. Figures for election day do not include non-resident citizens, while final figures do.

Region	Time (Election day)									Final		
Region	14:00			18:00			20:00			Final		
Region	2000	2004	+/–	2000	2004	+/–	2000	2004	+/–	2000	2004	+/–
Andalusia	36.72%	40.99%	+4.27	56.12%	63.16%	+7.04	69.77%	75.96%	+6.19	68.77%	74.77%	+6.00
Aragon	38.45%	42.56%	+4.11	56.90%	62.78%	+5.88	72.25%	78.01%	+5.76	71.39%	77.04%	+5.65
Asturias	34.39%	38.50%	+4.11	55.25%	60.41%	+5.16	69.36%	74.40%	+5.04	66.99%	71.73%	+4.74
Balearic Islands	34.96%	40.86%	+5.90	49.86%	58.28%	+8.42	61.91%	69.45%	+7.54	61.43%	68.84%	+7.41
Basque Country	35.42%	42.17%	+6.75	50.98%	61.99%	+11.01	64.51%	75.94%	+11.43	63.84%	74.97%	+11.13
Canary Islands	26.00%	30.29%	+4.29	42.45%	50.44%	+7.99	61.63%	67.69%	+6.06	60.67%	66.70%	+6.03
Cantabria	35.24%	43.67%	+8.43	58.14%	66.27%	+8.13	73.34%	79.20%	+5.86	71.81%	77.23%	+5.42
Castile and León	38.95%	42.06%	+3.11	59.97%	65.43%	+5.46	74.37%	80.00%	+5.63	72.57%	77.81%	+5.24
Castilla–La Mancha	40.10%	42.99%	+2.89	61.86%	66.41%	+4.55	77.03%	80.65%	+3.62	76.31%	79.90%	+3.59
Catalonia	34.11%	42.21%	+8.10	49.71%	62.32%	+12.61	64.70%	76.96%	+12.26	64.01%	75.96%	+11.95
Extremadura	43.40%	45.45%	+2.05	62.54%	66.68%	+4.14	76.67%	80.87%	+4.20	75.42%	79.26%	+3.84
Galicia	31.86%	34.68%	+2.82	55.61%	61.48%	+5.87	69.49%	76.09%	+6.60	65.02%	70.97%	+5.95
La Rioja	42.65%	46.75%	+4.10	60.08%	66.24%	+6.16	75.44%	80.77%	+5.33	74.21%	79.46%	+5.25
Madrid	37.12%	38.84%	+1.72	57.63%	63.78%	+6.15	73.43%	80.74%	+7.31	72.08%	78.93%	+6.85
Murcia	40.40%	44.00%	+3.60	60.96%	66.36%	+5.40	74.49%	78.05%	+3.56	73.54%	77.06%	+3.52
Navarre	35.76%	41.24%	+5.48	52.74%	62.83%	+10.09	67.16%	77.59%	+10.43	66.07%	76.22%	+10.15
Valencian Community	41.70%	46.49%	+4.79	59.95%	66.46%	+6.51	73.39%	78.82%	+5.43	72.70%	77.71%	+5.01
Ceuta	28.48%	34.39%	+5.91	42.62%	51.47%	+8.85	56.20%	65.13%	+8.93	55.15%	63.45%	+8.30
Melilla	27.01%	29.56%	+2.55	42.34%	45.98%	+3.64	55.93%	58.56%	+2.63	54.00%	55.84%	+1.84
Total	36.50%	41.02%	+4.52	55.45%	63.02%	+7.57	70.00%	77.26%	+7.26	68.71%	75.66%	+6.95

== Results ==
=== Congress of Deputies ===
← Summary of the 14 March 2004 Congress of Deputies election results →
Parties and alliances	Popular vote			Seats	
Parties and alliances	Votes	%	±pp	Total	+/−
Spanish Socialist Workers' Party (PSOE)^{1}	11,026,163	42.59	+8.42	164	+39
People's Party (PP)	9,763,144	37.71	−6.81	148	−35
United Left (IU)^{2}	1,284,081	4.96	−0.93	5	−4
Convergence and Union (CiU)	835,471	3.23	−0.96	10	−5
Republican Left of Catalonia (ERC)	652,196	2.52	+1.68	8	+7
Basque Nationalist Party (EAJ/PNV)^{3}	420,980	1.63	+0.13	7	±0
Canarian Coalition (CC)	235,221	0.91	−0.16	3	−1
Galician Nationalist Bloc (BNG)	208,688	0.81	−0.51	2	−1
Andalusian Party (PA)	181,868	0.70	−0.19	0	−1
Aragonese Union (CHA)	94,252	0.36	+0.03	1	±0
Basque Solidarity (EA)^{3}	80,905	0.31	−0.06	1	±0
The Eco-pacifist Greens (LVEP)	68,027	0.26	+0.16	0	±0
The Eco-pacifist Greens (LVEP)	37,499	0.14	+0.04	0	±0
The Greens–The Ecologist Alternative (EV–AE)	30,528	0.12	New	0	±0
Navarre Yes (NaBai)^{4}	61,045	0.24	+0.15	1	+1
Valencian Nationalist Bloc–Green Left (Bloc–EV)	40,759	0.16	−0.09	0	±0
Progressives for the Balearic Islands (PSM–EN, EU, EV, ER)^{5}	40,289	0.16	−0.06	0	±0
Citizens for Blank Votes (CenB)	40,208	0.16	New	0	±0
Aralar–Stand up (Aralar–Zutik)	38,560	0.15	New	0	±0
Aragonese Party (PAR)	36,540	0.14	−0.03	0	±0
Democratic and Social Centre (CDS)	34,101	0.13	+0.03	0	±0
Socialist Party of Andalusia (PSA)	24,127	0.09	New	0	±0
Humanist Party (PH)	21,758	0.08	±0.00	0	±0
The Greens of the Community of Madrid (LVCM)	19,600	0.08	−0.01	0	±0
Republican Left (IR)	16,993	0.07	New	0	±0
Cannabis Party for Legalization and Normalization (PCLyN)	16,918	0.07	New	0	±0
Family and Life Party (PFyV)	16,699	0.06	New	0	±0
The Greens (Verdes)	15,220	0.06	±0.00	0	±0
The Greens of the Region of Murcia (LVRM)	7,074	0.03	±0.00	0	±0
The Greens of Asturias (Verdes)	5,013	0.02	±0.00	0	±0
The Greens of Extremadura (LV)	3,133	0.01	±0.00	0	±0
National Democracy (DN)	15,180	0.06	New	0	±0
Leonese People's Union (UPL)	14,160	0.05	−0.13	0	±0
Communist Party of the Peoples of Spain (PCPE)	12,979	0.05	−0.01	0	±0
The Greens–Green Group (LV–GV)	12,749	0.05	−0.04	0	±0
Spanish Phalanx of the CNSO (FE de las JONS)^{6}	12,266	0.05	+0.02	0	±0
Majorcan Union (UM)	10,558	0.04	±0.00	0	±0
The Phalanx (FE)	10,311	0.04	−0.02	0	±0
Commoners' Land–Castilian Nationalist Party (TC–PNC)	8,866	0.03	−0.05	0	±0
Internationalist Socialist Workers' Party (POSI)	8,003	0.03	−0.02	0	±0
Republican Social Movement (MSR)	6,768	0.03	New	0	±0
Spanish Democratic Party (PADE)	5,677	0.02	−0.02	0	±0
Convergence of Democrats of Navarre (CDN)	5,573	0.02	−0.02	0	±0
Authentic Phalanx (FA)	4,589	0.02	New	0	±0
Asturianist Party (PAS)	4,292	0.02	−0.01	0	±0
Spain 2000 (E–2000)	4,231	0.02	−0.02	0	±0
Canarian Nationalist Party (PNC)	4,092	0.02	New	0	±0
United Extremadura (EU)	3,916	0.02	±0.00	0	±0
Party of Self-employed and Professionals (AUTONOMO)	3,124	0.01	−0.01	0	±0
Initiative for the Development of Soria (IDES)	2,934	0.01	New	0	±0
Andalusia Assembly (A)	2,930	0.01	±0.00	0	±0
Canarian Popular Alternative (APCa)	2,715	0.01	New	0	±0
European Green Group (GVE)	2,662	0.01	New	0	±0
Independent Candidacy–The Party of Castile and León (CI–PCL)	2,421	0.01	−0.01	0	±0
Unsubmissive Seats–Alternative of Discontented Democrats (Ei–ADD)	2,332	0.01	New	0	±0
Party of the Democratic Karma (PKD)	2,300	0.01	±0.00	0	±0
Galician People's Front (FPG)	2,257	0.01	±0.00	0	±0
Galician Coalition (CG)	2,235	0.01	±0.00	0	±0
Alliance for Development and Nature (ADN)	2,215	0.01	New	0	±0
Party of Precarious Workers (PTPRE)	2,115	0.01	New	0	±0
Kingdom of Valencia Identity (IRV)	2,111	0.01	New	0	±0
Party of Self-employed, Retirees and Widows (PAE)	2,082	0.01	±0.00	0	±0
Andecha Astur (AA)	1,970	0.01	±0.00	0	±0
Union of the Salamancan People (UPSa)	1,871	0.01	New	0	±0
The Greens–Green Alternative (EV–AV)	1,836	0.01	−0.04	0	±0
Carlist Party (PC)	1,813	0.01	±0.00	0	±0
Romantic Mutual Support Party (PMAR)	1,561	0.01	New	0	±0
Cantabrian Nationalist Council (CNC)	1,431	0.01	±0.00	0	±0
Salamanca–Zamora–León–PREPAL (PREPAL)	1,322	0.01	±0.00	0	±0
Another Democracy is Possible (ODeP)	1,302	0.01	New	0	±0
Independent Social Group (ASI)	1,237	0.00	New	0	±0
Independent Social Democratic Party of the Valencian Community (PSICV)	1,096	0.00	New	0	±0
Republican Party (PRF)	1,051	0.00	New	0	±0
Alternative for Gran Canaria (AxGC)	957	0.00	New	0	±0
Alliance for National Unity (AUN)	923	0.00	New	0	±0
Left Assembly–Initiative for Andalusia (A–IZ)	901	0.00	New	0	±0
Christian Positivist Party (PPCr)	892	0.00	±0.00	0	±0
Asturian Left (IAS)	854	0.00	±0.00	0	±0
Socialist Party of the People of Ceuta (PSPC)	807	0.00	±0.00	0	±0
Liberal Centrist Union (UCL)	798	0.00	New	0	±0
Caló Nationalist Party (PNCA)	757	0.00	−0.01	0	±0
United Zamora (ZU)	754	0.00	New	0	±0
Union of Centrists of Menorca (UCM)	751	0.00	New	0	±0
Internationalist Struggle (LI (LIT–CI))	668	0.00	−0.01	0	±0
Spanish Democratic Front (FDE)	619	0.00	New	0	±0
Castilian Unity (UdCa)	601	0.00	New	0	±0
Andalusian Social Democratic Party (PSDA)	583	0.00	New	0	±0
Nationalist Maga Alternative (AMAGA)	468	0.00	New	0	±0
Balearic People's Union (UPB)	411	0.00	±0.00	0	±0
European Nation State (N)	410	0.00	±0.00	0	±0
Workers for Democracy Coalition (TD)	407	0.00	New	0	±0
National Workers' Party (PNT)	379	0.00	New	0	±0
Party of The People (LG)	378	0.00	New	0	±0
Regionalist Party of Guadalajara (PRGU)	330	0.00	±0.00	0	±0
National Union (UN)	318	0.00	±0.00	0	±0
Citizens' Convergence of the South-East (CCSE)	308	0.00	±0.00	0	±0
National Democratic Party of Spain (PDNE)	232	0.00	New	0	±0
Spanish Absolute Honesty Political Group (GPHAE)	52	0.00	New	0	±0
Blank ballots	407,795	1.58	±0.00		
Total	25,891,299			350	±0
Valid votes	25,891,299	98.99	−0.33		
Invalid votes	264,137	1.01	+0.33		
Votes cast / turnout	26,155,436	75.66	+6.95		
Abstentions	8,416,395	24.34	−6.95		
Registered voters	34,571,831				
Sources
Footnotes: ^{1} Spanish Socialist Workers' Party results are compared to the combined totals of Spanish Socialist Workers' Party–Progressives and Extremaduran Coalition in the 2000 election.; ^{2} United Left results are compared to the combined totals of United Left, Initiative for Catalonia–Greens and Independent Socialists of Extremadura in the 2000 election. It does not include results in the Balearic Islands.; ^{3} Basque Nationalist Party and Basque Solidarity do not include results in Navarre.; ^{4} Navarre Yes results are compared to the combined totals of Basque Solidarity and Basque Nationalist Party in Navarre in the 2000 election.; ^{5} Progressives for the Balearic Islands results are compared to the combined totals of Socialist Party of Mallorca–Nationalist Agreement, United Left of the Balearic Islands, The Greens of the Balearic Islands and Republican Left of Catalonia in the 2000 election, only in the Balearic Islands.; ^{6} Spanish Phalanx of the CNSO results are compared to Independent Spanish Phalanx–Phalanx 2000 totals in the 2000 election.

Popular vote
PSOE	42.59%
PP	37.71%
IU	4.96%
CiU	3.23%
ERC	2.52%
EAJ/PNV	1.63%
CC	0.91%
BNG	0.81%
CHA	0.36%
EA	0.31%
NaBai	0.24%
Others	3.17%
Blank ballots	1.58%

Seats
PSOE	46.86%
PP	42.29%
CiU	2.86%
ERC	2.29%
EAJ/PNV	2.00%
IU	1.43%
CC	0.89%
BNG	0.57%
CHA	0.29%
EA	0.29%
NaBai	0.29%

=== Senate ===
← Summary of the 14 March 2004 Senate of Spain election results →
Parties and alliances	Popular vote			Seats	
Parties and alliances	Votes	%	±pp	Total	+/−
People's Party (PP)	26,639,965	37.92	−7.43	102	−25
Spanish Socialist Workers' Party (PSOE)	25,666,070	36.53	+10.13	81	+28
Spanish Socialist Workers' Party (PSOE)^{1}	25,664,516	36.53	+10.13	81	+28
For our Land (PSOE–PNC)	1,554	0.00	New	0	±0
Catalan Agreement of Progress (PSC–ERC–ICV–EUiA)	6,087,158	8.66	+2.66	12	+4
United Left (IU)	2,857,366	4.07	−3.60	0	±0
Convergence and Union (CiU)	2,670,375	3.80	−0.73	4	−4
Basque Nationalist Party (EAJ/PNV)^{2}	1,219,623	1.74	+0.12	6	±0
Galician Nationalist Bloc (BNG)	750,251	1.07	−0.36	0	±0
Andalusian Party (PA)	487,558	0.69	−0.24	0	±0
Canarian Coalition (CC)	409,246	0.58	−0.13	3	−2
The Eco-pacifist Greens (LVEP)	267,017	0.38	+0.30	0	±0
The Greens–The Ecologist Alternative (EV–AE)	200,487	0.28	New	0	±0
The Eco-pacifist Greens (LVEP)	66,530	0.09	+0.01	0	±0
Basque Solidarity (EA)^{2}	227,665	0.32	−0.09	0	±0
Aragonese Union (CHA)	227,065	0.32	+0.02	0	±0
Navarre Yes (NaBai)^{3}	176,179	0.25	+0.21	0	±0
Valencian Nationalist Bloc–Green Left (Bloc–EV)	135,872	0.19	+0.06	0	±0
Aragonese Party (PAR)	124,777	0.18	−0.02	0	±0
Democratic and Social Centre (CDS)	92,564	0.13	+0.03	0	±0
Aralar–Stand up (Aralar–Zutik)	92,118	0.13	New	0	±0
Humanist Party (PH)	85,877	0.12	+0.01	0	±0
Progressives for the Balearic Islands (PSM–EN, EU, EV, ER)^{4}	74,842	0.11	−0.11	0	±0
Socialist Party of Andalusia (PSA)	73,843	0.11	New	0	±0
Join Action (AY)	67,356	0.10	New	0	±0
Burdened and Angry Citizens (CAyC)	66,213	0.09	New	0	±0
Anti-Bullfighting Party Against Mistreatment of Animals (PACMA)	64,987	0.09	New	0	±0
Cannabis Party for Legalization and Normalization (PCLyN)	57,312	0.08	New	0	±0
The Greens (Verdes)	56,672	0.08	−0.05	0	±0
The Greens of the Region of Murcia (LVRM)	24,257	0.03	−0.01	0	±0
The Greens of Asturias (Verdes)	17,899	0.03	±0.00	0	±0
The Greens of Extremadura (LV)	10,948	0.02	±0.00	0	±0
The Greens–Left Forum (LV–FI)	2,847	0.00	New	0	±0
The Greens of the Canaries (Verdes)	721	0.00	−0.03	0	±0
Internationalist Socialist Workers' Party (POSI)	56,300	0.08	±0.00	0	±0
Leonese People's Union (UPL)	55,587	0.08	−0.12	0	±0
Communist Party of the Peoples of Spain (PCPE)	49,495	0.07	−0.01	0	±0
Spanish Phalanx of the CNSO (FE de las JONS)^{5}	45,127	0.06	+0.02	0	±0
Commoners' Land–Castilian Nationalist Party (TC–PNC)	41,992	0.06	−0.05	0	±0
Family and Life Party (PFyV)	35,476	0.05	New	0	±0
Citizens for Blank Votes (CenB)	35,385	0.05	New	0	±0
Another Democracy is Possible (ODeP)	30,557	0.04	New	0	±0
The Greens of the Community of Madrid (LVCM)	28,788	0.04	−0.05	0	±0
Republican Left–Socialist Action Party (IR–PASOC)	27,973	0.04	+0.02	0	±0
Majorcan Union (UM)	27,050	0.04	±0.00	0	±0
Carlist Traditionalist Communion (CTC)	23,852	0.03	−0.02	0	±0
National Democracy (DN)	23,544	0.03	New	0	±0
Republican Left of the Valencian Country (ERPV)	22,688	0.03	+0.01	0	±0
The Greens–Green Group (LV–GV)	22,656	0.03	−0.04	0	±0
Authentic Phalanx (FA)	19,413	0.03	New	0	±0
United Extremadura (EU)	18,040	0.03	±0.00	0	±0
Convergence of Democrats of Navarre (CDN)	16,946	0.02	−0.02	0	±0
Spanish Democratic Party (PADE)	15,655	0.02	−0.01	0	±0
Asturianist Party (PAS)	14,345	0.02	−0.01	0	±0
Internationalist Struggle (LI (LIT–CI))	13,312	0.02	+0.01	0	±0
Spain 2000 (E–2000)	13,150	0.02	+0.01	0	±0
Galician People's Front (FPG)	13,149	0.02	+0.01	0	±0
Lanzarote Independents Party (PIL)	11,457	0.02	±0.00	0	−1
Initiative for the Development of Soria (IDES)	10,884	0.02	New	0	±0
Party of Self-employed and Professionals (AUTONOMO)	10,647	0.02	±0.00	0	±0
Carlist Party (PC)	10,487	0.01	±0.00	0	±0
Salamanca–Zamora–León–PREPAL (PREPAL)	10,434	0.01	±0.00	0	±0
Unsubmissive Seats–Alternative of Discontented Democrats (Ei–ADD)	9,040	0.01	New	0	±0
Party of Self-employed, Retirees and Widows (PAE)	8,673	0.01	+0.01	0	±0
Andalusia Assembly (A)	8,355	0.01	−0.01	0	±0
Canarian Nationalist Party (PNC)	8,047	0.01	New	0	±0
Alliance for Development and Nature (ADN)	7,807	0.01	−0.01	0	±0
Andecha Astur (AA)	7,665	0.01	±0.00	0	±0
The Phalanx (FE)	7,603	0.01	−0.05	0	±0
Party of The People (LG)	7,507	0.01	New	0	±0
The Greens–Green Alternative (EV–AV)	7,382	0.01	−0.07	0	±0
Independent Candidacy–The Party of Castile and León (CI–PCL)	7,362	0.01	−0.01	0	±0
Union of the Salamancan People (UPSa)	6,495	0.01	New	0	±0
Party of Precarious Workers (PTPRE)	6,171	0.01	New	0	±0
European Nation State (N)	5,982	0.01	+0.01	0	±0
Cantabrian Nationalist Council (CNC)	5,526	0.01	±0.00	0	±0
25 May Citizens' Alternative (AC25M)	5,360	0.01	New	0	±0
Party of the Democratic Karma (PKD)	5,099	0.01	±0.00	0	±0
Independent Social Democratic Party of the Valencian Community (PSICV)	5,078	0.01	New	0	±0
Canarian Popular Alternative (APCa)	4,853	0.01	New	0	±0
Asturian Left (IAS)	4,474	0.01	±0.00	0	±0
Socialist Party of Menorca–Nationalist Agreement (PSM–EN)	4,242	0.01	New	0	±0
Republican Party (PRF)	4,206	0.01	New	0	±0
Galician Coalition (CG)	4,173	0.01	±0.00	0	±0
Caló Nationalist Party (PNCA)	3,356	0.00	New	0	±0
Kingdom of Valencia Identity (IRV)	3,342	0.00	New	0	±0
Romantic Mutual Support Party (PMAR)	3,277	0.00	New	0	±0
Clean Hands Project (PML)	3,179	0.00	±0.00	0	±0
Left Assembly–Initiative for Andalusia (A–IZ)	3,052	0.00	New	0	±0
United Zamora (ZU)	2,992	0.00	New	0	±0
Party Association of Widows and Legal Wives (PAVIEL)	2,950	0.00	−0.01	0	±0
Progressives for Ibiza and Formentera (EU–ENE–ERC)	2,876	0.00	New	0	±0
Independent Social Group (ASI)	2,620	0.00	New	0	±0
Castilian Unity (UdCa)	2,463	0.00	New	0	±0
Alliance for National Unity (AUN)	2,338	0.00	New	0	±0
Liberal Centrist Union (UCL)	2,155	0.00	New	0	±0
New Force (FN)	2,096	0.00	±0.00	0	±0
Socialist Party of the People of Ceuta (PSPC)	1,904	0.00	±0.00	0	±0
Natural Culture (CN)	1,767	0.00	−0.01	0	±0
The Republic (La República)	1,686	0.00	New	0	±0
Alternative for Gran Canaria (AxGC)	1,672	0.00	New	0	±0
Party of El Bierzo (PB)	1,640	0.00	±0.00	0	±0
Immigrants with the Right to Equality and Obligations (INDIO)	1,587	0.00	±0.00	0	±0
Christian Positivist Party (PPCr)	1,297	0.00	±0.00	0	±0
Regionalist Party of Guadalajara (PRGU)	1,142	0.00	±0.00	0	±0
Workers for Democracy Coalition (TD)	1,074	0.00	New	0	±0
Union of Centrists of Menorca (UCM)	802	0.00	New	0	±0
European Green Group (GVE)	795	0.00	±0.00	0	±0
Initiative for La Palma (INPA)	722	0.00	New	0	±0
National Workers' Party (PNT)	508	0.00	New	0	±0
National Union (UN)	505	0.00	±0.00	0	±0
Citizens' Convergence of the South-East (CCSE)	366	0.00	±0.00	0	±0
New Spanish Republicans (NRUP)	220	0.00	New	0	±0
Cives (Cives)	199	0.00	±0.00	0	±0
Balearic People's Union (UPB)	98	0.00	±0.00	0	±0
Digital Citizens from Castelnou (CDC)	79	0.00	New	0	±0
Blank ballots (Note: The percentage of blank ballots is calculated over the official number of valid votes cast, irrespective of the total number of votes shown as a result of adding up the individual results for each party.)	679,816	2.67	−0.15		
Total	70,258,035			208	±0
Valid votes	25,426,107	97.09	−0.42		
Invalid votes	761,055	2.91	+0.42		
Votes cast / turnout	26,187,162	75.75	+6.92		
Abstentions	8,384,669	24.25	−6.92		
Registered voters	34,571,831				
Sources
Footnotes: ^{1} Spanish Socialist Workers' Party results are compared to the combined totals of Spanish Socialist Workers' Party and Progressive Pact in the 2000 election.; ^{2} Basque Nationalist Party and Basque Solidarity do not include results in Navarre.; ^{3} Navarre Yes results are compared to the combined totals of Basque Solidarity and Basque Nationalist Party in Navarre in the 2000 election.; ^{4} Progressives for the Balearic Islands results are compared to the combined totals of Socialist Party of Mallorca–Nationalist Agreement, United Left of the Balearic Islands, The Greens of the Balearic Islands and Republican Left of Catalonia in the 2000 election, only in the Balearic Islands.; ^{5} Spanish Phalanx of the CNSO results are compared to Independent Spanish Phalanx–Phalanx 2000 totals in the 2000 election.

Popular vote
PP	37.92%
PSOE	36.53%
ECdP	8.66%
IU	4.07%
CiU	3.80%
EAJ/PNV	1.74%
BNG	1.07%
CC	0.58%
Others	4.67%
Blank ballots	2.67%

Seats
PP	49.04%
PSOE	38.94%
ECdP	5.77%
EAJ/PNV	2.88%
CiU	1.92%
CC	1.44%

=== Maps ===
Election results by constituency (Congress).

Vote winner strength by constituency (Congress).

Vote winner strength by autonomous community (Congress).

== Aftermath ==
=== Government formation ===
Immediately following the election, Zapatero announced that he would form a PSOE minority government supported by ad-hoc parliamentary agreements, with both ERC and IU showing their willingness to support his investiture under this scheme, but under a series of conditions: IU demanded the immediate withdrawal of Spanish troops from Iraq and the repealing of the Ebro water transfer, whereas ERC also required the reform of the Catalan Statute and "dialogue and respect for the plurality of cultures" within Spain. CiU rejected casting a negative vote, but conditioned a support vote on reaching agreements on issues such as the approval of the new Catalan Statute, a new system of regional financing, or more public investments in Catalonia; they would later confirm on 13 April their upcoming abstention in the investiture vote, owing to their "bad experience" in past confidence and supply arrangements, and disagreements with the PSOE over the 2000 Anti-Terrorist Pact with the PP (the latter being a similar reasoning justifying PNV's abstention).

During the round of consultations held by King Juan Carlos I on 5 and 6 April, EA and NaBai announced their abstention to Zapatero's election while praising the latter's willingness to engage in dialogue, while CHA announced its support over the PSOE's commitment to repeal the Ebro water transfer. Both IU and ERC showed a "favourable attitude" towards Zapatero, which prompted the King to formally nominate him for investiture on 7 April. Subsequent negotiations ensured ERC's support in the first round of balloting on 16 April, while CC and BNG announced theirs during the investiture debate.

Investiture; Congress of Deputies; Nomination of José Luis Rodríguez Zapatero (PSOE)
Ballot →	16 April 2004
Required majority →	176 out of 350
Yes: • PSOE (164); • ERC (8); • IU–ICV (5); • CC (3); • BNG (2); • CHA (1)	183 / 350
No: • PP (148)	148 / 350
Abstentions: • CiU (10); • PNV (7); • EA (1); • NaBai (1)	19 / 350
Absentees	0 / 350

== Bibliography ==
Legislation

- Constitución Española (Constitution). Official State Gazette (in Spanish). 27 December 1978 [version as of 28 August 1992]. BOE-A-1978-31229.
- Ley Orgánica 5/1985, de 19 de junio, del Régimen Electoral General (Organic Law 5/1985). Official State Gazette (in Spanish). 19 June 1985 [version as of 29 November 2003]. BOE-A-1985-11672.
- Real Decreto 100/2004, de 19 de enero, de disolución del Congreso de los Diputados y del Senado y de convocatoria de elecciones (Royal Decree 100/2004). Official State Gazette (in Spanish). 19 January 2004. BOE-A-2004-1063.

Other

- Carreras de Odriozola, Albert; Tafunell Sambola, Xavier (2005) [1989]. Estadísticas históricas de España, siglos XIX-XX (PDF) (in Spanish). Vol. 1 (II ed.). Bilbao: Fundación BBVA. pp. 1072–1097. ISBN 84-96515-00-1. Archived from the original (PDF) on 24 September 2015.
- Chari, Raj (November 2004). "The 2004 Spanish Election: Terrorism as a Catalyst for Change?". West European Politics. 27 (5): 954–963. doi:10.1080/0140238042000283247. S2CID 154342689.
- Whitfield, Teresa (December 2015). Special Report 384. The Basque Conflict and ETA. The Difficulties of an Ending (PDF) (Report). United States Institute of Peace.
- Sangrador-Vegas, Begoña (2020). "People's Party (1996-2004): Economic Boom, Immigration and 11-M". The Nation in Its Labyrinth: An Introduction to Contemporary Spain since 1898 (in Spanish). Madrid: Pressbooks.
