= Madrid bombings =

Madrid bombings may refer to:

- Cafetería Rolando bombing, 1974
- May 1979 Madrid bombing
- July 1979 Madrid bombings
- El Descanso bombing, April 1985
- Madrid airline office attacks, July 1985
- Plaza República Dominicana bombing, 1986
- 1992 Madrid bombing
- 1993 Madrid bombings
- 1995 Vallecas bombing
- 2000 Madrid bombing
- 2001 Madrid bombing
- 2004 Madrid train bombings
- 2006 Madrid-Barajas Airport bombing
