= National Workers' Party (Spain) =

National Workers' Party Partido Nacional de los Trabajadores
- Leader: Miguel Murcia
- Founded: 1999
- Ideology: Spanish nationalism Neo-fascism; Opposition to immigration
- Political position: Far-right
- Colors: red

Website
- www.libreopinion.com/members/pnte

National Workers' Party (in Spanish: Partido Nacional de los Trabajadores) is a small far-right political party in Spain. In the 2004 parliamentary elections, PNT got 379 votes.

The PNT defended the hardening of the penalties for offenders, death penalty for terrorists, opposed immigration, supported the unity of Spain, and opposed same-sex marriage.

In March 2000, PNT joined the coalition España 2000.
