= Opinion polling for the 2004 Spanish general election =

In the run up to the 2004 Spanish general election, various organisations carried out opinion polling to gauge voting intention in Spain during the term of the 7th Cortes Generales. Results of such polls are displayed in this article. The date range for these opinion polls is from the previous general election, held on 12 March 2000, to the day the next election was held, on 14 March 2004.

Voting intention estimates refer mainly to a hypothetical Congress of Deputies election. Polls are listed in reverse chronological order, showing the most recent first and using the dates when the survey fieldwork was done, as opposed to the date of publication. Where the fieldwork dates are unknown, the date of publication is given instead. The highest percentage figure in each polling survey is displayed with its background shaded in the leading party's colour. If a tie ensues, this is applied to the figures with the highest percentages. The "Lead" columns on the right shows the percentage-point difference between the parties with the highest percentages in a poll.

== Electoral polling ==
=== Nationwide polling ===
==== Graphical summary ====
Local regression trend line of poll results from 12 March 2000 to 14 March 2004, with each line corresponding to a political party.

==== Voting intention estimates ====
The table below lists nationwide voting intention estimates. Refusals are generally excluded from the party vote percentages, while question wording and the treatment of "don't know" responses and those not intending to vote may vary between polling organisations. When available, seat projections determined by the polling organisations are displayed below (or in place of) the percentages in a smaller font; 176 seats were required for an absolute majority in the Congress of Deputies.

Color key:

Poll conducted after legal ban on opinion polls Exit poll

Polling firm/Commissioner	Fieldwork date	Sample size	Turnout	PP	PSOE	IU	CiU	PNV	BNG	CC	ERC	Lead
2004 general election	14 Mar 2004	—N/a	75.7	37.7; 148	42.6; 164	5.0; 5	3.2; 10	1.6; 7	0.8; 2	0.9; 3	2.5; 8	4.9
Sigma Dos/Antena 3 (Note: Quick count.)	14 Mar 2004	?	?	37.5	42.7	5.3	3.1	1.7	–	–	–	5.2
Sigma Dos/Antena 3	14 Mar 2004	75,000	?	38.5; 153/161	41.0; 152/159	5.4; 6/7	3.3; 10/11	1.6; 7	1.0; 3	0.9; 3	2.3; 6	2.5
Ipsos–Eco/RTVE–FORTA	14 Mar 2004	210,000	?	36.9; 150/154	41.4; 154/158	6.3; 9/11	3.0; 10/12	1.4; 6/7	0.9; 2	0.9; 3/4	2.3; 7/8	4.5
TNS Demoscopia/Tele 5	11–13 Mar 2004	?	?	40.6; 168/170	38.3; 140/143	6.5; 8/10	3.0; 10/11	1.5; 7	? 2	0.9; 3	2.7; 6/7	2.3
Opina/Cadena SER	12 Mar 2004	?	?	39.5; 154/160	40.5; 151/159	6.1; 9/10	3.0; 10/11	1.2; 7/8	? 2/3	? 3/4	? 5/6	1.0
Sigma Dos	12 Mar 2004	?	?	40.3	39.6	5.2	3.3	1.8	–	–	–	0.7
Sigma Dos	10 Mar 2004	?	?	41.2	38.4	5.3	3.3	1.8	–	–	–	2.8
TNS Demoscopia/Tele 5	8 Mar 2004	3,031	?	42.5; 174/176	37.8; 136/137	–	–	–	–	–	–	4.7
Opina/Cadena SER	7 Mar 2004	?	?	40.5; 161/166	38.0; 140/145	5.8; 11/12	3.6; 10/11	1.4; 7/8	1.1; 3	0.8; 4	2.0; 7/8	2.5
Opina/Cadena SER	6 Mar 2004	?	?	40.5	37.0	5.8	3.8	1.5	–	–	–	3.5
Sigma Dos/El Mundo	5–6 Mar 2004	1,000	?	42.1; 168/173	37.6; 138/144	5.3; 6/8	3.4; 11	1.8; 7	1.2; 3	1.0; 3/4	2.0; 5/6	4.5
Celeste-Tel/La Razón	4–6 Mar 2004	601	74.1	42.9; 173/177	37.6; 136/141	6.6; 9/10	3.4; 11/12	1.7; 7/8	1.1; 2	0.9; 3	1.6; 5/6	5.3
Opina/Cadena SER	5 Mar 2004	?	?	41.0	37.0	6.0	4.0	1.5	–	–	–	4.0
Celeste-Tel/La Razón	17 Feb–5 Mar 2004	2,404	72.1	42.9; 171/176	37.2; 135/141	5.9; 8	3.5; 11/12	1.7; 7/8	–	0.9; 3	1.5; 5/6	5.7
Opina/Cadena SER	4 Mar 2004	?	?	41.5	36.5	7.0	3.5	1.5	–	–	–	5.0
TNS Demoscopia/Tele 5	3 Mar 2004	?	?	42.1; 175/176	37.0; 136	–	–	–	–	–	–	5.1
Opina/Cadena SER	3 Mar 2004	?	?	41.5; 163/171	36.5; 135/143	6.5; 11/12	3.0; 10/11	1.6; 7/8	1.1; 2/3	0.8; 3/4	2.0; 6/8	5.0
Vox Pública/El Periódico	1–3 Mar 2004	2,071	72–73	42.5; 169/173	37.3; 135/140	7.1; 10/12	3.2; 10/11	1.5; 7	–	–	1.9; 6/7	5.2
Citigate Sanchís/La Gaceta	1–3 Mar 2004	1,007	?	42.8	37.3	5.7	3.1	1.5	–	1.4	2.2	5.5
Noxa/La Vanguardia	27 Feb–3 Mar 2004	2,200	?	41.4; 162/167	39.2; 143/147	6.3; 9/10	3.0; 10	2.1; 7	? 2/3	1.0; 4	2.1; 5/6	2.2
Opina/Cadena SER	2 Mar 2004	?	?	41.0	36.5	6.5	3.2	1.7	–	–	–	4.5
Sigma Dos/El Mundo	24 Feb–2 Mar 2004	12,500	?	42.8; 172/177	36.6; 134/139	5.7; 7/10	3.3; 11	1.8; 7	1.2; 3	–	1.9; 5	6.2
Opina/Cadena SER	1 Mar 2004	?	?	40.5	36.5	6.5	3.2	1.7	–	–	–	4.0
Opina/El País	27 Feb–1 Mar 2004	4,000	?	42.0; 168/172	38.0; 134/141	6.3; 11	3.0; 10/11	1.7; 7/8	0.9; 3	0.9; 3/4	1.9; 7	4.0
Opina/Cadena SER	29 Feb 2004	?	?	40.5; 164/169	36.5; 138/144	7.0; 12	3.5; 10/11	1.5; 7/8	1.0; 2/3	1.0; 3/4	1.5; 6	4.0
Ipsos–Eco/Prensa Ibérica	29 Feb 2004	?	?	41.3; 170/174	37.4; 131/135	6.5 ?	3.4 ?	1.4 ?	–	–	–	3.9
Citigate Sanchís/La Gaceta	29 Feb 2004	?	?	44.4	36.8	5.6	3.2	2.1	–	–	–	7.6
Opina/Cadena SER	28 Feb 2004	?	?	41.0	36.5	6.5	3.8	1.6	–	–	–	4.5
Opina/Cadena SER	27 Feb 2004	?	?	41.5; 166/172	36.5; 136/144	6.4; 10/12	3.8; 10/12	1.6; 6/8	–	–	–	5.0
Atento STC/Expansión	23–27 Feb 2004	?	?	40.4	37.5	5.0	–	–	–	–	–	2.9
Opina/Cadena SER	26 Feb 2004	3,000	?	41.5; 166/172	36.5; 136/144	6.0; 10/12	4.0; 10/12	1.5; 6/8	–	–	–	5.0
Infortécnica	26 Feb 2004	4,656	?	? 165/175	? 130/138	? 13/17	? 9/12	? 7/8	? 2/4	? 4/6	? 4/6	?
Sigma Dos/Antena 3	25 Feb 2004	?	?	43.3	35.8	5.8	3.6	1.4	–	–	–	7.5
Celeste-Tel/La Razón	17–25 Feb 2004	?	?	42.2; 170/171	36.1; 141/142	5.4; 6/7	3.9; 11/13	1.8; 8	? 3	? 4	? 2/3	6.1
TNS Demoscopia/Vocento	10–25 Feb 2004	12,760	68–70	42.2; 174/177	37.2; 133/137	7.0; 8/10	3.1; 10/11	1.5; 7	1.0; 2	0.9; 3	2.1; 6/7	5.0
Gallup	2–20 Feb 2004	2,036	69.1	43.9	35.1	6.1	3.2	1.5	–	–	–	8.8
Metra Seis/Colpisa	6–16 Feb 2004	5,200	70–72	42.0; 170/176	36.2; 131/136	5.8; 7/9	3.4; 11/12	1.9; 7/9	1.2; 2/3	0.9; 4/5	2.1; 5/7	5.8
CIS	24 Jan–15 Feb 2004	24,109	75.1	42.2; 176	35.5; 131	6.6; 10	3.7; 12	1.8; 7	1.2; 3	1.0; 3	1.9; 6	6.7
Noxa/La Vanguardia	6–12 Feb 2004	1,800	?	42.6; 164/169	38.6; 138/142	5.8; 9/10	2.8; 9	2.2; 8/9	? 4/5	0.9; 4	2.0; 6/7	4.0
Opina/Cadena SER	11 Feb 2004	1,000	?	41.0	38.0	5.0	5.0	2.0	–	–	–	3.0
Sigma Dos/Antena 3	9–10 Feb 2004	1,000	?	43.5	35.4	5.2	3.8	1.6	–	–	–	8.1
Celeste-Tel/La Razón	8 Feb 2004	?	?	43.9; 175	35.8; 136/137	5.4; 5/6	3.9; 12/13	1.8; 8	–	? 4	? 3	8.1
Sigma Dos/El Mundo	8 Feb 2004	?	?	44.3	34.8	5.6	3.6	1.5	–	–	–	9.5
Opina/Cadena SER	31 Jan 2004	1,000	?	41.0	37.0	4.0	4.0	2.0	–	–	–	4.0
Opina/El País	25 Jan 2004	3,000	?	42.5; 171/175	37.0; 135/138	5.5; 8/11	3.5; 12	1.5; 7	1.0; 2	1.3; 5	1.5; 4	5.5
Gallup	5–22 Jan 2004	2,028	68.3	41.9	36.2	6.7	4.3	1.7	–	–	–	5.7
Vox Pública/El Periódico	19–21 Jan 2004	1,501	?	43.0; 170/175	38.0; 138/142	5.5; 8/10	3.0; 10/11	1.5; 7	–	–	–	5.0
Opina/Cadena SER	16 Jan 2004	1,000	?	42.0	38.0	4.5	3.5	1.5	–	–	–	4.0
Noxa/La Vanguardia	7–9 Jan 2004	1,000	?	42.6; 174	36.5; 137	7.2; 11	3.0; 10	2.1; 9	–	1.0; 4	1.4; 3	6.1
Sigma Dos/El Mundo	4 Jan 2004	?	?	44.6	33.9	6.2	3.8	1.3	–	–	–	10.7
Opina/Cadena SER	2 Jan 2004	?	?	42.0	40.0	6.0	3.5	2.0	–	–	–	2.0
Gallup	1–19 Dec 2003	2,025	70.0	44.1	35.2	6.1	3.6	1.6	–	–	–	8.9
Celeste-Tel/La Razón	7 Dec 2003	?	?	43.0	35.5	5.9	3.6	2.0	–	–	–	7.5
Sigma Dos/El Mundo	7 Dec 2003	?	?	44.8	33.7	6.1	3.9	1.5	–	–	–	11.1
Opina/El País	7 Dec 2003	1,000	?	42.0	39.0	5.5	4.0	2.0	–	–	–	3.0
Metra Seis/Colpisa	2–5 Dec 2003	?	?	44.5; 178/185	33.1; 121/125	6.3; 8/9	4.1; 14/15	1.4; 7	–	–	–	11.4
Gallup	4–25 Nov 2003	2,032	70.5	43.3	36.5	6.7	3.5	1.6	–	–	–	6.8
Opina/Cadena SER	19 Nov 2003	1,000	?	42.0	39.0	5.0	4.0	2.0	–	–	–	3.0
CIS	25–31 Oct 2003	2,488	?	42.4	34.7	5.9	4.0	1.4	1.3	–	–	7.7
Gallup	3–22 Oct 2003	2,016	69.9	42.4	36.8	6.2	3.4	1.6	–	–	–	5.6
Intercampo/GETS	17 Sep–2 Oct 2003	1,714	?	43.8	34.3	6.4	3.8	1.5	–	–	–	9.5
Sigma Dos/El Mundo	28 Sep 2003	?	?	43.8	35.3	5.1	4.0	1.4	–	–	–	8.5
Opina/Cadena SER	24 Sep 2003	1,000	?	42.0	39.0	6.5	4.0	2.0	–	–	–	3.0
Vox Pública/El Periódico	22–24 Sep 2003	1,502	?	44.2	37.1	6.0	3.0	1.6	–	–	–	7.1
Gallup	1–24 Sep 2003	2,027	71.2	43.0	35.3	7.2	3.5	1.6	–	–	–	7.7
Opina/Cadena SER	10 Sep 2003	1,000	?	42.0	39.0	5.0	4.0	2.0	–	–	–	3.0
Opina/El País	7 Sep 2003	1,000	?	42.0	38.0	6.5	5.5	1.8	–	–	–	4.0
Celeste-Tel/La Razón	7 Sep 2003	?	?	43.2	35.3	5.9	3.7	1.9	–	–	–	7.9
Opina/Cadena SER	2 Sep 2003	1,000	?	42.0	39.0	6.0	5.0	2.0	–	–	–	3.0
Opina/Cadena SER	27 Aug 2003	1,000	?	42.0	39.0	6.5	5.5	2.0	–	–	–	3.0
Gallup	1–18 Aug 2003	2,026	70.2	43.6	36.5	5.4	3.7	1.5	–	–	–	7.1
Gallup	1–24 Jul 2003	2,032	70.7	42.9	37.4	5.9	3.4	1.4	–	–	–	5.5
Sigma Dos/El Mundo	20 Jul 2003	?	?	42.8	35.9	5.6	3.9	1.5	–	–	–	6.9
CIS	2–8 Jul 2003	2,476	?	41.2	35.2	6.3	3.8	1.2	1.5	–	–	6.0
Ibecom/La Razón	6 Jul 2003	?	?	43.6	33.9	4.4	4.3	1.3	–	–	–	9.7
Opina/Cadena SER	1 Jul 2003	1,000	?	40.0	39.0	5.0	5.0	2.0	–	–	–	1.0
Sigma Dos/El Mundo	24–26 Jun 2003	1,000	?	42.6	35.4	6.2	4.0	1.6	–	–	–	7.2
Vox Pública/El Periódico	23–25 Jun 2003	1,502	?	41.6	37.5	5.9	3.1	1.2	–	–	–	4.1
Gallup	2–20 Jun 2003	2,024	75.1	40.7	37.2	7.4	3.2	1.2	–	–	–	3.5
Opina/Cadena SER	11 Jun 2003	?	?	42.0	39.0	4.5	4.5	2.0	–	–	–	3.0
Opina/Cadena SER	28 May 2003	?	?	41.0	41.0	5.0	4.0	2.0	–	–	–	Tie
Gallup	5–26 May 2003	2,026	73.4	38.4	38.8	6.8	2.9	1.4	–	–	–	0.4
2003 local elections	25 May 2003	—N/a	67.8	34.3	34.8	6.1	3.4	1.8	1.4	1.2	1.8	0.5
Opina/Cadena SER	15 May 2003	1,000	?	39.0	39.0	6.0	4.0	1.8	–	–	–	Tie
CIS	24–30 Apr 2003	2,494	74.2	37.3	39.5	6.3	3.3	1.3	1.3	–	–	2.2
Sigma Dos/El Mundo	27 Apr 2003	?	?	41.2	38.7	5.0	3.7	1.5	–	–	–	2.5
Noxa/La Vanguardia	22–24 Apr 2003	1,000	?	39.3	42.3	6.1	3.2	1.5	–	–	–	3.0
Ipsos–Eco/ABC	22–24 Apr 2003	2,254	?	33.9	39.4	6.1	3.8	1.7	–	–	–	5.5
Opina/Cadena SER	23 Apr 2003	1,000	?	38.0	42.0	6.0	4.5	2.0	–	–	–	4.0
Gallup	1–22 Apr 2003	2,020	70.2	35.8	43.2	6.3	3.5	1.6	–	–	–	7.4
Opina/Cadena SER	2 Apr 2003	?	?	36.5	43.0	6.0	4.2	2.0	–	–	–	6.5
Vox Pública/El Periódico	31 Mar–2 Apr 2003	1,503	?	35.9	42.6	6.1	3.6	1.5	–	–	–	6.7
Sigma Dos/El Mundo	30 Mar 2003	?	?	38.6	40.7	5.1	3.6	1.5	–	–	–	2.1
Opina/El País	25–26 Mar 2003	1,000	?	36.0	42.0	6.2	4.2	2.0	–	–	–	6.0
Gallup	3–25 Mar 2003	2,016	68.8	38.6	42.1	5.1	3.8	1.6	–	–	–	3.5
Opina/Cadena SER	21 Mar 2003	1,000	?	37.0	43.0	6.0	4.0	1.8	–	–	–	6.0
Opina/Cadena SER	8 Mar 2003	1,000	?	37.0	42.5	5.0	4.0	1.5	–	–	–	5.5
Gallup	3–24 Feb 2003	2,028	68.5	39.7	39.8	5.5	3.7	1.6	–	–	–	0.1
Sigma Dos/El Mundo	18–20 Feb 2003	1,000	?	38.5	40.2	5.6	3.9	1.5	–	–	–	1.7
Opina/Cadena SER	19 Feb 2003	1,000	?	38.0	42.0	5.5	4.0	1.8	–	–	–	4.0
Opina/Cadena SER	6 Feb 2003	?	?	38.0	42.0	5.0	4.0	1.8	–	–	–	4.0
Opina/El País	3 Feb 2003	1,000	?	40.0	42.0	4.0	4.0	1.5	–	–	–	2.0
CIS	21–26 Jan 2003	2,480	74.4	39.8	37.3	5.5	3.7	1.5	1.4	–	–	2.5
Gallup	7–23 Jan 2003	2,034	68.9	39.6	39.5	4.9	3.3	1.6	–	–	–	0.1
Opina/Cadena SER	22 Jan 2003	1,000	?	41.0	41.0	5.0	4.0	1.6	–	–	–	Tie
Sigma Dos/El Mundo	20 Jan 2003	?	?	41.6	38.6	4.9	3.9	1.3	–	–	–	3.0
Vox Pública/El Periódico	13–16 Jan 2003	1,501	?	40.4	39.0	6.0	3.3	1.1	–	–	–	1.4
Opina/Cadena SER	8 Jan 2003	1,000	?	41.0	41.0	4.8	4.5	1.8	–	–	–	Tie
Gallup	2–23 Dec 2002	2,011	68.5	38.2	40.8	5.0	4.0	1.4	–	–	–	2.6
Opina/Cadena SER	17 Dec 2002	1,000	?	39.0	42.0	5.0	4.0	1.5	–	–	–	3.0
Sigma Dos/El Mundo	9–11 Dec 2002	1,000	?	41.7	38.8	4.7	3.7	1.4	–	–	–	2.9
Opina/Cadena SER	4 Dec 2002	1,000	?	41.0	41.0	5.0	4.0	1.5	–	–	–	Tie
La Vanguardia	25 Nov 2002	?	?	38.6; 153	40.0; 154	? 7	? 14	–	–	–	–	1.4
Gallup	4–25 Nov 2002	2,018	70.0	40.6	39.8	5.4	3.3	1.2	–	–	–	0.8
Opina/El País	23–24 Nov 2002	1,000	?	40.0	40.0	5.0	4.5	1.8	–	–	–	Tie
Opina/Cadena SER	20 Nov 2002	1,000	?	42.0	40.0	5.0	4.8	1.5	–	–	–	2.0
Sigma Dos/El Mundo	5–8 Nov 2002	3,400	?	41.9	38.4	4.6	4.0	1.4	–	–	–	3.5
Opina/Cadena SER	6 Nov 2002	1,000	?	41.0	41.0	5.0	4.0	1.8	–	–	–	Tie
Opina/El País	28–29 Oct 2002	?	?	41.0	41.0	5.2	4.0	1.7	–	–	–	Tie
Gallup	1–24 Oct 2002	2,018	69.4	42.7	37.2	5.1	3.8	1.4	–	–	–	5.5
Opina/Cadena SER	23 Oct 2002	1,000	?	41.0	39.5	5.1	4.0	1.5	–	–	–	1.5
Ibecom/La Razón	17–21 Oct 2002	?	?	43.5	38.7	2.9	3.1	1.1	–	–	–	4.8
CIS	16–21 Oct 2002	2,489	74.6	41.5	37.3	4.6	3.7	1.4	1.2	–	–	4.2
Sigma Dos/El Mundo	14 Oct 2002	?	?	41.8	37.9	5.0	4.2	1.5	–	–	–	3.9
Opina/Cadena SER	9 Oct 2002	1,000	?	42.0	38.5	5.0	4.0	2.0	–	–	–	3.5
Vox Pública/El Periódico	7–9 Oct 2002	1,507	?	42.4; 165/170	38.7; 145/150	4.8 ?	3.3 ?	1.2 ?	–	–	–	3.7
CIS	9 Sep–9 Oct 2002	10,476	75.6	41.0	37.1	5.4	4.0	1.5	1.2	–	–	3.9
Intercampo/GETS	18 Sep–3 Oct 2002	?	?	41.6	36.6	5.6	4.4	1.5	–	–	–	5.0
Opina/El País	29 Sep 2002	?	?	42.0	39.0	4.5	3.8	1.6	0.9	0.9	1.0	3.0
Opina/Cadena SER	25 Sep 2002	1,000	?	41.0	39.0	5.0	4.0	2.0	–	–	–	2.0
Ipsos–Eco/ABC	6–13 Sep 2002	2,010	?	40.7	37.6	5.7	4.0	1.5	1.4	–	–	3.1
Opina/Cadena SER	10 Sep 2002	1,000	?	42.0	39.5	5.0	4.0	1.7	–	–	–	2.5
Opina/Cadena SER	27 Aug 2002	1,000	?	41.0	41.0	5.5	4.0	1.8	–	–	–	Tie
Gallup	1–23 Aug 2002	2,008	68.0	42.1	38.0	5.5	3.1	1.4	–	–	–	4.1
Gallup	2–29 Jul 2002	2,013	67.8	42.5	38.0	5.7	3.4	1.4	–	–	–	4.5
CIS	16–21 Jul 2002	2,482	74.0	41.0	36.3	5.0	4.2	1.4	1.2	–	–	4.7
Sigma Dos/El Mundo	14 Jul 2002	?	?	43.3	36.2	5.7	3.9	1.5	–	–	–	7.1
La Vanguardia	26–30 Jun 2002	2,494	?	39.2; 158	36.8; 145	6.3; 9	3.5; 13	–	–	–	–	2.4
Opina/Cadena SER	27 Jun 2002	1,000	?	41.0	40.0	5.0	4.0	2.0	–	–	–	1.0
Vox Pública/El Periódico	24–26 Jun 2002	1,504	?	41.9	38.7	5.9	3.1	1.1	–	–	–	3.2
Gallup	1–24 Jun 2002	2,016	68.3	42.7	36.8	5.7	4.2	1.6	–	–	–	5.9
Opina/Cadena SER	21 Jun 2002	?	?	41.0	39.5	5.0	4.5	2.0	–	–	–	1.5
Opina/Cadena SER	5 Jun 2002	1,000	?	41.0	39.0	5.0	4.5	2.5	–	–	–	2.0
La Vanguardia	20–26 May 2002	2,496	?	40.0; 162	36.9; 142	6.6; 8	4.1; 15	–	–	–	–	3.1
Opina/Cadena SER	22 May 2002	1,000	?	41.0	40.0	5.0	4.5	2.0	–	–	–	1.0
Gallup	3–22 May 2002	2,010	70.2	42.3	37.6	5.3	3.6	1.5	–	–	–	4.7
Opina/Cadena SER	8 May 2002	1,000	?	41.0	39.0	5.0	4.5	2.0	–	–	–	2.0
Sigma Dos/El Mundo	3 May 2002	?	?	43.2	37.2	4.7	3.5	1.5	–	–	–	6.0
Opina/Cadena SER	24 Apr 2002	1,000	?	42.0	39.0	5.0	4.5	2.0	–	–	–	3.0
Gallup	1–23 Apr 2002	2,017	68.2	41.8	37.6	5.0	4.2	1.7	–	–	–	4.2
CIS	16–21 Apr 2002	2,498	73.9	42.4	34.4	5.4	4.4	1.5	1.5	–	–	8.0
Vox Pública/El Periódico	15–17 Apr 2002	1,510	?	42.5	37.6	5.2	3.9	1.4	–	–	–	4.9
Opina/Cadena SER	10 Apr 2002	1,000	?	42.0	38.5	5.0	4.5	2.0	–	–	–	3.5
Gallup	4–27 Mar 2002	2,029	68.3	41.8	36.9	5.8	3.7	1.7	–	–	–	4.9
Opina/Cadena SER	26 Mar 2002	1,000	?	42.0	38.0	5.0	5.0	2.0	–	–	–	4.0
Opina/Cadena SER	12 Mar 2002	1,000	?	42.0	39.0	5.0	4.5	2.0	–	–	–	3.0
Opina/Cadena SER	27 Feb 2002	1,000	?	43.5	38.0	5.0	4.5	1.7	–	–	–	5.5
Gallup	4–27 Feb 2002	2,030	70.3	43.1	37.1	5.0	3.4	1.4	–	–	–	6.0
Opina/Cadena SER	13 Feb 2002	1,000	?	42.5	38.0	5.0	5.0	1.7	–	–	–	4.5
Vox Pública/El Periódico	4–5 Feb 2002	1,506	?	44.1	36.8	4.9	3.4	1.7	–	–	–	7.3
CIS	27–31 Jan 2002	2,498	74.3	43.9	34.2	5.8	4.0	1.5	1.2	–	–	9.7
Opina/Cadena SER	30 Jan 2002	1,000	?	43.5	38.0	4.5	4.5	2.0	–	–	–	5.5
Gallup	4–29 Jan 2002	2,031	70.1	43.2	36.8	5.4	3.5	1.6	–	–	–	6.4
Opina/Cadena SER	16 Jan 2002	1,000	?	43.5	38.0	5.0	5.0	2.0	–	–	–	5.5
Opina/Cadena SER	3 Jan 2002	1,000	?	43.5	38.5	5.0	4.5	2.0	–	–	–	5.0
Sigma Dos/El Mundo	26–28 Dec 2001	?	?	44.7	35.5	4.4	3.6	1.5	–	–	–	9.2
Gallup	3–28 Dec 2001	2,020	70.6	42.2	38.4	5.2	3.4	1.5	–	–	–	3.8
Opina/Cadena SER	24 Dec 2001	?	?	42.0	37.0	5.5	4.0	2.0	1.4	–	–	5.0
Opina/Cadena SER	5 Dec 2001	1,000	?	41.5	39.0	5.5	5.0	2.0	–	–	–	2.5
Gallup	2–28 Nov 2001	2,021	69.8	44.2	36.8	5.3	3.5	1.4	–	–	–	7.4
Opina/Cadena SER	20 Nov 2001	1,000	?	42.5	39.0	5.0	4.5	2.0	–	–	–	3.5
Opina/Cadena SER	7 Nov 2001	1,000	?	43.0	38.5	5.5	4.5	1.5	–	–	–	4.5
Gallup	1–30 Oct 2001	2,016	70.1	43.9	37.0	4.9	3.8	1.5	–	–	–	6.9
CIS	24–29 Oct 2001	2,499	74.1	43.5	34.0	5.5	4.5	1.4	1.4	–	–	9.5
La Vanguardia	28 Oct 2001	?	?	41.3; 167	37.0; 138	–	–	–	–	–	–	4.3
Opina/Cadena SER	24 Oct 2001	1,000	?	44.0	38.5	5.0	4.5	1.5	–	–	–	5.5
Vox Pública/El Periódico	22–23 Oct 2001	1,509	?	44.5	37.9	5.6	3.7	1.4	–	–	–	6.6
Intercampo/GETS	19 Sep–4 Oct 2001	?	?	42.4	36.3	5.6	4.1	1.8	–	–	–	6.1
Opina/Cadena SER	2 Oct 2001	?	?	43.5	40.0	5.5	4.0	1.5	–	–	–	3.5
Gallup	6–27 Sep 2001	2,027	70.3	42.3	37.2	5.5	4.0	1.6	–	–	–	5.1
Opina/Cadena SER	18 Sep 2001	1,000	?	43.5	39.0	5.0	4.5	1.5	–	–	–	4.5
Opina/Cadena SER	5 Sep 2001	1,000	?	44.0	38.0	5.0	4.6	2.0	–	–	–	6.0
Gallup	2–30 Jul 2001	2,024	70.2	42.1	38.3	5.1	3.4	2.0	–	–	–	3.8
CIS	13–18 Jul 2001	2,485	75.1	43.6	34.9	5.6	3.7	1.5	1.5	–	–	8.7
Opina/Cadena SER	30 Jun 2001	1,000	?	43.5	40.0	5.0	4.5	1.5	–	–	–	3.5
Vox Pública/El Periódico	25–28 Jun 2001	1,506	?	44.0	37.1	5.9	3.2	1.2	–	–	–	6.9
Gallup	6–27 Jun 2001	2,008	69.5	43.6	36.8	5.2	3.6	1.5	–	–	–	6.8
Sigma Dos/El Mundo	24 Jun 2001	?	?	43.4	35.8	5.4	3.9	1.4	–	–	–	7.6
Opina/Cadena SER	13 Jun 2001	1,000	?	44.0	38.0	6.0	4.5	1.5	–	–	–	6.0
La Vanguardia	30 May 2001	?	?	43.5; 180	35.1; 128	–	–	–	–	–	–	8.4
Opina/Cadena SER	30 May 2001	1,000	?	43.0	39.5	5.0	4.5	1.5	–	–	–	3.5
Gallup	4–25 May 2001	2,031	69.8	45.0	34.3	6.3	4.3	1.4	–	–	–	10.7
Opina/Cadena SER	14 May 2001	1,000	?	44.0	38.0	5.5	4.5	2.3	–	–	–	6.0
CIS	20–30 Apr 2001	2,492	73.9	43.5	35.2	4.9	4.0	1.3	1.4	–	–	8.3
Gallup	4–25 Apr 2001	2,026	69.8	43.4	37.6	4.9	3.4	1.5	–	–	–	5.8
Opina/Cadena SER	24 Apr 2001	1,000	?	44.0	38.5	5.5	4.0	2.0	–	–	–	5.5
Vox Pública/El Periódico	16–18 Apr 2001	1,514	?	43.7	38.6	3.7	3.4	1.5	–	–	–	5.1
Opina/Cadena SER	11 Apr 2001	?	?	43.0	40.0	4.5	4.5	1.7	–	–	–	3.0
Opina/Cadena SER	4 Apr 2001	?	?	42.0	37.0	5.0	4.0	1.5	–	–	–	5.0
Gallup	5–30 Mar 2001	2,026	72.3	43.4	35.6	5.5	3.7	1.3	–	–	–	7.8
Opina/Cadena SER	7 Mar 2001	?	?	43.0	38.5	4.5	4.5	2.0	–	–	–	4.5
La Vanguardia	28 Feb 2001	?	?	42.7; 177	35.9; 132	–	–	–	–	–	–	6.8
Gallup	1–26 Feb 2001	2,036	70.3	42.4	37.5	5.4	3.4	1.7	–	–	–	4.9
Opina/Cadena SER	21 Feb 2001	1,000	?	43.0	40.0	4.5	4.0	1.5	–	–	–	3.0
Sigma Dos/El Mundo	18 Feb 2001	800	?	43.5	35.9	4.6	4.1	1.5	–	–	–	7.6
Opina/Cadena SER	7 Feb 2001	?	?	43.0	40.0	5.0	4.5	2.0	–	–	–	3.0
Vox Pública/El Periódico	29–31 Jan 2001	1,519	?	43.5	37.5	4.0	3.5	1.5	–	–	–	6.0
Gallup	8–27 Jan 2001	2,028	71.6	41.9	37.0	5.3	4.4	1.7	–	–	–	4.9
Opina/Cadena SER	24 Jan 2001	?	?	44.0	39.0	4.5	4.5	1.8	–	–	–	5.0
CIS	18–23 Jan 2001	2,486	73.9	43.5	36.2	5.1	3.9	1.4	1.2	–	–	7.3
Opina/Cadena SER	16 Jan 2001	?	?	42.0	39.0	–	–	–	–	–	–	3.0
Opina/Cadena SER	10 Jan 2001	?	?	42.0	38.5	5.0	4.9	1.5	–	–	–	3.5
Sigma Dos/El Mundo	22–29 Dec 2000	?	?	44.6	36.2	4.2	4.0	1.4	–	–	–	8.4
Opitel/Tele 5	28 Dec 2000	?	?	44.5	38.0	3.8	4.5	2.0	–	–	–	6.5
Gallup	7–24 Dec 2000	?	?	44.4	36.9	5.4	3.7	1.9	–	–	–	7.5
Opina/Cadena SER	20 Dec 2000	?	?	44.5	38.5	4.2	4.3	1.8	–	–	–	6.0
Opina/Cadena SER	5 Dec 2000	?	?	44.5	38.5	5.0	4.0	2.0	–	–	–	6.0
La Vanguardia	28 Nov 2000	?	?	42.6; 176	36.0; 133	–	–	–	–	–	–	6.6
Opina/Cadena SER	22 Nov 2000	?	?	45.0	38.0	3.0	4.0	1.5	–	–	–	7.0
Opina/Cadena SER	8 Nov 2000	?	?	44.0	36.0	–	–	–	–	–	–	8.0
Vox Pública/El Periódico	30–31 Oct 2000	1,210	?	44.0	36.7	4.6	4.1	1.2	–	–	–	7.3
Sigma Dos/El Mundo	30 Oct 2000	?	?	46.2	34.2	4.9	3.2	1.5	–	–	–	12.0
Opina/Cadena SER	25 Oct 2000	?	?	42.2	32.8	5.1	3.3	1.7	–	–	–	9.4
CIS	17–22 Oct 2000	2,497	?	43.7	36.2	5.5	3.8	1.5	1.3	–	–	7.5
Demoscopia/El País	9 Oct 2000	?	?	45.0	35.8	6.9	4.4	1.4	–	–	–	9.2
Intercampo/GETS	20 Sep–5 Oct 2000	?	?	42.9	33.7	5.6	4.0	1.3	–	–	–	9.2
Opitel/Tele 5	2 Oct 2000	?	?	44.8	34.9	4.6	4.5	1.0	–	–	–	9.9
Gallup	1–27 Sep 2000	2,025	71.4	45.0	34.9	5.3	4.1	1.3	–	–	–	10.1
La Vanguardia	20 Jul 2000	?	?	47.1; 188	31.5; 119	–	–	–	–	–	–	15.6
CIS	13–18 Jul 2000	2,493	72.9	46.6	31.6	5.9	4.3	1.4	1.5	–	–	15.0
Sigma Dos/El Mundo	16 Jul 2000	?	?	45.7	33.6	5.9	3.5	1.6	–	–	–	12.1
Vox Pública/El Periódico	26–30 Jun 2000	2,300	?	46.5	30.5	5.6	3.8	1.0	–	–	–	16.0
La Vanguardia	7 Jun 2000	?	?	47.5; 189	31.1; 118	–	–	–	–	–	–	16.4
CIS	29 Apr–3 May 2000	2,491	72.0	45.3	32.7	5.9	4.0	1.2	1.5	–	–	12.6
2000 general election	12 Mar 2000	—N/a	68.7	44.5; 183	34.2; 125	5.4; 8	4.2; 15	1.5; 7	1.3; 3	1.1; 4	0.8; 1	10.3

==== Voting preferences ====
The table below lists raw, unweighted voting preferences.

Polling firm/Commissioner	Fieldwork date	Sample size	PP	PSOE	IU	CiU	PNV	BNG	CC	ERC	Question	X mark	Lead
2004 general election (Note: Does not include non-resident citizens.)	14 Mar 2004	—N/a	28.8	32.7	3.8	2.5	1.2	0.6	0.7	1.9	—N/a	22.7	3.9
Vox Pública/El Periódico	1–3 Mar 2004	2,071	30.9	27.0	4.9	2.0	0.9	–	–	–	24.3	2.6	3.9
Noxa/La Vanguardia	27 Feb–3 Mar 2004	2,200	30.9	31.2	–	–	–	–	–	–	–	–	0.3
ASEP	16–21 Feb 2004	1,212	31.2	27.3	6.0	4.1*	*	**	*	2.6**	16.5	8.0	3.9
Gallup	2–20 Feb 2004	2,036	21.6	26.9	5.0	1.0	0.7	–	–	–	24.1	16.5	5.3
CIS	24 Jan–15 Feb 2004	24,109	26.2	22.8	4.0	2.1	0.8	0.5	0.4	1.5	31.0	6.8	3.4
Noxa/La Vanguardia	6–12 Feb 2004	1,800	32.6	31.9	–	–	–	–	–	–	–	–	0.7
Opina/El País	25 Jan 2004	3,000	28.1	22.5	3.6	–	–	–	–	–	36.6	–	5.6
ASEP	19–24 Jan 2004	1,201	31.4	29.8	5.2	5.1*	*	**	*	2.9**	14.4	7.3	1.6
Gallup	5–22 Jan 2004	2,028	22.6	24.3	4.4	1.2	1.3	–	–	–	26.8	16.2	1.7
Vox Pública/El Periódico	19–21 Jan 2004	1,501	34.9	33.0	3.7	1.1	0.7	–	–	–	12.8	6.5	1.9
CIS	10–15 Jan 2004	2,489	27.8	21.3	3.3	1.4	1.1	0.5	0.4	1.1	32.2	6.9	6.5
Noxa/La Vanguardia	7–9 Jan 2004	1,000	36.5	28.2	–	–	–	–	–	–	–	–	8.3
Gallup	1–19 Dec 2003	2,025	23.5	21.0	4.9	1.1	1.5	–	–	–	27.6	17.9	2.5
ASEP	9–13 Dec 2003	1,207	29.1	30.4	4.0	5.5*	*	**	*	3.4**	14.1	10.5	1.3
Opina/El País	7 Dec 2003	1,000	27.5	21.3	3.2	–	–	–	–	–	38.3	–	6.2
Gallup	4–25 Nov 2003	2,032	23.6	23.5	4.8	0.7	1.4	–	–	–	24.5	18.5	0.1
ASEP	10–15 Nov 2003	1,205	27.6	25.8	4.5	4.7*	*	**	*	3.0**	19.7	9.5	1.8
CIS	25–31 Oct 2003	2,488	27.5	24.4	3.7	2.2	0.6	0.5	0.6	0.8	24.5	9.3	3.1
Gallup	3–22 Oct 2003	2,016	23.2	23.4	4.2	1.1	2.5	–	–	–	25.4	17.6	0.2
ASEP	13–18 Oct 2003	1,205	27.7	28.1	4.6	5.2*	*	**	*	2.2**	18.4	8.7	0.4
Vox Pública/El Periódico	22–24 Sep 2003	1,502	35.9	29.8	3.6	1.7	1.2	–	–	–	13.4	6.9	6.1
Gallup	1–24 Sep 2003	2,027	24.6	22.6	4.9	1.0	1.7	–	–	–	27.2	14.8	2.0
ASEP	15–20 Sep 2003	1,214	27.5	33.5	3.1	4.5*	*	**	*	1.5**	17.8	8.3	6.0
Gallup	1–18 Aug 2003	2,026	22.5	24.8	3.5	1.2	1.7	–	–	–	28.4	15.1	2.3
Gallup	1–24 Jul 2003	2,032	23.4	26.0	4.0	0.8	1.3	–	–	–	22.3	18.9	2.6
CIS	2–8 Jul 2003	2,476	25.2	26.1	4.9	2.4	0.8	0.7	0.3	1.2	22.5	9.6	0.9
ASEP	30 Jun–5 Jul 2003	1,212	27.6	30.4	5.3	4.3*	*	**	*	2.7**	14.8	10.9	2.8
Vox Pública/El Periódico	23–25 Jun 2003	1,502	31.0	30.3	5.4	1.3	0.9	–	–	–	14.4	6.6	0.7
Gallup	2–20 Jun 2003	2,024	26.6	24.3	5.0	0.5	0.7	–	–	–	23.9	15.0	2.3
ASEP	2–7 Jun 2003	1,215	27.7	30.0	4.8	5.6*	*	**	*	3.0**	17.1	8.6	2.3
Gallup	5–26 May 2003	2,026	19.2	27.5	4.4	0.6	0.7	–	–	–	28.1	14.0	8.3
ASEP	5–10 May 2003	1,210	25.4	30.9	5.1	4.3*	*	**	*	1.6**	19.6	8.4	5.5
CIS	24–30 Apr 2003	2,494	21.8	27.4	4.3	2.0	1.3	0.6	0.4	0.8	26.1	8.6	5.6
Gallup	1–22 Apr 2003	2,020	16.4	28.7	3.7	0.7	0.8	–	–	–	29.4	16.3	12.3
ASEP	7–12 Apr 2003	1,205	18.6	34.5	4.2	4.7*	*	**	*	2.4**	20.9	9.1	15.9
Vox Pública/El Periódico	31 Mar–2 Apr 2003	1,503	20.4	33.7	4.1	2.3	0.9	–	–	–	17.4	9.8	13.3
Gallup	3–25 Mar 2003	2,016	18.4	30.1	3.2	0.9	0.7	–	–	–	24.8	19.0	11.7
ASEP	10–16 Mar 2003	1,210	22.7	32.5	3.3	5.1*	*	**	*	2.2**	18.4	10.2	9.8
Gallup	3–24 Feb 2003	2,028	18.2	26.9	4.3	1.1	1.5	–	–	–	25.2	20.0	8.7
ASEP	10–15 Feb 2003	1,209	24.4	32.4	3.8	4.7*	*	**	*	2.3**	18.2	9.7	8.0
CIS	21–26 Jan 2003	2,480	23.2	24.4	3.4	2.4	1.4	0.7	0.3	0.9	25.3	11.7	1.2
Gallup	7–23 Jan 2003	2,034	20.0	27.3	3.6	0.7	1.9	–	–	–	23.8	18.9	7.3
ASEP	13–18 Jan 2003	1,215	23.5	28.2	4.2	5.0*	*	**	*	2.5**	20.5	11.4	4.7
Vox Pública/El Periódico	13–16 Jan 2003	1,501	27.8	27.6	4.0	1.6	0.9	–	–	–	18.8	9.6	0.2
Gallup	2–23 Dec 2002	2,011	17.6	25.3	3.1	0.8	1.1	–	–	–	29.6	18.3	7.7
ASEP	2–8 Dec 2002	1,210	22.4	30.8	3.6	5.3*	*	**	*	3.5**	17.3	12.1	8.4
Gallup	4–25 Nov 2002	2,018	20.6	25.1	4.1	0.7	0.7	–	–	–	25.6	19.2	4.5
ASEP	4–9 Nov 2002	1,202	22.8	31.8	4.0	4.0*	*	**	*	2.5**	18.6	10.9	9.0
Gallup	1–24 Oct 2002	2,018	19.0	25.4	3.7	1.1	1.1	–	–	–	27.5	19.4	6.4
CIS	16–21 Oct 2002	2,489	24.5	25.2	2.9	2.2	0.8	0.4	0.3	1.2	25.3	11.5	0.7
ASEP	7–13 Oct 2002	1,208	27.7	24.7	4.5	4.4*	*	**	*	2.0**	19.6	11.5	3.0
Vox Pública/El Periódico	7–9 Oct 2002	1,507	29.5	25.8	3.2	1.7	1.3	–	–	–	21.1	8.6	3.7
CIS	9 Sep–9 Oct 2002	10,476	23.1	26.3	3.5	2.5	1.1	0.5	0.4	1.1	26.1	10.3	3.2
ASEP	9–15 Sep 2002	1,212	25.4	27.6	4.8	5.8*	*	**	*	2.3**	18.1	11.5	2.2
Gallup	1–23 Aug 2002	2,008	20.8	25.3	4.2	0.5	0.9	–	–	–	25.5	20.1	4.5
Gallup	2–29 Jul 2002	2,013	22.4	26.2	3.0	0.8	0.6	–	–	–	23.5	20.7	3.8
CIS	16–21 Jul 2002	2,482	25.4	24.0	2.9	2.0	0.8	0.7	0.3	0.6	26.2	11.8	1.4
ASEP	8–14 Jul 2002	1,212	26.0	29.8	4.8	5.7*	*	**	*	2.3**	16.3	10.5	3.8
Vox Pública/El Periódico	24–26 Jun 2002	1,504	25.8	28.1	3.5	1.6	1.0	–	–	–	19.4	11.6	2.3
Gallup	1–24 Jun 2002	2,016	23.2	21.6	4.0	1.0	0.6	–	–	–	24.8	21.6	1.6
ASEP	10–16 Jun 2002	1,222	26.7	24.2	4.9	5.0*	*	**	*	1.9**	18.9	13.3	2.5
Gallup	3–22 May 2002	2,010	25.1	25.4	3.5	0.8	1.1	–	–	–	22.3	19.0	0.3
ASEP	9–17 May 2002	1,209	29.6	25.4	3.6	4.7*	*	**	*	1.1**	17.7	12.0	4.2
Gallup	1–23 Apr 2002	2,017	22.0	25.3	3.1	1.2	0.7	–	–	–	25.0	19.5	3.3
CIS	16–21 Apr 2002	2,498	26.8	20.9	3.6	2.5	0.8	0.5	0.3	0.7	25.6	12.5	5.9
Vox Pública/El Periódico	15–17 Apr 2002	1,510	27.5	24.8	4.0	2.1	1.2	–	–	–	20.3	10.9	2.7
ASEP	8–14 Apr 2002	1,216	28.7	25.9	3.7	4.4*	*	**	*	1.1**	17.8	13.8	2.8
Gallup	4–27 Mar 2002	2,029	21.0	22.2	3.5	0.5	0.8	–	–	–	29.3	20.0	1.2
ASEP	11–17 Mar 2002	1,220	28.9	26.2	4.0	4.1*	*	**	*	2.4**	17.3	12.2	2.7
Gallup	4–27 Feb 2002	2,030	23.3	23.5	4.2	0.9	0.9	–	–	–	25.3	18.6	0.2
ASEP	11–17 Feb 2002	1,214	27.9	28.5	3.0	4.8*	*	**	*	2.0**	17.0	13.3	0.6
Vox Pública/El Periódico	4–5 Feb 2002	1,506	29.4	27.8	2.8	2.1	1.7	–	–	–	18.9	9.9	1.6
CIS	27–31 Jan 2002	2,498	29.2	20.7	3.8	2.2	0.8	0.6	0.3	0.8	26.1	10.4	8.5
Gallup	4–29 Jan 2002	2,031	26.5	21.3	3.2	0.7	1.3	–	–	–	25.6	18.0	5.2
ASEP	14–19 Jan 2002	1,224	29.8	26.5	3.9	4.9*	*	**	*	1.9**	17.3	11.0	3.3
Gallup	3–28 Dec 2001	2,020	21.5	26.2	3.7	0.9	0.8	–	–	–	26.5	16.6	4.7
ASEP	10–15 Dec 2001	1,210	26.3	25.5	4.6	4.9*	*	**	*	1.7**	17.9	12.4	0.8
Gallup	2–28 Nov 2001	2,021	24.1	22.2	3.6	0.8	1.0	–	–	–	28.7	17.0	1.9
ASEP	12–17 Nov 2001	1,209	31.3	23.2	3.4	4.8*	*	**	*	1.8**	18.8	11.5	8.1
Gallup	1–30 Oct 2001	2,016	24.6	23.3	2.7	1.4	1.8	–	–	–	27.1	16.4	1.3
CIS	24–29 Oct 2001	2,499	26.8	22.4	3.5	3.2	1.2	0.6	0.5	1.1	24.0	11.2	4.4
Vox Pública/El Periódico	22–23 Oct 2001	1,509	33.2	27.3	4.2	2.0	1.1	–	–	–	17.5	8.4	5.9
ASEP	15–20 Oct 2001	1,212	29.7	23.7	4.7	5.2*	*	**	*	2.0**	19.6	11.7	6.0
Gallup	6–27 Sep 2001	2,027	22.7	22.7	3.3	1.9	1.7	–	–	–	27.0	17.2	Tie
ASEP	17–22 Sep 2001	1,210	28.3	22.7	4.8	4.9*	*	**	*	1.5**	21.5	11.0	5.6
Gallup	2–30 Jul 2001	2,024	23.7	22.0	3.6	0.8	1.7	–	–	–	21.7	18.0	1.7
CIS	13–18 Jul 2001	2,485	27.8	24.1	3.5	2.7	1.1	0.8	0.2	0.8	23.5	11.2	3.7
ASEP	9–14 Jul 2001	1,210	25.9	27.2	4.0	5.3*	*	**	*	2.9**	16.2	12.8	1.3
Vox Pública/El Periódico	25–28 Jun 2001	1,506	31.1	27.0	4.2	1.3	1.0	–	–	–	16.7	10.2	4.1
Gallup	6–27 Jun 2001	2,008	24.9	24.7	3.3	1.9	1.7	–	–	–	23.4	16.8	0.2
ASEP	11–16 Jun 2001	1,213	26.4	26.6	4.0	4.8*	*	**	*	1.6**	20.8	10.1	0.2
Gallup	4–25 May 2001	2,031	23.8	22.3	3.3	1.4	0.6	–	–	–	31.1	14.8	1.5
ASEP	11–19 May 2001	1,214	28.7	22.4	5.6	5.6*	*	**	*	2.1**	20.0	10.4	6.3
CIS	20–30 Apr 2001	2,492	27.6	21.7	3.3	2.9	0.9	0.8	0.5	1.1	25.8	10.3	5.9
Gallup	4–25 Apr 2001	2,026	24.2	22.0	3.7	0.7	1.0	–	–	–	28.8	14.8	2.2
ASEP	16–21 Apr 2001	1,209	29.6	26.3	4.2	4.5*	*	**	*	2.2**	18.7	10.7	3.3
Vox Pública/El Periódico	16–18 Apr 2001	1,514	31.5	26.7	2.9	2.2	1.0	–	–	–	19.5	8.9	4.8
Gallup	5–30 Mar 2001	2,026	24.7	22.9	3.4	0.9	0.9	–	–	–	29.4	16.5	1.8
ASEP	12–17 Mar 2001	1,205	27.9	26.4	5.7	5.0*	*	**	*	3.2**	16.2	11.3	1.5
Gallup	1–26 Feb 2001	2,036	22.9	21.3	3.8	1.3	1.2	–	–	–	29.4	16.5	1.6
ASEP	12–17 Feb 2001	1,212	30.2	25.7	3.8	4.9*	*	**	*	2.5**	18.3	10.8	4.5
Vox Pública/El Periódico	29–31 Jan 2001	1,519	29.6	26.7	3.1	1.8	1.2	–	–	–	20.0	9.3	2.9
Gallup	8–27 Jan 2001	2,028	22.7	25.4	3.0	1.9	1.0	–	–	–	28.2	14.4	2.7
CIS	18–23 Jan 2001	2,486	27.2	23.3	3.3	2.5	1.0	0.5	0.4	0.5	24.5	11.7	3.9
ASEP	15–20 Jan 2001	1,211	26.1	28.0	4.2	6.8*	*	**	*	2.2**	18.2	10.1	1.9
ASEP	11–16 Dec 2000	1,210	28.0	26.9	5.0	5.0*	*	**	*	2.5**	16.6	11.0	1.1
ASEP	6–11 Nov 2000	1,210	30.1	25.8	4.5	4.5*	*	**	*	1.7**	19.1	10.1	4.3
Vox Pública/El Periódico	30–31 Oct 2000	1,210	34.6	26.0	3.4	2.9	1.0	–	–	–	16.2	9.2	8.6
CIS	17–22 Oct 2000	2,497	30.2	22.1	3.6	2.7	1.2	0.7	0.4	1.1	24.6	9.5	8.1
ASEP	9–16 Oct 2000	1,212	29.7	26.4	4.2	4.5*	*	**	*	2.1**	18.6	10.4	3.3
Demoscopia/El País	9 Oct 2000	?	27.9	21.7	4.2	2.7	–	–	–	–	23.7	13.7	6.2
Gallup	1–27 Sep 2000	2,025	25.1	20.8	3.8	1.4	0.3	–	–	–	30.8	13.6	4.3
ASEP	11–16 Sep 2000	1,214	31.9	22.6	5.4	5.2*	*	**	*	2.6**	17.6	10.2	9.3
CIS	13–18 Jul 2000	2,493	32.5	17.1	3.6	2.8	0.9	0.6	0.2	0.8	24.5	11.5	15.4
ASEP	3–8 Jul 2000	1,218	37.4	23.4	4.8	5.7*	*	**	*	2.7**	15.6	7.7	14.0
Vox Pública/El Periódico	26–30 Jun 2000	2,300	39.0	19.1	5.4	3.0	1.0	–	–	–	14.8	9.3	19.9
ASEP	5–10 Jun 2000	1,211	36.9	21.8	5.1	5.7*	*	**	*	2.6**	14.8	10.0	15.1
ASEP	8–13 May 2000	1,221	37.0	23.2	5.2	5.8*	*	**	*	1.7**	14.9	8.5	13.8
CIS	29 Apr–3 May 2000	2,491	34.1	15.9	4.4	3.2	0.8	0.8	0.6	1.3	21.8	10.9	18.2
ASEP	10–15 Apr 2000	1,210	36.2	22.2	4.3	6.9*	*	**	*	2.6**	14.0	9.1	14.0
ASEP	13–20 Mar 2000	1,208	36.3	21.5	5.1	7.0*	*	**	*	2.7**	14.6	8.8	14.8
2000 general election	12 Mar 2000	—N/a	31.0	23.7	3.8	2.9	1.1	0.9	0.7	0.6	—N/a	30.0	7.3
(*) Includes data for CiU, PNV, EA, PAR, UPN, PA, UV, EU and CC. (**) Includes data for ERC, BNG and CHA.

==== Victory preference ====
The table below lists opinion polling on the victory preferences for each party in the event of a general election taking place.

Polling firm/Commissioner	Fieldwork date	Sample size	PP	PSOE	IU	CiU	PNV	Other/ None	Question	Lead
Opina/Cadena SER	7 Mar 2004	?	35.7	41.2	–	–	–	8.0	15.1	5.5
Opina/Cadena SER	6 Mar 2004	?	35.9	40.0	–	–	–	8.1	16.0	4.1
Opina/Cadena SER	5 Mar 2004	?	35.6	40.1	–	–	–	7.9	16.3	4.5
Opina/Cadena SER	4 Mar 2004	?	36.6	39.1	–	–	–	8.4	15.8	2.5
Opina/Cadena SER	3 Mar 2004	?	37.2	39.0	–	–	–	8.0	15.8	1.8
Noxa/La Vanguardia	27 Feb–3 Mar 2004	2,200	36.3	42.0	–	–	–	–	–	5.7
Opina/Cadena SER	2 Mar 2004	?	37.0	38.4	–	–	–	8.8	15.8	1.4
Opina/Cadena SER	1 Mar 2004	?	36.5	38.6	–	–	–	9.1	15.8	2.1
Opina/El País	27 Feb–1 Mar 2004	4,000	33.7	38.3	–	–	–	4.1	24.1	4.6
Opina/Cadena SER	29 Feb 2004	?	37.2	37.6	–	–	–	10.3	14.9	0.4
Opina/Cadena SER	28 Feb 2004	?	37.6	36.9	–	–	–	10.3	15.3	0.7
Opina/Cadena SER	27 Feb 2004	?	38.1	36.4	–	–	–	9.7	15.8	1.7
Opina/Cadena SER	26 Feb 2004	3,000	37.4	37.5	–	–	–	8.3	16.9	0.1
CIS	24 Jan–15 Feb 2004	24,109	32.1	34.0	4.7	1.2	0.6	10.0	17.5	1.9
Opina/Cadena SER	11 Feb 2004	1,000	36.6	39.9	–	–	–	8.1	15.4	3.3
Opina/Cadena SER	31 Jan 2004	1,000	37.5	38.5	–	–	–	5.6	18.4	1.0
Opina/El País	25 Jan 2004	3,000	36.6	35.5	–	–	–	6.0	21.9	1.1
Opina/Cadena SER	16 Jan 2004	1,000	39.4	38.2	–	–	–	8.2	14.2	1.2
Opina/Cadena SER	2 Jan 2004	?	37.1	39.2	–	–	–	5.3	18.4	2.1
Opina/Cadena SER	19 Nov 2003	1,000	36.5	38.2	–	–	–	4.6	20.7	1.7
Opina/Cadena SER	24 Sep 2003	1,000	36.8	36.6	–	–	–	6.5	20.1	0.2
Opina/Cadena SER	10 Sep 2003	1,000	39.0	36.5	–	–	–	4.6	19.9	2.5
Opina/Cadena SER	2 Sep 2003	1,000	38.9	36.2	–	–	–	6.1	18.8	2.7
Opina/Cadena SER	27 Aug 2003	1,000	36.7	39.1	–	–	–	5.1	19.1	2.4
Opina/Cadena SER	11 Jun 2003	?	37.4	40.1	–	–	–	5.0	17.5	2.7
Opina/Cadena SER	28 May 2003	?	37.1	42.2	–	–	–	2.7	18.0	5.1
Opina/Cadena SER	15 May 2003	1,000	35.6	39.8	–	–	–	4.0	20.6	4.2
Noxa/La Vanguardia	22–24 Apr 2003	1,000	37.0	40.0	5.0	2.0	1.0	10.0	6.0	3.0
Opina/Cadena SER	23 Apr 2003	1,000	29.3	41.6	–	–	–	3.6	25.5	12.3
Opina/Cadena SER	2 Apr 2003	?	27.1	49.4	–	–	–	3.6	19.9	22.3
Opina/Cadena SER	21 Mar 2003	1,000	25.9	44.1	–	–	–	4.5	25.5	18.2
Opina/Cadena SER	8 Mar 2003	1,000	26.2	46.7	–	–	–	3.5	23.6	20.5
Opina/Cadena SER	19 Feb 2003	1,000	27.8	44.1	–	–	–	3.5	24.6	16.3
Opina/Cadena SER	6 Feb 2003	?	28.2	43.6	–	–	–	3.6	24.6	15.4
Opina/Cadena SER	22 Jan 2003	1,000	28.6	41.8	–	–	–	3.3	26.3	13.2
Opina/Cadena SER	8 Jan 2003	1,000	31.9	40.1	–	–	–	2.3	25.7	8.2
Opina/Cadena SER	17 Dec 2002	1,000	29.8	39.3	–	–	–	3.8	27.1	9.5
Opina/Cadena SER	4 Dec 2002	1,000	30.7	41.4	–	–	–	3.5	24.4	8.2
Opina/Cadena SER	20 Nov 2002	1,000	33.0	38.7	–	–	–	2.8	25.5	5.7
Opina/Cadena SER	6 Nov 2002	1,000	31.4	42.3	–	–	–	1.4	24.9	10.9
Opina/Cadena SER	23 Oct 2002	1,000	30.6	37.6	–	–	–	3.1	27.7	7.0

==== Victory likelihood ====
The table below lists opinion polling on the perceived likelihood of victory for each party in the event of a general election taking place.

Polling firm/Commissioner	Fieldwork date	Sample size	PP	PSOE	Other/ None	Question	Lead
Opina/Cadena SER	7 Mar 2004	?	70.3	12.6	0.6	16.5	57.7
Opina/Cadena SER	6 Mar 2004	?	70.1	12.8	0.7	16.3	57.3
Opina/Cadena SER	5 Mar 2004	?	68.1	12.8	0.8	18.2	55.3
Opina/Cadena SER	4 Mar 2004	?	68.2	12.9	0.9	17.9	55.3
Opina/Cadena SER	3 Mar 2004	?	67.8	12.2	0.9	19.2	55.6
Opina/Cadena SER	2 Mar 2004	?	68.5	11.8	0.8	18.9	56.7
Opina/Cadena SER	1 Mar 2004	?	67.8	12.1	0.9	19.2	55.7
Opina/El País	27 Feb–1 Mar 2004	4,000	66.2	11.4	0.3	22.2	54.8
Opina/Cadena SER	29 Feb 2004	?	67.7	13.2	1.1	17.9	54.5
Opina/Cadena SER	28 Feb 2004	?	67.2	13.9	1.2	17.6	53.3
Opina/Cadena SER	27 Feb 2004	?	67.0	13.4	1.2	18.3	53.6
Opina/Cadena SER	26 Feb 2004	3,000	66.9	13.3	0.9	18.9	53.6
Infortécnica	26 Feb 2004	4,656	64.5	13.7	1.0	20.7	50.8
CIS	24 Jan–15 Feb 2004	24,109	63.4	11.0	1.5	24.2	52.4
Opina/Cadena SER	11 Feb 2004	1,000	70.8	12.3	0.6	16.3	58.5
Opina/Cadena SER	31 Jan 2004	1,000	70.0	13.2	0.4	16.4	56.8
Opina/El País	25 Jan 2004	3,000	67.6	11.3	0.1	21.0	56.3
Opina/Cadena SER	16 Jan 2004	1,000	71.9	11.8	0.6	15.7	60.1
Opina/Cadena SER	2 Jan 2004	?	70.5	9.9	0.3	19.3	60.6
Opina/Cadena SER	19 Nov 2003	1,000	73.3	9.7	0.3	16.7	63.6
ASEP	13–18 Oct 2003	1,205	54.1	17.2	0.6	28.1	36.9
Opina/Cadena SER	24 Sep 2003	1,000	67.6	14.5	0.3	17.6	53.1
ASEP	15–20 Sep 2003	1,214	52.8	19.4	0.2	27.5	33.4
Opina/Cadena SER	10 Sep 2003	1,000	69.5	11.7	0.5	18.3	57.8
Opina/Cadena SER	2 Sep 2003	1,000	68.2	16.2	0.3	15.3	52.0
Opina/Cadena SER	27 Aug 2003	1,000	64.1	19.4	0.5	16.0	44.7
Opina/Cadena SER	11 Jun 2003	?	56.2	22.9	0.6	20.3	33.3
Opina/Cadena SER	28 May 2003	?	53.8	26.2	0.6	19.4	27.6
Opina/Cadena SER	15 May 2003	1,000	45.2	31.8	0.5	22.5	13.4
Noxa/La Vanguardia	22–24 Apr 2003	1,000	39.0	46.0	2.0	13.0	7.0
Opina/Cadena SER	23 Apr 2003	1,000	33.3	42.6	0.4	23.7	9.3
Opina/Cadena SER	2 Apr 2003	?	24.6	54.6	0.3	20.5	30.0
Opina/Cadena SER	21 Mar 2003	1,000	26.6	47.1	0.6	25.7	20.5
Opina/Cadena SER	8 Mar 2003	1,000	37.3	39.1	0.2	23.4	1.8
Opina/Cadena SER	19 Feb 2003	1,000	34.5	38.4	0.6	26.5	3.9
Opina/Cadena SER	6 Feb 2003	?	41.8	30.5	0.8	26.9	11.3
Opina/Cadena SER	22 Jan 2003	1,000	51.0	24.2	0.6	24.2	26.8
Opina/Cadena SER	8 Jan 2003	1,000	48.8	25.7	0.1	25.4	23.1
Opina/Cadena SER	17 Dec 2002	1,000	45.4	29.1	0.6	24.9	16.3
Opina/Cadena SER	4 Dec 2002	1,000	50.4	24.7	0.3	24.6	25.7
Opina/Cadena SER	20 Nov 2002	1,000	58.6	20.6	0.3	20.5	38.0
Opina/Cadena SER	6 Nov 2002	1,000	48.6	25.9	0.2	25.3	22.7
Opina/Cadena SER	23 Oct 2002	1,000	58.5	17.7	0.3	23.5	40.8

=== Sub-national polling ===
==== Catalonia ====
Polling firm/Commissioner	Fieldwork date	Sample size	Turnout	PSC	CiU	PP	ERC	ICV	EUiA	Lead
2004 general election	14 Mar 2004	—N/a	76.0	39.5; 21	20.8; 10	15.6; 6	15.9; 8	5.8; 2	(Note: Within ICV.)	18.7
Vox Pública/El Periódico	1–3 Mar 2004	571	?	37.0; 17/19	20.6; 10/11	20.6; 10/11	13.2; 6/7	6.0; 2		16.4
Noxa/La Vanguardia	27 Feb–3 Mar 2004	700	?	38.0; 19/20	20.3; 10	20.8; 10	11.4; 5/6	7.4; 1/2		17.2
Noxa/La Vanguardia	6–12 Feb 2004	600	?	37.2; 18	18.2; 9	22.3; 11/12	12.7; 6/7	7.3; 2		14.9
ERC	8–15 Jan 2004	2,000	?	? 16/17	? 12/14	? 9/10	? 5/7	? 2/3	–	?
Vox Pública/PSC	16–18 Dec 2002	805	?	42.0– 43.0	20.5– 21.5	20.0– 21.0	6.5– 7.5	4.5– 5.5		21.5
Vox Pública/El Periódico	7–9 Oct 2002	?	?	39.5	22.5	22.0	–	–	–	17.0
CIS	9 Sep–9 Oct 2002	922	76.2	36.4	25.1	20.6	7.7	5.3	–	11.3
Opina/La Vanguardia	6 Nov 2000	800	?	36.0	26.5	21.0	7.5	4.0	–	9.5
Vox Pública/El Periódico	26–30 Jun 2000	801	?	30.0	26.5	28.0	5.1	3.3	3.5	2.0
2000 general election	12 Mar 2000	—N/a	64.0	34.1; 17	28.8; 15	22.8; 12	5.6; 1	3.5; 1	2.2; 0	5.3
