= 2001 Madrid bombing =

Terrorist incident in Spain

- Part of Basque conflict
- Location: 40.4408°N 3.6712°W; Madrid, Spain
- Date: 6 November 2001 (UTC+02:00)
- Attack type: Bombing
- Weapon: Car bomb
- Deaths: 0
- Injuries: 99
- Perpetrator: ETA

On 6 November 2001, the separatist Basque organization ETA detonated a car bomb on Corazón de María street in Madrid, Spain. The blast injured about 99 people. It has been claimed the ETA targeted Juan Junquera, a government official, who survived.

The attack was one of many that occurred in Madrid in 2001 in the ETA's campaign.

== See also ==
- 2000 Madrid bombing
- List of ETA attacks
