= Gescartera affair =

Corruption scandal in Spain

The Gescartera affair (Spanish: caso Gescartera) was a political corruption case in Spain during the premiership of José María Aznar. Some 20 billion pesetas (more than 120 million euros) disappeared as a result of the scandal, which registered over 2,000 affected parties who had trusted the Gescartera investment company, including public mutual societies, foundations, NGOs, religious congregations and public companies.

In the summer of 2001, it was unveiled that the Gescartera investment company had engaged in profit-making activities by defrauding its clients through the misappropriation of funds and influence peddling; the scandal saw the resignations of the then treasury state secretary, Enrique Giménez-Reyna (brother to Gescartera's chairwoman, Pilar) and the president of the National Securities Market Commission.

Judicials investigation resulted in the convictions, in 2008, of Antonio Camacho (Gescartera's owner), Pilar Giménez-Reyna and other high-ranking officials in the company.
