= Unemployment benefits in Spain =

Unemployment benefits in Spain are contributory and non-contributory. They are part of social security system in Spain and are managed by the State Public Employment Service (SEPE). Employers and employees contribute to the unemployment contingency fund and if an unemployed person fulfills certain criteria they can claim an allowance which is based on the time they have contributed and their average wage. A non-contributory benefit is also available to those who no longer receive a contributory benefit dependent on a maximum level of income.

== Introduction ==
The current unemployment insurance system was established by act of parliament on 23 of July 1961 in the form of the Seguro Nacional de Desempleo (National Unemployment Insurance). It followed previous systems established starting in the 1930s. A reform in 2010 resulted in the inclusion of the self-employed and domestic workers within the scheme. As of January 2025, the unemployment rate is at 10.61% of the labor force., meanwhile the youth unemployment in Spain stands at 24.9%.

== Contributory benefits ==
The main allowance paid to the unemployed is a contributory allowance known as 'prestación por desempleo'.

=== Content of Unemployment Protection ===
Unemployment insurance benefits include financial contributions to the unemployed person based on whether the individual is totally or partially unemployed. It also provides financial contributions from the Social Security in addition to the unemployment insurance. It will also provide training, counseling, and vocational training to help individuals gain employment.

=== Requirements ===
In order to receive a contributory benefit a person must be legally unemployed after making unemployment contributions at least 360 days in the last 6 years and be registered with the employment authorities as available for work

=== Benefit Amount and duration ===
The unemployment benefit is paid for a minimum of 4 months and maximum of 24 months, based on the period that the unemployed person has contributed.

Contribution period (in days)	Benefit period (in days)
From 360 to 539	120
From 540 to 719	180
From 720 to 899	240
From 900 to 1,079	300
From 1,080 to 1,259	360
From 1,260 to 1,439	420
From 1,440 to 1,619	480
From 1,620 to 1,799	540
From 1,800 to 1,979	600
From 1,800 to 2,159	660
Over 2,160	720

The benefit amount is based on the most recent 180 days salary with both a minimum and a maximum amount. The average daily salary of the last 180 days is multiplied by 30 to arrive at a monthly benefit base. The monthly benefit amount is 70% of the monthly base for the first six months of unemployment and 50% of the monthly base for additional months, unless limited by the minimum or maximum amounts allowed. The base amount is supplemented if the unemployed person has dependent children. A dependent child lives with the recipient and is either under age 26 or 26 or older with a disability of 33% or more. A child may not be a dependent of multiple unemployment recipients.

==== Minimum and Maximum Benefit Amounts ====
The monthly benefit amount limits are calculated using the monthly Public Income Index or es:Indicador Público de Renta de Efectos Múltiples (IPREM). Unemployment from part-time employment is modified based on the number of hours worked.

Dependent Children	Minimum	Maximum
0 (zero)	80% IPREM + 1/6 monthly benefit	175% IPREM
1 (one)	107% IPREM + 1/6 monthly benefit	200% IPREM
≥2 (two or more)	107% IPREM + 1/6 monthly benefit	225% IPREM

==== Withheld Amount ====
Personal income tax (see Taxation in Spain) and Social Security contributions are withheld from the monthly benefit amount. While receiving unemployment benefit, a worker must remain registered with Social Security. The amount of Social Security withholding from the unemployment benefit will be based on the average withholding for "common contingencies" (4.7% of salary) from the previous six months of employment.

== Non-contributory benefits ==
The 'Subsidio de desempleo' is a non-contributory benefit targeted at those who no longer qualify for the contributory benefits due to duration of unemployment or lack of contributions and is means-dependent.

== Finance ==
Both the contributory and non-contributory benefits are financed through a 1.55% contribution by employees and 5,5% by employers on employees salaries up to 3262 euros per month

== Unemployment Benefits and the Disabled ==
There are many people with disabilities in Spain. According to the National Statistics survey, 87.1% of disabled people are able to work but have to overcome job specific barriers in order to be employed. Barriers could include training barriers and education barriers. In 1982, Spain passed a law to help individuals with disabilities to find jobs. The law is known as the Law for Disabled People's Social Integration. The law only applies to business owners with more than 50 workers. The law requires that 2% of hired employees and workers to be disabled. It helped integrate the unemployed back into the population.

== International Unemployment Benefits in Spain ==
If an individual in the European Union is receiving unemployment benefits in another country in Europe they are also eligible to receive unemployment benefits in Spain. The circumstances required are that it is a maximum of three months. The maximum limit one can receive for these benefits from another country is 175% of the IPREM. The number of children that beneficiary has will also contribute to the amount they receive.
