= 1992 Madrid bombing =

1992 terrorist incident in Madrid, Spain

Coordinates: 40°24′50″N 3°42′42″W

1992 Madrid attack
- Part of the Basque conflict
- Location: Madrid, Spain
- Date: 6 February 1992; 0835 (UTC+1)
- Target: Army
- Attack type: car bomb
- Deaths: 5
- Injuries: 7
- Perpetrator: ETA

A car bombing was carried out by the armed Basque separatist group ETA in Madrid, Spain on 6 February 1992, killing 5 people and injured a further 7. The target was a military vehicle transporting members of the army. The dead included three captains, a soldier driving the vehicle and a civilian working for the armed forces. This was ETA's deadliest attack of 1992.

== Background ==
ETA had begun intensifying attacks in the early 1990s in the run up to the 1992 Summer Olympics in Barcelona to try to gain wider publicity for their cause. This attack was the first that they had carried out in 1992 in Madrid and came weeks after the civil guard and Basque police had infiltrated an extortion ring set up to fund ETA.

== The attack ==
The vehicle used in the attack, an Opel Kadett, had been stolen at gunpoint in September 1991 in the Basque town of Zarautz. It was then hidden and had its number plates changed. On the day of the attack, the car was loaded with between 40 and 50 kilos of explosives and a variety of screws, bolts, and nails. It was parked only minutes before the explosion in Plaza de la Cruz Verde, just 200 metres from the General captaincy, the headquarters of the army in Madrid. ETA detonated the bomb remotely when the military vehicle passed. The bomb killed all those in the vehicle, injured seven passersby and caused extensive damage to nearby buildings.

== Reactions ==
The attack took the number of people killed by ETA in 1992 to ten. Spanish Prime Minister Felipe Gonzalez expressed anger at the attack, reiterating that it would not lead to the government changing its stance. He called for judicial action against those responsible for such attacks, such as Herri Batasuna, the political wing of ETA. The leader of the opposition, José María Aznar, called for a decision to be made on whether Batasuna should remain legal as a political party. The King of Spain, Juan Carlos, sent a telegram of condolence to the families of those killed. In the Basque Country, Basque President José Antonio Ardanza Garro condemned the attack, stating that such attacks were ultimately "suicidal" for ETA.
