= October 2000 Madrid bombing =

Terrorist incident in Spain

2000 Madrid bombing
- Part of Basque conflict
- Location: Madrid, Spain
- Date: 30 October 2000; 07:15 a.m. (UTC+01:00)
- Attack type: Bombing
- Weapon: Car bomb
- Deaths: 4
- Injuries: 64
- Perpetrator: ETA

On 30 October 2000, the separatist Basque organization ETA detonated a large car bomb on Badajoz Avenue in Madrid, Spain. The blast killed three people; a Spanish Supreme Court judge, Francisco Querol Lombardero, his driver, and his bodyguard. One of the injured, a bus driver, died from his injuries days later. Sixty-four people were wounded. It was the deadliest attack since the ETA called off its ceasefire in December 1999 and one of numerous attacks in Madrid.

== See also ==
- 1992 Madrid bombing
- 1993 Madrid bombings
- 2004 Madrid train bombings
- List of ETA attacks
