= 2011 PSOE prime ministerial primary =

- 26 June 2011 (Note: The primary election was left uncontested on 13 June, as a result of Alfredo Pérez Rubalcaba's candidacy being the only one meeting the endorsement requirements.)
- Opinion polls
- Registered: ~218,720
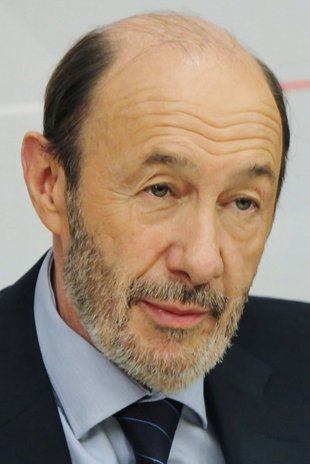
Candidate	Alfredo Pérez Rubalcaba
Popular vote	Uncontested
Previous prime ministerial nominee
José Luis Rodríguez Zapatero (2008)
Elected prime ministerial nominee
Alfredo Pérez Rubalcaba

A primary election was scheduled for Sunday, 26 June 2011, to elect the prime ministerial nominee of the Spanish Socialist Workers' Party (PSOE) for the next Spanish general election, at the time expected for early 2012.

The primary process was triggered following the announcement on 2 April 2011 by PSOE leader José Luis Rodríguez Zapatero that he would not be running as the party's candidate for the post of prime minister of Spain in the next general election, initially scheduled for 2012, against the backdrop of the ongoing financial crisis affecting the country. Deputy prime minister and interior minister, Alfredo Pérez Rubalcaba, and defence minister, Carme Chacón, were widely seen as the most likely contenders for the position.

The PSOE's heavy defeats in the local and regional elections on 22 May 2011 prompted a party crisis, with some sectors demanding an extraordinary congress to be held to replace Zapatero. Chacón announced her withdrawal from the contest in order to allow the party to coalesce around Rubalcaba and prevent internal divisions that could damage both the party and government's standings ahead of the general election. As a result, the primaries were left uncontested and Rubalcaba was proclaimed candidate unopposed on 9 July 2011.

== Background ==
The first experience in the Spanish Socialist Workers' Party (PSOE) to elect a prime ministerial nominee through party primaries was in 1998, when Josep Borrell, a former public works minister, defeated Joaquín Almunia, then incumbent PSOE leader. However, Borrell withdrew his candidacy in 1999 over a tax fraud scandal affecting two former aides, with Almunia then being appointed as candidate unopposed; he would go on to lose the 2000 Spanish general election, which the People's Party (PP) won by a landslide. Another primary process in 2002 saw PSOE leader José Luis Rodríguez Zapatero being elected unopposed, and in 2007, with Zapatero as the incumbent prime minister, no primaries were organized.

The impact of the Great Recession in Spain and the adoption of a harsh austerity agenda had seen the ruling PSOE plummet in popularity, with the party suffering defeats in the 2009 European Parliament and 2010 Catalan elections while lagging behind the opposition PP under Mariano Rajoy in opinion polls. A possible decision by José Luis Rodríguez Zapatero not to seek re-election became the focus of political debate by 2010, with Zapatero himself refusing to publicly confirm or deny the speculation. This would last until 2 April 2011, when he announced his decision not to run for a third term in the next general election, initially scheduled for March 2012. In his speech, Zapatero called for his successor to be elected through a primary election, in order to avoid a situation mirroring Joaquín Almunia's rushed selection in the 1997 party congress, though regional PSOE leaders were not supportive of this procedure. Immediately following this announcement, deputy prime minister and interior minister Alfredo Pérez Rubalcaba and defence minister Carme Chacón were considered as the favourites.

Following the PSOE's heavy defeat in the local and regional elections of 22 May 2011, regional Basque and Extremaduran PSOE leaders, Patxi López and Guillermo Fernández Vara, called for the cancellation of the primaries and the convening of an extraordinary party congress to replace Zapatero and define a new political program. Both Zapatero and the party's deputy secretary-general, José Blanco, rejected this notion and assured that the primary election process would go ahead. Concurrently, Chacón's supporters called for the primaries to be delayed in order for its political effect to "not go down after the summer", whereas several sectors within the party called for a "consensus candidacy" under Rubalcaba while adding pressure on Chacón not to run. Chacón ultimately withdrew on 26 May, confirming that she had intended to run but was stepping back for the sake of "party unity, Zapatero's image and the government's stability". This paved the way for Rubalcaba to become the sole major candidate.

== Overview ==
=== Procedure ===
Following its 2000 congress, the PSOE approved a party regulation governing public offices that included the election of candidates through a closed primary system. Primaries were established as mandatory to elect prime ministerial nominees, except when the party already held the office of prime minister, in which case a primary election would only be held if explicitly requested by a majority of members in the federal committee.

The primary election was organized on the basis of plurality voting. Voting comprised all members of the PSOE—including its regional branches—and the Socialists' Party of Catalonia (PSC). Candidates seeking to run were required to collect the endorsements of either at least 10% of party members (which for the 2011 prime ministerial primary amounted to 21,872 endorsements), the federal committee as a body or a majority of members in the federal executive commission. In the event of only one candidate meeting this requirement, the primaries would be left uncontested with such candidate being elected unopposed.

=== Timetable ===
The key dates of the primary election procedure are listed below (all times are CET):

- 28 May: Official announcement of the primary election; start of endorsement collection and candidacy submission periods.
- 13 June: End of endorsement collection and candidacy submission periods at 12 pm.
- 14 June: Endorsement verification.
- 15 June: Provisional proclamation of primary candidates.
- 18 June: Definitive proclamation of primary candidates.
- 19 June: Official start of internal information campaign.
- 25 June: Last day of internal information campaign.
- 26 June: Primary election (polling stations open at 10 am and close at 8 pm).
- 2 July: Proclamation of prime ministerial nominee.

== Candidates ==
Candidate	Notable positions	Announced	Ref.
=== Qualified ===
Candidates who met endorsement requirements and qualified to contest the primary election.
Alfredo Pérez Rubalcaba (age 59)	First Deputy Prime Minister of Spain (since 2010); Spokesperson of the Government of Spain (1993–1996 and since 2010); Member of the Congress of Deputies for Cádiz (since 2008); Member of the PSOE Executive Commission (since 2008); Minister of the Interior of Spain (since 2006); Member of the Congress of Deputies for Cantabria (2004–2008); Spokesperson of the Socialist Parliamentary Group of the Congress (2004–2006); Member of the Congress of Deputies for Madrid (1996–2004); Secretary of Communication of the PSOE (1997–2000); Minister of the Presidency of Spain (1993–1996); Member of the Congress of Deputies for Toledo (1993–1996); Minister of Education and Science of Spain (1992–1993); Secretary of State of Education of Spain (1988–1992); Secretary-General for Education of Spain (1986–1988); Director-General for University Education of Spain (1985–1986)	28 May 2011	
=== Failed to qualify ===
Candidates who announced an intention to run, but failed to qualify due to not meeting endorsement requirements.
José Carlos Carmona (age 48)	None	29 May 2011	
Luis Ángel Hierro (age 48)	Member of the Congress of Deputies for Seville (2004–2007)	29 May 2011	
Julián Pastor (age 52)	None	29 May 2011	
Jorge Martínez Peñaranda (age 33)	None	31 May 2011	
Manuel Pérez (age 63)	None	31 May 2011	
Enrique García López (age 62)	None	1 June 2011	
David González Sánchez (age 33)	None	1 June 2011	
Juan María Hernández Pérez (age 38)	None	1 June 2011	
Modesto Durán López (age unknown)	None	13 June 2011	

=== Declined ===
The individuals in this section were the subject of speculation about their possible candidacy, but publicly denied or recanted interest in running:

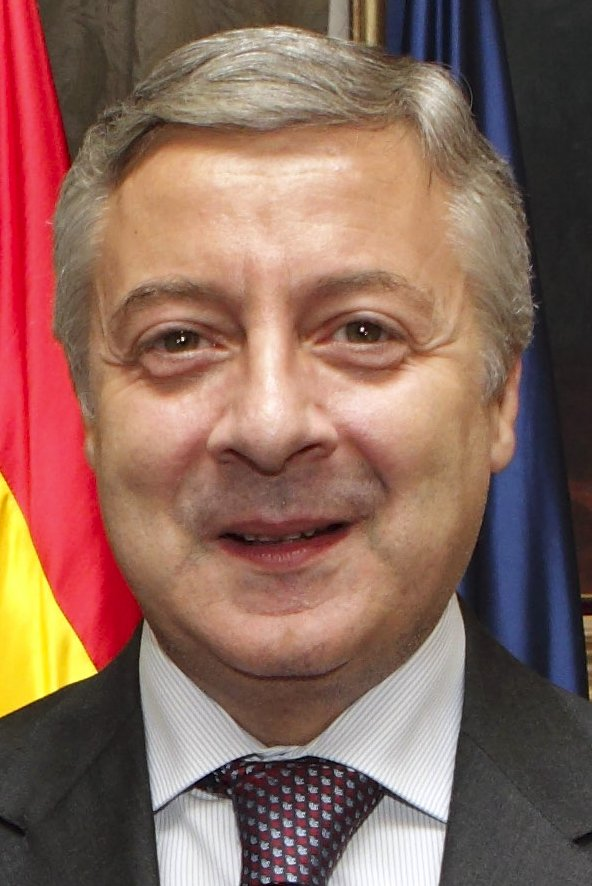
José Blanco

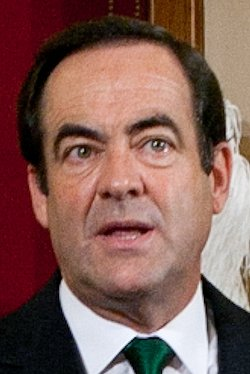
José Bono

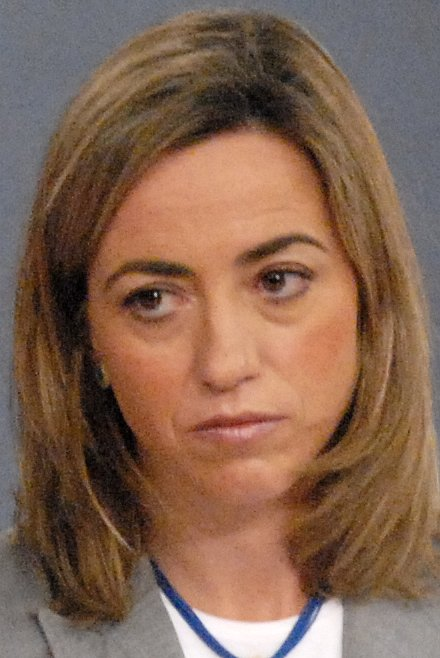
Carme Chacón

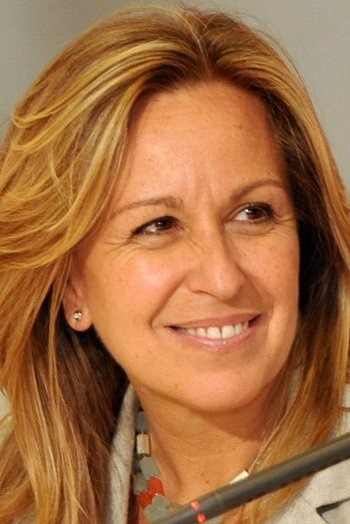
Trinidad Jiménez

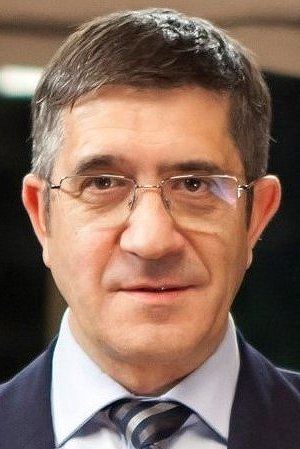
Patxi López

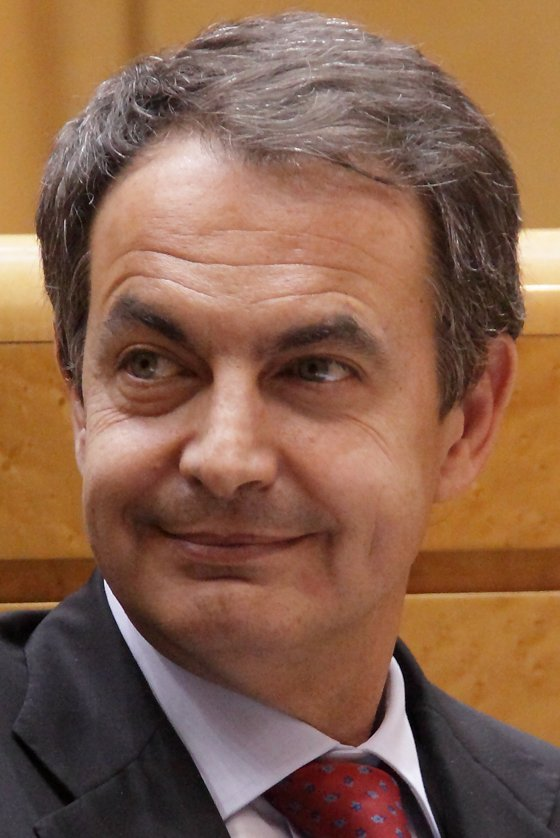
José Luis Rodríguez Zapatero

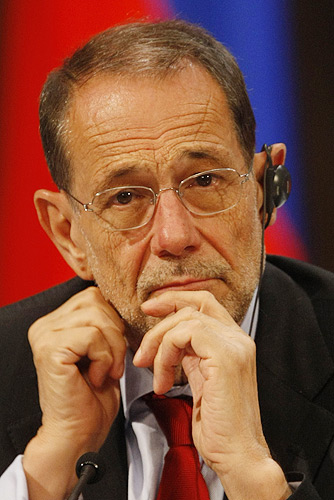
Javier Solana
- José Blanco (age 49) — Deputy Secretary-General of the PSOE (since 2008); Member of the Congress of Deputies for Lugo (since 1996); Spokesperson of the Government of Spain (2011); Minister of Development of Spain (2009–2011); Secretary of Organization of the PSOE (2000–2008); City Councillor of Palas de Rei (1991–1999); Senator for Lugo (1989–1996).
- Jose Bono (age 60) — President of the Congress of Deputies (since 2008); Member of the Congress of Deputies for Toledo (since 2008); President of the PSCM–PSOE (1990–1997 and since 2004); Minister of Defence of Spain (2004–2006); Member of the Cortes of Castilla–La Mancha for Toledo (1987–2004); President of the Regional Government of Castilla–La Mancha (1983–2004); Member of the PSOE Executive Commission (1990–2000); Secretary-General of the PSCM–PSOE (1988–1990); Member of the Cortes of Castilla–La Mancha for Albacete (1983–1987); Member of the Congress of Deputies for Albacete (1979–1983); Fourth Secretary of the Congress of Deputies (1979–1982).
- Carme Chacón (age 40) — Minister of Defence of Spain (since 2008); Member of the PSOE Executive Commission (since 2008); Member of the Congress of Deputies for Barcelona (since 2000); Minister of Housing of Spain (2007–2008); Secretary of Culture of the PSOE (2004–2008); First Vice President of the Congress of Deputies (2004–2007); Secretary of Education, Universities, Culture and Research of the PSOE (2000–2004); First Deputy Mayor of Esplugues de Llobregat (1999–2003); City Councillor of Esplugues de Llobregat (1999–2003).
- Trinidad Jiménez (age 49) — Minister of Foreign Affairs and Cooperation of Spain (since 2010); Minister of Health and Social Policy of Spain (2009–2010); Secretary of State for Ibero-America (2006–2009); Member of the Congress of Deputies for Madrid (2008); Secretary of International Policy of the PSOE (2004–2007); Spokesperson of the Socialist Group in Madrid (2003–2006); City Councillor of Madrid (2003–2006); Secretary of International Relations of the PSOE (2000–2003).
- Patxi López (age 51) — Lehendakari (since 2009); Secretary-General of the PSE–EE (PSOE) (since 2002); Member of the Basque Parliament for Biscay (since 1991); Secretary-General of the PSE–EE (PSOE) in Biscay (1997–2002); Secretary of Organization of the PSE–EE (PSOE) (1991–1995); Member of the Congress of Deputies for Biscay (1987–1989); Secretary-General of the JSE–EGAZ (1985–1988).
- José Luis Rodríguez Zapatero (age 50) — Prime Minister of Spain (since 2004); Member of the Congress of Deputies for Madrid (since 2004); Secretary-General of the PSOE (since 2000); President pro tempore of the Council of the European Union (2010); Leader of the Opposition of Spain (2000–2004); Member of the Congress of Deputies for León (1986–2004); Member of the PSOE Executive Commission (1997–2000); Secretary-General of the PSOE in the province of León (1988–2000).
- Javier Solana (age 68) — High Representative for Common Foreign and Security Policy (1999–2009); Secretary-General of the Council of the European Union (1999–2009); Secretary-General of the Western European Union (1999–2009); Secretary-General of NATO (1995–1999); Member of the PSOE Executive Commission (1981–1984 and 1994–1997); Minister of Foreign Affairs of Spain (1992–1995); Member of the Congress of Deputies for Madrid (1977–1995); Minister of Education and Science of Spain (1988–1992); Spokesperson of the Government of Spain (1985–1988); Minister of Culture of Spain (1982–1988); Secretary of Studies and Programs of the PSOE (1979–1981); Secretary of Press and Information of the PSOE (1976–1979).

== Endorsements ==
Rubalcaba secured the endorsement of the federal committee on 28 May, whereas all the other nine announced candidates failed to meet the threshold in time, garnering a total 14 "spontaneous" endorsements which were regarded as invalid due to them being sent via email or fax. Julián Pastor had previously claimed to have 8,500 endorsements; David González reported having "4,000 or 5,000" endorsements but acknowledged being unable to verify whether they belonged to party members because he was not able to access the official census; whereas José Carlos Carmona was said to have about 4,700.

Summary of candidate endorsement results
Candidate	Party members			Federal committee		
Candidate	Count	% T	% V	Count	% T	% V
Alfredo Pérez Rubalcaba	Not applicable			Unanimity		
José Carlos Carmona	0	0.00	0.00	Not applicable		
Modesto Durán López	0	0.00	0.00	Not applicable		
Enrique García López	0	0.00	0.00	Not applicable		
David González Sánchez	0	0.00	0.00	Not applicable		
Juan María Hernández Pérez	0	0.00	0.00	Not applicable		
Luis Ángel Hierro	0	0.00	0.00	Not applicable		
Jorge Martínez Peñaranda	0	0.00	0.00	Not applicable		
Manuel Pérez	0	0.00	0.00	Not applicable		
Julián Pastor	0	0.00	0.00	Not applicable		
Total	0			246		
Valid endorsements	0	0.00		246	100.00	
Not endorsing	~218,720	100.00		0	0.00	
Total members	~218,720			246		

== Opinion polls ==
Poll results are listed in the tables below in reverse chronological order, showing the most recent first, and using the date the survey's fieldwork was done, as opposed to the date of publication. If such date is unknown, the date of publication is given instead. The highest percentage figure in each polling survey is displayed in bold, and the background shaded in the candidate's colour. In the instance of a tie, the figures with the highest percentages are shaded. Polls show data gathered among PSOE voters/supporters as well as Spanish voters as a whole, but not among party members, who were the ones ultimately entitled to vote in the primary election.

=== PSOE voters ===
Polling firm/Commissioner	Fieldwork date	Sample size							Other /None	Question	Lead
Polling firm/Commissioner	Fieldwork date	Sample size	Zapatero (Inc.)	Bono	Chacón	Rubalcaba	Blanco	Fernández de la Vega	Other /None	Question	Lead
Ikerfel/ABC	11 Apr 2011	?	–	–	21.0	**32.0**	–	–	–	–	11.0
Metroscopia/El País	30–31 Mar 2011	1,004	10.0	14.0	15.0	**52.0**	–	–	5.0	4.0	37.0
Sigma Dos/El Mundo	7–9 Mar 2011	1,000	12.9	–	–	**44.8**	–	–	–	–	31.9
Opina/Cadena SER	12–13 Jan 2011	1,000	26.7	12.6	11.8	**27.4**	8.3	–	–	13.0	0.7
Sigma Dos/El Mundo	23–28 Dec 2010	1,000	–	13.8	9.7	**33.4**	–	–	–	–	19.6
Opina/Cadena SER	28–29 Oct 2010	1,000	**36.0**	13.0	12.4	20.5	9.7	–	–	8.4	15.5
Metroscopia/El País	2 Jun 2010	506	**35.0**	4.0	–	8.0	3.0	5.0	9.0	38.0	27.0
Noxa/La Vanguardia	28–29 Dec 2009	807	–	8.8	8.1	**11.0**	–	–	–	–	2.2
Sigma Dos/El Mundo	23–29 Dec 2009	1,000	–	15.5	–	**19.8**	–	–	–	–	4.3

=== Spanish voters ===
Polling firm/Commissioner	Fieldwork date	Sample size									Other /None	Question	Lead
Polling firm/Commissioner	Fieldwork date	Sample size	Zapatero (Inc.)	Bono	Chacón	Rubalcaba	Blanco	Solana	López	Fernández de la Vega	Other /None	Question	Lead
Ikerfel/Vocento	4–22 Apr 2011	45,635	–	11.3	18.8	**34.9**	2.8	–	–	–	3.1	29.1	16.1
NC Report/La Razón	3 Apr 2011	?	–	21.2	7.3	**25.2**	–	5.2	–	–	46.3		4.0
TNS Demoscopia/Antena 3	2 Apr 2011	?	–	2.3	10.4	**40.5**	1.1	–	–	–	3.3	42.4	30.1
Invymark/laSexta	2 Apr 2011	?	–	–	24.8	**62.1**	–	–	–	–	13.1		37.3
Invymark/laSexta	2 Apr 2011	?	–	5.9	11.3	**44.0**	1.5	–	–	–	16.3	7.5	32.7
Metroscopia/El País	30–31 Mar 2011	1,004	8.0	16.0	17.0	**42.0**	–	–	–	–	10.0	7.0	25.0
NC Report/La Razón	14 Mar 2011	?	–	20.3	5.7	**23.5**	–	6.4	–	–	44.1		3.2
Sigma Dos/El Mundo	7–9 Mar 2011	1,000	7.3	12.6	10.1	**26.9**	–	11.9	–	–	–	–	14.3
Opina/Cadena SER	12–13 Jan 2011	1,000	16.7	18.0	14.6	**30.3**	8.8	–	–	–	–	11.5	12.3
NC Report/La Razón	22–24 Dec 2010	1,000	–	29.5	12.2	**32.7**	9.8	–	–	–	–	–	3.2
Opina/Cadena SER	28–29 Oct 2010	1,000	21.3	19.7	13.7	**24.5**	10.3	–	–	–	–	10.4	3.2
NC Report/La Razón	17 Oct 2010	?	–	**27.9**	15.9	24.5	16.2	9.0	6.5	–	–	–	3.4
Opina/Cadena SER	7–8 Oct 2010	1,000	**22.1**	20.6	14.2	20.0	11.1	–	–	–	–	12.0	1.5
Metroscopia/El País	2 Jun 2010	506	**21.0**	3.0	–	6.0	2.0	–	–	2.0	10.0	56.0	15.0
Noxa/La Vanguardia	28–29 Dec 2009	807	–	**11.0**	5.0	7.0	3.0	–	–	4.0	32.0	38.0	4.0
Sigma Dos/El Mundo	23–29 Dec 2009	1,000	–	**17.9**	6.7	15.5	3.2	–	–	9.2	–	–	2.4

== Aftermath ==
The lack of any significant challenger following the PSOE's rally around Rubalcaba meant that the primary process was left uncontested. As a result, the federal committee ratified Alfredo Pérez Rubalcaba as the party's prime ministerial candidate on 9 July 2011. Rubalcaba subsequently vacated all of his cabinet posts in order to focus on his candidacy.

== Bibliography ==
- PSOE Federal Congress (6 July 2008). "Normativa reguladora de los Cargos Públicos" (in Spanish). Spanish Socialist Workers' Party. Archived from the original on 25 August 2010.
- PSOE Federal Committee (28 May 2011). "Procedimiento para la elección de candidato o candidata a la presidencia del Gobierno de España" (PDF) (in Spanish). Spanish Socialist Workers' Party.
- Pascual Bueno, Ernesto M. (2016). Selección de Líderes y Candidatos a la Presidencia del Gobierno (1976-2016). "El jardín secreto del PSOE" (PDF) (PhD) (in Spanish). Barcelona: Universidad Autónoma de Barcelona.
