= 2002 PSOE prime ministerial primary =

- 6 October 2002 (Note: The primary election was left uncontested on 25 September, as a result of José Luis Rodríguez Zapatero's candidacy being the only one fielded.)
- Opinion polls
- Registered: ~234,000
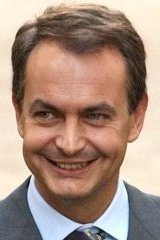
Candidate	José Luis Rodríguez Zapatero
Popular vote	Uncontested
Previous prime ministerial nominee
Joaquín Almunia (2000)
Elected prime ministerial nominee
José Luis Rodríguez Zapatero

A primary election was scheduled for Sunday, 6 October 2002, to elect the prime ministerial nominee of the Spanish Socialist Workers' Party (PSOE) for the 2004 Spanish general election.

The introduction of the primary system to elect the PSOE nominee for the office of prime minister of Spain had been first tested in 1998 and introduced in the party's statutes following the 2000 federal party congress, when José Luis Rodríguez Zapatero was elected as new secretary-general. Primaries for the 2004 general election were first announced by Zapatero during a party event on 26 April 2001 and confirmed through new regulations approved in a party political conference in July, which also set new endorsement requirements for candidates intending to run. The PSOE leadership announced the formal start of the process in September 2002.

Zapatero was the only candidate fielded, securing the nomination by garnering all three ways of endorsement requirements available: support from both the executive and federal committees and the signatures of 67,940 party members, almost three times the required threshold. As a result, he was ratified as the party's prime ministerial nominee unopposed on 27 October 2002, with the primaries being left uncontested.

== Background ==
The first experience in the Spanish Socialist Workers' Party (PSOE) to elect a prime ministerial nominee through party primaries was in 1998, when Josep Borrell, a former public works minister, defeated Joaquín Almunia, then incumbent PSOE leader.

Borrell withdrew his candidacy in 1999 over a tax fraud scandal affecting two former aides, with Almunia then being appointed as candidate unopposed; he would go on to lose the 2000 Spanish general election, which the People's Party (PP) won by a landslide. This led to Almunia's resignation, prompting a party congress in July 2000 in which José Luis Rodríguez Zapatero, a deputy for León, emerged as the party's new secretary-general. The system to select the party's nominee to the post of prime minister was discussed in the aftermath of the 2000 general election, but internal divisions led to a final decision being postponed until the party congress or later.

During a party event on 26 April 2001, Zapatero announced that the PSOE prime ministerial candidate would be "democratically elected" and hinted at a primary election being held at some point, while remembering the Almunia–Borrell precedent and joking that "primaries give surprises". A political conference held in July 2001 saw the introduction in the party's statutes of the primary system for public and institutional offices.

The start of the primary process was announced by party president Manuel Chaves on 1 September 2002, after consultations with regional party leaders, with the timetable being approved in a federal committee meeting on 6 September. While Zapatero was widely predicted to be the sole candidate, the PSOE was intent on following due process to emphasize the democratic nature of the procedure, at a time when the ruling PP did not have successor for José María Aznar as prime ministerial nominee (who was expected to be determined by Aznar himself, amid criticism of "finger-pointing" or dedazo, as it was known in Spanish).

== Overview ==
=== Procedure ===
Following its 2000 congress, the PSOE approved a party regulation governing public offices that included the election of candidates through a closed primary system. Primaries were established as mandatory to elect prime ministerial nominees, except when the party already held the office of prime minister, in which case a primary election would only be held if explicitly requested by a majority of members in the federal committee.

The primary election was organized on the basis of plurality voting. Voting comprised all members of the PSOE—including its regional branches—and the Socialists' Party of Catalonia (PSC). Candidates seeking to run were required to collect the endorsements of either at least 10% of party members (which for the 2002 prime ministerial primary amounted to 23,400 endorsements), the federal committee as a body or a majority of members in the federal executive commission. In the event of only one candidate meeting this requirement, the primaries would be left uncontested with such candidate being elected unopposed.

=== Timetable ===
The key dates of the primary election procedure are listed below (all times are CET):

- 6 September: Official announcement of the primary election; start of endorsement collection and candidacy submission periods.
- 25 September: End of endorsement collection and candidacy submission periods at 3 pm.
- 29 September: Official start of internal information campaign.
- 5 October: Last day of internal information campaign.
- 6 October: Primary election.

== Candidates ==
Candidate	Notable positions	Announced	Ref.
=== Qualified ===
Candidates who met endorsement requirements and qualified to contest the primary election.
José Luis Rodríguez Zapatero (age 42)	Secretary-General of the PSOE (since 2000); Leader of the Opposition of Spain (since 2000); Member of the Congress of Deputies for León (since 1986); Member of the PSOE Executive Commission (1997–2000); Secretary-General of the PSOE in the province of León (1988–2000)	12 September 2002	

== Endorsements ==
Zapatero sought to meet all three endorsement requirements, which he achieved by the deadline of 25 September.

Summary of candidate endorsement results
Candidate	Party members			Executive commission			Federal committee		
Candidate	Count	% T	% V	Count	% T	% V	Count	% T	% V
José Luis Rodríguez Zapatero	67,940	29.03	100.00	Unanimity			Unanimity		
Total	67,940			25			249		
Valid endorsements	67,940	29.03		25	100.00		249	100.00	
Not endorsing	~166,060	70.97		0	0.00		0	0.00	
Total members	~234,000			25			249		

== Opinion polls ==
Poll results are listed in the tables below in reverse chronological order, showing the most recent first, and using the date the survey's fieldwork was done, as opposed to the date of publication. If such date is unknown, the date of publication is given instead. The highest percentage figure in each polling survey is displayed in bold, and the background shaded in the candidate's colour. In the instance of a tie, the figures with the highest percentages are shaded. Polls show data gathered among PSOE voters/supporters as well as Spanish voters as a whole, but not among party members, who were the ones ultimately entitled to vote in the primary election.

=== PSOE voters ===
Polling firm/Commissioner	Fieldwork date	Sample size											Other /None	Question	Lead
Polling firm/Commissioner	Fieldwork date	Sample size	Zapatero (Inc.)	Almunia	González	Bono	Solana	Borrell	Chaves	Díez	Guerra	Maragall	Other /None	Question	Lead
ASEP	30 Jun–5 Jul 2003 (Note: Conducted after the primary election.)	1,212	**60.6**	–	16.9	6.3	2.5	–	–	–	–	–	1.2	12.6	43.7
ASEP	10–15 Apr 2000	1,210	–	–	**35.4**	9.1	14.9	4.1	8.2	2.5	1.7	3.6	3.2	17.3	20.5
Demoscopia/El País	26 May–1 Jun 1999	?	–	10.0	**45.0**	16.0	–	–	5.0	–	–	5.0	19.0		29.0

=== Spanish voters ===
Polling firm/Commissioner	Fieldwork date	Sample size										Other /None	Question	Lead
Polling firm/Commissioner	Fieldwork date	Sample size	Zapatero (Inc.)	González	Bono	Borrell	Chaves	Díez	Guerra	Maragall	Solana	Other /None	Question	Lead
ASEP	30 Jun–5 Jul 2003	1,212	**38.2**	9.6	6.4	4.4	–	–	–	–	–	2.0	39.4	28.6
ASEP	10–15 Apr 2000	1,210	–	**16.9**	6.2	7.0	4.3	2.6	1.2	3.9	5.0	3.1	49.7	9.9

== Bibliography ==
- PSOE Federal Congress (6 July 2008). "Normativa reguladora de los Cargos Públicos" (in Spanish). Spanish Socialist Workers' Party. Archived from the original on 25 August 2010.
- Pascual Bueno, Ernesto M. (2016). Selección de Líderes y Candidatos a la Presidencia del Gobierno (1976-2016). "El jardín secreto del PSOE" (PDF) (PhD) (in Spanish). Barcelona: Universidad Autónoma de Barcelona.
