= 2000 PSOE federal party congress =

- 21−23 July 2000

998 delegates in the Federal Congress Plurality of delegates needed to win
- Turnout: Secretary-General: 995 (99.7%); Executive: 964 (96.6%); Committee: 950 (95.2%)
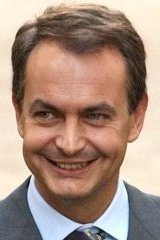

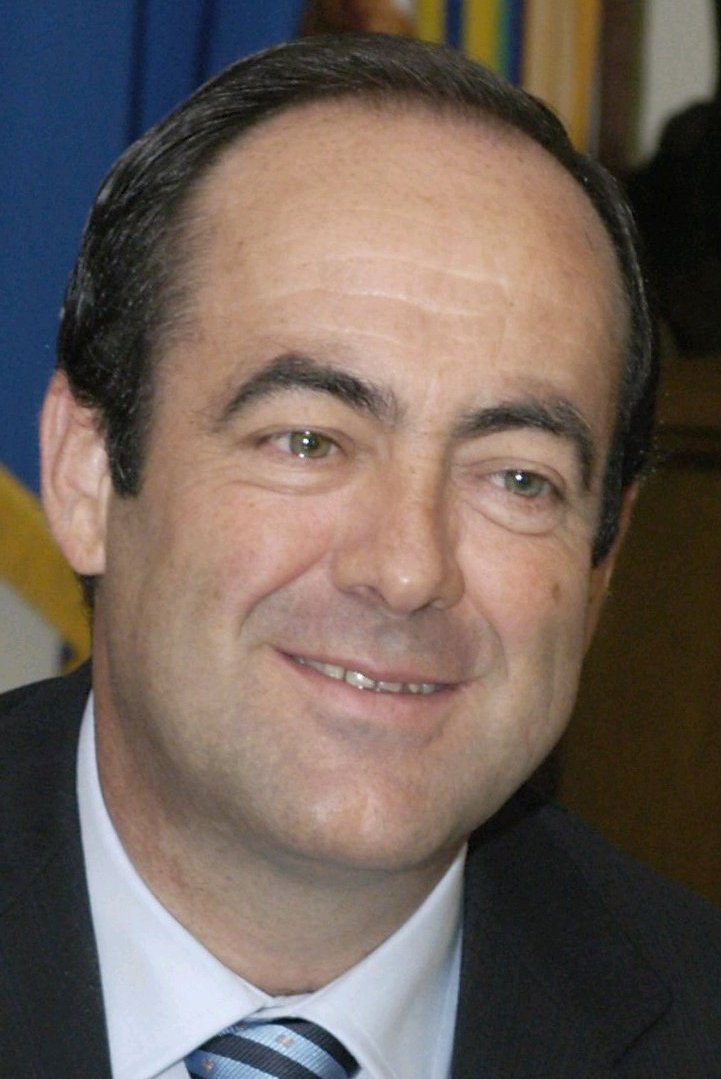

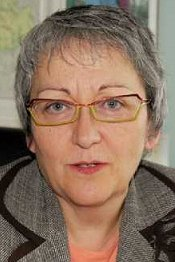

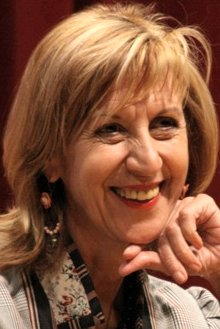

Candidate	José Luis Rodríguez Zapatero	José Bono	Matilde Fernández
Delegate vote	414 (41.6%)	405 (40.7%)	109 (11.0%)
Executive	865 (90.2%)	Eliminated	Eliminated
Committee	856 (90.7%)	Eliminated	Eliminated
Candidate	Rosa Díez	Blank ballots
Delegate vote	65 (6.5%)	2 (0.2%)
Executive	Eliminated	94 (9.8%)
Committee	Eliminated	88 (9.3%)
Party leader before election
Caretaker commission headed by Manuel Chaves
Party leader after election
José Luis Rodríguez Zapatero

The Spanish Socialist Workers' Party (PSOE) held its 35th federal congress in Madrid from 21 to 23 July 2000, to renovate its governing bodies—including the post of secretary-general, which amounted to that of party leader—and establish the party platform and policy until the next congress. It was called following the PSOE's defeat in the 2000 general election and the subsequent resignation of then secretary-general, Joaquín Almunia. A caretaker commission under Andalusian president Manuel Chaves was appointed to organize the congress and manage the party in the interim.

The main issue dominating the congress was the renovation of the party, following 23 years of leadership under Felipe González—who had also been prime minister of Spain between 1982 and 1996—and Alfonso Guerra as his deputy. While González had stepped down in the previous congress in 1997, his influence in the party apparatus, together with that of the powerful PSOE regional leaders, helped elect Almunia as new leader. A primary election in 1998 saw the party's grassroots electing Josep Borrell as the PSOE's prime ministerial nominee, sparking a duumvirate with Almunia which was only resolved after Borrell's withdrawal in 1999.

In the lead up to the congress, party factions coalesced around four main candidates in the leadership contest: president of Castilla–La Mancha, José Bono, who represented positions in the Christian left; José Luis Rodríguez Zapatero, a deputy for León representing a Blairism-inspired social liberalism (a "New Way"); the leader of the PSOE delegation in the European Parliament, Rosa Díez, who advocated for a participatory social democracy; and former social affairs minister Matilde Fernández, who represented democratic socialist views and was backed by both Guerra's (guerristas) and Borrell's (borrellistas) supporters. As a result, it became the first competitive PSOE congress since 1979.

Under a plurality voting system, Zapatero unexpectedly won the ballot to initial favourite Bono by nine votes. Fernández and Díez placed a distant third and fourth places. Zapatero's victory was attributed in part to tactical voting from Díez's supporters and some guerristas who, inspired by Zapatero's speech during the congress, decided their support in the last minute in an effort to prevent Bono from becoming new party leader. Zapatero would subsequently win the 2004 Spanish general election and become prime minister of Spain.

== Background ==
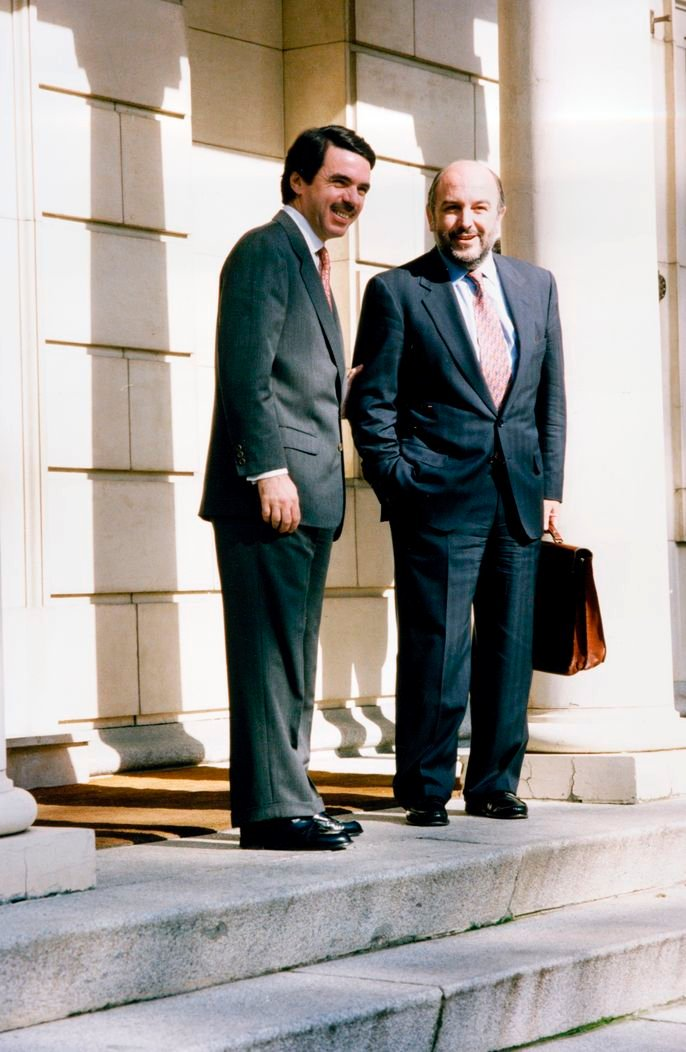
The congress was triggered by Joaquín Almunia's resignation as PSOE leader, following José María Aznar's landslide victory in the 2000 Spanish general election (both men pictured in 1997).

Since the early 1990s, the Spanish Socialist Workers' Party (PSOE) had been embroiled in an internal power and ideological struggle between those following the doctrine of its deputy secretary-general, Alfonso Guerra (dubbed as guerristas), and those supporting the party's renovation, headed by party leader Felipe González (referred to as renovadores, Spanish for "renovators"); this had been publicly revealed in the 1994 party congress, which resulted in Guerra losing control of the party apparatus to the renovator faction. The 1996 Spanish general election saw the PSOE lose the national government for the first time since 1982, with José María Aznar of the People's Party (PP) becoming new prime minister through an alliance with peripheral nationalist parties, in what would be coined as the "Majestic Pact".

A new party congress was called for June 1997 in order to define the PSOE's new role in opposition, but Guerra's continuity as deputy leader became the political focus and threatened party unity. In an attempt to end the struggle and force a full party renovation, González announced his surprise withdrawal from frontline politics. Joaquín Almunia was elected as new PSOE secretary-general, but the process was perceived as rushed, heavily influenced by the party's elites—the powerful regional leaders (colloquially referred to as barones, Spanish for "barons") as well as González himself—while other potential candidates, such as former public works minister Josep Borrell, were sidelined.

Borrell contested and unexpectedly won the party's prime ministerial primaries in April 1998, originally intended by Almunia as a way to legitimize his leadership. A "bicephaly" ( duumvirate) situation ensued in which both of them clashed for months on their roles and the party's platform, with this only ending following Borrell's withdrawal in May 1999 and the proclamation of Almunia as nominee in July.

The 2000 general election saw a landslide victory for the ruling PP and the PSOE being reduced to its worst result since 1979. This prompted Almunia to announce his immediate resignation as PSOE leader, triggering a leadership contest through an ordinary party congress which was set to be held on 21−23 July 2000. During his assessment of the election results, Almunia noted that one of the main reasons for the defeat was the party's failure to undertake a complete renovation after being ousted from power in 1996. PSOE regional leaders negotiated the appointment of a caretaker commission—the Political Commission—under Andalusian president Manuel Chaves, to organize the congress, manage the party in the interim and prevent a power vacuum. The goal was for a congress that served as "the starting point for a profound change" in the party, while deviating from the previous practice of reaching elite pacts that accommodated the various PSOE families through the influence of the regional leaders.

== Overview ==
=== Role ===
The Federal Congress was the highest decision-making body of the PSOE, having the ability to define the party platform and policy, amend its statutes and internal regulations and elect its federal governing bodies, which included the Executive Commission—a board of directors responsible for the day-to-day management of the party under the coordination of a secretary-general, which was the party leader—and 49 members in the Federal Committee (an assembly of party notables and elected representatives, which was the PSOE's highest body between congresses).

Depending on whether a congress was held following the natural end of its term or due to any other exceptional circumstances, it could be of either ordinary or extraordinary nature. Ordinary PSOE congresses were to be held every three or four years and called at least four months in advance, whereas extraordinary congresses—which allowed to fill vacancies affecting the post of secretary-general or half plus one of the members of the federal executive commission—could be called 40 days in advance, but they did not allow to define the party's platform and the resulting elected officials were limited to serve out what remained of the previous congress' original term until the next ordinary one.

=== Procedure ===
Congress delegates were elected by party members of the corresponding territorial area and in full enjoyment of their political rights, using closed list proportional representation. In a first stage of the process, local assemblies were to be held to elect representatives to the respective provincial, regional and island conventions; then, these conventions would elect the party delegates who were to attend the federal congress.

The election of the secretary-general was on the basis of indirect suffrage through the delegates. The system and procedure to elect the new party leadership were a subject of discussion until the congress itself, occasionally together with the selection procedure for prime ministerial nominees and the use of the primary election system. A proposal establishing a split-vote was approved and adopted: a first ballot was to elect the person occupying the post of secretary-general under plurality voting, then a second vote was to be held on the composition of the new leader's proposed executive commission. Candidates seeking to run were required to collect the endorsements of at least 10% of congress delegates, a requirement introduced to prevent spontaneous, phony candidacies. Concurrently, candidates seeking to access the party resources for their campaigns were required to previously secure the endorsement of at least 10% of the members in the Federal Committee.

The selection of the candidate for prime minister through primaries was postponed until after the congress.

=== Timetable ===
The key dates of the congress process are listed below (all times are CET), as approved by the Political Commission in a meeting on 10 April 2000:

- 22 March: Official announcement of the congress.
- 10 April: Approval of the congress' timetable.
- 2 June: Start of local assemblies to elect representatives to the provincial, regional and island conventions.
- 11 June: Deadline for local assemblies to be held.
- 12 June: Start of provincial, regional and island conventions to elect party delegates.
- 25 June: Deadline for provincial, regional and island conventions to be held.
- 21 July: Start of federal congress.
- 22 July: Election of the secretary-general.
- 23 July: Election of party governing bodies; end of federal congress.

== Candidates ==
Candidate	Notable positions	Announced	Ref.
=== Qualified ===
Candidates who met endorsement requirements and qualified to contest the party congress.
Rosa Díez (age 48)	President of the PSOE Delegation in the European Parliament (since 1999); Member of the European Parliament for Spain (since 1999); Member of the Basque Parliament for Biscay (1990–1999); Minister of Trade, Consumer Affairs and Tourism of the Basque Country (1991–1998); City Councillor of Güeñes (1987–1991); Member of the Basque Parliament for Álava (1987–1990); Second Vice President of the General Assembly of Biscay (1983–1987); Member of the General Assembly of Biscay for Encartaciones (1983–1987); Member of the General Assembly of Biscay for Valmaseda (1979–1983)	4 May 2000	
Matilde Fernández (age 50)	City Councillor of Madrid (since 1999); President of the PSC–PSOE (since 1997); Member of the Congress of Deputies for Cantabria (1989–2000); Member of the PSOE Executive Commission (1984–1997); Minister of Social Affairs of Spain (1988–1993)	27 May 2000	
José Bono (age 49)	Member of the PSOE Executive Commission (since 1990); Member of the Cortes of Castilla–La Mancha for Toledo (since 1987); President of the Regional Government of Castilla–La Mancha (since 1983); President of the PSCM–PSOE (1990–1997); Secretary-General of the PSCM–PSOE (1988–1990); Member of the Cortes of Castilla–La Mancha for Albacete (1983–1987); Member of the Congress of Deputies for Albacete (1979–1983); Fourth Secretary of the Congress of Deputies (1979–1982)	17 June 2000	
José Luis Rodríguez Zapatero (age 39)	Member of the PSOE Executive Commission (since 1997); Secretary-General of the PSOE in the province of León (since 1988); Member of the Congress of Deputies for León (since 1986)	25 June 2000	

=== Declined ===
The individuals in this section were the subject of speculation about their possible candidacy, but publicly denied or recanted interest in running:

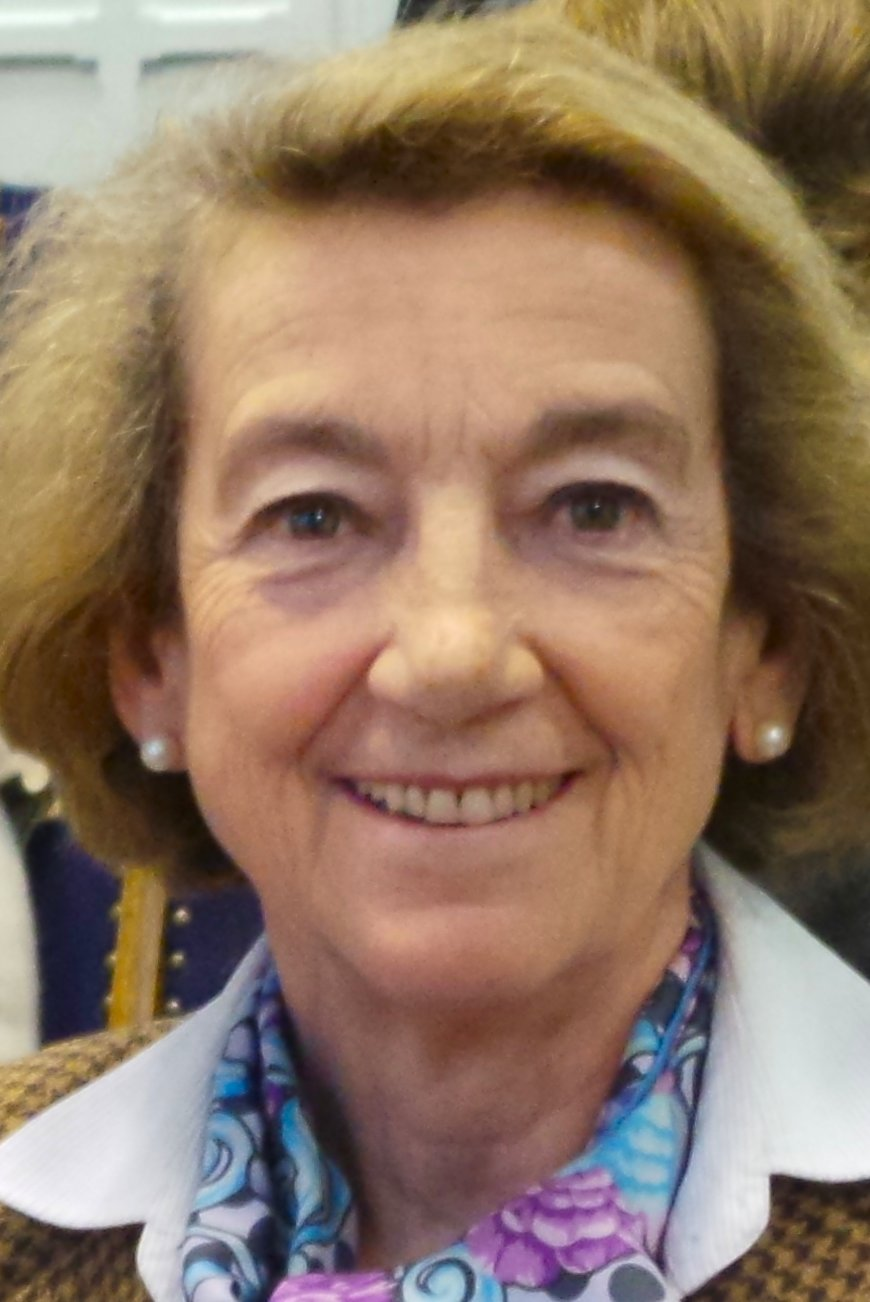
Cristina Alberdi

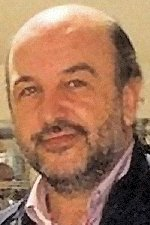
Joaquín Almunia

Juan Alberto Belloch

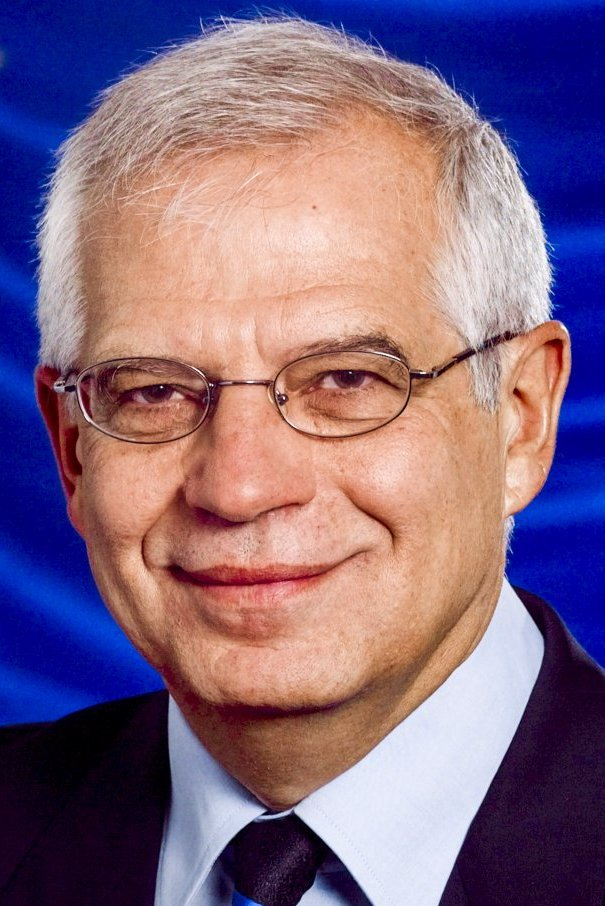
Josep Borrell
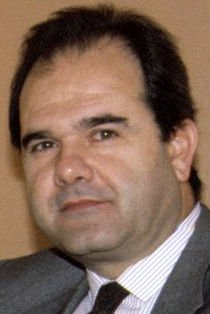
Manuel Chaves

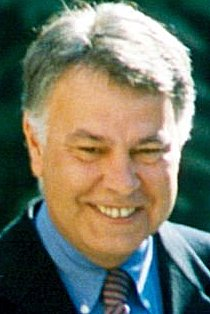
Felipe González

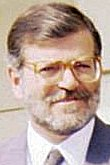
Juan Carlos Rodríguez Ibarra

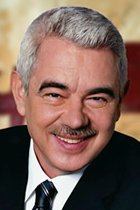
Pasqual Maragall
- Cristina Alberdi (age 54) — Member of the Congress of Deputies for Madrid (since 2000); President of the FSM–PSOE (since 1997); Member of the Congress of Deputies for Málaga (1996–2000); Minister of Social Affairs of Spain (1993–1996).
- Joaquín Almunia (age 52) — Member of the Congress of Deputies for Madrid (since 1979); Leader of the Opposition of Spain (1997–1998 and 1999–2000); Secretary-General of the PSOE (1997–2000); Spokesperson of the Socialist Group of the Congress (1994–1997); Secretary of Studies and Programs of the PSOE (1981–1984 and 1994–1997); Minister of Public Administrations of Spain (1986–1991); Minister of Labour and Social Security of Spain (1982–1986); Secretary of Trade Union Policy of the PSOE (1979–1981).
- Juan Alberto Belloch (age 50) — Senator for Zaragoza (since 2000); Spokesperson of the Socialist Group in the City Council of Zaragoza (since 1999); City Councillor of Zaragoza (since 1999); President of the PSOE–Aragon (since 1997); Member of the Congress of Deputies for Zaragoza (1996–2000); Ministry of Justice and Interior of Spain (1994–1996); Ministry of Justice of Spain (1993–1994); Member of the General Council of the Judiciary (1990–1993); President of the Provincial Court of Biscay (1988–1990).
- Josep Borrell (age 53) — Member of the Congress of Deputies for Barcelona (since 1986); Member of the PSOE Executive Commission (1997–2000); Leader of the Opposition of Spain (1998–1999); Spokesperson of the Socialist Group of the Congress (1998–1999); Minister of Public Works, Transport and Environment of Spain (1993–1996); Minister of Public Works and Urbanism of Spain (1991–1993); Secretary of State of Finance of Spain (1984–1991); Secretary-General of Budget and Public Expenditure of Spain (1982–1984); City Councillor of Majadahonda (1979–1983).
- Manuel Chaves (age 55) — President of the PSOE Political Commission (since 2000); Secretary-General of the PSOE–A (since 1994); President of the Regional Government of Andalusia (since 1990); Member of the Parliament of Andalusia for Cádiz (since 1990); Member of the PSOE Executive Commission (1981–1984 and since 1990); Minister of Labour and Social Security of Spain (1986–1990); Member of the Congress of Deputies for Cádiz (1977–1990); Secretary of Economy of the PSOE (1984–1988).
- Felipe González (age 58) – Member of the Congress of Deputies for Seville (since 2000); Member of the Congress of Deputies for Madrid (1977–2000); Leader of the Opposition of Spain (1996–1997); Secretary-General of the PSOE (1974–1979 and 1979–1997); Prime Minister of Spain (1982–1996); President pro tempore of the Council of the European Union (1989 and 1995); Spokesperson of the Congress Socialist Parliamentary Group (1977–1979).
- Juan Carlos Rodríguez Ibarra (age 52) — President of the Regional Government of Extremadura (since 1983); Secretary-General of the PSOE of Extremadura (since 1988); Member of the Assembly of Extremadura for Badajoz (since 1983); Member of the PSOE Executive Commission (1994–1997); Secretary-General of the PSOE of Badajoz (1979–1988); Member of the Congress of Deputies for Badajoz (1977–1983); Minister of Health and Social Security of Extremadura (1978–1979).
- Pasqual Maragall (age 59) — President of the PSC (since 2000); Member of the Parliament of Catalonia for Barcelona (1988–1995 and since 1999); President of the European Committee of the Regions (since 1996–1998); Mayor of Barcelona (1982–1997); City Councillor of Barcelona (1979–1997); Deputy Mayor for Administrative Organization and Reform of Barcelona (1979–1982).

== Pre-congress ==
Party members and officials started organizing into internal lobbying groups ahead of the congress: joining the previously-existing factions of renovadores (which had formed the party apparatus during Almunia's tenure and the last part of González's), guerristas (supporters of Alfonso Guerra) and the Socialist Left (IS) current were the "Initiative for Change" or borrellistas (formed by supporters of Josep Borrell under the leadership of Manuel Escudero, who advocated for the introduction of term limits, primary elections and a democratization of the party), and the New Labour-inspired "New Way" (formed by a younger generation of party members who advocated for the PSOE's modernization, nominally led by José Luis Rodríguez Zapatero, a deputy for León).

President of Castilla–La Mancha José Bono, regarded as the initial favourite as well as the candidate of the party apparatus, quickly expressed his interest in running in order to present a credible alternative to the ruling PP; he represented the party's more moderate and Christian left wing. Rosa Díez, the leader of the PSOE delegation in the European Parliament, had been the first to announce her candidacy on 4 May, presenting herself as a candidate without sponsors and appealing to classical social democratic positions with a participatory approach to internal party affairs. Guerra's allies launched the candidacy of former social affairs minister Matilde Fernández, representing a democratic socialist platform supported by the guerristas, borrelistas and Socialist Left factions, as well as an opposition front to Bono. Finally, Zapatero and his New Way platform advocated for a profound renewal of the party's leadership, ideological project, organizational model and relationship with society.

Others, such as former justice and interior minister Juan Alberto Belloch, announced a willingness to run but conditioned it to primaries being held to elect the new secretary-general. The open nature of the contest led to a proliferation of potential candidates—many of them without any chance of success—which prompted the Political Commission to set out rules to rationalize the process and re-evaluate an initial intention to provide contenders with resources for their campaigns.

Efforts were done by various party sectors to prevent "behind-the-scenes" agreements between candidates that could give an impression that the congressional outcome was already predetermined beforehand. The election of delegates to the congress concluded on 25 June.

== Congress ==
=== Election rules ===
The congress started without a clear system and procedure to elect the new party leadership; among the options discussed were the maintainment of the previous system—electing the whole executive commission, including the secretary-general, in a single vote by congress delegates—or holding separate votes for the post of secretary-general and the proposed list of members for the new executive commission.

The split-vote option was divisive: supporters defended that it allowed defeated candidates and their allies to be integrated in the executive commission that would be elected in a later vote, whereas opponents argued that it would give the future secretary-general a weakened mandate. The election of the secretary-general through a single ballot or a two-round system was also discussed, with the Political Commission formally proposing a first ballot under plurality voting for the office of secretary-general, then a second vote on the new leader's proposed executive.

Ultimately, the choice was put up to a vote by the delegates themselves, which voted to support the Political Commission's proposal.

Choice	Rules for SG election (Note: Political Commission's proposal to elect the party's secretary-general on the basis of plurality voting.)	
Choice	Votes	%
Yes	543	65.66
No	252	30.47
Abstentions	32	3.87
Total	827	
Valid votes	827	100.00
Invalid votes	0	0.00
Votes cast / turnout	827	82.87
Not voting	171	17.13
Total delegates	998	

=== Endorsements ===
Summary of candidate endorsement results
Candidate	Count	% T	% V
José Bono	350	35.07	47.43
José Luis Rodríguez Zapatero	184	18.44	24.93
Rosa Díez	103	10.32	13.96
Matilde Fernández	101	10.12	13.69
Total	738		
Valid endorsements	738	73.95	
Invalid endorsements / Not endorsing	260	26.05	
Total delegates	998		

Endorsements by delegates
Bono	47.43%
Zapatero	24.93%
Díez	13.96%
Fernández	13.69%

== Opinion polls ==
Poll results are listed in the tables below in reverse chronological order, showing the most recent first, and using the date the survey's fieldwork was done, as opposed to the date of publication. If such date is unknown, the date of publication is given instead. The highest percentage figure in each polling survey is displayed in bold, and the background shaded in the candidate's colour. In the instance of a tie, the figures with the highest percentages are shaded. Polls show data gathered among PSOE voters/supporters as well as Spanish voters as a whole, but not among party delegates, who were the ones ultimately entitled to vote in the congress.

=== PSOE voters ===
Polling firm/Commissioner	Fieldwork date	Sample size											Other /None	Question	Lead
Polling firm/Commissioner	Fieldwork date	Sample size	Bono	Díez	Fernández	Zapatero	González	Borrell	Chaves	Guerra	Maragall	Solana	Other /None	Question	Lead
**Congress election**	22 Jul 2000	—N/a (Note: PSOE delegates.)	40.7	6.5	11.0	**41.6**	–	–	–	–	–	–	0.3	—N/a	0.9
ASEP	3–8 Jul 2000	1,218	**35.0**	19.7	3.0	5.5	–	–	–	–	–	–	10.3	26.5	15.3
ASEP	5–10 Jun 2000	1,211	10.8	12.4	0.8	1.2	**35.7**	7.3	2.8	1.6	2.4	3.2	1.2	20.4	23.3
ASEP	10–15 Apr 2000	1,210	10.3	3.3	–	–	**37.0**	14.0	7.4	1.2	2.8	3.7	3.2	16.9	23.0

=== Spanish voters ===
Polling firm/Commissioner	Fieldwork date	Sample size											Other /None	Question	Lead
Polling firm/Commissioner	Fieldwork date	Sample size	Bono	Díez	Fernández	Zapatero	González	Borrell	Chaves	Guerra	Maragall	Solana	Other /None	Question	Lead
Sigma Dos/El Mundo	17 Jul 2000	?	**35.0**	24.0	5.0	11.0	–	–	–	–	–	–	25.0		11.0
ASEP	3–8 Jul 2000	1,218	**23.1**	16.5	3.1	4.1	–	–	–	–	–	–	4.6	48.5	6.6
ASEP	5–10 Jun 2000	1,211	7.8	8.5	1.3	0.8	**17.0**	4.5	2.6	1.1	2.8	3.2	1.3	49.1	8.5
ASEP	10–15 Apr 2000	1,210	6.3	2.6	–	–	**17.9**	6.5	5.1	0.9	3.5	4.9	3.9	48.5	11.4

== Results ==
=== Overall ===
Summary of the 22–23 July 2000 congress results
Candidate	SG		Executive		Committee	
Candidate	Votes	%	Votes	%	Votes	%
José Luis Rodríguez Zapatero	414	41.61	865	90.20	856	90.68
José Bono	405	40.70	Eliminated			
Matilde Fernández	109	10.95	Eliminated			
Rosa Díez	65	6.53	Eliminated			
Blank ballots	2	0.20	94	9.80	88	9.32
Total	995		959		944	
Valid votes	995	100.00	959	99.48	944	99.37
Invalid votes	0	0.00	5	0.52	6	0.63
Votes cast / turnout	995	99.70	964	96.59	950	95.19
Not voting	3	0.30	34	3.41	48	4.81
Total delegates	998		998		998	

Vote by delegates (Secretary-General)
Zapatero	41.61%
Bono	40.70%
Fernández	10.95%
Díez	6.53%
Blank ballots	0.20%

Vote by delegates (Executive Commission)
Zapatero	90.20%
Blank ballots	9.80%

Vote by delegates (Federal Committee)
Zapatero	90.68%
Blank ballots	9.32%

=== Executive composition ===
The Executive Commission was renewed almost entirely, with only four outgoing members—including José Luis Rodríguez Zapatero—remaining. The average age of members was 42.8 years, and of its 25 members—eight fewer than the previous executive commission—10 were women.

Executive posts:

- Leader
- Permanent commission

PSOE federal executive commission
Post	Officeholder
President	Manuel Chaves
Secretary-General	José Luis Rodríguez Zapatero
Secretary of Organization and Electoral Action	José Blanco
Secretary of Institutional Relations	Nicolás Redondo Terreros
Secretary of Innovation and Internal Communication	Enrique Martínez Marín
Secretary of International Relations	Trinidad Jiménez
Secretary of Economic Policy	Jordi Sevilla
Secretary of Employment, Social Policies and Immigration	Consuelo Rumí
Secretary of Environment and Regional Planning	Cristina Narbona
Secretary of Education, Higher Education, Culture and Research	Carme Chacón
Secretary of Equality	Micaela Navarro
Secretary of Public Liberties and Development of Autonomous Communities	Juan Fernando López Aguilar
Secretary of Consumers and Users	Isabel Pozuelo
Secretary of Relations with NGOs and Social Movements	Leire Pajín
Secretary of Cities and Municipal Policy	Álvaro Cuesta
Member without portfolio	Emilio Pérez Touriño
Member without portfolio	José Montilla
Member without portfolio	Francesc Antich
Member without portfolio	José Luis Asenjo
Member without portfolio	Lentxu Rubial
Member without portfolio	Ramón Ortiz
Member without portfolio	Basilia Sanz
Member without portfolio	Marcelino Iglesias
Member without portfolio	Gloria Calero
Member without portfolio	José María Barreda

== Bibliography ==
- Sanz Díaz, Benito (2015). "Primarias en España. Se inicia la era posfelipista. 34 congreso PSOE. 1997. Almunia versus Borrell. 24 de abril de 1998". Elecciones primarias en España. 1993-2015 (in Spanish). Valencia: University of Valencia. hdl:10550/44646.
- Pascual Bueno, Ernesto M. (2016). Selección de Líderes y Candidatos a la Presidencia del Gobierno (1976-2016). "El jardín secreto del PSOE" (PDF) (PhD) (in Spanish). Barcelona: Universidad Autónoma de Barcelona.
- Ramiro, Luis (2016). "Effects of party primaries on electoral performance: The Spanish Socialist primaries in local elections". Party Politics. 22 (1). Sage Journals: 125–136. doi:10.1177/1354068813514884.
