= 1999 PP national party congress =

- 29–31 January 1999

2,980 delegates in the National Congress Plurality needed to win
- Turnout: 2,318 (77.8%)
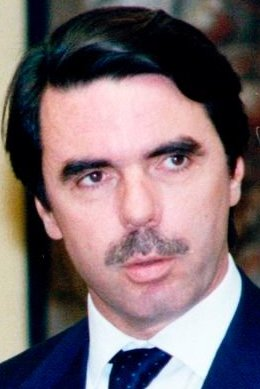

Candidate	José María Aznar	Blank ballots
Delegate vote	2,294 (99.3%)	17 (0.7%)
President before election
José María Aznar
Elected President
José María Aznar

The People's Party (PP) held its 13th national congress in Madrid from 29 to 31 January 1999, to renovate its governing bodies—including the post of president, which amounted to that of party leader—and establish the party platform and policy until the next congress.

== Candidates ==
Candidate	Notable positions	Announced	Ref.
=== Proposed ===
Candidates who were officially proposed to contest the party congress.
José María Aznar (age 45)	Prime Minister of Spain (since 1996); President of the PP (since 1990); Member of the Congress of Deputies for Madrid (since 1989); Leader of the Opposition of Spain (1989–1996); President of AP/PP of Castile and León (1985–1991); President of the Regional Government of Castile and León (1987–1989); Member of the Cortes of Castile and León for Ávila (1987–1989); Member of the Congress of Deputies for Ávila (1982–1987); Secretary-General of AP in La Rioja (1979–1980)	23 August 1998	

== Results ==
Summary of the 30 January 1999 congress results
Candidate	Executive	
Candidate	Votes	%
José María Aznar	2,294	99.26
Blank ballots	17	0.74
Total	2,311	
Valid votes	2,311	99.70
Invalid votes	7	0.30
Votes cast / turnout	2,318	77.79
Abstentions	662	22.21
Total delegates	2,980	

Vote by delegates (Executive)
Aznar	99.26%
Blank ballots	0.74%
