= 2004 PSOE federal party congress =

- 2−4 July 2004

972 delegates in the Federal Congress Plurality of delegates needed to win
- Turnout: Secretary-General: 932 (95.9%); Executive & Committee: 923 (95.0%)
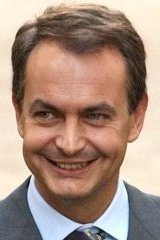

Candidate	José Luis Rodríguez Zapatero	Blank ballots
Delegate vote	891 (95.8%)	39 (4.2%)
Executive	886 (96.1%)	36 (3.9%)
Committee	903 (98.0%)	18 (2.0%)
Party leader before election
José Luis Rodríguez
Zapatero
Party leader after
election
José Luis Rodríguez
Zapatero

The Spanish Socialist Workers' Party (PSOE) held its 36th federal congress in Madrid from 2 to 4 July 2004, to renovate its governing bodies—including the post of secretary-general, which amounted to that of party leader—and establish the party platform and policy until the next congress.

It was held shortly after the party's victory in the 2004 general election and saw José Luis Rodríguez Zapatero being re-elected unopposed for a second term as party secretary-general, with 95.8% of the delegate vote in the congress (891 votes) and 4.2% of blank ballots (39). While party rules did not require Zapatero's candidacy to be voted due to no alternative candidate being fielded, he submitted himself to a vote by delegates nonetheless.

== Candidates ==
Candidate	Notable positions	Announced	Ref.
=== Proposed ===
Candidates who were officially proposed to contest the party congress.
José Luis Rodríguez Zapatero (age 43)	Prime Minister of Spain (since 2004); Secretary-General of the PSOE (since 2000); Member of the Congress of Deputies for Madrid (since 2004); Leader of the Opposition of Spain (2000–2004); Member of the Congress of Deputies for León (1986–2004); Member of the PSOE Executive Commission (1997–2000); Secretary-General of the PSOE in the province of León (1988–2000)	2 July 2004	

== Results ==
Summary of the 3–4 July 2004 congress results
Candidate	SG		Executive		Committee	
Candidate	Votes	%	Votes	%	Votes	%
José Luis Rodríguez Zapatero	891	95.81	886	96.10	903	98.05
Blank ballots	39	4.19	36	3.90	18	1.95
Total	930		922		921	
Valid votes	930	99.79	922	99.89	921	99.78
Invalid votes	2	0.21	1	0.11	2	0.22
Votes cast / turnout	932	95.88	923	94.96	923	94.96
Not voting	40	4.12	49	5.04	49	5.04
Total delegates	972		972		972	

Vote by delegates (Secretary-General)
Zapatero	95.81%
Blank ballots	4.19%

Vote by delegates (Executive Commission)
Zapatero	96.10%
Blank ballots	3.90%

Vote by delegates (Federal Committee)
Zapatero	98.05%
Blank ballots	1.95%
