= 1996 PP national party congress =

- 19–21 January 1996

2,938 delegates in the National Congress Plurality needed to win
- Turnout: 2,667 (90.8%) (executive); 2,647 (90.1%) (board)
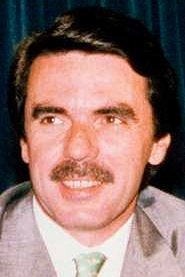

Candidate	José María Aznar	Blank ballots
Delegate vote	2,656 (99.9%)	3 (0.1%)
Board	2,628 (99.7%)	7 (0.3%)
President before election
José María Aznar
Elected President
José María Aznar

The People's Party (PP) held its 12th national congress in Madrid from 19 to 21 January 1996, to renovate its governing bodies—including the post of president, which amounted to that of party leader—and establish the party platform and policy until the next congress.

== Candidates ==
Candidate	Notable positions	Announced	Ref.
=== Proposed ===
Candidates who were officially proposed to contest the party congress.
José María Aznar (age 42)	President of the PP (since 1990); Leader of the Opposition of Spain (since 1989); Member of the Congress of Deputies for Madrid (since 1989); President of AP/PP of Castile and León (1985–1991); President of the Regional Government of Castile and León (1987–1989); Member of the Cortes of Castile and León for Ávila (1987–1989); Member of the Congress of Deputies for Ávila (1982–1987); Secretary-General of AP in La Rioja (1979–1980)	20 November 1995	

== Results ==
Summary of the 20 January 1996 congress results
Candidate	Executive		Board	
Candidate	Votes	%	Votes	%
José María Aznar	2,656	99.89	2,628	99.73
Blank ballots	3	0.11	7	0.27
Total	2,659		2,635	
Valid votes	2,659	99.70	2,635	99.55
Invalid votes	8	0.30	12	0.45
Votes cast / turnout	2,667	90.78	2,647	90.10
Abstentions	271	9.22	291	9.90
Total delegates	2,938		2,938	

Vote by delegates (Executive)
Aznar	99.89%
Blank ballots	0.11%

Vote by delegates (Board)
Aznar	99.73%
Blank ballots	0.27%
