= Order of precedence in Spain =

Relative preeminence of officials for ceremonial purposes

The Spanish order of precedence is currently prescribed by Royal Decree 2099/1983. The decree establishes the order of precedence of national official activities as well as common regulations to activities organised by municipalities, autonomous communities and other public institutions. The general order established by the decree is modified if the event takes place in the capital, Madrid, instead of elsewhere in Spain.

Order of Precedence by Full Royal Family

1. HM The King.
2. HM The Queen.
3. HRH The Princess of Asturias.
4. HRH Infanta Sofia de Borbón y Ortiz.
5. HM King Juan Carlos I.
6. HM Queen Sofia.
7. HRH Infanta Elena de Borbón y Grecia, Duchess of Lugo.
8. HRH Infanta Cristina de Borbón y Grecia.
9. HRH Infanta Margarita de Borbón y Borbón, The Duchess of Soria & Hernani.
10. HE The Duke of Soria & Hernani.

== Order of precedence in Madrid ==
1. The King (as the monarch)
2. The members of the royal family
  1. The Queen (as the consort)
  2. The Princess of Asturias (as the heir presumptive)
  3. Infanta Sofia (as daughter of the reigning king)
  4. The former monarch and consort
    1. King Juan Carlos
    2. Queen Sofia
  5. The Infantas of Spain in order of succession rights
    1. The Duchess of Lugo
    2. Infanta Cristina of Spain
    3. The Duchess of Hernani and Soria
    4. The Duke of Hernani & Soria
    5. The Dowager Duchess of Calabria
3. The President of the Government (Prime-Minister) – Pedro Sánchez
4. The President of the Congress of Deputies – Francina Armengol
5. The President of the Senate – Pedro Rollán
6. The President of the Constitutional Court – Cándido Conde-Pumpido
7. The President of the General Council of the Judiciary and of the Supreme Court – Isabel Perelló
8. The Deputy Prime Ministers
  1. The First Deputy Prime Minister, Minister of Economy, Trade and Business and Minister of Transport – Carlos Cuerpo
  2. The Second Deputy Prime Minister and Minister of Labor and Social Economy – Yolanda Díaz
  3. The Third Deputy Prime Minister and Minister for the Ecological Transition and Demographic Challenge – Sara Aagesen
9. Ministers of the Cabinet
  1. The Minister of Foreign Affairs, European Union and Cooperation – José Manuel Albares
  2. The Minister of the Presidency, Justice and Relations with the Cortes – Félix Bolaños
  3. The Minister of Defence – Margarita Robles
  4. The Minister of the Interior – Fernando Grande-Marlaska
  5. The Minister of Finance – Arcadi España
  6. The Minister of Transport and Sustainable Mobility – Concurrently held by the Deputy prime minister in acting capacity
  7. The Minister of Education, Vocational Training and Sports – Milagros Tolón
  8. The Minister of Industry and Tourism – Jordi Hereu
  9. The Minister of Agriculture, Fisheries and Food – Luis Planas
  10. The Minister of Territorial Policy and Democratic Memory – Ángel Víctor Torres
  11. The Minister of Housing and Urban Agenda – Isabel Rodríguez
  12. The Minister of Culture – Ernest Urtasun
  13. The Minister of Health – Mónica García
  14. The Minister of Social Rights, Consumer Affairs and 2030 Agenda – Pablo Bustinduy
  15. The Minister of Science, Innovation and Universities – Diana Morant
  16. The Minister of Equality – Ana Redondo
  17. The Minister of Inclusion, Social Security and Migrations and Spokesperson of the Government – Elma Saiz
  18. The Minister for Digital Transformation and Civil Service – Óscar López
  19. The Minister of Youth and Children – Sira Rego
10. The Dean of the Diplomatic Corps – The Apostolic Nuncio (Bernardito Auza)
11. Ambassadors accredited to Spain
12. Former prime ministers by order of tenure
  1. Felipe González
  2. José María Aznar
  3. José Luis Rodríguez Zapatero
  4. Mariano Rajoy
13. The presidents of the Autonomous communities of Spain, in order of creation
  1. The President of the Basque Government – Imanol Pradales
  2. The President of the Government of Catalonia – Salvador Illa
  3. The President of the Regional Government of Galicia – Alfonso Rueda
  4. The President of the Regional Government of Andalusia – Juan Manuel Moreno
  5. The President of the Principality of Asturias – Adrián Barbón
  6. The President of Cantabria – María José Sáenz de Buruaga
  7. The President of La Rioja – Gonzalo Capellán
  8. The President of the Region of Murcia – Fernando López Miras
  9. The President of the Valencian Government – Juan Francisco Pérez Llorca
  10. The President of the Government of Aragon – Jorge Azcón
  11. The President of the Junta of Communities of Castilla–La Mancha – Emiliano García-Page
  12. The President of the Canary Islands – Fernando Clavijo
  13. The President of the Government of Navarre – María Chivite
  14. The President of the Regional Government of Extremadura – María Guardiola
  15. The President of the Government of the Balearic Islands – Margalida Prohens
  16. The President of the Community of Madrid – Isabel Díaz Ayuso
  17. The President of the Junta of Castile and León – Alfonso Fernández Mañueco
  18. The Mayor-President of Ceuta – Juan Jesús Vivas
  19. The Mayor-President of Melilla – Juan José Imbroda
14. The Leader of the Opposition – Alberto Núñez Feijóo
15. The Mayor of Madrid – José Luis Martínez-Almeida
16. The Head of the Royal Household – Camilo Villarino
17. The President of the Council of State – Carmen Calvo
18. The President of Court of Auditors – Enriqueta Chicano Jávega
19. The Prosecutor General of the State – Teresa Peramato
20. The Ombudsman – Ángel Gabilondo
21. Secretaries of State and assimilated personnel according to the precedence of their ministries
22. The Chief of the Defence Staff – General Admiral Teodoro Esteban López Calderón
23. The Chief of Staff of the Army – Army General Amador Fernando Enseñat y Berea
24. The Chief of Staff of the Navy – Admiral Antonio Piñeiro Sánchez
25. The Chief of Staff of the Air and Space Force – Air General Francisco Braco Carbó
26. Vice Presidents of the Congress of Deputies and the Senate
27. The Chairman of the Supreme Council of Military Justice
28. The Government's Delegate in Madrid
29. The Deputy Inspector-General of the First Military Region
30. The Chief of the Central Jurisdiction of the Navy
31. The Chief of the First Air Region
32. The Secretary-General of the Royal Household
33. The Head of the Military Chamber of the Royal Household
34. Under-secretaries and assimilated personnel according to the precedence of their ministries
35. The President of the Assembly of Madrid – Enrique Ossorio
36. Foreign Chargé d'affaires accredited to Spain
37. The President of the Institute of Spain
38. The Chief of Protocol of the State (Director of Protocol of the Prime Minister's Office)
39. Directors-general and assimilated personnel
40. Ministers of the Government of the Community of Madrid
41. Members of the Bureau of the Assembly of Madrid
42. The President of the High Court of Justice of Madrid
43. The Chief Prosecutor of the High Court of Justice of Madrid
44. Deputies and Senators for Madrid
45. The Rector of the Complutense University of Madrid (UCM) – Joaquín Goyache
46. The Rector of the Autonomous University of Madrid (UAM) – Amaya Mendikoetxea
47. The Rector of the Technical University of Madrid (UPM) – Óscar García Suárez
48. The Rector of the National University for Distance Education (UNED) – Ricardo Mairal
49. The Rector of the University of Alcalá – José Vicente Saz
50. The Rector of the Carlos III University (UC3M) – Juan Romo
51. The Rector of the Rey Juan Carlos University (URJC) – Javier Ramos
52. Deputy mayors of Madrid

== Order of Precedence when not in Madrid ==
- The King
- The Queen
- The Princess of Asturias
- The Infantes of Spain
- The President of the Government
- The President of the Congress of Deputies
- The President of the Senate
- The Chairperson of the Constitutional Court
- The Chairperson of the General Council of the Judiciary Power
- The First Vice president (if applicable)
- The Second Vice President (if applicable)
- The president of the Autonomous Community where the event is taking place
- Ministers of the government according to the order before mentioned.
- Dean of the Diplomatic Corps
- Foreign ambassadors accredited to Spain
- Former prime ministers
- Presidents of other Autonomous Communities according to the order before mentioned
- Leaders of the Opposition
- President of the Community's Legislature
- The Government's Delegate to the Autonomous Community where the event is taking place
- The Mayor of the Place
- The Chief of the House of the King
- The Chairman of the Council of State
- The Chairman of the Auditor Court
- The Prosecutor General of the State
- The Ombudsman
- Secretaries of State and assimilate personnel
- The Chief of Staff of The Defence
- The Chief of Staff of the Army
- The Admiral Chief of Staff of the Navy
- The Chief of Staff of the Air Force
- Vice-presidents of the Congress and the Senate
- Chairman of the Supreme Council of Military Justice
- Captain General of the Military Region
- General Commander of the Naval Zone
- Lieutenant General of the Aerial Zone
- Commander General of the Fleet
- The Chief of the Military Quarter and Secretary General of the House of the King
- Ministers of the Autonomous Community's Government
- Members of the Bureau of the Community's Legislature
- The Chairman of the Community's High Court
- The Chief Prosecutor of the High Court
- Under Secretaries and Assimilated Personnel
- Secretaries of the Congress of Deputies and the Senate
- Foreign Chargé d'affaires accredited to Spain
- The President of the Instituto de España
- The National Chief of Protocol
- Deputy Government's delegate of the province (where applicable)
- The President of The Provincial Deputation or Insular Council (where applicable)
- Directors Generals and assimilated personnel
- Deputies and Senators for the province
- Rectors of the Universities of the University District where the event is taking place, by order of establishment
- The Insular Government's Delegate (only in Canary and Balearic Islands)
- The Chairman of the Provincial Court
- The Military Governor
- The Chief of the Naval Sector
- The Chief of the Air Sector
- Lieutenant Mayors of the Place
- Military Commanders
- Foreign Consuls

== Order of Preference of Spanish Institutions in Madrid ==
- The Royal Family
- The Government of Spain
- The Diplomatic Corps accredited to Spain
- The Bureau of the Congress of Deputies
- The Bureau of the Senate
- The Constitutional Court
- The General Council of the Judiciary Power
- The Supreme Court
- The Council of State
- The Auditor Court
- The Office of the President
- Ministries attending to the above order
- The Instituto de España and the Royal Academies
- The Community of Madrid Executive Council
- The Madrid Assembly
- The Madrid High Court of Justice
- The Madrid City Council
- The Universities

== Order of Precedence of Spanish Institutions when not in Madrid ==
- The Royal Family
- The Government of Spain
- The Diplomatic Corps accredited to Spain
- The Autonomic Executive Council
- The Bureau of the Congress of Deputies
- The Bureau of the Senate
- The Constitutional Court
- The General Council of the Judiciary Power
- The Supreme Court
- The Autonomic Legislature
- The Council of State
- The Auditor Court
- The Regional High Court of Justice
- The City or Town Council
- The Office of the President
- Ministries attending to the above order
- Autonomic Ministries
- The Instituto de España and the Royal Academies
- Spanish Government's office in the Autonomous Community
- Provincial Deputation or Insular Council
- Provincial Court
- The Universities
- Foreign Consular Offices
