= 1997 PSOE federal party congress =

- 20−22 June 1997

945 delegates in the Federal Congress Plurality of delegates needed to win
- Turnout: Executive: 914 (96.7%); Committee: 925 (97.9%)
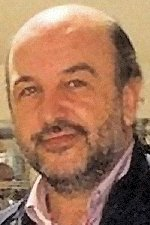

Candidate	Joaquín Almunia	Blank ballots
Executive	681 (74.7%)	231 (25.3%)
Committee	823 (89.2%)	100 (10.8%)
Party leader before election
Felipe González
Party leader after
election
Joaquín Almunia

The Spanish Socialist Workers' Party (PSOE) held its 34th federal congress in Madrid from 20 to 22 June 1997, to renovate its governing bodies—including the post of secretary-general, which amounted to that of party leader—and establish the party platform and policy until the next congress.

Felipe González, who had led the PSOE since 1974 and had been prime minister of Spain between 1982 and 1996, announced in the first day of congress that he would not be seeking re-election as party leader, a move that caught everyone by surprise. This move was seen as a way to facilitate the party's renovation, but also to put an end to tensions over the continuity of his former colleague and now rival, deputy secretary-general Alfonso Guerra, who was forced to step down as a result.

Amid fears of an internal struggle over party succession, with possible contenders including former public works minister Josep Borrell, regional party leaders and González himself backed former several times minister Joaquín Almunia as the latter's replacement. Almunia would be elected unopposed as new secretary-general, securing 74.7% of the delegate vote in the congress for his executive, with 25.3% casting blank ballots.

== Background ==
Initially scheduled for 1998, the leadership of the Spanish Socialist Workers' Party (PSOE) announced that it would hold the party's congress one year earlier, in June 1997, in order to better organize themselves as the opposition to the incumbent government of the People's Party (PP) under prime minister José María Aznar.

The congress had been initially expected to focus on the continuity of deputy secretary-general Alfonso Guerra—whose support had dwindled internally—in the party's executive, as well as various proposals to renovate the party's image and structure (including a proposal for drastically reducing the executive body's size and move the party's regional leaders to a separate political body having been brought forward by PSOE leader Felipe González). González's leadership of the party was not in question, despite his previous plans in 1995 to renounce as its prime ministerial candidate ahead of the 1996 Spanish general election in favour of then-foreign affairs minister Javier Solana—a plan thwarted by Solana's election as NATO secretary-general in December 1995—and González's own announcement in May 1997 that he did not wish to run for the post of prime minister again. Overall, it was assumed that González would remain at the helm of the party's transition towards its renovation.

As the congress date came closer, the political focus centered on Guerra's position, with a majority of PSOE regional leaders pushing for his removal. Guerra himself threatened to entrench himself in the post with the support of party delegates, while denouncing a "conspiracy" against him. Tensions rose further when, in the week preceding the congress, the PSOE leadership dared Guerra to challenge González's list. In the hours previous to the congress' start, it emerged that González would be addressing the process for his succession in his opening remarks in order to move the focus from the internal struggle around Guerra's future.

== Candidates ==
Candidate	Notable positions	Announced	Ref.
=== Proposed ===
Candidates who were officially proposed to contest the party congress.
Joaquín Almunia (age 49)	Spokesperson of the Socialist Group of the Congress (since 1994); Secretary of Studies and Programs of the PSOE (1981–1984 and since 1994); Member of the Congress of Deputies for Madrid (since 1979); Minister for Public Administrations of Spain (1986–1991); Minister of Labour and Social Security of Spain (1982–1986); Secretary of Trade Union Policy of the PSOE (1979–1981)	21 June 1997	

=== Declined ===
The individuals in this section were the subject of speculation about their possible candidacy, but publicly denied or recanted interest in running:

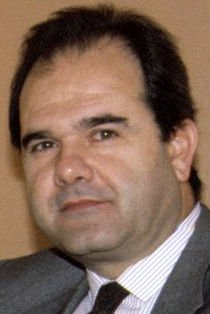
Manuel Chaves

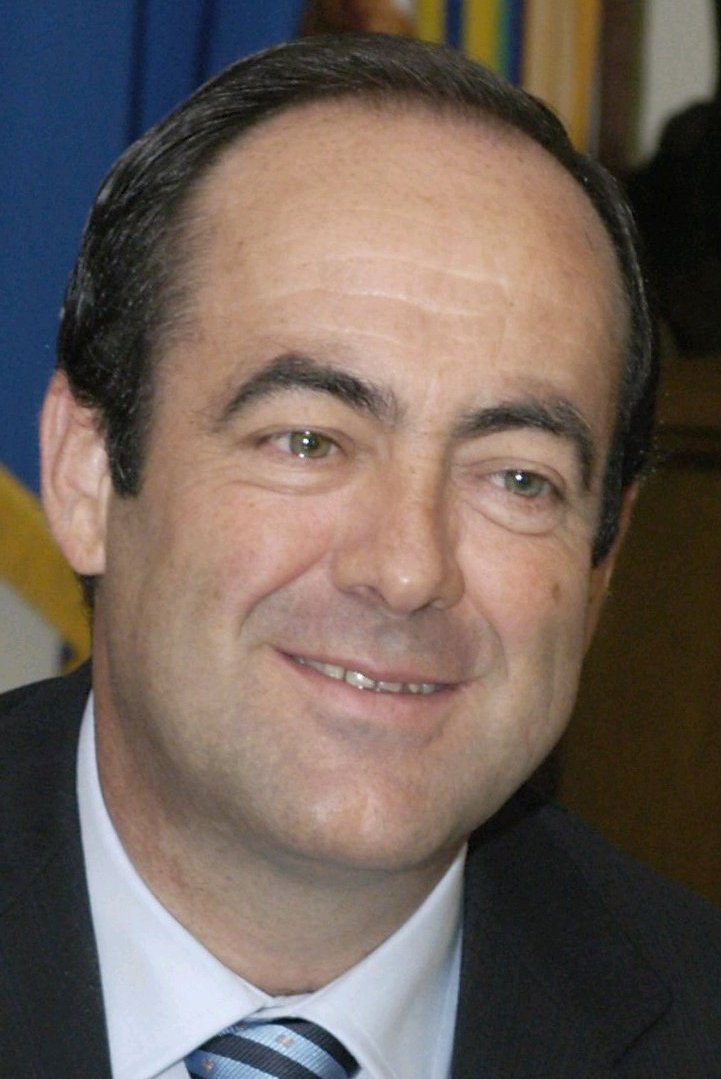
José Bono

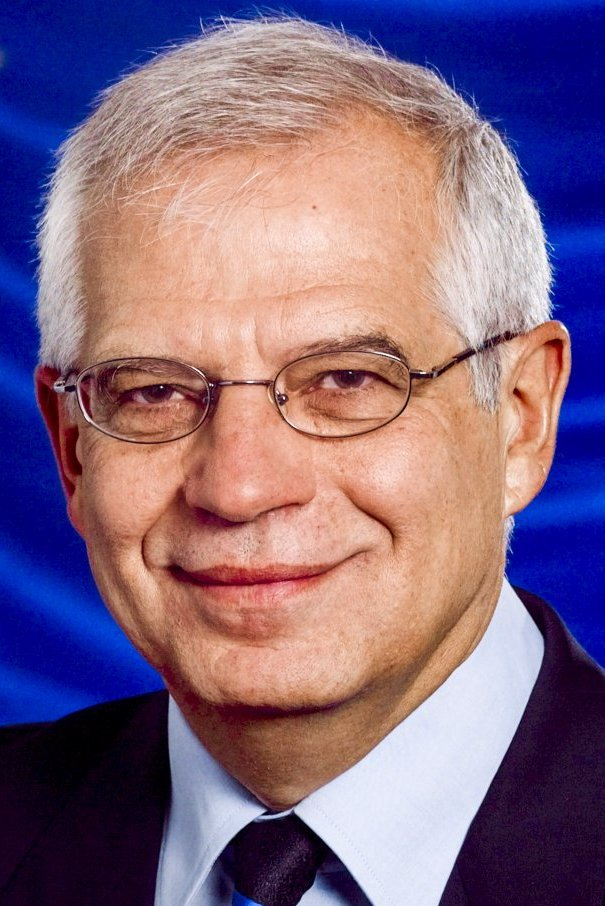
Josep Borrell

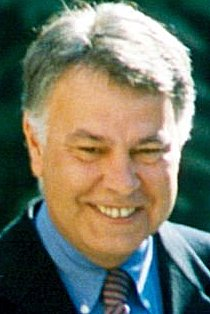
Felipe González
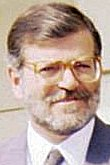
Juan Carlos Rodríguez Ibarra

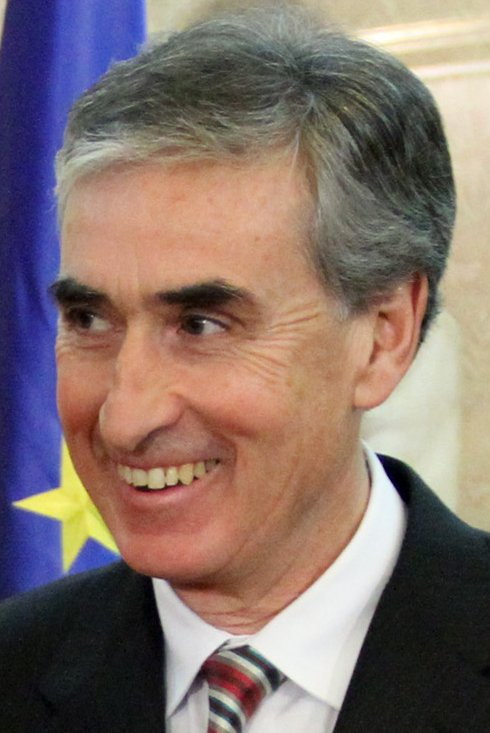
Ramón Jáuregui

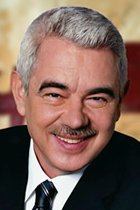
Pasqual Maragall

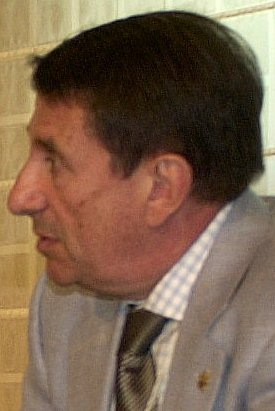
Francisco Vázquez
- Manuel Chaves (age 51) — Secretary-General of the PSOE–A (since 1994); President of the Regional Government of Andalusia (since 1990); Member of the Parliament of Andalusia for Cádiz (since 1990); Member of the PSOE Executive Commission (1981–1984 and since 1990); Minister of Labour and Social Security of Spain (1986–1990); Member of the Congress of Deputies for Cádiz (1977–1990); Secretary of Economy of the PSOE (1984–1988).
- José Bono (age 46) — President of the PSCM–PSOE (since 1990); Member of the PSOE Executive Commission (since 1990); Member of the Cortes of Castilla–La Mancha for Toledo (since 1987); President of the Regional Government of Castilla–La Mancha (since 1983); Secretary-General of the PSCM–PSOE (1988–1990); Member of the Cortes of Castilla–La Mancha for Albacete (1983–1987); Member of the Congress of Deputies for Albacete (1979–1983); Fourth Secretary of the Congress of Deputies (1979–1982).
- Josep Borrell (age 50) — Member of the Congress of Deputies for Barcelona (since 1986); Minister of Public Works, Transport and Environment of Spain (1993–1996); Minister of Public Works and Urbanism of Spain (1991–1993); Secretary of State of Finance of Spain (1984–1991); Secretary-General of Budget and Public Expenditure of Spain (1982–1984); City Councillor of Majadahonda (1979–1983).
- Felipe González (age 55) – Leader of the Opposition of Spain (since 1996); Secretary-General of the PSOE (1974–1979 and since 1979); Member of the Congress of Deputies for Madrid (since 1977); Prime Minister of Spain (1982–1996); President pro tempore of the Council of the European Union (1989 and 1995); Spokesperson of the Congress Socialist Parliamentary Group (1977–1979).
- Juan Carlos Rodríguez Ibarra (age 49) — Member of the PSOE Executive Commission (since 1994); President of the Regional Government of Extremadura (since 1983); Secretary-General of the PSOE of Extremadura (since 1988); Member of the Assembly of Extremadura for Badajoz (since 1983); Secretary-General of the PSOE of Badajoz (1979–1988); Member of the Congress of Deputies for Badajoz (1977–1983); Minister of Health and Social Security of Extremadura (1978–1979).
- Ramón Jáuregui (age 48) — Minister of Justice, Labour and Social Security of the Basque Country (since 1995); Member of the Basque Parliament for Gipuzkoa (1980–1983 and since 1990); Secretary-General of the PSE–PSOE/PSE–EE (PSOE) (since 1988); Vice Lehendakari (1987–1991); President of the PSE–PSOE (1985–1988); Delegate of the Government of Spain in the Basque Country (1983–1987); City Councillor of San Sebastián (1979–1980); President of the Caretaker Commission of the City Council of San Sebastián (1978–1979).
- Pasqual Maragall (age 56) — President of the European Committee of the Regions (since 1996); Mayor of Barcelona (since 1982); City Councillor of Barcelona (since 1979); Member of the Parliament of Catalonia for Barcelona (1988–1995); Deputy Mayor for Administrative Organization and Reform of Barcelona (1979–1982).
- Francisco Vázquez (age 51) — Secretary-General of the PSdeG–PSOE (1980–1982 and since 1994); Mayor of A Coruña (since 1983); City Councillor of A Coruña (since 1983); Member of the Congress of Deputies for A Coruña (1977–1981 and since 1982); President of the Spanish Federation of Municipalities and Provinces (1991–1995); Member of the Parliament of Galicia for A Coruña (1981–1982).

== Opinion polls ==
Poll results are listed in the tables below in reverse chronological order, showing the most recent first, and using the date the survey's fieldwork was done, as opposed to the date of publication. If such date is unknown, the date of publication is given instead. The highest percentage figure in each polling survey is displayed in bold, and the background shaded in the candidate's colour. In the instance of a tie, the figures with the highest percentages are shaded.

=== PSOE voters ===
Polling firm/Commissioner	Fieldwork date	Sample size									Other /None	Question	Lead
Polling firm/Commissioner	Fieldwork date	Sample size	González (Inc.)	Almunia	Guerra	Solana	Bono	Borrell	Chaves	Serra	Other /None	Question	Lead
ASEP	7–11 Jul 1997 (Note: Conducted after the congress.)	1,214	–	7.9	4.1	**15.7**	4.1	7.0	0.0	0.6	29.4	31.4	7.8
Imagen & Opinión/ABC	21–23 Nov 1995	1,000	–	–	9.0	**65.0**	–	16.0	–	4.0	6.0	–	49.0
Imagen & Opinión/ABC	21–23 Nov 1995	1,000	**92.0**	–	–	6.0	–	3.0	–	–	0.0	–	86.0

=== Spanish voters ===
Polling firm/Commissioner	Fieldwork date	Sample size											Other /None	Question	Lead
Polling firm/Commissioner	Fieldwork date	Sample size	González (Inc.)	Almunia	Guerra	Solana	Bono	Borrell	Chaves	Serra	Corcuera	Solchaga	Other /None	Question	Lead
ASEP	7–11 Jul 1997	1,214	–	5.2	1.8	**9.7**	2.6	5.1	0.2	0.4	–	–	36.3	38.7	4.5
Imagen & Opinión/ABC	21–23 Nov 1995	1,000	–	–	7.0	**55.0**	–	17.0	–	5.0	–	–	16.0	–	38.0
Imagen & Opinión/ABC	21–23 Nov 1995	1,000	**75.0**	–	–	13.0	–	4.0	–	–	–	–	8.0	–	62.0
Opina/La Vanguardia	8–11 Apr 1994	2,000	–	–	**5.5**	2.3	–	–	0.8	4.7	2.9	1.2	16.4	66.2	0.8

== Delegate estimations ==
González's allies (renovadores, Spanish for "renovators") were estimated as having the support of about 80% of elected delegated to the congress, whereas the pro-Guerra faction (guerristas) was attributed between less than 20% and no more than 25%.

== Results ==
=== Overall ===
Summary of the 21–22 June 1997 congress results
Candidate	Executive		Committee	
Candidate	Votes	%	Votes	%
Joaquín Almunia	681	74.67	823	89.17
Blank ballots	231	25.33	100	10.83
Total	912		923	
Valid votes	912	99.78	923	99.78
Invalid votes	2	0.22	2	0.22
Votes cast / turnout	914	96.72	925	97.88
Not voting	31	3.28	20	2.12
Total delegates	945		945	

Vote by delegates (Executive Commission)
Almunia	74.67%
Blank ballots	25.33%

Vote by delegates (Federal Committee)
Almunia	89.17%
Blank ballots	10.83%

=== Executive composition ===
Executive posts:

- Leader
- Permanent commission

PSOE federal executive commission
Post	Officeholder
President	Ramón Rubial
Secretary-General	Joaquín Almunia
Secretary of Organization	Ciprià Ciscar
Secretary of Communication	Alfredo Pérez Rubalcaba
Secretary of International Relations	Raimon Obiols
Secretary of Regional Policy	Ramón Jáuregui
Secretary of Local Policy	Alfonso Perales
Secretary of Economy	Juan Manuel Eguiagaray
Secretary of Employment	Joan Lerma
Secretary of Social Welfare	Clementina Díez de Baldeón
Secretary of Social Movements	Carmen Cerdeira
Secretary of Culture	Joaquín Leguina
Secretary of Women Participation	Micaela Navarro
Member without portfolio	José Bono
Member without portfolio	Josep Borrell
Member without portfolio	Augusto Brito
Member without portfolio	Abel Caballero
Member without portfolio	Manuel Chaves
Member without portfolio	Dolores Eguren
Member without portfolio	Josefa Frau
Member without portfolio	Carmen Hermosín
Member without portfolio	Ana Leiva
Member without portfolio	María Antonia Martínez
Member without portfolio	Carmen Martínez Ten
Member without portfolio	Ana Noguera
Member without portfolio	Alberto Pérez Cueto
Member without portfolio	Montserrat Reyes
Member without portfolio	Teresa Riera
Member without portfolio	José Luis Rodríguez Zapatero
Member without portfolio	Consuelo Rumí
Member without portfolio	Paquita Sauquillo
Member without portfolio	Narcís Serra
Member without portfolio	Francisco Vázquez

== Bibliography ==
- Sanz Díaz, Benito (2015). "Primarias en España. Se inicia la era posfelipista. 34 congreso PSOE. 1997. Almunia versus Borrell. 24 de abril de 1998". Elecciones primarias en España. 1993-2015 (in Spanish). Valencia: University of Valencia. hdl:10550/44646.
- Pascual Bueno, Ernesto M. (2016). Selección de Líderes y Candidatos a la Presidencia del Gobierno (1976-2016). "El jardín secreto del PSOE" (PDF) (PhD) (in Spanish). Barcelona: Universidad Autónoma de Barcelona.
