= 1998 PSOE prime ministerial primary =

- 24 April 1998
- Opinion polls
- Registered: 383,462
- Turnout: 207,774 (54.2%)
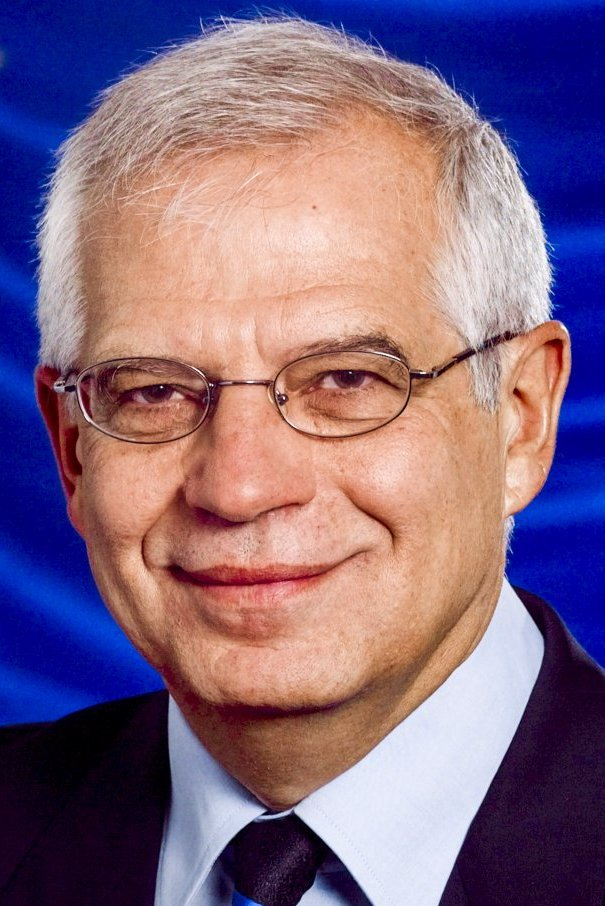

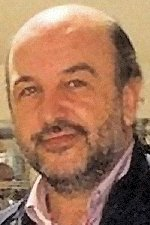
Candidate	Josep Borrell	Joaquín Almunia
Popular vote	114,254	92,860
Percentage	55.0%	44.7%
Previous prime
ministerial nominee
Felipe González (1996)
Elected prime
ministerial nominee
Josep Borrell (Note: Withdrew on 14 May 1999.)

A primary election was held on Friday, 24 April 1998, to elect the prime ministerial nominee of the Spanish Socialist Workers' Party (PSOE) for the 2000 Spanish general election.

Following the 1997 PSOE congress, former several times minister Joaquín Almunia became new party leader succeeding former prime minister Felipe González, who surprisingly announced during the congress' opening that he would not be running for re-election as PSOE secretary-general. González's succession process was perceived as rushed and the result of a pact between party elites, prompting Almunia to propose a primary election as a way to legitimize his leadership. Former public works minister Josep Borrell, who for years had been the subject of speculation as one of González's possible successors, also announced his run in the primary.

The election resulted in the party's grassroots unexpectedly backing Borrell over Almunia, but the latter remained as secretary-general in order to prevent an extraordinary party congress. This situation prompted a "bicephaly" ( duumvirate) which would see both Borrell and Almunia clashing for months on their roles and the party's platform. Borrell would withdraw in May 1999 after it was unveiled that two former aides were involved in a judicial investigation for tax fraud, leaving a vacancy that resulted in Almunia being proclaimed as prime ministerial candidate without opposition. Almunia would went on to lose the 2000 general election, in which José María Aznar's People's Party (PP) would secure an absolute majority of seats.

== Background ==
The debate on whether to hold an internal primary election to elect the Spanish Socialist Workers' Party (PSOE)'s nominee for prime minister of Spain dated back to 1995, when long-lasting leader Felipe González had seriously considered for several months not to run in the 1996 general election. The election of foreign affairs minister Javier Solana—widely seen as González's most likely successor—as NATO secretary-general in December 1995 conditioned González's plans to retire and led to him confirming a new run, thwarting the aspirations of other likely contenders, such as public works minister Josep Borrell. In May 1997, González had announced that he did not wish to run for the post of prime minister again, despite his leadership of the party not being in question.

The 1997 PSOE federal party congress saw González surprisingly announcing his immediate retirement and his backing of Joaquín Almunia—who had been a former minister of labour and public administrations under his governments—as the party's new secretary-general, but this had been perceived as a rushed process influenced by the powerful regional leaders (colloquially referred to as barones, Spanish for "barons"), with other potential candidates such as Borrell being sidelined by party elites for the sake of unity in the wake of González's shock farewell. Worried about a perceived lack of legitimacy among party members, Almunia initially declined to propose himself as the party's candidate for prime minister in the next general election, instead advocating for alternatives such as calling for Felipe González to consider a new run, or for the candidate to be elected through primaries in the first semester of 1998. González ruled himself out, whereas the primary proposal—which had been voted and approved in the party congress in June 1997 for local and regional elections—was met with skepticism or outright opposition from PSOE regional leaders.

Following increasing pressure from his party, Almunia ultimately accepted to run for the post in the primary election as a way to legitimize his leadership, while warning that he would resign as secretary-general should he lose to any prospective contender. On the eve of the official start of the primary process, it transpired that Borrell had been considering for some time to field his own candidacy, which he confirmed on 21 March 1998.

== Overview ==
=== Procedure ===
The PSOE Federal Committee approved on 21 March 1998 a party regulation governing the selection of candidates to public offices through a closed primary system, which included the election of prime ministerial nominees.

The primary election was organized on the basis of plurality voting. Voting comprised all members of the PSOE—including its regional branches—and the Socialists' Party of Catalonia (PSC). Candidates seeking to run were required to collect the endorsements of either at least 7% of party members (which for the 1998 prime ministerial primary amounted to 26,843 endorsements), 15% of federal committee members, a majority of members in the federal executive commission or a majority in the territorial council. In the event of only one candidate meeting this requirement, the primaries would be left uncontested with such candidate being elected unopposed.

=== Timetable ===
The key dates of the primary election procedure are listed below (all times are CET):

- 21 March: Official announcement of the primary election.
- 23 March: Start of endorsement collection and candidacy submission periods.
- 12 April: End of endorsement collection and candidacy submission periods.
- 13 April: Provisional proclamation of primary candidates.
- 16 April: Definitive proclamation of primary candidates.
- 17 April: Official start of internal information campaign.
- 23 April: Last day of internal information campaign.
- 24 April: Primary election (polling stations open at 1 pm and close at 8 pm).
- 25 April: Proclamation of prime ministerial nominee.

== Candidates ==
Candidate	Notable positions	Announced	Ref.
=== Qualified ===
Candidates who met endorsement requirements and qualified to contest the primary election.
Josep Borrell (age 51)	Member of the PSOE Executive Commission (since 1997); Member of the Congress of Deputies for Barcelona (since 1986); Minister of Public Works, Transport and Environment of Spain (1993–1996); Minister of Public Works and Urbanism of Spain (1991–1993); Secretary of State of Finance of Spain (1984–1991); Secretary-General of Budget and Public Expenditure of Spain (1982–1984); City Councillor of Majadahonda (1979–1983)	21 March 1998	
Joaquín Almunia (age 49)	Secretary-General of the PSOE (since 1997); Leader of the Opposition of Spain (since 1997); Member of the Congress of Deputies for Madrid (since 1979); Spokesperson of the Socialist Group of the Congress (1994–1997); Secretary of Studies and Programs of the PSOE (1981–1984 and 1994–1997); Minister for Public Administrations of Spain (1986–1991); Minister of Labour and Social Security of Spain (1982–1986); Secretary of Trade Union Policy of the PSOE (1979–1981)	23 March 1998	

=== Declined ===
The individuals in this section were the subject of speculation about their possible candidacy, but publicly denied or recanted interest in running:

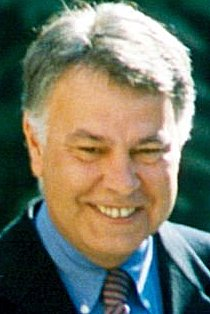
Felipe González
- Felipe González (age 56) – Member of the Congress of Deputies for Madrid (since 1977); Leader of the Opposition of Spain (1996–1997); Secretary-General of the PSOE (1974–1979 and 1979–1997); Prime Minister of Spain (1982–1996); President pro tempore of the Council of the European Union (1989 and 1995); Spokesperson of the Congress Socialist Parliamentary Group (1977–1979).

== Endorsements ==
Summary of candidate endorsement results
Candidate	Party members			Federal committee		
Candidate	Count	% T	% V	Count	% T	% V
Joaquín Almunia	50,170	13.08	100.00	Not applicable		
Josep Borrell	Not applicable			65	31.55	100.00
Total	50,170			65		
Valid endorsements	50,170	13.08		65	31.55	
Not endorsing	333,292	86.92		141	68.45	
Total members	383,462			206		

== Opinion polls ==
Poll results are listed in the tables below in reverse chronological order, showing the most recent first, and using the date the survey's fieldwork was done, as opposed to the date of publication. If such date is unknown, the date of publication is given instead. The highest percentage figure in each polling survey is displayed in bold, and the background shaded in the candidate's colour. In the instance of a tie, the figures with the highest percentages are shaded. Polls show data gathered among PSOE voters/supporters as well as Spanish voters as a whole, but not among party members, who were the ones ultimately entitled to vote in the primary election.

=== PSOE voters ===
Polling firm/Commissioner	Fieldwork date	Sample size							Other /None	Question	Lead
Polling firm/Commissioner	Fieldwork date	Sample size	Almunia (Inc.)	Borrell	Solana	Bono	Guerra	Maragall	Other /None	Question	Lead
**Primary election**	24 Apr 1998	—N/a (Note: PSOE members.)	44.7	**55.0**	–	–	–	–	0.3	—N/a	10.3
ASEP	20–24 Apr 1998	1,204	**38.9**	31.4	–	–	–	–	–	29.7	7.5
Sigma Dos/El Mundo	19 Apr 1998	?	**40.2**	24.5	–	–	–	–	21.2	14.1	15.7
DECO/PSOE	27–28 Mar 1998	2,000	**48.8**	31.1	–	–	–	–	20.1		17.7
Opina/La Vanguardia	26 Mar 1998	83	33.7	**43.4**	–	–	–	–	–	22.9	9.7
Opina/La Vanguardia	26 Mar 1998	600	**37.3**	35.7	–	–	–	–	–	27.0	1.6
Sigma Dos/El Mundo	26 Mar 1998	?	**43.9**	30.6	–	–	–	–	9.5	16.0	13.3
Demoscopia/El País	24–25 Mar 1998	336	**40.0**	35.0	–	–	–	–	25.0		5.0
ASEP	7–11 Jul 1997	1,214	10.0	4.6	**11.6**	4.7	2.3	0.9	3.0	63.0	1.6

=== Spanish voters ===
Polling firm/Commissioner	Fieldwork date	Sample size							Other /None	Question	Lead
Polling firm/Commissioner	Fieldwork date	Sample size	Almunia (Inc.)	Borrell	Solana	Bono	Guerra	Maragall	Other /None	Question	Lead
ASEP	20–24 Apr 1998	1,204	**30.1**	21.5	–	–	–	–	–	48.5	8.6
Sigma Dos/El Mundo	19 Apr 1998	?	**25.7**	17.5	–	–	–	–	40.1	16.8	8.2
Vox Pública/El Periódico	29 Mar 1998	800	**28.3**	20.5	–	–	–	–	51.2		7.8
Sigma Dos/El Mundo	26 Mar 1998	800	**30.9**	23.1	–	–	–	–	24.9	21.1	7.8
Demoscopia/El País	24–25 Mar 1998	1,200	**31.0**	29.0	–	–	–	–	40.0		2.0
ASEP	7–11 Jul 1997	1,214	7.7	3.3	**8.9**	3.1	1.1	1.0	3.4	71.7	1.2

== Results ==
=== Overall ===
Summary of the 24 April 1998 PSOE primary results
Candidate	Votes	%
Josep Borrell	114,254	55.04
Joaquín Almunia	92,860	44.73
Blank ballots	507	0.24
Total	207,567	
Valid votes	207,567	99.90
Invalid votes	207	0.10
Votes cast / turnout	207,774	54.18
Abstentions	175,688	45.82
Total members	383,462	

Vote by party members
Borrell	55.04%
Almunia	44.73%
Blank ballots	0.24%

=== By region ===
Region	Electorate	Turnout	Josep Borrell		Joaquín Almunia	
Region	Electorate	Turnout	Votes	%	Votes	%
Andalusia	107,650	52.25	24,516	43.59	31,554	56.10
Aragon	15,610	56.10	4,650	53.10	4,068	46.45
Asturias	10,270	65.94	4,583	67.68	2,180	32.19
Balearic Islands	3,813	54.50	1,171	56.35	895	43.07
Basque Country	9,176	61.19	2,746	48.90	2,845	50.67
Canary Islands	19,649	37.20	4,483	61.34	2,800	38.31
Cantabria	4,759	62.78	1,716	57.43	1,265	42.34
Castile and León	19,156	53.87	6,207	60.15	4,075	39.49
Castilla–La Mancha	26,902	62.34	6,076	36.23	10,628	63.37
Catalonia	28,947	62.34	14,925	82.71	3,050	16.90
Ceuta	507	35.50	108	60.00	72	40.00
Extremadura	21,339	57.50	6,752	55.03	5,471	44.59
Galicia	24,150	43.81	7,070	66.83	3,470	32.80
La Rioja	1,256	75.08	618	65.54	323	34.25
Madrid	21,968	54.95	7,894	65.39	4,112	34.06
Melilla	845	30.06	188	74.02	66	25.98
Murcia	20,889	46.35	5,192	53.63	4,465	46.12
Navarre	2,623	66.07	971	56.03	758	43.74
Valencian Community	39,376	60.02	13,875	58.71	9,701	41.05
Europe	1,294	48.07	231	37.14	386	62.06
Americas	3,209	28.30	282	31.06	622	68.50
Other	74	—N/a				
Total	383,462	54.18	114,254	54.99	92,806	44.67

== Aftermath ==
Against expectations of an Almunia victory, Borrell emerged as the clear winner in a shock result, with 55% of the votes to the former's 45%; his showing was particularly strong in his home region of Catalonia, where—despite the support given to Almunia by the leaders of the Socialist Party of Catalonia (PSC)—he won with over 80% of the votes, coming out on top in all autonomous communities but Andalusia, the Basque Country and Castilla–La Mancha.

The outcome of the primaries—with the defeat of the secretary-general and the party apparatus which had supported him—immediately plunged the party into uncertainty: convinced that the party's rank and file had voted not just for the prime ministerial nominee but also against his leadership, Almunia considered fulfilling his promise of tender his resignation, which would have triggered an extraordinary congress. A majority of party regional leaders, former leader Felipe González and Borrell himself urged Almunia not to resign in order to prevent an internal crisis, while fears of internal reprisal or political purges were dismissed.

As some sectors suggested a power-sharing agreement, both of them negotiated their future roles in the party structure. Borrell would become the PSOE's political and electoral leader as well as the new parliamentary opposition chief to Aznar's government, while Almunia would remain as secretary-general and the de jure leader of the party. These agreements paved the way for a "bicephaly" (duumvirate) situation in which both men would cohabitate the party's leadership with each other.

Borrell and Almunia would clash for months on their roles and the party's platform. Borrell would withdraw in May 1999 after it was unveiled that two former aides were involved in a judicial investigation for tax fraud, leaving a vacancy that resulted in Almunia being proclaimed as prime ministerial candidate without opposition. Almunia would went on to lose the 2000 general election, in which José María Aznar's People's Party (PP) would secure an absolute majority of seats. Almunia would later reveal that he made a mistake by not resigning as secretary-general following Borrell's victory and another one by accepting the party's nomination after the latter's withdrawal.

== Bibliography ==
- Sanz Díaz, Benito (2015). "Primarias en España. Se inicia la era posfelipista. 34 congreso PSOE. 1997. Almunia versus Borrell. 24 de abril de 1998". Elecciones primarias en España. 1993-2015 (in Spanish). Valencia: University of Valencia. hdl:10550/44646.
- Pascual Bueno, Ernesto M. (2016). Selección de Líderes y Candidatos a la Presidencia del Gobierno (1976-2016). "El jardín secreto del PSOE" (PDF) (PhD) (in Spanish). Barcelona: Universidad Autónoma de Barcelona.
- Ramiro, Luis (2016). "Effects of party primaries on electoral performance: The Spanish Socialist primaries in local elections". Party Politics. 22 (1). Sage Journals: 125–136. doi:10.1177/1354068813514884.
