= Joaquín Almunia =

Spanish politician (born 1948)

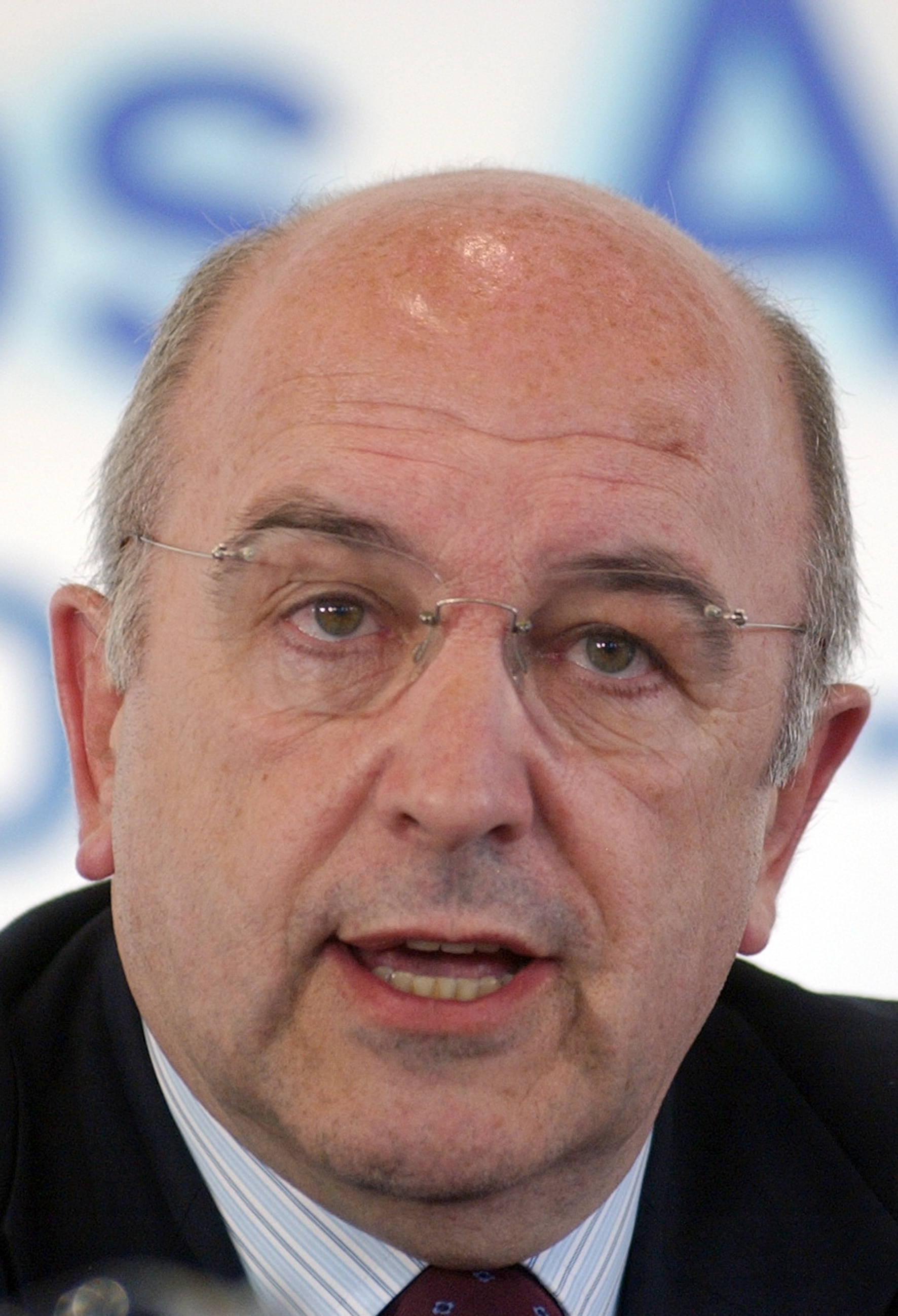
- Almunia in 2007

European Commissioner for Competition
- In office 9 February 2010 – 1 November 2014
- President: José Manuel Barroso
- Preceded by: Neelie Kroes
- Succeeded by: Margrethe Vestager

European Commissioner for Economic and Financial Affairs
- In office 24 April 2004 – 9 February 2010; Served with Siim Kallas
- President: Romano Prodi; José Manuel Barroso
- Preceded by: Pedro Solbes
- Succeeded by: Olli Rehn

Leader of the Opposition
- In office 14 May 1999 – 1 July 2000
- Prime Minister: José María Aznar
- Preceded by: Josep Borrell
- Succeeded by: José Luis Rodríguez Zapatero
- In office 22 June 1997 – 24 April 1998
- Prime Minister: José María Aznar
- Preceded by: Felipe González
- Succeeded by: Josep Borrell

Minister of Public Administrations
- In office 26 July 1986 – 12 March 1991
- Prime Minister: Felipe González
- Preceded by: Félix Pons Irazazábal
- Succeeded by: Juan Manuel Eguiagaray

Minister of Labor and Nacional Health Service
- In office 2 December 1982 – 26 July 1986
- Prime Minister: Felipe González
- Preceded by: Santiago Rodríguez Miranda
- Succeeded by: Manuel Chaves González

Personal details
- Born: Joaquín Almunia Amann; 17 June 1948 (age 78) Bilbao, Spain
- Party: Socialist Workers' Party
- Education: University of Deusto; Practical School for Advanced Studies

Joaquín Almunia Amann (born 17 June 1948) is a Spanish politician and former member of the European Commission. During his tenure in the two Barroso Commissions, he was European commissioner responsible for economic and monetary affairs (2004–2009) and, subsequently, vice-president and the European Commissioner for Competition (2009–2014).

Previously, he had been Spanish Minister for Employment (1982–1986) and Public Administrations (1986–1991). From 1997 to 2000, he was the leader of the opposition as secretary general of the Spanish Socialist Workers' Party, standing in and losing the 2000 Spanish general election against the then incumbent Spanish prime minister, José María Aznar.

== Early life and education ==
Born in Bilbao on 17 June 1948 to a bourgeois family, son to an engineer (father) of Valencian origin and a cultivated mother, daughter of a German physician of Jewish ancestry. His grandfather Isaac Amann was one of the promoters of the Bilbao–Getxo railway. Almunia attended the Jesuit School of Indautxu in Bilbao. He graduated with degrees in economics and law in 1971 and 1972, respectively, from the also Jesuit University of Deusto in Bilbao, and completed follow-up studies at the École pratique des hautes études in Paris, from 1970 to 1971. He also completed a program at the Harvard Kennedy School at Harvard University for senior managers in government in 1991. He was an associate lecturer on employment and social security law at the University of Alcalá de Henares from 1991 to 1994.

== Career ==
=== Parliamentary and government posts ===
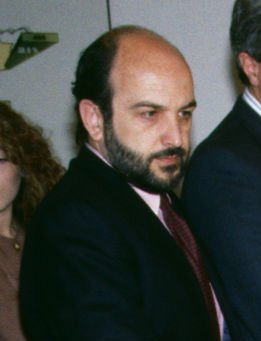
Almunia in May 1990

Almunia was chief economist of the Unión General de Trabajadores (UGT), a trade union linked to the Spanish Socialist Workers' Party (PSOE), from 1976 to 1979. He was economist at the Council Bureau of the Spanish Chambers of Commerce in Brussels from 1972 to 1975.

Almunia was a member of the Congress of Deputies from 1979 to 2004, representing Madrid. He served as Minister of Employment and Social Security of the Government of Spain from 1982 to 1986 and as Minister of Public Administration from 1986 to 1991. He was replaced by Juan Manuel Eguiagaray in the latter post. He was also the PSOE spokesperson from 1994 to 1997.

=== Socialist party leader ===
Upon the resignation of Felipe González after being defeated in the 1996 elections, the PSOE Convention (Congreso federal) appointed Almunia as the party leader (Secretary-General), a position he held from 1997 to 2000.

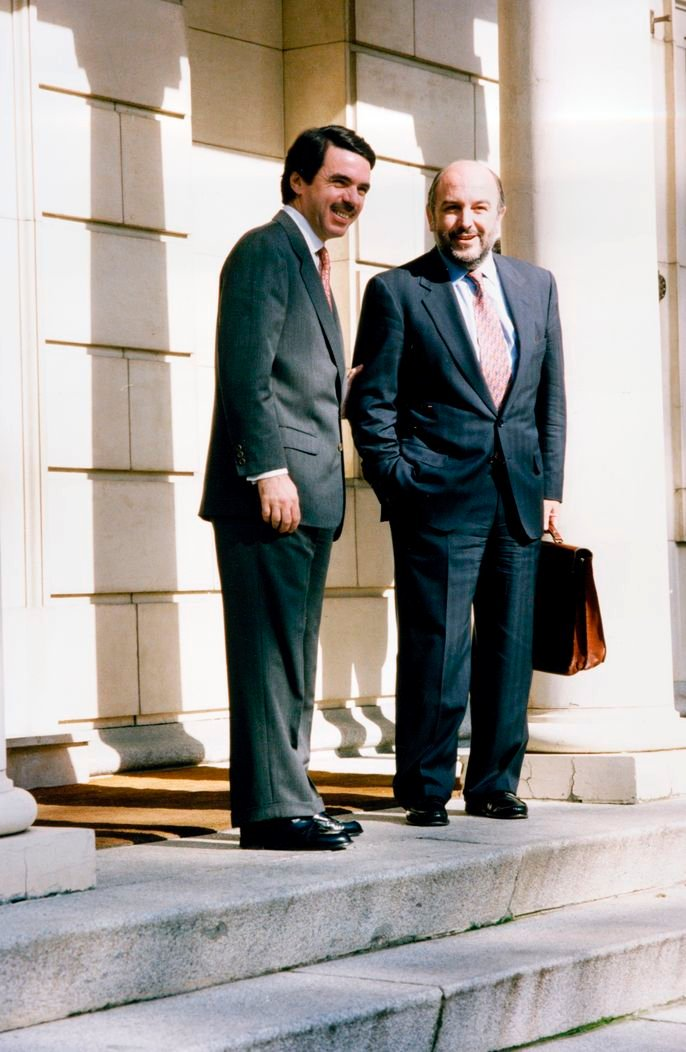
Almunia received by PM José María Aznar in 1997 at La Moncloa.

In 1998, fellow party member and former minister Josep Borrell decided to run against Almunia, in the first national primary election ever held in the PSOE since the Second Republic, intended to determine who the party would nominate as its prime ministerial candidate vis-à-vis the 2000 general election. Borrell ran as the underdog, campaigning as the candidate of the socialist base against the party establishment, which largely supported Almunia, including former Prime Minister González. Unexpectedly, Borrell won the primary election, commanding 114,254 of the member's votes (54.99%), versus the 92,860 (44.67%) obtained by Almunia. Thus began an uneasy relationship and power-sharing —the "bicefalia" (duumvirate)— between the official party leader, Almunia, and the prime ministerial candidate elected by the members in the primaries, Borrell. However, in May 1999, a fraud investigation affecting two former officials appointed by Borrell several years earlier while he was at the Ministry of Finance, led to his resignation as Prime Ministerial candidate.

In 2000, Almunia was therefore the PSOE candidate for prime minister. The party was again defeated by incumbent Prime Minister José María Aznar of the conservative PP, suffering its worst result in a general election since the Spanish transition to democracy, which resulted in an absolute majority for Aznar. As a result, Almunia resigned as PSOE leader.

Almunia was the director of the research program on "equality and redistribution of income" at the Fundación Argentaria from 1991 to 1994. In 2002 he founded and served as director of a progressive think tank called Laboratorio de Alternativas (Fundación Alternativas).

=== European Commissioner ===
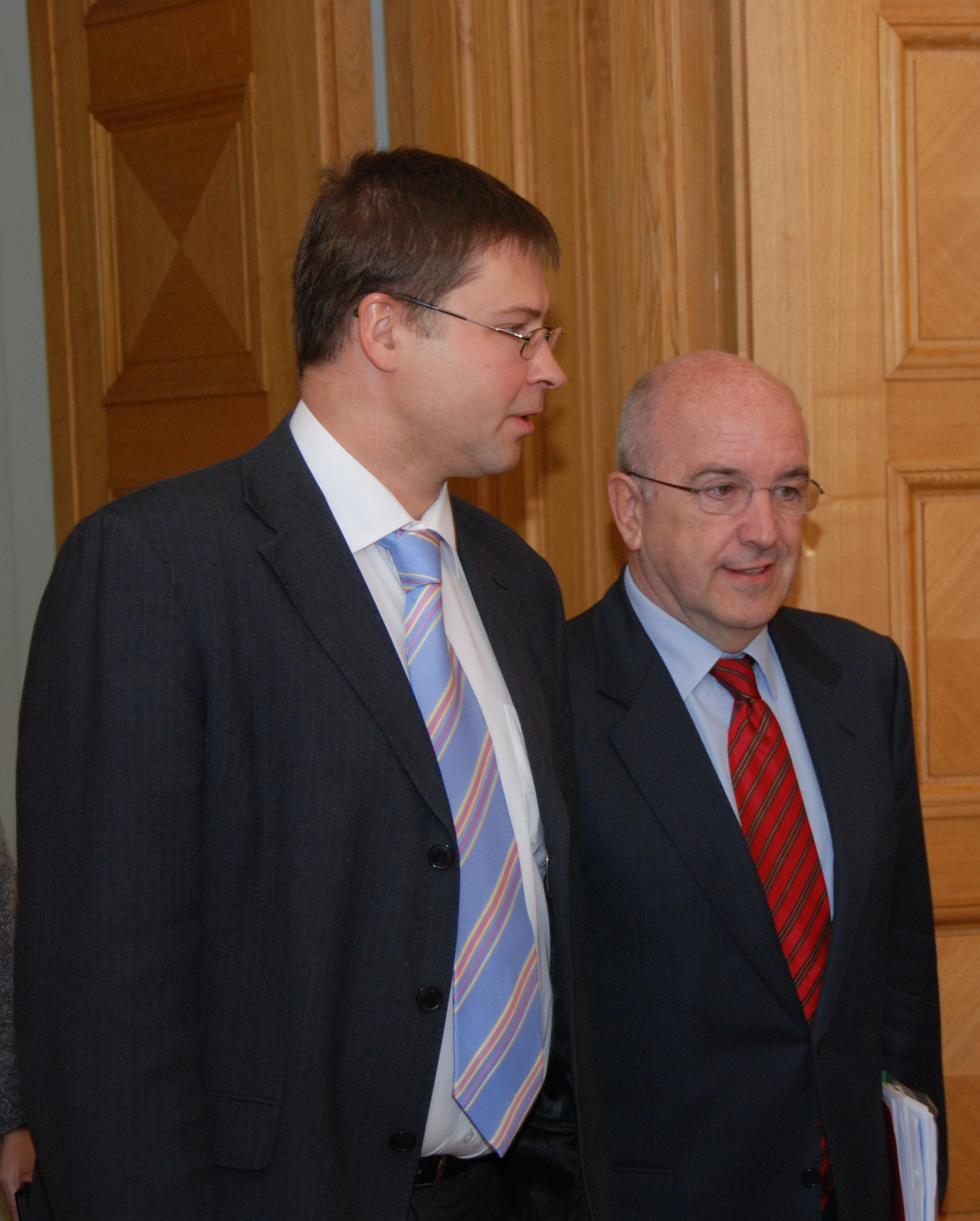
Almunia in October 2009 next to Latvian PM Valdis Dombrovskis.

He first joined the Prodi Commission on 26 April 2004 as a successor to Pedro Solbes (who had resigned to join the new Zapatero government) and was reappointed by Barroso in November 2004.

As EU Commissioner for Competition, Almunia was in charge of state aid and antitrust investigations relating to Google and to the tax planning practices of Apple, Starbucks and Fiat, as well as Amazon. The cases were wrapped up in 2016 by his successor Vestager and eventually closed by the CJEU in 2024, which upheld the Commission's decision.

He is an Honorary Fellow of St Edmund's College, Cambridge.

== Other activities ==
=== International organizations ===
- European Bank for Reconstruction and Development (EBRD), Ex-Officio Member of the Board of Governors (2004–2010)

=== Non-profit organizations ===
- Aristide Merloni Foundation, Member of the Scientific Council (since 2019)
- The European House – Ambrosetti, Member of the Scientific Committee for 'Building the Energy Union to Fuel European Growth' (2015)
- Centre for European Policy Studies (CEPS), Chairman
- Centre for European Reform, Member of the Advisory Board
- European Council on Foreign Relations (ECFR), Member
- European Policy Centre (EPC), Member of the Strategic Council
- Friends of Europe, Member of the Board of Trustees
- Jacques Delors Institute, Member of the Board of Directors

Political offices
| Preceded by Jesús Sancho Rof | Minister of Labor and Nacional Health Service; 1982–1986 | Succeeded by Manuel Chaves González |
| Preceded by Félix Pons Irazazábal | Minister of Public Administrations; 1986–1991 | Succeeded by Juan Manuel Eguiagaray |
| Preceded by Felipe González | Leader of the Opposition; 1997–2000 | Vacant Title next held by José Luis Rodríguez Zapatero |
| Preceded by Pedro Solbes | Spanish European Commissioner; 2004–2014 | Succeeded by Miguel Arias Cañete |
| Preceded by Pedro Solbes | European Commissioner for Economic and Monetary Affairs; 2004–2010; Served alongside: Siim Kallas | Succeeded by Olli Rehn |
| Preceded by Neelie Kroes | European Commissioner for Competition; 2010–2014 | Succeeded by Margrethe Vestager |
Party political offices
| Preceded by Carlos Solchaga | Leader of the Socialist Group in the Congress of Deputies; 1994–1997 | Succeeded by Juan Manuel Eguiagaray |
| Preceded by Felipe Gonzalez | Secretary General of the Spanish Socialist Workers' Party; 1997–2000 | Vacant Title next held by José Luis Rodríguez Zapatero |
