= Leader of the Opposition (Spain) =

Unofficial title held by the leader of the largest political party not in government

- Líder de la oposición
- Logo of the largest party in opposition

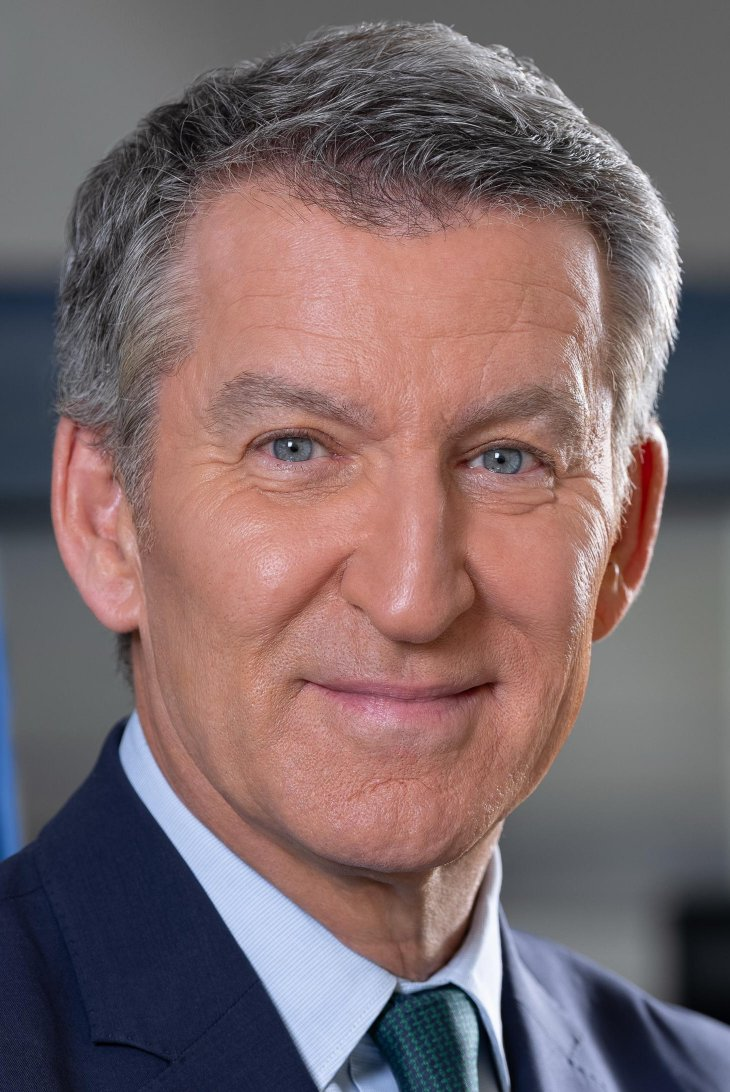
- Incumbent; Alberto Núñez Feijóo since 2 April 2022
- Residence: No official residence
- Appointer: None
- Term length: No fixed term
- Inaugural holder: Manuel Fraga
- Formation: 28 December 1982 (formally); 8 February 1983 (officially)

The leader of the opposition (Spanish: Líder de la oposición) is an unofficial, mostly conventional and honorary title frequently (but not exclusively) held by the leader of the largest party in the Congress of Deputies—the lower house of the Spanish parliament, the Cortes Generales—not within the government. They are usually the person who is expected to lead that party into the next general election.

From 31 October 2016 to 18 June 2017, the title was disputed between the two largest parties in the left, the Spanish Socialist Workers' Party (PSOE) and Podemos. The position was left nominally vacant after Mariano Rajoy's government was ousted in a motion of no confidence on 2 June 2018, until the election of Pablo Casado as new PP leader. From 23 February 2022, the position was again left vacant following the ousting of Casado by most of the leading members of his party, led by Galician and Madrilenian presidents Alberto Núñez Feijóo and Isabel Díaz Ayuso.

== Role ==
Not specifically provided legally, the workings of the post are mostly based on custom, protocol and convention. The term "leader of the opposition" is only legally recognized in a Royal Decree passed in 1983 establishing the order of preference of public authorities in general official acts organized by the Crown, Government or the State Administration, acknowledging the figure of Opposition Leader but only to put it in fifteenth place in the list of precedences.

By agreement of the Congress Bureau of 28 December 1982, Manuel Fraga was acknowledged as leader of the opposition by the PSOE government of Felipe González—himself having unofficially led opposition from 1977 to 1982. Such an agreement, further expanded on 8 February 1983, established a series of conditions for the role and awarded some prerogatives for the officeholder:

1. Determination of the person fulfilling the role of leader of the opposition must meet criteria of effective parliamentary number preeminence.
2. There must not be a formal appointment.
3. There is no need to raise compatibility issues for the role.
4. Must lack a full-blown salary, even if it may have a right to representation expenses, vehicle availability as well as the care provided for bureau members.

The leader of the opposition is entitled a special office in the Congress of Deputies if they are a member of the chamber. In addition, the officeholder usually receives much more attention from the media in parliamentary sessions and activities, such as in the yearly-held State of the Nation Debate. Established precedent has also led for the leader of the opposition usually sitting directly across from the prime minister in the Congress seating plan, so long as they have a seat in the Congress of Deputies. While it is not required for a leader of the opposition to have a seat in Congress, there have been only three occasions where the recognized officeholder did not have such a seat:

- Antonio Hernández Mancha (1987–1989), who had a seat in the Senate.
- Pedro Sánchez (2017–2018), who vacated his Congress seat after resigning as PSOE leader in October 2016 and remained unseated upon re-election.
- Alberto Núñez Feijóo (2022–2023) who served as President of the Regional Government of Galicia, subsequently, he had a seat in the Senate.

Even with the absence of a law defining the role of the opposition leader, it is customary to conduct update meetings between the prime minister and the chairman of the largest party not within the government. However, such meetings are carried out mostly at the prime minister's leisure.

== History ==
Before 1983, the figure served only as an informal reference to the "Leader of the Main Opposition Party", who at the time was Felipe González as leader of the Spanish Socialist Workers' Party, the main opposition party in Spain during the country's transition to democracy until 1982. The first recognized leader of the opposition was Manuel Fraga, who in February 1983 was granted such a formal status by the Congress of Deputies Bureau, despite the rejection of several parties.

On 1 December 1986, Manuel Fraga resigned as People's Alliance chairman and was replaced in the interim by Miguel Herrero de Miñón. While Herrero de Miñón served as interim AP leader until a party congress was held in February 1987, he was acknowledged as Opposition Leader on his own right. This lasted until he was defeated by Antonio Hernández Mancha in the 1987 AP congress, which prompted his resignation as the party's parliamentary speaker and leader on 8 February 1987. Hernández Mancha became leader of the opposition, but was hampered by the fact of him not being a deputy at the time.

In 1998, with the People's Party in government, Josep Borrell beat PSOE Secretary General Joaquín Almunia in a party primary to elect the party's candidate to prime minister in the subsequent general election. Almunia maintained his post as party leader whereas Borrell was named the party's spokesperson in Congress and was awarded leadership over the parliamentary party, with the later being officially referred to as the leader of the opposition. However, both Almunia and Borrell kept clashing on leadership issues for months—in a situation referred to as 'bicephaly'—until an agreement between the two parts definitely recognized Borrell the condition of opposition leader in November 1998. He would eventually resign as candidate in May 1999, awarding Almunia the sole and undisputed leadership over the party and opposition.

The office came again under dispute in 2016, days after a caretaker committee under Javier Fernández had taken control over PSOE as a result of a leadership crisis in October. Podemos' Pablo Iglesias subsequently self-proclaimed himself as new opposition leader on the basis of his party's strength in Congress being close to PSOE's—67 seats to 84. During Mariano Rajoy's second investiture debate on 27 October, Spanish media and parliamentarians informally acknowledged Iglesias the role of opposition leader by virtue of Rajoy addressing him as his main rival during a heated dialectical exchange, coupled with PSOE's perceived inability to exercise as opposition after choosing to allow Rajoy's election. The chaos ensuing from the vacancy in the PSOE leadership led to other parties not recognizing a formal opposition leader.

Pedro Sánchez nominally re-assumed the title once he was reelected as PSOE leader in June 2017, although he did not have a seat in parliament as a result of him resigning in protest to his party tolerating Rajoy's second government in October 2016. The position was left vacant after Mariano Rajoy was ousted as prime minister in a motion of no confidence on 2 June 2018—with Rajoy himself rejecting to assume the title again—, until the election of Pablo Casado as new PP leader. From 23 February 2022, the position was again left vacant following an internal PP rebellion, led by Galician and Madrilenian presidents Alberto Núñez Feijóo and Isabel Díaz Ayuso, that resulted in the downfall of Casado as party leader following his abandonment by most of his party's colleagues and other leading members.

== List of opposition leaders ==
Portrait	Name (Birth–Death)	Tenure			Party	Opposition to government	Election	Prime Minister (Tenure)
Portrait	Name (Birth–Death)	Start	End	Duration	Party	Opposition to government	Election	Prime Minister (Tenure)
	Manuel Fraga (1922–2012)	28 December 1982	24 July 1986	3 years and 338 days	AP	González I	1982	Felipe González (1982–1996)
	Manuel Fraga (1922–2012)	24 July 1986	1 December 1986	3 years and 338 days	AP	González II	1986	Felipe González (1982–1996)
Post vacant during this interval.						González II	1986	Felipe González (1982–1996)
	Miguel Herrero de Miñón (born 1940)	23 December 1986	8 February 1987	47 days	AP	González II	1986	Felipe González (1982–1996)
	Antonio Hernández Mancha (born 1951)	8 February 1987	20 January 1989 (Note: While Antonio Hernández Mancha remained AP's leader until 20 January 1989, he renounced contesting the leadership of the newly-established PP on 3 January 1989.)	1 year and 347 days	AP	González II	1986	Felipe González (1982–1996)
	Manuel Fraga (1922–2012)	20 January 1989	21 November 1989 (Note: While Manuel Fraga remained PP's leader until 1 April 1990, he renounced contesting the 1989 general election in favour of José María Aznar on 3 September 1989.)	305 days	PP	González II	1986	Felipe González (1982–1996)
	José María Aznar (born 1953)	21 November 1989 (Note: While José María Aznar led the PP parliamentary group in Congress in opposition from 21 November 1989, he did not become PP's leader until 1 April 1990.)	13 July 1993	6 years and 166 days	PP	González III	1989	Felipe González (1982–1996)
	José María Aznar (born 1953)	13 July 1993	5 May 1996	6 years and 166 days	PP	González IV	1993	Felipe González (1982–1996)
	Felipe González (born 1942)	5 May 1996	21 June 1997	1 year and 47 days	PSOE	Aznar I	1996	José María Aznar (1996–2004)
	Joaquín Almunia (born 1948)	21 June 1997	26 May 1998	339 days	PSOE	Aznar I	1996	José María Aznar (1996–2004)
	Josep Borrell (born 1947)	26 May 1998 (Note: Josep Borrell became the PSOE candidate for prime minister in a party primary held on 24 April 1998 and was appointed as PSOE's spokesperson in Congress on 26 May, but Joaquín Almunia retained the party's leadership.)	14 May 1999	353 days	PSOE	Aznar I	1996	José María Aznar (1996–2004)
	Joaquín Almunia (born 1948)	14 May 1999	12 March 2000	303 days	PSOE	Aznar I	1996	José María Aznar (1996–2004)
Post vacant during this interval.						Aznar II	2000	José María Aznar (1996–2004)
	José Luis Rodríguez Zapatero (born 1960)	22 July 2000	17 April 2004	3 years and 270 days	PSOE	Aznar II	2000	José María Aznar (1996–2004)
	Mariano Rajoy (born 1955)	17 April 2004 (Note: While Mariano Rajoy led the PP parliamentary group in Congress in opposition from 17 April 2004, he did not become PP's leader until 2 October 2004.)	12 April 2008	7 years and 248 days	PP	Zapatero I	2004	José Luis; Rodríguez Zapatero (2004–2011)
	Mariano Rajoy (born 1955)	12 April 2008	21 December 2011	7 years and 248 days	PP	Zapatero II	2008	José Luis; Rodríguez Zapatero (2004–2011)
	Alfredo Pérez Rubalcaba (1951–2019)	21 December 2011 (Note: While Alfredo Pérez Rubalcaba led the PSOE parliamentary group in Congress in opposition from 21 December 2011, he did not become PSOE's leader until 4 February 2012.)	26 July 2014	2 years and 217 days	PSOE	Rajoy I	2011	Mariano Rajoy (2011–2018)
	Pedro Sánchez (born 1972)	26 July 2014	1 October 2016	2 years and 67 days	PSOE	Rajoy I	2011	Mariano Rajoy (2011–2018)
	Pedro Sánchez (born 1972)	26 July 2014	1 October 2016	2 years and 67 days	PSOE	Rajoy I	2015	Mariano Rajoy (2011–2018)
Post vacant during this interval.						Rajoy II	2016	Mariano Rajoy (2011–2018)
	Pedro Sánchez (born 1972)	18 June 2017	2 June 2018	349 days	PSOE	Rajoy II	2016	Mariano Rajoy (2011–2018)
	Mariano Rajoy (born 1955)	2 June 2018	21 July 2018 (Note: While Mariano Rajoy remained as PP's leader until 21 July 2018, he announced his resignation from the post on 5 June 2018.)	49 days	PP	Sánchez I	2016	Pedro Sánchez (2018–present)
	Pablo Casado (born 1981)	21 July 2018	8 January 2020	3 years and 255 days	PP	Sánchez I	2016	Pedro Sánchez (2018–present)
	Pablo Casado (born 1981)	21 July 2018	8 January 2020	3 years and 255 days	PP	Sánchez I	Apr. 2019	Pedro Sánchez (2018–present)
	Pablo Casado (born 1981)	8 January 2020	2 April 2022 (Note: While Pablo Casado remained PP's leader until 2 April 2022, he renounced contesting the party leadership on 23 February 2022.)	3 years and 255 days	PP	Sánchez II	Nov. 2019	Pedro Sánchez (2018–present)
	Alberto Núñez Feijóo (born 1961)	2 April 2022	17 November 2023	4 years and 158 days	PP	Sánchez II	Nov. 2019	Pedro Sánchez (2018–present)
	Alberto Núñez Feijóo (born 1961)	17 November 2023	Incumbent	4 years and 158 days	PP	Sánchez III	2023	Pedro Sánchez (2018–present)

== See also ==
- Prime Minister of Spain
- List of political parties in Spain
- Congress of Deputies
