= Secretary of State for Universities and Research =

Secretary of State for Science, Innovation and Universities
- Secretario de Estado de Ciencia, Innovación y Universidades
- Coat of Arms used by the Government

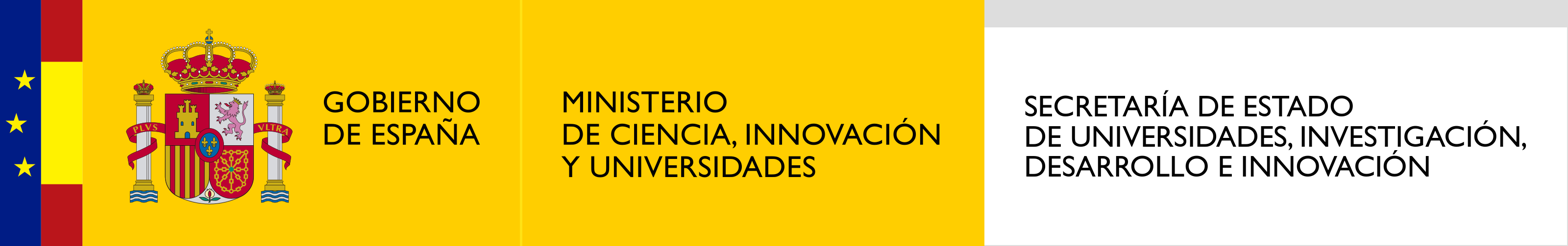

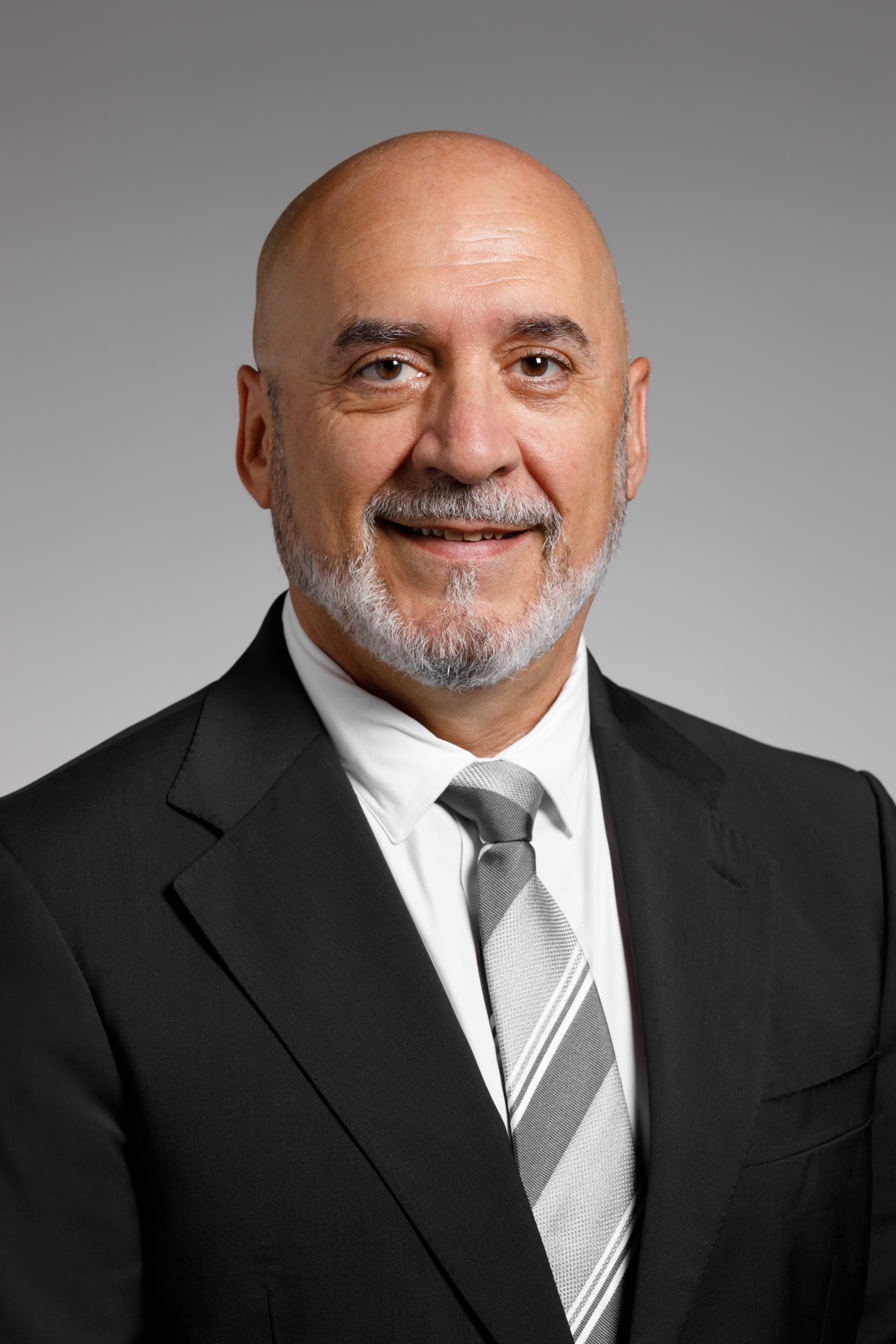
- Incumbent; Juan Cruz Cigudosa since 8 December 2023
- Ministry of Science, Innovation and Universities; Secretariat of State for Science, Innovation and Universities
- Style: The Most Excellent (formal); Madam Secretary of State (informal)
- Reports to: Science Minister
- Nominator: Science Minister
- Appointer: The Monarch
- Precursor: Director-General for Universities; Director-General for Scientific Policy
- Formation: July 4, 1977; 49 years ago
- First holder: Luis González Seara
- Website: ciencia.gob.es

The Secretary of State for Science, Innovation and Universities, known in its early years as Secretary of State for Universities and Research, is the second highest office of the Ministry of Science, Innovation and Universities of the Government of Spain. The Secretary of State is appointed by the Monarch on the advice of the Science Minister.

As the second highest office of the Ministry, the Secretary of State is responsible for the direction of the responsibilities assigned to the Ministry over science, R&D&I and universities. The Secretary of State designs and directs, in coordination with the Secretary of State for Education, the scholarship and study aid programs and coordinated the efforts of the different Spanish public administrations and the European institutions.

The Secretary of State also takes care of the well administration and distribution of the European Union funds destined to universities, science and research and it secures the equal and universal access and no discrimination to universities and science with special attention to the role of women in this area.

Because of his position, the Secretary of State is also the president of the State Research Agency and the Centre for the Development of Industrial Technology.

== History ==
The Secretariat of State was created for the first time in 1977 with the name of Secretariat of State for Universities and Innovation and was integrated in the Ministry of Education and Science but it was soon replaced by the Ministry of Universities and Science created in 1979. This ministry was suppressed in 1981 and the secretariat of state was activated again and integrated in the Ministry of Education.

The significant modification happened in 2000. During the Second Aznar Government, the Ministry of Science and Technology was created and assumed the competences over R&D&I and science, but the competences over universities were maintained in the Ministry of Education. At this time, the Secretary of State for Education assumed the competences over universities and in the Ministry of Science was created the Secretariat of State for Scientific and Technological Policy.

In 2004, the Prime Minister José Luis Rodríguez Zapatero merged the Ministry of Education and the Ministry of Science and the Secretariat of State for Universities and Research was created again. In his second government, Zapatero revived the Ministry of Science but split the secretariat of state in two. In 2009 the Secretariat of State for Universities was suppressed and all its competences were assumed by the General Secretariat of Universities in the Ministry of Education.

In 2012, the new government of Mariano Rajoy continued with the major austerity plan started by Zapatero to improve the economy which started with the reduction of dozens of high-ranking officials. This provoked that disappearance of the Ministry of Science and most of its competences were granted to the Ministry of Economy, which had as one of its major departments the Secretariat of State for Research, Development and Innovation. The General Secretariat for Universities was also eliminated and its competences were assumed, once again, by the Secretary of State for Education.

Once that the crisis was over, the change of government in 2018 it brought with it the enlargement of the State Administration with the creation of new ministerial departments like the Ministry of Science, that assumed its old competences.

== Names ==
- Secretary of State for Universities and Research (1977–1979; 1981–1996; 2004–2008)
- Secretary of State for Universities, Research and Innovation (1996–2000)
- Secretary of State for Education and Universities (2000–2004)
- Secretary of State for Scientific and Technological Policy (2000–2004)
- Secretary of State for Universities and Research (2004–2008).
- Secretary of State for Universities (2008–2009)
- Secretary of State for Research (2008–2011)
- Secretary of State for Research, Development and Innovation (2011–2018).
- Secretary of State for Education, Vocational Training and Universities (2011–2018).
- Secretary of State for Universities, Research, Development and Innovation (2018–2020)
- Secretary of State for Science, Innovation and Universities (2023–)

== Structure ==
To carry out its duties, the Secretariat of State is divided in five major departments and two non-ministerial bodies:

- The General Secretariat for Research.
  It is the department responsible for the promotion of R&D&I, the promotion of the Spanish participation in the European Union R&D&I programs and the scientific divulgation. It also supervises all the scientific institutions of the country.
- The General Secretariat for Universities.
  It is a department that has a long history inside of the Administration and that sometimes was granted with autonomy. It's the highest university body responsible for developing the university policy, it elaborates regulation drafts and it promotes the scientific collaboration in universities in coordination with the General Secretariat for Research.
- The General Secretariat for Innovation.
  It is the department responsible for innovation and knowledge transfer.
  The General Secretariat for Innovation is divided in three departments: the Deputy Directorate-General for Innovation Promotion, the Deputy Directorate-General for Innovation Coordination and aTechnical Cabinet.
- The Directorate-General for Planning, Coordination and Knowledge Transfer.
- The Special Commissioner for Vanguard Health.

Along with the mentioned departments, the Secretariat of State is the directly responsible of the State Research Agency and the Centre for the Development of Industrial Technology.

== List of state secretaries ==
Image	Name	Term of office			Ministers serving under	Prime Minister
Image	Name	Began	Ended	Days of service	Ministers serving under	Prime Minister
	Luis González Seara	13 July 1977	6 January 1979	542	Íñigo Cavero	Adolfo Suárez
Competences assumed by Luis González Seara as Minister of Universities and Research between 1979 and 1981
	Manuel Cobo del Rosal	16 March 1981	21 December 1981	280	Juan Antonio Ortega y Díaz-Ambrona	Leopoldo Calvo-Sotelo
	Saturnino de la Plaza Pérez	21 December 1981	8 December 1982	352	Federico Mayor Zaragoza	Leopoldo Calvo-Sotelo
	Carmina Virgili	8 December 1982	4 May 1985	878	José María Maravall	Felipe González
	Juan Manuel Rojo Alaminos	4 May 1985	1 August 1992	2646	José María Maravall Javier Solana	Felipe González
	Elías Fereres Castiel	1 August 1992	13 September 1994	773	Alfredo Pérez Rubalcaba Gustavo Suárez Pertierra	Felipe González
	Emilio Octavio de Toledo y Ubieto	13 September 1994	2 October 1995	384	Gustavo Suárez Pertierra Jerónimo Saavedra	Felipe González
	Enric Banda Tarradellas	2 October 1995	11 May 1996	222	Jerónimo Saavedra	Felipe González
	Fernando Tejerina García	11 May 1996	12 July 1997	427	Esperanza Aguirre	José María Aznar
	Manuel Jesús González González	12 July 1997	23 January 1999	560	Esperanza Aguirre	José María Aznar
	Jorge Fernández Díaz	23 January 1999	6 May 2000	469	Mariano Rajoy	José María Aznar
	Julio Iglesias de Ussel; Secretary of State for Education and Universities	6 May 2000	20 April 2004	1445	Pilar del Castillo	José María Aznar
	Ramón Marimón Suñol; Secretary of State for Scientific and Technological Policy	6 May 2000	3 August 2002	819	Anna Birulés	José María Aznar
	Pedro Morenés; Secretary of State for Scientific and Technological Policy	3 August 2002	20 April 2004	626	Josep Piqué	José María Aznar
	Salvador Ordoñez Delgado	20 April 2004	6 May 2006	746	María Jesús San Segundo	José Luis Rodríguez Zapatero
	Miguel Ángel Quintanilla	6 May 2006	16 April 2008	711	María Jesús San Segundo	José Luis Rodríguez Zapatero
	Carlos Martínez Alonso; Secretary of State for Research	15 April 2008	5 December 2009	599	Cristina Garmendia	José Luis Rodríguez Zapatero
	Márius Rubiralta i Alcañiz; Secretary of State for Universities	21 April 2008	25 April 2009	369	Cristina Garmendia	José Luis Rodríguez Zapatero
University competences assumed by the General Secretary of Universities between 2009 and 2011						José Luis Rodríguez Zapatero
	Felipe Pétriz Calvo; Secretary of State for Research	5 December 2009	24 December 2011	749	Cristina Garmendia	José Luis Rodríguez Zapatero
	Carmen Vela; Secretary of State for Research, Development and Innovation	31 December 2011	19 June 2018	2362	Luis de Guindos	Mariano Rajoy
	Montserrat Gomendio; Secretary of State for Education, Vocational Training and Universities	14 January 2012	4 July 2015	1267	José Ignacio Wert	Mariano Rajoy
	Marcial Marín Hellín; Secretary of State for Education, Vocational Training and Universities	4 July 2015	19 June 2018	1081	Íñigo Méndez de Vigo	Mariano Rajoy
	Ángeles Heras Caballero	19 June 2018	15 January 2020	575	Pedro Duque	Pedro Sánchez
	Juan Cruz Cigudosa	8 December 2023	Incumbent	1004	Diana Morant	Pedro Sánchez

The coloured secretaries of state hadn't all the competences described in this article.
