= General Secretariat for Research =

Spanish government department

- Secretaría General de Investigación
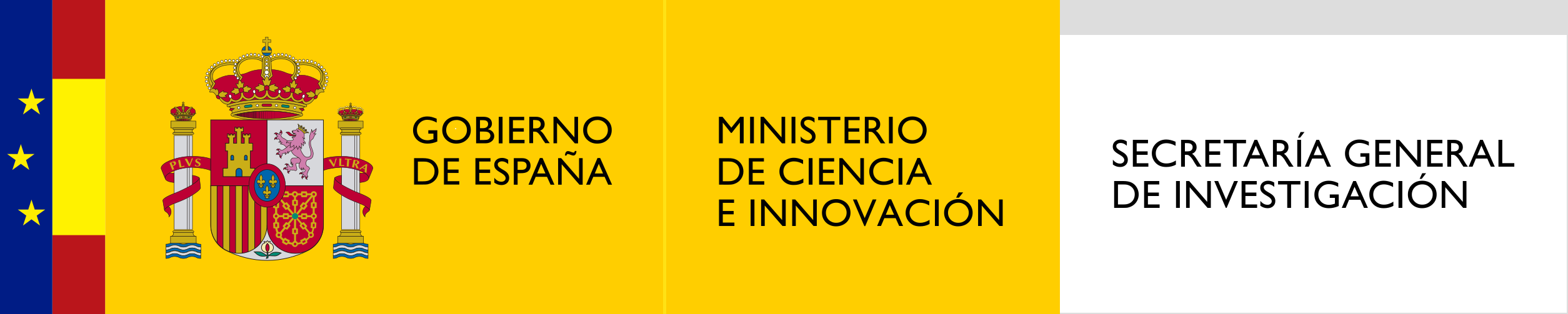
- General secretariat's logo

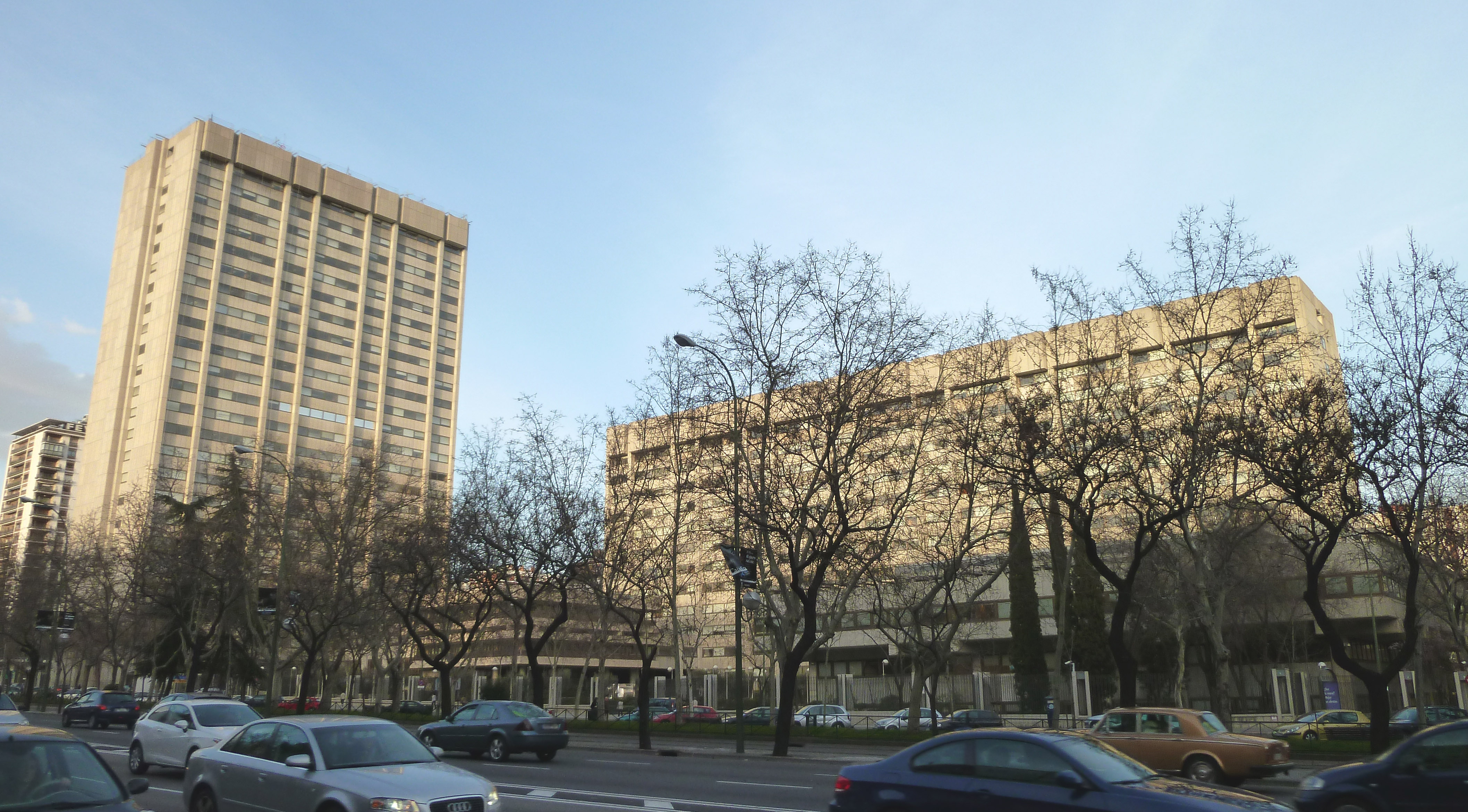
- Main Headquarters of the Ministry of Science, Innovation and Universities in Madrid.

Agency overview
- Formed: May 12, 2000; 26 years ago
- Preceding agency: General Secretariat of the National Plan for Scientific Research and Technological Development
- Type: General Secretariat
- Jurisdiction: Government of Spain
- Headquarters: 162 Paseo de la Castellana; Madrid
- Annual budget: € 2.7 billion
- Agency executive: Rafael Rodrigo Montero, Secretary-General
- Parent department: Ministry of Science and Innovation

The General Secretariat for Research (Spanish: Secretaría General de Investigación, SGI) is a component of the Spanish Department of Science and Innovation responsible for promoting the Spanish scientific research, as well as coordinating the different organizations and administrations that are part of it. The general secretariat's budget for 2019 was €2.697 billion.

The general secretariat is headed by a Secretary-General, an undersecretary-rank official appointed by the Monarch with the advice of the Science Minister. The Secretary-General chairs the Spanish Polar Committee and is assisted by a Technical Cabinet, a director-general and a deputy director-general. The general secretariat supervises several scientific agencies owned by the central government. The current Secretary-General is Rafael Rodrigo Montero, an astrophysicist who served as President of the CSIC from 2008 to 2012.

== History ==
The origins of the general secretariat dates back to the beginning of the second term of the premiership of José María Aznar in May 2000. Prior to this reform, between 1976 and 1986 the Directorate-General for Scientific Policy assumed the responsibilities of scientific coordination and promotion and between 1986 and 1995 this task corresponded to the Directorate-General for Scientific and Technical Research and, from that year until the 2000 reform, to the General Secretariat of the National Plan for Scientific Research and Technological Development.

With the 2000 ministerial reform, the General Secretariat for Scientific Policy was created, whose main objective was the "coordination of the actions related to the large scientific facilities of a state nature". The general secretariat was integrated in the Secretariat of State for Scientific and Technological Policy.

After the 2004 general election, the new government of José Luis Rodríguez Zapatero merged the departments of Education and of Science and renamed the general secretariat as General Secretariat for Scientific and Technological Policy. The general secretariat was integrated by the Directorate-General for Research and the Directorate-General for Technological Policy. In 2008 it was re-created the Ministry of Science and in 2009 the general secretariat was abolished and its powers divided into several new organs.

In 2012, the Department of Science was abolished and its powers merged into the Ministry of Economy which recovered the general secretariat under the name of General Secretariat for Science, Technology and Innovation. In 2015, the creation of the State Research Agency supposed a re-organization of powers and the general secretariat was renamed as General Secretariat for Science and Innovation.

In June 2018, the new government renamed the general secretariat as General Secretariat for Scientific Policy Coordination and it made it directly dependent on the Minister in order to boost the scientific research. The organ was integrated in the recovered Ministry of Science.

In January 2020, the general secretariat was renamed again and a Directorate-General for Research Planning was created.

== List of secretaries-general ==
- Juan Junquera González (2000–2002) (1)
- Félix Ynduráin Muñoz (January–September 2002) (1)
- Gonzalo León Serrano (2002–2004) (1)
- Salvador Barberà Sández (2004–2006) (2)
- Francisco José Marcellán Español (2006–2008) (2)
- José Manuel Fernández de Labastida y del Olmo (2008–2009) (2)
- Román Arjona Gracia (2012–2013) (3)
- María Luisa Poncela García (2013–2016) (3)(4)
- Juan María Vázquez Rojas (2016–2018) (4)
- Rafael Rodrigo Montero (2018–present) (5)(6)

(1) Secretary-General for Scientific Policy.
(2) Secretary-General for Scientific and Technological Policy.
(3) Secretary-General for Science, Technology and Innovation.
(4) Secretary-General for Science and Innovation.
(5) Secretary-General for Scientific Policy Coordination.
(6) Secretary-General for Research

== Organization chart ==
The General Secretariat is integrated by three main organs through which it exercises its powers and a technical assistance cabinet:

- The Technical Cabinet as an organ of support and immediate assistance to the Secretary-General.
- The Directorate-General for Research Planning, responsible for promoting and coordinating the scientific and cultural research, for promoting the participation in the R&D programs promoted by the European Union and other international programs relevant for the Spanish scientific community, and for the international representation of the Department and other agencies. It is also responsible for strategic planning, coordination, monitoring and representation of large national scientific-technical facilities along with the Spanish regions, and strategic planning, coordination, monitoring and representation of actions related to large scientific facilities of a state ownership. It also represents those facilities in the international sphere and it manages the Operational Programs co-financed by european funds. In addition, it is responsible for providing the necessary collaboration and assistance that the Spanish Polar Committee may require for the proper exercise of its powers.
- The Deputy Directorate-General for Coordination of Public Research Agencies, which is responsible for promoting, developing and coordinating the activities of the public research agencies attached to the SGCPC, including especially staff management.

== Agencies ==
Agency	Official	Creation	HQ/Main HQ	Website
National Museum of Science and Technology	Marina Martínez de Marañón Yanguas, Director	1980	61 Paseo de las Delicias, Madrid	www.muncyt.es
Spanish National Research Council	Rosa María Menéndez López, President	1939	117 Serrano Street, Madrid	www.csic.es
Carlos III Health Institute	Raquel Yotti Álvarez, Director	1986	On the outskirts of Madrid	www.isciii.es
National Institute for Agricultural and Food Research and Technology	Esther Esteban Rodrigo, Director	1971	Coruña Road, km 7.5, Madrid	www.inia.es
Research Centre for Energy, Environment and Technology	Carlos Alejaldre Losilla, Director-General	1986	40 Complutense Avenue, Madrid	www.ciemat.es
Spanish Institute of Oceanography	Eduardo Balguerías Guerra, Director	1914	8 Corazón de María Street, Madrid	www.ieo.es
Geological and Mining Institute of Spain	Francisco González Lodeiro, Director	1849	23 Ríos Rosas Street, Madrid	www.igme.es
Canary Islands Institute of Astrophysics	Rafael Rebolo López, Director	1975	Milky Way Street, La Laguna	www.iac.es
State Research Agency	Enrique Playán Jubillar, Director	2015	Madrid	
