= Ministry of Science (Spain) =

Spanish ministry for science and innovation

Ministry of Science, Innovation and Universities
- Ministerio de Ciencia, Innovación y Universidades

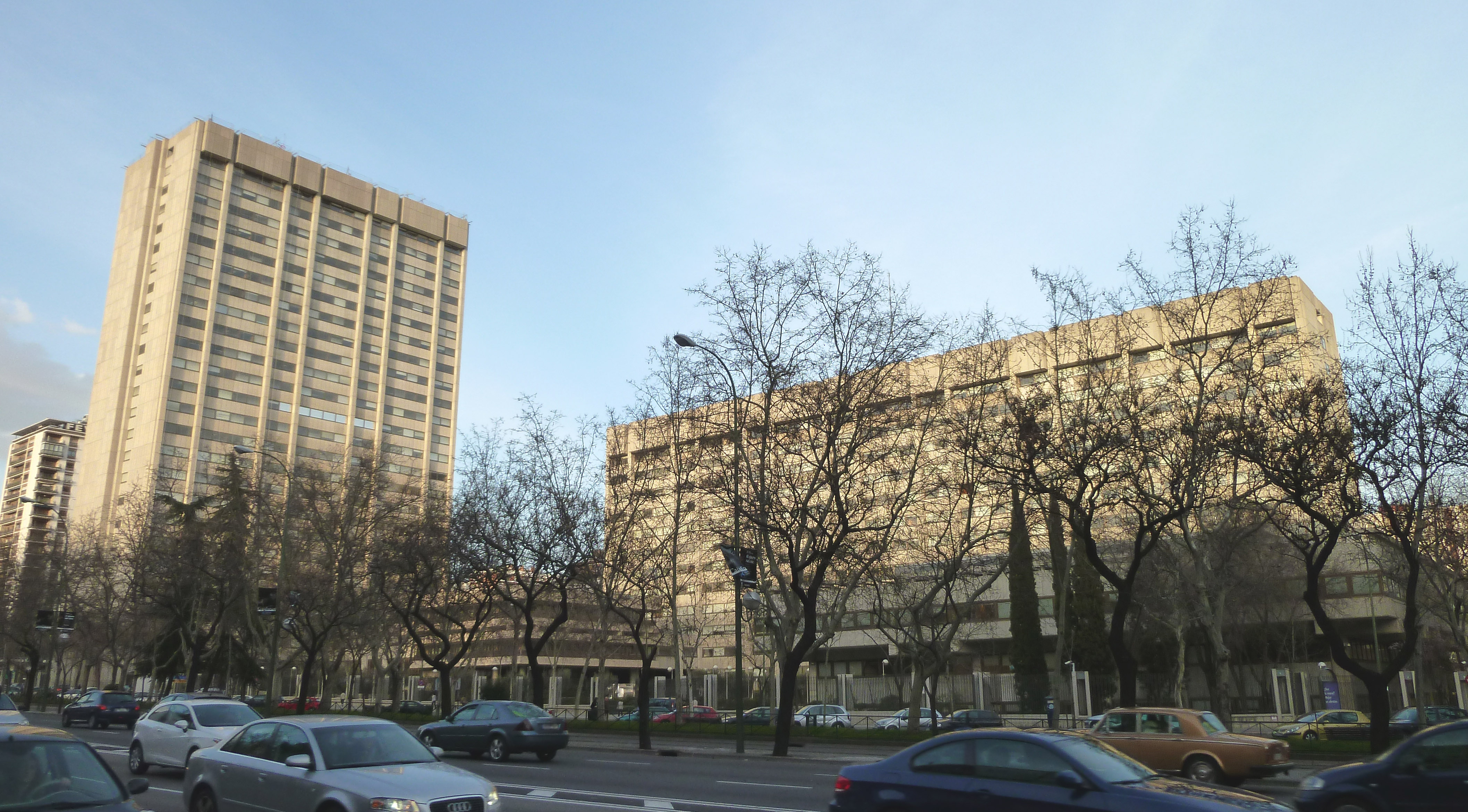
- Headquarters of the Ministry of Science

Agency overview
- Formed: April 5, 1979; 47 years ago (as Ministry of Universities and Research)
- Preceding agency: Ministry of Education and Science (before 1979)
- Type: Ministry
- Jurisdiction: Government of Spain
- Headquarters: Paseo de la Castellana, 162 Madrid, Spain
- Employees: 23,475 (2023) (Note: It includes the number of employes of the UNED. In the other hand, Spain has more than 230,000 university employees although universities are independent.)
- Annual budget: €8.2 billion, 2026
- Minister responsible: Mrs. Diana Morant, Minister
- Agency executives: Juan Cruz Cigudosa, Secretary of State; Eva Ortega Paíno, Secretary-General for Research; Francisco García Pascual, Secretary-General for Universities; Teresa Riesgo Alcaide, Secretary-General for Innovation; Carlos Marco Estellés, Under-Secretary
- Website: Ministry of Science (in spanish)

The Ministry of Science, Innovation and Universities (MICIU) is the department of the Government of Spain responsible for developing and implementing the government policy on scientific research, technological development and innovation in all sectors. The MICIU is also responsible for the space and university policies and it represents Spain before the European Union and other international organizations within its competence, in coordination with the Ministry of Foreign Affairs.

In Spain, the General State Administration and the regions share the responsibilities in the promotion of scientific and technical research, with the State being responsible for general coordination in this area. In this regard, the Constitutional Court has reiterated its doctrine in relation to State coordination, denying that it can reach such a degree of specificity and development that it leaves the powers of the Spanish regions empty of content, and a balance of powers must be guaranteed. This coordination is carried out through the Scientific, Technological and Innovation Policy Council (CPCTI).

With regard to university education, and respecting the autonomy of universities, the Ministry of Science establishes the university policy and defines the framework for the creation and recognition of universities, as well as official degrees, while the regions develop the regulations and ensure their compliance. To coordinate all actors involved, the Ministry has a General Conference on University Policy and a University Council.

The department was first created in 1979, together with the Ministry of Territorial Policy, and has existed independently in four different stages. It is headed by the Minister of Science, a Cabinet position appointed by the Monarch on the advice of the Prime Minister. The current minister is Diana Morant since 2021.

== History ==
=== Early years ===
Historically, cultural and scientific responsibilities were assumed directly by the Spanish monarchs, both through private commissions and the creation of scientific and cultural institutions such as the royal academies. However, over time, these responsibilities were delegated to the various government departments that were created from the 18th century onwards to manage increasingly complex administrative apparatus. Thus, from the beginning of this century, the Secretariats of State and of the Office assumed these responsibilities, first the Secretariat of Justice and then the Secretariat of the Interior.

After the creation of the Ministry of Development in 1847, these responsibilities were unified under this new department, closely linked to everything related to education, which is why, both in the project of the Ministry of Public Instruction of 1886 and in the definitive creation of this Ministry in 1900, these powers were part of the new ministry.

==== Evolution of science in the administration ====
Throughout the 20th century, the Ministry of Education assumed responsibility for scientific matters. Initially, these responsibilities were assigned to the Ministry's under-secretary, through sections such as those for Universities and Institutes, and Fine Arts.

Over time, the number and rank of these bodies increased, with the establishment of some new ones such as the Directorate-General for Fine Arts in 1915, and the first organizations for the promotion of scientific research were created, as was the case of the Board for the Extension of Studies and Scientific Research (Spanish: Junta para Ampliación de Estudios e Investigaciones Científicas, JAE) in 1907, promoted by The Count of Gimeno, Minister of Education, and led by Nobel Prize winner Santiago Ramón y Cajal until his death in 1934. The JAE created dozens of laboratories, research centers and gave hundreds of scholarships for research abroad as well as connecting intellectuals from Spain and the rest of Europe. This Board was replaced in 1939 by the current Spanish National Research Council (CSIC), which has since been the main scientific organization in Spain.

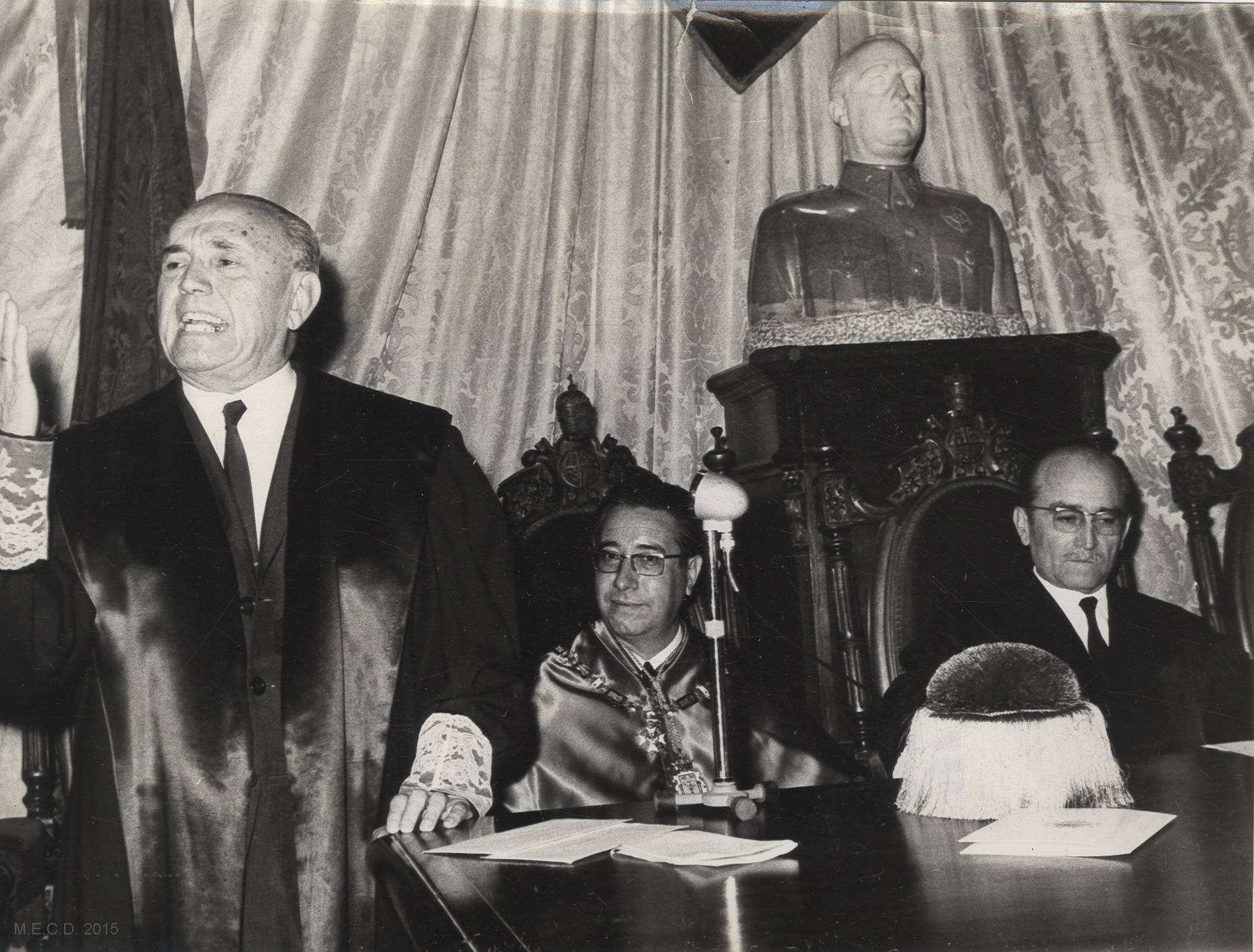
The Minister of Education and Science, Villar Palasí (center), at an event at the University of Oviedo. 1970s

In 1938, the Institute of Spain was founded to group and coordinate the activity of the existing royal academies and, twenty years later, the Advisory Committee on Scientific and Technical Research was created, attached to the Office of the Prime Minister, to promote and modernize Spanish science policy.

Following this trend, the importance of science was such that in 1966 the Ministry of Education itself was renamed as "Ministry of Education and Science", science policies were implemented through more specialized administrative bodies, such as the Directorate-General for Higher Education and Research. Towards the end of this period, this directorate-general focused solely on higher education and, in 1976, an independent directorate-general for science was created, the Directorate-General for Scientific Policy.

At the end of the 1970s, other organizations were created, such as the Canary Islands Institute of Astrophysics and the Centre for Industrial Technological Development, and the scientific-university responsibilities were once more elevated in rank with the creation of the position of Secretary of State for Universities and Research in 1977.

=== First Ministry of Science ===
1979 was a key year for science policy in Spain. In this year, the Ministry of Universities and Research was created, the first independent science ministry, which assumed the Ministry of Education and Science's powers exercised through the Secretariat of State for Universities and Research, which was abolished, as well as the directorates-general for Universities and Scientific Policy, the CSIC, the Institute of Spain, and the Advisory Commission for Scientific and Technical Research, which until then had been under the Prime Minister's Office.

This department only lasted two years, being abolished in February 1981 and its functions returning to the Department of Education. When the four rectors of Madrid's universities were asked about the elimination of the ministry, their opinions differed. Francisco Bustelo (UCM) considered it a setback, while Rafael Portaencasa (UPM) and Tomás Ramón Fernández (UNED) saw no major problem. Pedro Martínez Montávez (UAM) declined to comment, believing the ministry had no time to develop its policies. All four did agree on the importance of maintaining the budget and the potential influence of the reinstated Secretariat of State for Universities and Research.

During its existence, noteworthy events included the creation of the psychology faculties in 1979, the founding of the Royal Academy of Letters and Arts of Extremadura, and the transformation of the Menéndez Pelayo International University (UIMP) into an autonomous agency, the latter in 1980. Also in that year, the National Museum of Science and Technology (MUNCYT) was created, at that time dependent on the Ministry of Culture, and the Nuclear Safety Council (CSN) was established, an independent agency that partially replaced the Nuclear Energy Board (JEN) in its functions of control and guarantee of nuclear safety and radiological protection.

==== 1986 Science Law ====
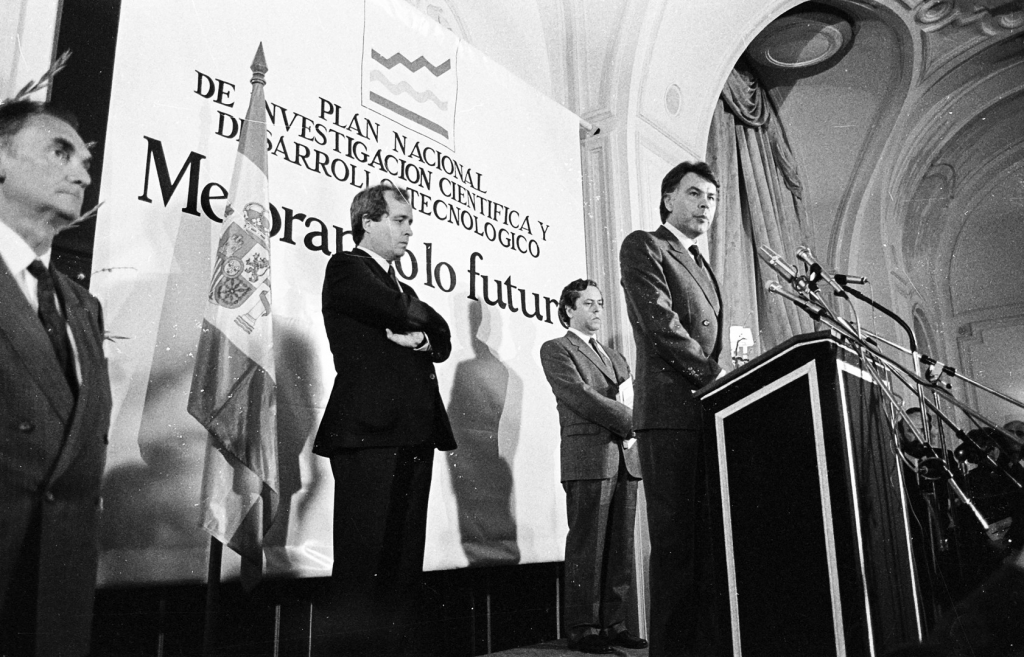
Felipe González and José María Maravall presenting the National Plan for Scientific Research and Technological Development. 1988

During the interregnum that followed the elimination of the ministry and, after criticism from prestigious Spanish scientists such as Nobel Prize winner Severo Ochoa due to the passivity of Spanish institutions in relation to science, the first science law was approved, Law 13/1986, of April 14, on the Promotion and General Coordination of Scientific and Technical Research, which established, for the first time, a permanent scientific and technological policy in Spain.

Thanks to this law, the country went from contributing 0.3 % to world scientific knowledge in 1981 to 3.1 % in 2003. Also, this norm reformed the Nuclear Energy Board, whose powers had been reduced since 1980, renaming it as Centre for Energy, Environmental and Technological Research (CIEMAT) and establishing it as a scientific and technological research agency in the fields of energy and environment. At the same time, the Carlos III Health Institute (ISCIII) was founded.

=== Present ===
After two decades in the Education Department, in 2000 prime minister José María Aznar created the Ministry of Science and Technology that unified the responsibilities on scientific research of the Ministry of Education, and the powers over technological development of the Ministry of Industry and Energy, including telecommunications. The tertiary education policy remained in the Ministry of Education. Minister Anna Birulés, addressing the Congress of Deputies' Science and Technology Committee, defined the ministry as follows:

It is in this context that we must understand the timely creation of this Ministry of Science and Technology, which has the challenge but also the opportunity to make a reality, within the time horizon of this legislature, the determined process of promoting the culture of innovation in our country, following the commitment made by the Prime Minister in his investiture speech.

— BIRULÉS, A., Congress Journal, Wednesday, June 21, 2000.

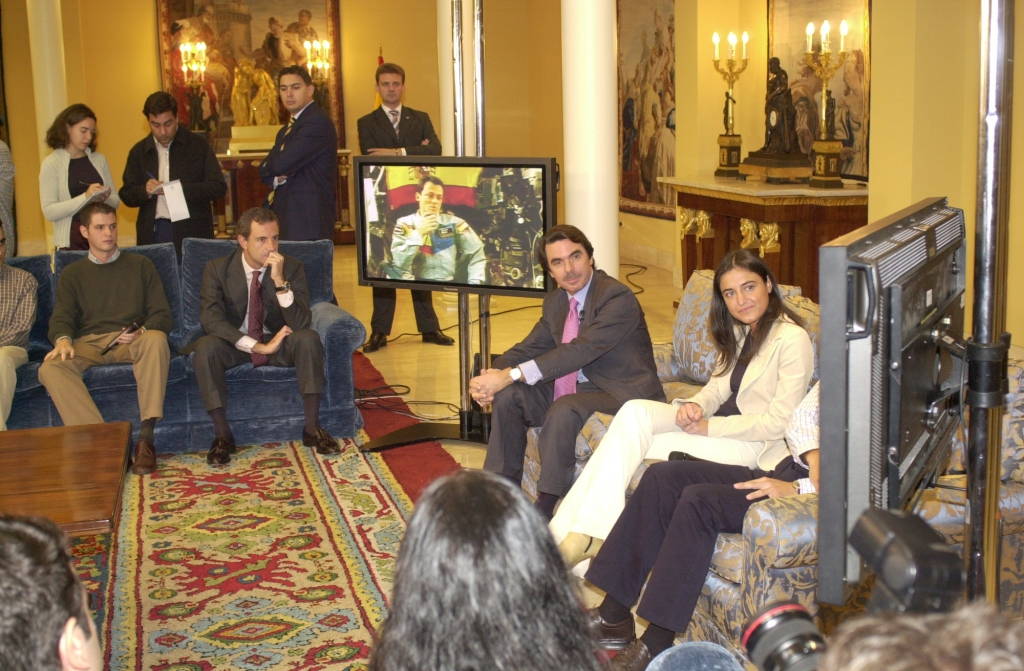
Videoconference between prime minister José María Aznar and science minister Juan Costa, with astronaut Pedro Duque. Year 2003

This stage did not bring many new developments in the scientific field, but it did in the technological field, since thanks to the impetus of the newly created Secretariat of State for Telecommunications and the Information Society the "Info XXI" Action Plan was designed in 2001, and the first Internet laws were approved: Law on Information Society Services and Electronic Trade (2002), General Telecommunications Law (2003) and Law on Electronic Signatures (2003). Also, the state-owned enterprise "Red.es" was launched.

The change of government in 2004 meant another dissolution for the ministerial department and another reintegration into the Ministry of Education. However, in his second term, prime minister José Luis Rodríguez Zapatero once again granted ministerial status to scientific responsibilities with the Ministry of Science and Innovation, with the aim, as explained by minister Cristina Garmendia, of "being less focused on construction and more focused on knowledge services, investing more in science and technology, helping companies to innovate, and coordinating universities and research centers". In 2009, university responsibilities were transferred back to the Department of Education.

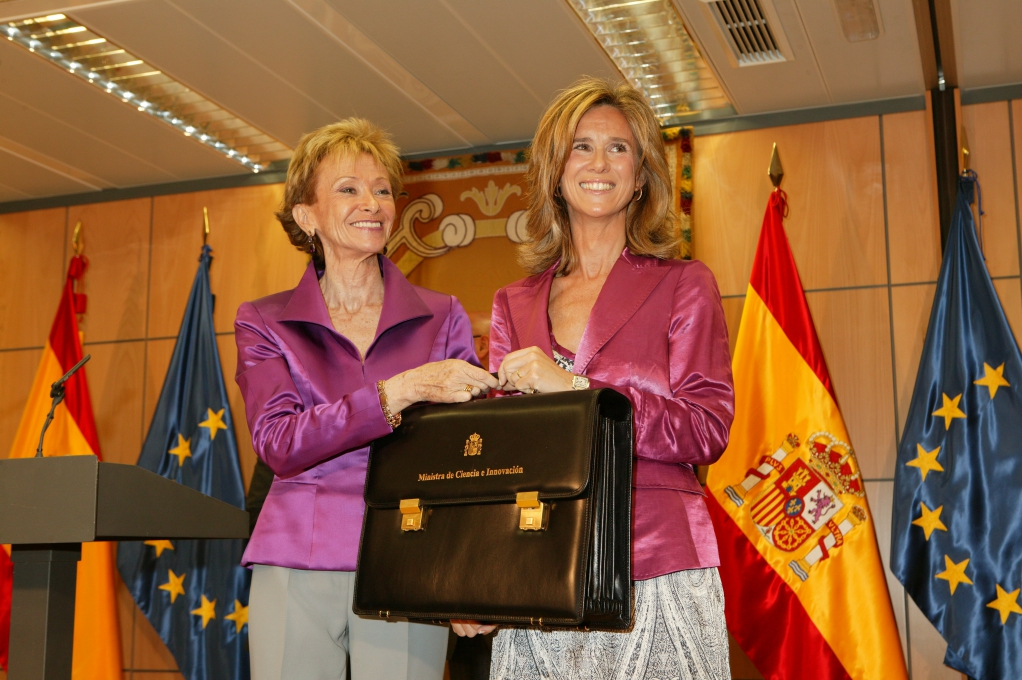
Deputy PM Fernández de la Vega hands over the science portfolio to Cristina Garmendia. Year 2008

However, the dependence on construction did not stop and with the outbreak of the property bubble and the 2008 financial crisis, the conservative government of Mariano Rajoy, in an effort to reduce public spending, reduced the size of the Administration merging the Ministry of Science and Innovation with the Ministry of Economy. During the premiership of Mariano Rajoy, the State Research Agency was also created, with numerous delays, and is currently the main scientific funding agency in Spain, along with the CDTI.

==== The push into space ====
Already with a better economic situation, in 2018 prime minister Pedro Sánchez heeded the demands of the scientific community and reinstated the department with scientific and university responsibilities, appointing astronaut Pedro Duque as minister. As a result of this minister's influence, for the first time it is expressly established that the department would have powers in space matters.

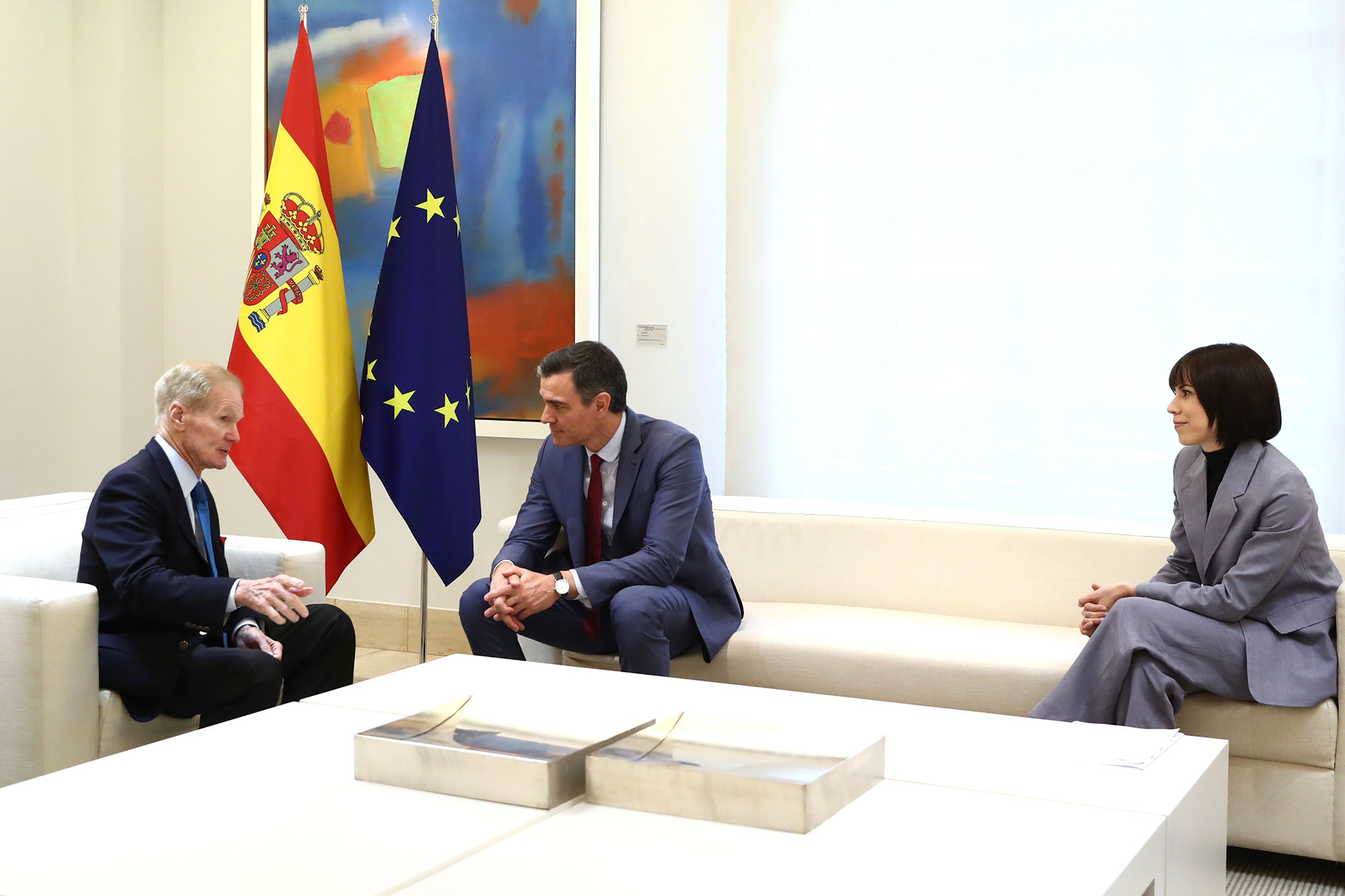
Prime Minister Pedro Sánchez and Minister of Science Diana Morant, in a meeting with the NASA administrator Bill Nelson

On the other hand, although Duque initially ruled it out, Moncloa Chief of Staff and Secretary of the National Security Council, Iván Redondo, announced in 2021 that the government would promote the creation of the Spanish Space Agency (AEE), since these responsibilities were dispersed among various government bodies, such as the National Institute for Aerospace Technology (INTA) and the CDTI. The new Science Law of 2022 provided for this, and finally, the Council of Ministers approved this new agency in March 2023, which directly assumed this area of responsibility. In this context, the Air Force was renamed as Air and Space Force and a Space Command was created, while Spain joined NASA's Artemis program.

In addition to the 2022 Science Law, this period was also marked by the loss of university powers in 2020, which were transferred to an independent department. This move was met with disapproval from the rectors of Spanish universities, who considered it a "setback" and from the minister of universities himself, Manuel Castells, who believed that science and universities had an "intrinsic and fundamental relationship". Three years later, in November 2023, and after years of pressure by the scientific and university communities, the Prime Minister abolished the Universities Department and its responsibilities returned to this department.

== Organization ==
Organizational chart of the Spanish Ministry of Science, May 2024

The science minister, a member of the Council of Ministers, is the most senior official of the Science Department. As such, the minister establishes the ministry's priorities and organization, and appoints the rest of departmental officials.

The minister is assisted by two main officials. On the one side is the Secretary of State for Science, Innovation and Universities, who helps the minister in the design and implementation of these policies, as well as in promoting Spanish science internationally. On the other side is the Ministry's Under-Secretary, who supports the minister in the daily management of the department.

As of 2026, this is the organization of the Ministry:

Ministry Organization (2026)
Minister	Cabinet (Chief of Staff)
Secretary of State for Science, Innovation and Universities	General Secretariat for Research
Secretary of State for Science, Innovation and Universities	Spanish National Research Council (CSIC)
Secretary of State for Science, Innovation and Universities	Carlos III Health Institute (ISCIII)
Secretary of State for Science, Innovation and Universities	Research Centre for Energy, Environment and Technology (CIEMAT)
Secretary of State for Science, Innovation and Universities	Canary Islands Institute of Astrophysics (IAC)
Secretary of State for Science, Innovation and Universities	General Secretariat for Universities
Secretary of State for Science, Innovation and Universities	Menéndez Pelayo International University (UIMP)
Secretary of State for Science, Innovation and Universities	National Agency for Quality Assessment and Accreditation (ANECA)
Secretary of State for Science, Innovation and Universities	Spanish Service for the Internationalization of Education (SEPIE)
Secretary of State for Science, Innovation and Universities	National University of Distance Education (UNED)
Secretary of State for Science, Innovation and Universities	College of Spain in Paris
Secretary of State for Science, Innovation and Universities	General Secretariat for Innovation
Secretary of State for Science, Innovation and Universities	Centre for the Development of Industrial Technology (CDTI)
Secretary of State for Science, Innovation and Universities	Spanish Space Agency (AEE)
Secretary of State for Science, Innovation and Universities	Special Commissioner for the Strategic Project for Economic Recovery and Transformation (PERTE) on Advanced Healthcare
Secretary of State for Science, Innovation and Universities	Directorate-General for Planning, Coordination and Knowledge Transfer
Secretary of State for Science, Innovation and Universities	Deputy Directorate-General for Institutional Relations and International Coordination
Secretary of State for Science, Innovation and Universities	State Research Agency (AEI)
Secretary of State for Science, Innovation and Universities	National Museum of Science and Technology (MUNCYT)
Under-Secretary	Technical General Secretariat
Under-Secretary	Deputy Directorate-General for Human Resources and Inspection of Services
Under-Secretary	Administrative Office
Under-Secretary	Deputy Directorate-General for Economic Management
Under-Secretary	Budget Office
Under-Secretary	Deputy Directorate-General for European Funds for Research, Innovation and Higher Education
Under-Secretary	IT Division
Under-Secretary	Institute of Spain

=== Advisory bodies ===
- The Scientific, Technological and Innovation Policy Council.
- The Science, Technology and Innovation Advisory Council
- The Spanish Research Ethics Committee
- The Observatory "Women, Science and Innovation"
- The University Policy General Conference
- The University Council.
- The State University Student Council.
- The Spanish Polar Committee.

== Headquarters ==
The Ministry of Science is one of the government departments located at the Cuzco Government Complex in Madrid. Specifically, this ministry is located at number 162 Paseo de la Castellana (Cuzco Tower), a building that also houses the Ministry of Economy.

Furthermore, the department's agencies have their own headquarters, most of which are located in Madrid. However, the Canary Islands Institute of Astrophysics, located in San Cristóbal de La Laguna (Santa Cruz de Tenerife), and the Spanish Space Agency, headquartered in Seville, stand out in this regard.

=== Historic headquarters ===
During the first period of this department's existence (1979–1981), it was located at number 150 Serrano Street in Madrid. When the decision was made to install the department there, the building was occupied by the Institute for Rationalization and Standardization (IRANOR), which had to vacate it almost without prior notice. The building must have had ventilation problems because, in the summer of 1980, the staff suffered the discomfort of working due to the high temperatures of the Madrid summer. After the department was disestablished, it continued to house scientific offices such as the Secretariat of State for Universities and Research.

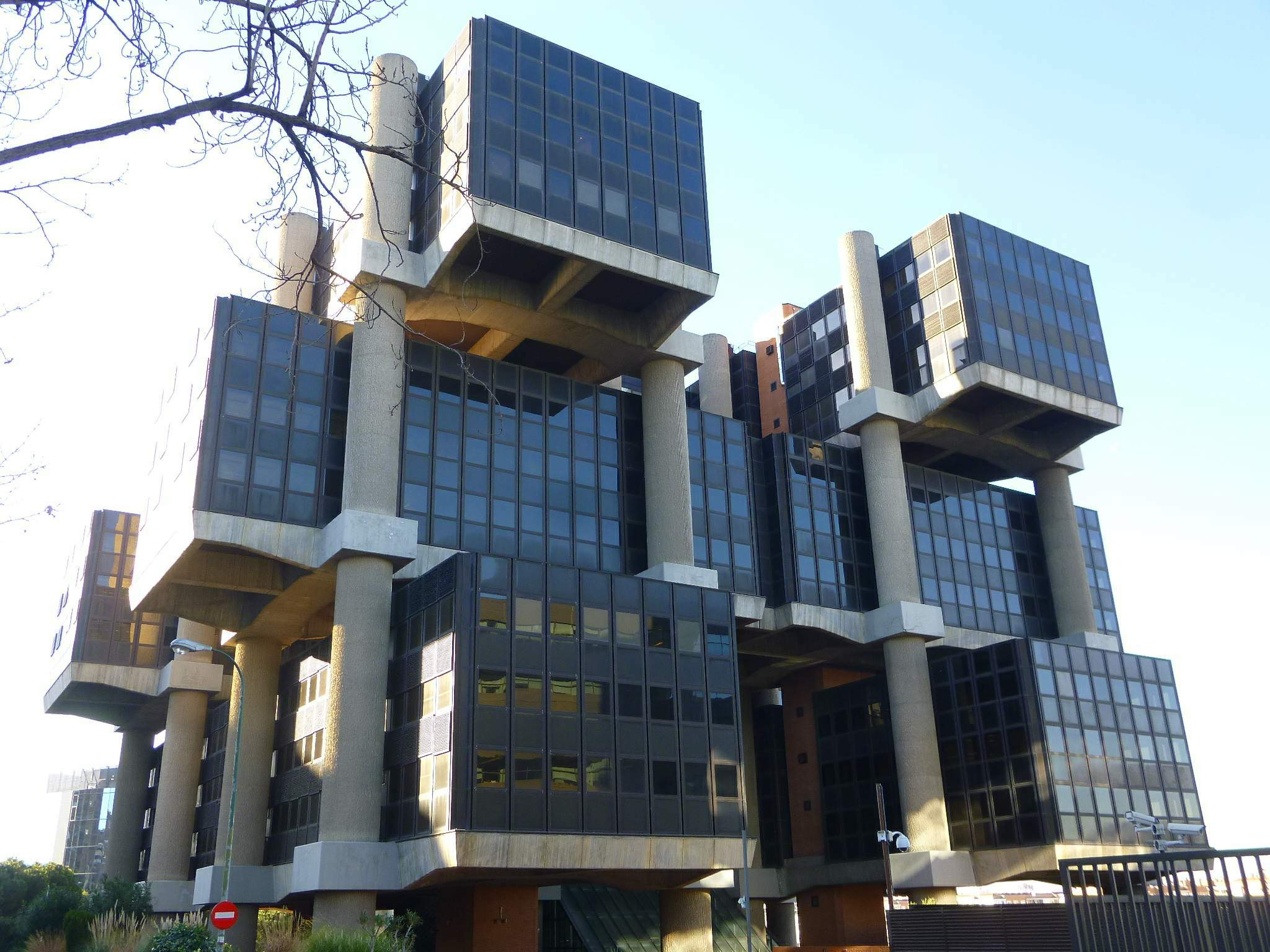
Office building known as "Los Cubos", property that housed, through rental, part of the scientific bodies of the Spanish government between 2005 and 2015.

In its second period (2000–2004), the Ministry's main headquarters were located at number 160 Paseo de la Castellana, the traditional headquarters of the Ministry of Industry at the Cuzco Government Complex, which was vacant during this period, since the Department of Industry was abolished and the Department of Science assumed industrial responsibilities. At the same time, the Palacio de Cibeles (also known as Palace of Communications) served as the secondary headquarters, since the services of the Secretariat of State for Telecommunications and the Information Society were located there.

Finally, in its third period (2008–2011) it was installed at number 5 Albacete Street in Madrid, a building known as "Los Cubos" ("The Cubes"), a building rented by the Ministry of Education and Science to house the Secretariat fof State for Universities and Research, which, after the further dissolution of the Department of Science in 2011, continued to house the services of the Secretariat of State for Research, Development and Innovation until 2015.

== Budget ==
In millions of euros (€)
1. Research policy 4,680.3 (57.1%)
2. European research funds 1,644.2 (20.1%)
3. Innovation policy 1,487.5 (18.1%)
4. University policy 327.3 (3.99%)
5. Administration and general services 57.6 (0.70%)

For fiscal year 2023, extended to 2026, the Ministry of Science has a consolidated budget of €8.2 billion. Of this amount, €4.6 billion are directly managed by the ministry's central services while €3.6 billion are managed by its agencies.

The budget can be divided in five main areas:

1. Research policy (Programs 143A, 463A, 463B, 465A, 467H), which funds the Spanish Science, Technology and Innovation System, including public research organisations, scientific projects, research careers and sectoral research in strategic areas.
2. Innovation policy (467C), aimed at promoting innovation in the industrial fabric through direct support to firms and industrial R&D.
3. European research funds (45DA, 45DC, 45ED, 46OE, 46QA, 46QB, 46QC, 46QD, 46QE, 46QF, 46QG & 46QI), which finances cross-cutting policies of interest for the Next Generation EU, mainly focused on scientific promotion, environment and digitalisation.
4. University policy (144B, 322C, 323M, 46UD & 46UE), which covers the ministry's functions over the Spanish University System, including scholarships and student grants.
5. Administration and general services (461M), covering the Ministry’s central services and administrative structure.

In addition, Programme 000X (“Internal Transfers and Disbursements”) is excluded from the analysis, as it consists of transfers between public sector entities and would otherwise lead to double counting and distort the overall budget.

=== Audit ===
The Ministry's accounts, as well as those of its agencies, are internally audited by the Office of the Comptroller General of the State (IGAE), through a Delegated Comptroller's Office within the Department itself. Externally, the Court of Auditors is responsible for auditing expenditures.

Likewise, the Congress of Deputies and the Senate Committees on Science, Innovation and Universities, exercise political control over the accounts.

== List of officeholders ==
Office name:

- Ministry of Universities and Research (1979–1981)
- Ministry of Science and Technology (2000–2004)
- Ministry of Science and Innovation (2008–2011; 2020–2023)
- Ministry of Science, Innovation and Universities (2018–2020; 2023–present)

Portrait	Name (Birth–Death)	Term of office			Party	Government	Prime Minister (Tenure)	Ref.
Portrait	Name (Birth–Death)	Took office	Left office	Duration	Party	Government	Prime Minister (Tenure)	Ref.
	Luis González Seara (1936–2016)	6 April 1979	27 February 1981	1 year and 327 days	UCD	Suárez III	Adolfo Suárez (1976–1981)	
	Juan Antonio Ortega y Díaz-Ambrona (born 1939)	27 February 1981	7 March 1981	8 days	UCD	Calvo-Sotelo	Leopoldo Calvo-Sotelo (1981–1982)	
Office disestablished during this interval. (Note: The department's competences were transferred to the Ministry of Education and Science between 1981 and 1996, and to the Ministry of Education and Culture between 1996 and 2000.)
	Anna Birulés (born 1954)	28 April 2000	10 July 2002	2 years and 73 days	Independent	Aznar II	José María Aznar (1996–2004)	
	Josep Piqué (1955–2023)	10 July 2002	4 September 2003	1 year and 56 days	PP	Aznar II	José María Aznar (1996–2004)	
	Juan Costa (born 1965)	4 September 2003	18 April 2004	227 days	PP	Aznar II	José María Aznar (1996–2004)	
Office disestablished during this interval. (Note: The department's competences were transferred to the Ministry of Education and Science between 2004 and 2008.)
	Cristina Garmendia (born 1962)	14 April 2008	22 December 2011	3 years and 252 days	Independent	Zapatero II	José Luis; Rodríguez Zapatero (2004–2011)	
Office disestablished during this interval. (Note: The department's competences were transferred to the Ministry of Economy and Competitiveness between 2011 and 2016, and to the Ministry of Economy, Industry and Competitiveness between 2016 and 2018.)
	Pedro Duque (born 1963)	7 June 2018	13 January 2020	3 years and 35 days	Independent	Sánchez I	Pedro Sánchez (2018–present)	
	Pedro Duque (born 1963)	13 January 2020	12 July 2021	3 years and 35 days	Independent	Sánchez II	Pedro Sánchez (2018–present)	
	Diana Morant (born 1980)	12 July 2021	21 November 2023	5 years and 79 days	PSOE	Sánchez II	Pedro Sánchez (2018–present)	
	Diana Morant (born 1980)	21 November 2023	Incumbent	5 years and 79 days	PSOE	Sánchez III	Pedro Sánchez (2018–present)	

== See also ==
- Instituto Nacional de Técnica Aeroespacial
- Spanish National Research Council
- Medal of Merit in Research and University Education
