= Lomana =

Lomana is a surname. Notable people with the surname include:

- Carmen Lomana (born 1948), Spanish businesswoman, television host, socialite, and haute couture collector
- Gloria Lomana (born 1959), Spanish journalist
