= 2012 PP national party congress =

- 17−19 February 2012

3,172 delegates in the National Congress Plurality needed to win
- Opinion polls
- Turnout: 2,597 (81.9%) (executive); 2,595 (81.8%) (board)
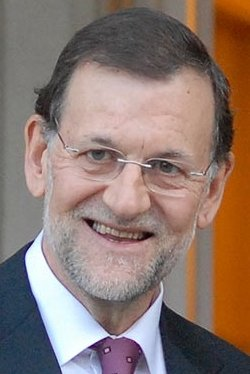

| Candidate | Mariano Rajoy | Blank ballots |
| Delegate vote | 2,525 (97.6%) | 63 (2.4%) |
| Board | 2,522 (97.4%) | 66 (2.6%) |
President before election
Mariano Rajoy
Elected President
Mariano Rajoy

The People's Party (PP) held its 17th national congress in Seville from 17 to 19 February 2012, to renovate its governing bodies—including the post of president, which amounted to that of party leader—and establish the party platform and policy until the next congress. The congress slogan was "Committed to Spain" (Spanish: Comprometidos con España), and it saw Mariano Rajoy, incumbent prime minister of Spain as a result of the PP victory at the 2011 Spanish general election, being re-elected unopposed for a third term as party president with 97.6% of the delegate vote in the congress (2,525 votes) and 2.4% of blank ballots (63).

== Overview ==
The congress of the PP was the party's supreme body, and could be of either ordinary or extraordinary nature, depending on whether it was held following the natural end of its term or due to any other exceptional circumstances not linked to this event. Ordinary congresses were to be held every three years and called at least two months in advance of their celebration. Extraordinary congresses had to be called by a two-thirds majority of the Board of Directors at least one-and-a-half month in advance of their celebration, though in cases of "exceptional urgency" this deadline could be reduced to 30 days.

The president of the PP was the party's head and the person holding the party's political and legal representation, and presided over its board of directors and executive committee, which were the party's maximum directive, governing and administration bodies between congresses. The election of the PP president was based on an indirect system, with party members voting for delegates who would, in turn, elect the president. Any party member was eligible for the post of party president, on the condition that they were up to date with the payment of party fees and that they were able to secure the signed endorsements of at least 100 party members and of 20% of congress delegates.

== Timetable ==
The key dates are listed below (all times are CET. Note that the Canary Islands use WET (UTC+0) instead):

- 12 December: Official announcement of the congress.
- 19–20 January: Election of congress delegates.
- 17–19 February: Party congress.

== Candidates ==
| Candidate | Notable positions | Announced | Ref. |
=== Proclaimed ===
Candidates who met endorsement requirements and were officially proclaimed to contest the party congress.
| Mariano Rajoy (age 56) | Prime Minister of Spain (since 2011); President of the PP (since 2004); Member of the Congress of Deputies for Madrid (since 2004); Leader of the Opposition of Spain (2004–2011); Secretary-General of the PP (2003–2004); Member of the Congress of Deputies for Pontevedra (1986 and 1989–2004); Spokesperson of the Government of Spain (2002–2003); Minister of the Presidency of Spain (2000–2001 and 2002–2003); First Deputy Prime Minister of Spain (2000–2003); Deputy Secretary-General of the PP (1990–2003); Minister of the Interior of Spain (2001–2002); Minister of Education and Culture of Spain (1999–2000); Minister of Public Administrations of Spain (1996–1999); President of AP/PP in the province of Pontevedra (1983–1986 and 1987–1991); Vice President of the Xunta de Galicia (1986–1987); President of the Provincial Deputation of Pontevedra (1983–1986); City Councillor of Pontevedra (1983–1986); Member of the Parliament of Galicia for Pontevedra (1981–1985); Director-General for Institutional Relations of Galicia (1982) | 12 December 2011 | |

=== Declined ===
The individuals in this section were the subject of speculation about their possible candidacy, but publicly denied or recanted interest in running:

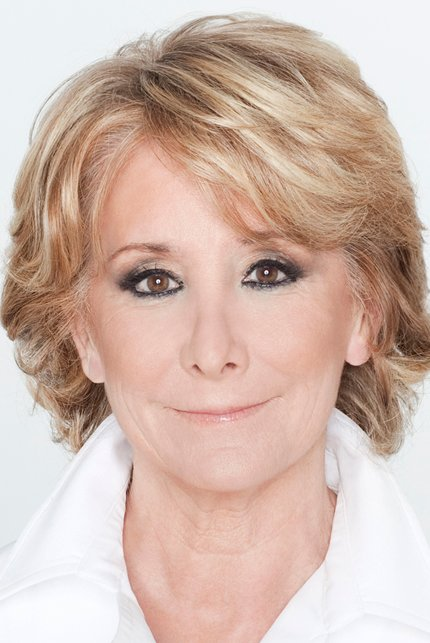
Esperanza Aguirre

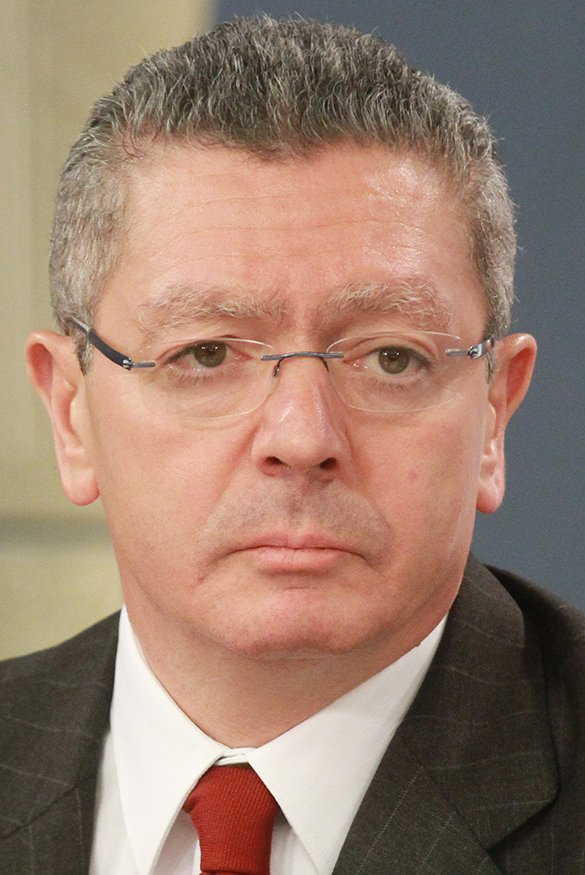
Alberto Ruiz-Gallardón

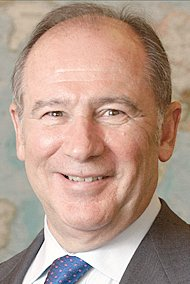
Rodrigo Rato
- Esperanza Aguirre (age 60) — President of the PP of the Community of Madrid (since 2004); President of the Community of Madrid (since 2003); Member of the Assembly of Madrid (since 2003); Spokesperson of the People's Group in the Assembly of Madrid (2003); Senator for Madrid (1996–2003); President of the Senate of Spain (1999–2002); Minister of Education and Culture of Spain (1996–1999); First Deputy Mayor of Madrid (1995–1996); Spokesperson of the People's Group in Madrid (1995–1996); City Councillor of Madrid (1983–1996).
- Alberto Ruiz-Gallardón (age 53) — Minister of Justice of Spain (2011–2014); Member of the Congress of Deputies for Madrid (2011–2014); Mayor of Madrid (2003–2011); City Councillor of Madrid (1983–1987 and 2003–2011); President of the Community of Madrid (1995–2003); Member of the Assembly of Madrid (1987–2003); Spokesperson of the People's Parliamentary Group in the Senate (1993–1995); Senator appointed by the Assembly of Madrid (1987–1995); Spokesperson of the People's Group in the Assembly of Madrid (1987–1993); Vice President of AP (1987–1989); Secretary-General of AP (1986–1987).
- Rodrigo Rato (age 62) — Managing Director of the International Monetary Fund (2004–2007); First Deputy Prime Minister of Spain (2003–2004); Deputy Secretary-General of the PP (1996–2004); Member of the Congress of Deputies for Madrid (1989–2004); Second Deputy Prime Minister for Economic Affairs of Spain (2000–2003); Minister of Economy of Spain (2000–2003); Second Deputy Prime Minister of Spain (1996–2000); Minister of Economy and Finance of Spain (1996–2000); Spokesperson of the People's Parliamentary Group in the Congress (1989–1996); Member of the Congress of Deputies for Cádiz (1982–1989).

== Opinion polls ==
Poll results are listed in the tables below in reverse chronological order, showing the most recent first, and using the date the survey's fieldwork was done, as opposed to the date of publication. If such date is unknown, the date of publication is given instead. The highest percentage figure in each polling survey is displayed in bold, and the background shaded in the candidate's colour. In the instance of a tie, the figures with the highest percentages are shaded.

=== PP voters ===
| Polling firm/Commissioner | Fieldwork date | Sample size | | | | | | | | Other /None | Question | Lead |
| Polling firm/Commissioner | Fieldwork date | Sample size | Rajoy (Inc.) | Aguirre | Gallardón | Rato | Aznar | Camps | Costa | Other /None | Question | Lead |
|---|---|---|---|---|---|---|---|---|---|---|---|---|
| Opina/Cadena SER (Note: "Pulsómetro 02/11/10" (PDF). Instituto Opina (in Spanish). 2 November 2010. Archived from the original on 22 November 2010.) | 28–29 Oct 2010 | 1,000 | **31.7** | 17.0 | 13.6 | 18.7 | 13.5 | – | – | – | 5.5 | 13.0 |
| Metroscopia/El País | 2 Jun 2010 | 506 | **56.0** | 10.0 | 7.0 | 4.0 | – | – | – | 6.0 | 17.0 | 46.0 |
| Sigma Dos/El Mundo | 4–5 Nov 2009 | 1,000 | 18.9 | 10.5 | 20.3 | **27.0** | – | – | – | 23.3 | | 6.7 |
| Sigma Dos/El Mundo | 22–26 Dec 2008 | 1,000 | 15.0 | 17.0 | 27.4 | **29.4** | – | – | – | 11.2 | | 2.0 |
| Opina/Cadena SER | 26 Jun 2008 | 1,000 | 20.1 | 10.6 | **26.6** | 23.5 | 6.5 | 2.4 | 1.0 | 2.4 | 6.8 | 3.1 |

=== Spanish voters ===
| Polling firm/Commissioner | Fieldwork date | Sample size | | | | | | | | Other /None | Question | Lead |
| Polling firm/Commissioner | Fieldwork date | Sample size | Rajoy (Inc.) | Aguirre | Gallardón | Rato | Aznar | Camps | Costa | Other /None | Question | Lead |
|---|---|---|---|---|---|---|---|---|---|---|---|---|
| Opina/Cadena SER | 28–29 Oct 2010 | 1,000 | 19.4 | 14.5 | **25.2** | 21.9 | 10.6 | – | – | – | 8.4 | 3.3 |
| Opina/Cadena SER (Note: "Pulsómetro 13/10/10". Cadena SER (in Spanish). 13 October 2010. Archived from the original on 16 October 2010.) | 7–8 Oct 2010 | 1,000 | 17.7 | 14.9 | **26.6** | 21.0 | 10.6 | – | – | – | 9.3 | 5.6 |
| Metroscopia/El País | 2 Jun 2010 | 506 | **31.0** | 5.0 | 14.0 | 2.0 | – | – | – | 7.0 | 41.0 | 17.0 |
| Sigma Dos/El Mundo | 23–29 Dec 2009 | 1,000 | 18.9 | – | **24.4** | – | – | – | – | – | – | 5.5 |
| Sigma Dos/El Mundo | 4–5 Nov 2009 | 1,000 | 13.6 | – | **32.9** | 17.4 | – | – | – | – | – | 15.5 |
| Opina/Cadena SER | 26 Jun 2008 | 1,000 | 17.1 | 8.5 | **40.8** | 12.8 | 3.8 | 1.4 | 0.6 | 3.4 | 11.6 | 23.7 |

== Results ==
Summary of the 18 February 2012 PP congress results
| Candidate | Executive | | Board | |
| Candidate | Votes | % | Votes | % |
|---|---|---|---|---|
| Mariano Rajoy | 2,525 | 97.57 | 2,522 | 97.45 |
| Blank ballots | 63 | 2.43 | 66 | 2.55 |
| Total | 2,588 | | 2,588 | |
| Valid votes | 2,588 | 99.65 | 2,588 | 99.73 |
| Invalid votes | 9 | 0.35 | 7 | 0.27 |
| Votes cast / turnout | 2,597 | 81.87 | 2,595 | 81.81 |
| Abstentions | 575 | 18.13 | 577 | 18.19 |
| Registered voters | 3,172 | | 3,172 | |

Vote by delegates (Executive)
| Rajoy | 97.57% |
| Blank ballots | 2.43% |

Vote by delegates (Board)
| Rajoy | 97.45% |
| Blank ballots | 2.55% |
