= CIEMAT =

Spanish public research institution

Centre for Energy, Environmental and Technological Research
- Centro de Investigaciones Energéticas, Medioambientales y Tecnológicas

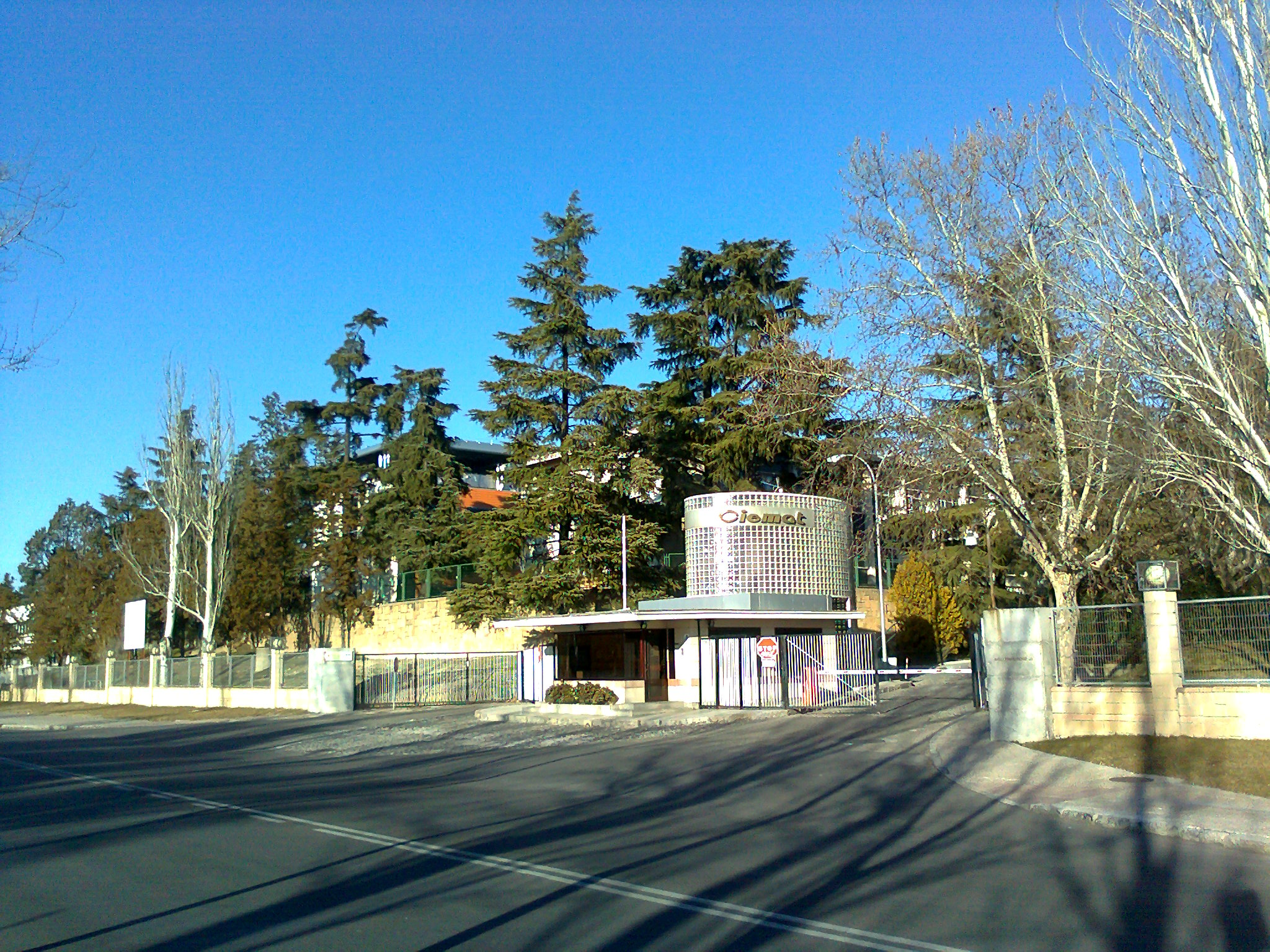

Agency overview
- Formed: October 8, 1948; 77 years ago
- Preceding agency: Junta de Energía Nuclear
- Jurisdiction: Spain
- Headquarters: Avenida Complutense, 40, 28040 Madrid
- Employees: 1295 (as July 2021)
- Annual budget: 136.7 million € (2022)
- Agency executive: Yolanda Benito Moreno, Director
- Website: https://www.ciemat.es/

The Centre for Energy, Environmental and Technological Research (CIEMAT), until 1986 Junta de Energía Nuclear (JEN), is a Spanish public research institution.

== History ==
The Centre for Energy, Environmental and Technological Research (CIEMAT) is a Spanish public research institution which specializes in energy and the environment. It is attached to the General Secretariat for Research of the Ministry of Science and Innovation. In September 1948, Francisco Franco, by means of a decree of reserved character, created the Board of Atomic Investigations o Junta de Investigaciones Atómicas (JIA), constituted 8 October 1948 and formed by Jose Maria Otero de Navascués (director-general and president until 1974), Manuel Lora-Tamayo, Armando Durán Miranda and José Ramón Sobredo i Rioboo.

In 1951, after finishing the secret phase, it was rebaptized as Board of Nuclear Power or Junta de Energía Nuclear (JEN), under the presidency of General Juan Vigón and with Otero de Navascués as chief of the main directorate (later he would be its president again), and has since carried out research and technological development projects, serving as a reference to technically represent Spain in international forums and to advise public administrations on matters within its areas of research. In 1956, Guillermo Velarde entered the Division of Theoretical Physics of this Meeting, later being named Director of Technology that included the Divisions of Electronics, Theory and Calculation of Reactors, Nuclear Fusion, Engineering and Reactors in Operation.
