= Spanish Trainees =

European Space Agency programme

A Spanish Trainee was the beneficiary from a Spanish fellowship program that gave young professionals from Spain the opportunity to do a traineeship in one of the European Space Agency's (ESA) establishments, in fields related to space science and engineering. It is an initiative to bring state-of-the-art knowledge to the Spanish aerospace industry.

The program objective was to train Spanish graduates at the ESA in order to create professionals in the space industry, therefore reinforcing the technological know-how in this field.

The fellowship was an initiative of the Spanish Ministry of Science and Innovation, together with the CDTI (Centre for the Development of Industrial Technology). It was part of the Subprogram of specialisation in international organizations, among them ESA, CERN, ESRO, ESRF and GSI.

The fellowship programme, which is no longer running, was called in Spanish "Becas de Especialización en Organismos Internacionales". Aside from the ESA, it also offered the beneficiary traineeships in a number of other research institutions across Europe such as CERN, Rutherford Appleton Laboratory or the European Southern Observatory.

The programme lasted up to 2 years, during which time the trainee is integrated in an ESA section under the supervision of an ESA staff member. At the end of the programme, the beneficiary is specialised in a space-related topic and therefore has a wide range of opportunities to develop his or her career in the sector, either in the industry or as part of the ESA.
