= Agencia Espacial Española =

Spanish agency for Space affairs

Spanish Space Agency
- Agencia Espacial Española
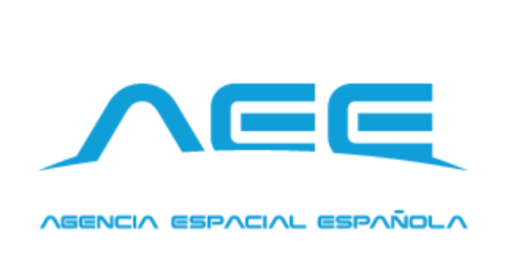

Space agency overview
- Formed: April 20, 2023; 3 years ago
- Jurisdiction: Government of Spain
- Headquarters: CREA Building José Galán Merino Street 6, 41015 Seville, Spain
- Employees: 68 (2025)
- Annual budget: €700 million
- Space agency executives: Diana Morant, President; Juan Carlos Cortés Pulido, Director
- Parent department: Ministry of Science; Ministry of Defence
- Website: www.aee.gob.es

The Agencia Espacial Española (AEE; Spanish Space Agency) is an agency of the Spanish government responsible for the Spanish space program. The agency was officially announced on 27 May 2021 and it became operational on 20 April 2023.

This new agency aims to group in a single body all the space powers of the General State Administration, mainly those of the National Institute for Aerospace Technology (INTA, created in 1942) and the Centre for the Development of Industrial Technology (CDTI, created in 1977).

== History ==
=== INTA and other agencies ===
The concern of the Spanish government in relation to space issues appears in the 1940s, when the National Institute for Aerospace Technology (INTA) was created. However, this body focused its efforts on satellite and rocket programs, but has never been configured as a true space agency that would coordinate public and private efforts around a defined space program.

For this reason, in 1963 the National Space Research Commission (CONIE) was created, initially attached to the Ministry of the Air and later to the Ministry of Defence.

This organization had three objectives:

- To advise and propose to the Government the national programs of tests, achievements and research of the very high atmosphere and outer space, together with the necessary budgets for the development of such programs.
- To distribute the programs among the various national Research Services or Institutes that specifically must participate in them, as well as promote, stimulate, direct and coordinate the activities of such Services and Institutes in what refers to the investigation of the very high atmosphere and from outer space.
- To promote collaboration with international space organizations.

In 1986, the Promotion and General Coordination of Scientific and Technical Research Act dismissed the commission and it transferred its powers to two bodies: first, to the Interministerial Committee for Science and Technology (CICYT, a collective government body to coordinate this affairs) and, secondly, to the Centre for the Development of Industrial Technology (CDTI), which acts as a space project funding agency and coordinate the European Space Agency's programs in Spain.

=== Recent times ===
In 2014, the Interministerial Committee for Space Industrial and Technological Policy was created to coordinate the interest of the several ministries that at that time had space responsibilities. This committee was made up of representatives from the Ministry of Defense, the Ministry of Finance and Public Administrations, the Ministry of Development, the Ministry of Industry, Energy and Tourism, the Ministry of Economy and Competitiveness, the National Institute of Aerospace Technology, the Centre for the Development of Industrial Technology and the State Meteorological Agency (AEMET). In 2015, the government announced the creation of the agency to unify all space research activities, but this was not carried out.

With the arrival at the Ministry of Science of former astronaut Pedro Duque, the industry recovered the idea of creating a space agency, but the government discarded the idea again since they considered that creating more structures was not going to solve the problem and that the most logical was to continue betting on the European Space Agency (ESA). Despite this, on 27 May 2021, the new Science Minister, Diana Morant, announced that the draft Science Act included the possibility of creating said body, and that, indeed, they would do so. The new Science, Technology and Innovation Act was passed on 26 August 2022 and entered into force on 7 September 2022.

Between 2021 and 2022 the government has been implementing measures in this regard, establishing a new National Security Strategy that considered vital to have a space agency, presenting the Science bill to Parliament and the creation in June 2022 of the Space Council, an interministerial working group in charge of drawing up the internal regulations and the initial action plan of the future Spanish Space Agency. The Space Council is chaired by a Special Commissioner, a position established in 2022 to coordinate all the public and private efforts to promote the space industry. The government also announced in June 2022 that the Spanish Air Force, the Army of the Air, would be renamed as Army of the Air and Space.

As initially expected, the agency became operational in 2023. On 7 March 2023, the Council of Ministers approved the internal regulations of the Agency and on 20 April 2023 the Agency's Governing Council held its constitutive session.

== Organization ==
The Spanish Space Agency is organized into three main bodies and several subordinated directorates:

- The President. The presidency is exercised by the minister of Science and Innovation. The president represents the Agency, convenes and directs the meetings of the Governing Council, and proposes to it, after consulting with the minister of Defense, the appointment director of the Agency.
- The Governing Council. It is the collective governing body of the Agency, made up of the president, the vice-presidents (there are four of them, one for each representative of the Ministries of Defence, Transport, Industry and Economy), the director of the Agency, and other representatives of the General State Administration. There are members, with voice but no vote, representatives of the scientific field, the space industry sector and workers.
  - As a permanent working body, it has a Permanent Commission, headed by the director of the Agency.
- The Director of the Agency, with the rank of undersecretary. It is the executive office of the Agency, on which the rest of the administrative bodies depend.
  - The General Secretariat. It is responsible for the management and administrative direction of human, economic, financial, technological, logistical and material resources. Likewise, it acts as the Secretary of the Governing Council.
  - The Directorate for Security and Planning. Its office holder is the first in the line of succession to the director of the Agency and this department is in charge of supporting the achievement of the goals of the different national strategies of which the Agency is a part, coordinating and supervising everything related to support to Aerospace Security, assists in the certification of space infrastructures, and it is responsible for everything related to the safe operation of Space Traffic and the monitoring of activities related to "Space Surveillance and Tracking" (SST) and "Space Situational Awareness" (SSA). Likewise, it is in charge of ensuring the environmental sustainability of space operations and cybersecurity, the protection of information, the accreditation of companies, premises and people who participate in classified projects, as well as protection against threats and risks, in Coordination with other bodies with competencies in this matter.
  - The Directorate for Programs and Industry, which is responsible for promoting, managing and coordinating the National Space Program, the technical and economic monitoring of existing programs, supervising the correct use of funds for the development of these programs and the national participation in all space programs. Also, it promote the space industry, analyzing the possible public investment in private initiatives of start-up companies.
  - The Directorate for Science, Technology and Innovation, which is responsible for identifying, promoting and developing space technologies in all areas, whether by carrying out its own programmes, financing others or helping to create and consolidate space technology-based companies.
  - The Directorate for Users, Services and Applications. This department is responsible for the promotion and development of space applications for public and private users and for the development of the downstream sector of the space industry.
  - The Space and Society Office, responsible for the promotion, through the appropriate communication and dissemination actions, of social interest in space and in projects, science, research, actions and others that derive from the Agency's powers.

Likewise, to ensure the proper functioning of the Agency, there is a Control Commission that collects information and transmits it to the Governing Council.

Finally, there are several advisory and support bodies to assist the different departments of the Agency.

== Directors ==
From March 2023 to December 2023, Miguel Belló Mora, the government commissioner for aerospace projects of the Ministry of Science served as acting director. After leaving both offices, the director for Security and Planning of the agency, brigadier general Juan Carlos Sánchez Delgado, assumed as acting director. Finally, in May 2024 the aerospace engineer Juan Carlos Cortés Pulido, then director for Programs and Industry of the agency, was appointed as the first director.

=== List ===
Denotes an Acting Director

N.º	Picture	Name	Start	End	Prime Minister	Monarch
-		Miguel Belló Mora (1961–)	8 March 2023	28 December 2023	Pedro Sánchez (2018-present)	Felipe VI (2014-present)
-		Brigadier general Juan Carlos Sánchez Delgado	28 December 2023	15 May 2024	Pedro Sánchez (2018-present)	Felipe VI (2014-present)
1.ª		Juan Carlos Cortés Pulido	15 May 2024	Incumbent	Pedro Sánchez (2018-present)	Felipe VI (2014-present)

== Headquarters ==
The Spanish prime minister disclosed the newly created state agency to be headquartered outside of the capital, Madrid, pursuant to the wider administrative decentralization plan devised by the government. The Government of Spain however announced that it would positively assess places located less than an hour away from an international airport, with connections to Brussels and Paris, and preferably to Amsterdam, Rome, Frankfurt, Prague, and Toulouse too, cited as the most frequent destinations for work trips among agency staff members.

The following municipalities submitted bids to host the headquarters: Huelva, Seville, Teruel, Elche, Las Palmas de Gran Canaria, Cabanillas del Campo, Yebes, Puertollano, Ciudad Real, León, Palencia, Cebreros, San Javier, Tres Cantos, Robledo de Chavela, and L'Hospitalet de Llobregat.

On 5 December 2022, the Government of Spain, via its spokesperson Isabel Rodríguez, disclosed the city of Seville as the location for the headquarters of the agency, tentatively intended to be operational in early 2023.
