= Anna Birulés =

Spanish politician and businesswoman

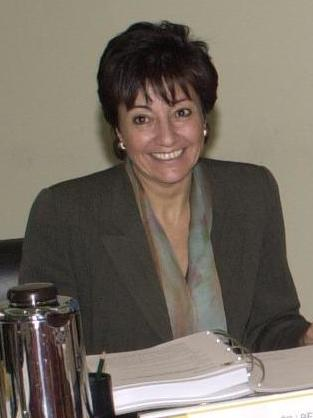

Minister of Science and Technology
- In office 28 April 2000 – 10 July 2002
- Prime Minister: José María Aznar
- Preceded by: Josep Piqué
- Succeeded by: Josep Piqué

Personal details
- Born: Anna María Birulés i Bertrán; 28 June 1954 (age 72) Girona, Spain
- Party: Independent
- Education: University of Barcelona; University of California, Berkeley

Anna María Birulés i Bertrán (born 28 June 1954) is a Spanish politician and businesswoman. She served as Minister of Science and Technology of Spain from April 2000 to July 2002.
