= Carlos III Health Institute =

Spanish public health research institute

The Carlos III Health Institute (Spanish: Instituto de Salud Carlos III; ISCIII) is a Spanish public health research institute, legally constituted as a public research agency (organismo público de investigación), a type of quasi-autonomous entity under Spanish law. The ISCIII is integrated in the Department of Science and Innovation, although it also reports to the Department of Health in the institute's activities relating health, healthcare and its planning.

The institute is named after King Charles III. It was founded in 1986 to promote research in biomedicine and health sciences and to develop and provide scientific and technical guidance for the Spanish National Health System and the benefit of society in general. It has two campuses in the Community of Madrid.
