= Félix Ynduráin Muñoz =

Spanish physicist (born 1946)

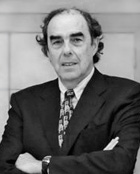
Félix Ynduráin Muñoz

Félix Ynduráin Muñoz (born January 18, 1946) is a Spanish condensed matter physicist and Professor at the Autonomous University of Madrid. He has more than 120 research papers published. Some of the centers where he has worked are the University of Cambridge, the University of California, Berkeley, the Thomas J. Watson Research Center, the Massachusetts Institute of Technology, the University of Paris-Sud and the Max Planck Institute for Solid State Research.

His research is currently focused on properties of point and extended defects in graphene and its derivatives, electronic structure and electron-phonon interaction in iron-based superconductors of high critical temperature, and on clathrate hydrates as storage of methane, carbon dioxide, hydrogen, etc.
