= Luis González Seara =

Spanish sociologist & politician (1936–2016)

Minister of Universities and Research
- In office 6 April 1979 – 1 September 1981

Member of the Congress of Deputies
- In office 1979–1982

Member of the Spanish Senate from Pontevedra
- In office 1977–1979

Personal details
- Born: Luis González Seara; 7 June 1936 A Merca, Ourense
- Died: 23 April 2016 (aged 79) Madrid
- Party: Democratic Action Party (1982–83)
- Other political affiliations: Union of the Democratic Centre (until 1982)
- Education: Complutense University of Madrid
- Occupation: politician
- Profession: sociologist

Luis González Seara (7 June 1936 – 23 April 2016) was a Spanish sociologist and politician.

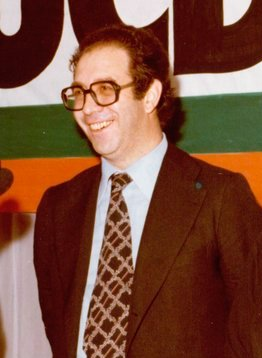
Adolfo Suárez participates in a meeting with the local and provincial committees of the UCD of Pontevedra in the electoral campaign.February 11, 1979
