= Josep Piqué =

Spanish politician (1955–2023)

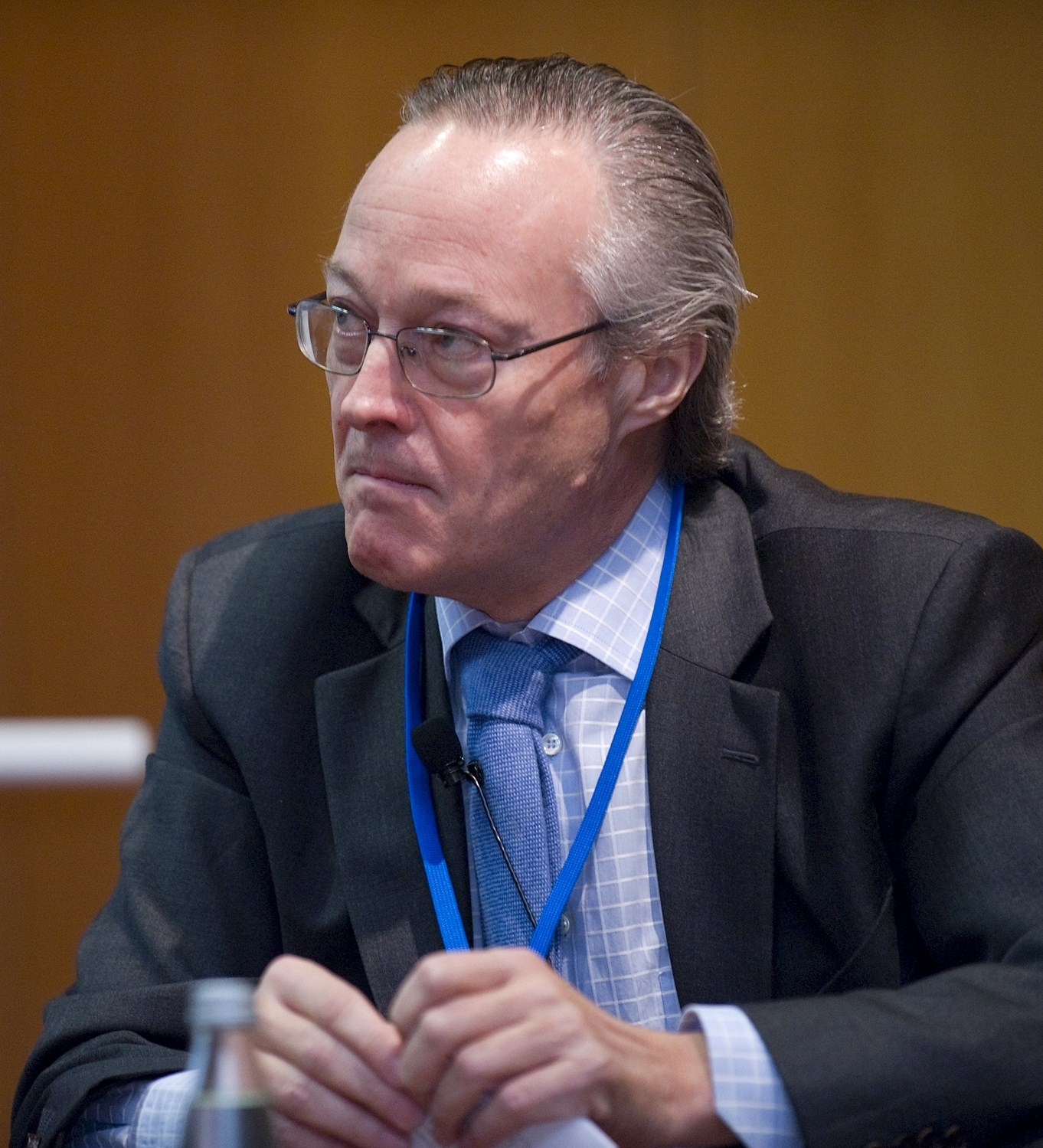
- Piqué in 2008

Minister of Science and Technology
- In office 10 July 2002 – 3 September 2003
- Monarch: Juan Carlos I
- Prime Minister: José María Aznar
- Preceded by: Anna Birulés
- Succeeded by: Juan Costa

Minister of Foreign Affairs
- In office 27 April 2000 – 10 July 2002
- Monarch: Juan Carlos I
- Prime Minister: José María Aznar
- Preceded by: Abel Matutes
- Succeeded by: Ana Palacio

Spokesperson of the Government
- In office 16 July 1998 – 27 April 2000
- Monarch: Juan Carlos I
- Prime Minister: José María Aznar
- Preceded by: Miguel Ángel Rodríguez Bajón
- Succeeded by: Pío Cabanillas Alonso

Minister of Industry and Energy
- In office 6 May 1996 – 27 April 2000
- Monarch: Juan Carlos I
- Prime Minister: José María Aznar
- Preceded by: Juan Manuel Eguiagaray
- Succeeded by: Rodrigo Rato (Economy); Anna Birulés (Science and Technology)

President of People's Party of Catalonia
- In office 19 October 2002 – 19 July 2007
- Preceded by: Alberto Fernández Díaz
- Succeeded by: Daniel Sirera

Personal details
- Born: Josep Piqué Camps; 21 February 1955 Vilanova i la Geltrú, Spain
- Died: 6 April 2023 (aged 68) Madrid, Spain
- Party: PPC
- Other political affiliations: Red Flag; PSUC; Independent
- Spouse: Gloria Lomana (m. 2009)
- Education: University of Barcelona

Josep Piqué Camps (21 February 1955 – 6 April 2023) was a Spanish politician of the conservative People's Party (PP). He served in ministerial departments under the José María Aznar government. He also helmed the People's Party of Catalonia from 2003 to 2007.

== Early life and education ==
Josep Piqué Camps was born on 21 February 1955 in Vilanova i la Geltrú, province of Barcelona, the son of local politician José Piqué Tetas. He earned a doctorate in Business and Economics and a Law degree from the University of Barcelona.

== Political career ==
=== Early years ===
In his youth, and during the last years of the Franco's dictatorship Piqué was a member of extreme left organization Red Flag, and the Unified Socialist Party of Catalonia.

Piqué was professor at the University of Barcelona between 1978 and 1986, being the tenured professor of Economic Theory from 1984 to 1986. That year, Piqué was named by Catalan president Jordi Pujol, Director General of Industry, an office he held until 1988 when returned to the private sector.

=== Minister of Industry and Energy: 1996–2000 ===
In view of the 1996 general elections, the leader of the People's Party (PP) and of the opposition José María Aznar wanted to improve his image in Catalonia and get closer to the business community and the Catalan bourgeoisie as it was a decisive territory in electoral terms. So in 1995, through the president of the Catalan employers' association Foment del Treball Joan Rossell, he contacted Josep Piqué.

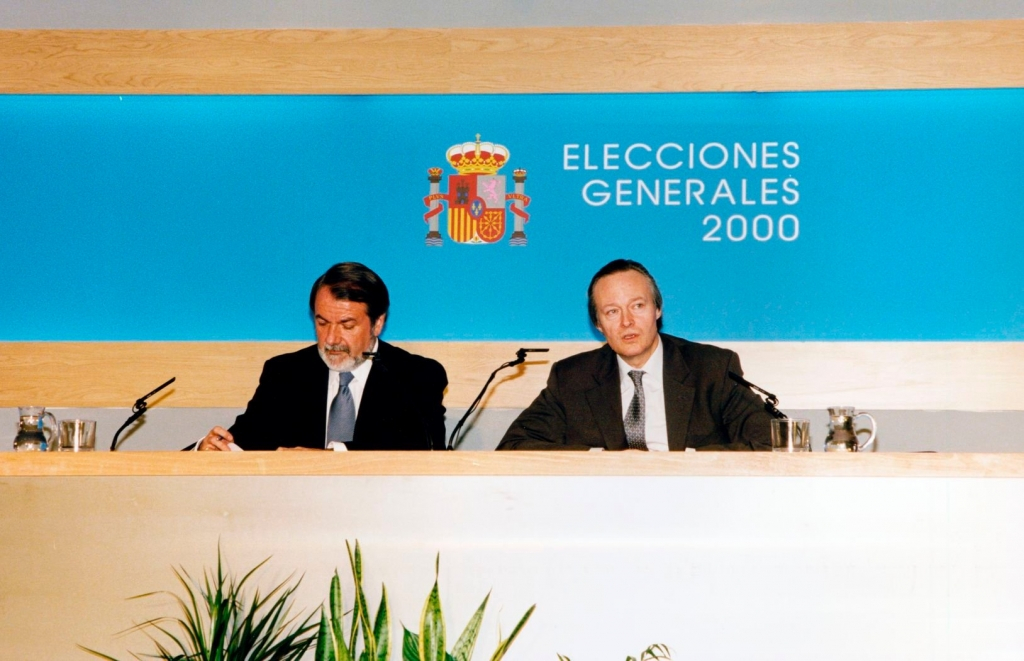
Piqué and Minister of the Interior Jaime Mayor Oreja(left) in 2000

After the electoral victory of the PP, José María Aznar, already as Prime Minister, appointed him Minister of Industry and Energy as an independent politician on 5 May 1996, and was sworn the following day. His main objective as minister, Piqué remarked that day, would be the reorganization of public enterprise, without ruling out privatization, in order to reduce the public deficit. He also referred to the reorganization of the electricity sector.

Piqué was responsible for the privatizations of large public companies such as Repsol, Telefónica, Endesa and Aceralia.

On 15 July 1998 he was appointed Spokesperson of the Government after rising as one of Aznar's most trusted men.

In January 1999, he joined the People's Party, taking a place in its National Executive Committee. .

=== Minister of Foreign Affairs: 2000–2002 ===
In the 2000 general elections, Piqué became member of the Congress of Deputies for the province of Barcelona.

Aznar appointed him, on 27 April, as the new Minister of Foreign Affairs, stepping down from the two previous positions he held.

In this capacity, he also steered Spain's foreign policy during its six-month presidency of the Council of the European Union.

Piqué maintained a clear atlanticist stance and defended Spain's coalition with the U.S. government that precipitated the 2003 invasion of Iraq. In 2006 he admitted "very serious mistakes" in the invasion, although he added that the existence of weapons of mass destruction was a conviction shared by everyone.

In the face of the 2002 Venezuelan coup d'état attempt, Piqué and the Spanish government maintained a position of support to the institutional legality represented by President Hugo Chávez, but did not treat the event as a coup d'état in spite of having mobilized the Ambassador in Venezuela to hold a meeting with Pedro Carmona. On 15 April he supported the return of Chávez as an "opportunity for democracy" In 2004 Piqué assured that they believed that Carmona, at that time, had assumed the position of President of Venezuela when they were aware of a supposed resignation of Chávez.

=== Minister of Science and Technology: 2002–2003 ===
As part of a cabinet reshuffle, he was replaced by Ana de Palacio y del Valle-Lersundi and instead took over the Ministry of Science and Technology, which oversees the telecommunications industry. At the time, he was thought to have paid the price for failing to resolve the protracted dispute with the UK over the future of Gibraltar.

During his mandate, he developed the Internet law and promoted the General Telecommunications Law.

In those years he already began to be considered as a possible successor to Aznar in the leadership of the national People's Party, but he was finally sent to lead the People's Party of Catalonia.

=== In Catalonia ===
Piqué became president of the People's Party of Catalonia in 2002 and, being a candidate to the Catalan elections of 2003, had the objective of capturing the votes that could be obtained by the ruling Catalanist conservative Convergence and Union party, having maintained a very close relationship with the Catalan establishment. He turned the PP of Catalonia towards a moderate and Catalanist conservative position, further away from the centralism defended by the national PP. In fact, he succeeded in getting the PP to participate in the first negotiations of a new Statute of Autonomy of Catalonia.

He resigned from this position in July 2007 after disagreement over the political direction that the central PP wanted to impose over the regional branch.

Piqué was member of the Parliament of Catalonia between 23 December 2003 and 26 July 2007. During this period of time, between 2003 and 2007, he was also senator appointed by the Catalan Parliament.

== Business career ==
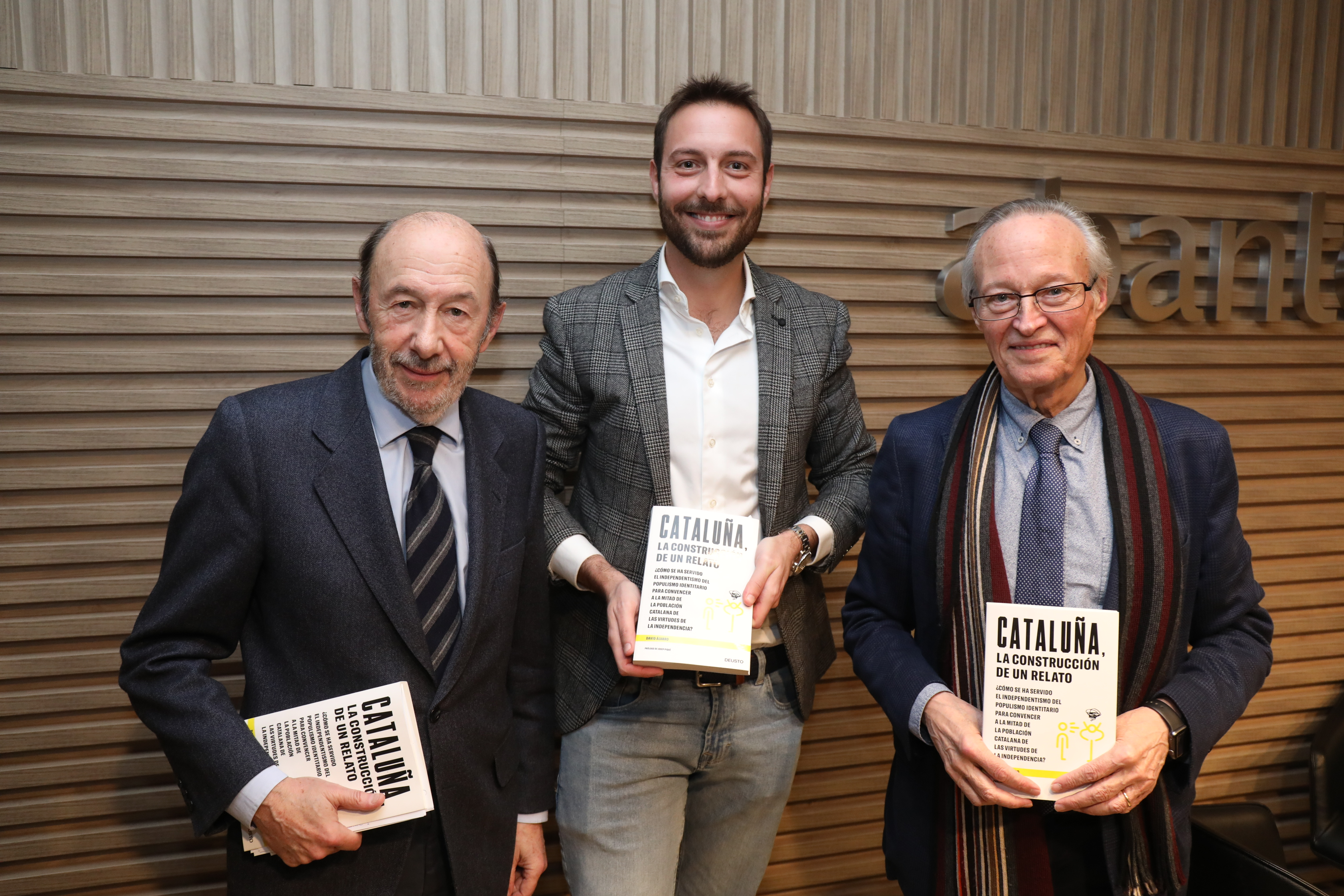
Piqué with Alfredo Pérez Rubalcaba (left) and David Alvaro in January 2019

He started in the business world in the 1980s, when Macià Alavedra introduced him to the circles of the Spanish subsidiary of the Kuwait Investment Authority group. Previously, he had been appointed chief economist in the research department of La Caixa bank, until 1985.

After his time at the General Directorate of Industry of the Catalan government, Piqué returned to the private sector, when he was called by the businessman Javier de la Rosa to become CEO and president of the chemical company Ercros in 1989. Between 1989 and 1992 he also chaired the company Erkimia. Already involved in the important business and economic circles of Catalonia, Piqué was appointed president, in 1995, of the Cercle d'Economia, until 1996, when he was appointed minister of the Spanish government.

Between November 2007 and 2013, Piqué served as chairman of low-cost carrier Vueling Airlines.

In November 2008, Piqué was co-chair of the Global China Business Meeting 2008 in Madrid. From November 2008 until June 2009, Piqué served as member of a six-member panel of EU experts advising the Bulgarian government. Set up by Bulgaria's Prime Minister Sergei Stanishev, the advisory board was chaired by Dominique de Villepin and mandated to recommend ways to help the country adjust to EU membership. In addition, Piqué served on the Political Sponsorship Committee of the Institut de Prospective Economique du Monde Méditerranéen (IPEMED).

In 2009 he launched Pangea21 Consultora Internacional, a small firm in Barcelona to provide consulting services and management advice in all kinds of international business.

Piqué was appointed member of the board of directors of Amadeus IT Group in June 2019.

== Personal life and death ==
Piqué married gynaecologist Margarita Montaner, with whom he had three children, but they divorced. In 2009, he married journalist Gloria Lomana.

Piqué died at Hospital 12 de Octubre, in Madrid, on 6 April 2023, at age 68. The funeral service was held at the M-30 mortuary in Madrid the following day.

== Recognition ==
Piqué's oratory was recognized as sharp and brilliant, and he maintained the policy of dialogue, negotiation and moderate conservatism as the axis of his political mood, as well as defender of the autonomic system. He maintained a profile of a discreet and observant politician.

In September 2023, Piqué was posthumously awarded the Premio In Memoriam in the inaugural Premios Vanguardia, presented at the National Museum of Art of Catalonia in Barcelona in 2023 by the King Felipe of Spain.

Political offices
Preceded by Abel Matutes	Minister of Foreign Affairs; 27 April 2000 – 9 July 2002	Succeeded by Ana de Palacio
Preceded by Alberto Fernández Díaz	Chairman of the Partido Popular de Cataluña; 2003–2007	Succeeded by Daniel Sirera
