= Cristina Garmendia =

Spanish biologist and businesswoman (born 1962)

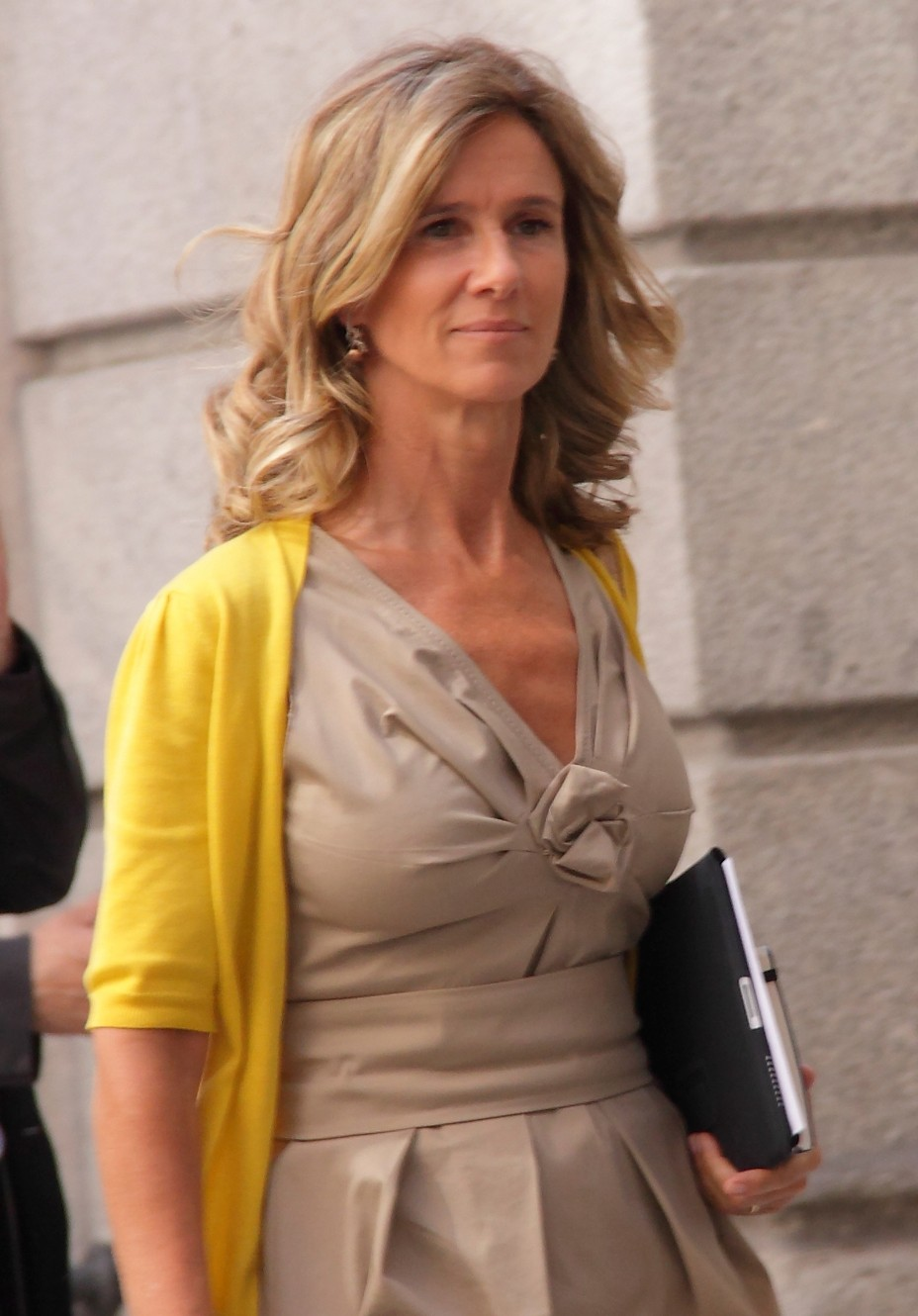
Cristina Garmendia

Cristina Garmendia y Mendizábal (born 1962 in San Sebastián) is a Spanish biologist and businesswoman. With no previous political career, she was appointed as Minister of Science and Innovation in April 2008 by the President of the Government of Spain, Jose Luis Rodriguez Zapatero.

With a PhD in biology from the Universidad Autónoma de Madrid, before her election as a minister, she was the president of the Inbiomed Foundation and the Spanish Society of Bio enterprises. In 2000, she founded Genetrix, a biotechnology company and in 2008 YSIOS, a venture capital firm, specialized in health and biotechnology. She was also a member of the board of the Spanish Confederation of Employers' Organizations (CEOE). After her term was over, Garmendia has taken up again her management side as member of YSIOS.

She is a shareholder of Genetrix, and a member of scientific or advisory boards for many organizations, such as the Women for Africa Foundation. and the Colombian Government's Productive Transformation Program International Advisory Board. She is also an active board member of a number of Spanish companies, branch organizations and a top business school.

== Early life and education ==
Garmendia was born in 1962 in San Sebastián (Basque Country). At age 18 she studied biology at the University of Seville, where she graduated specializing in genetics. Subsequently, she moved to Madrid, where she has lived since the 1980s. In Madrid she combined her PhD in the CSIC from the Centro de Biología Molecular Severo Ochoa, and her experience as assistant professor in the department of genetics and molecular biology in the Universidad Autónoma de Madrid. She received her PhD from the Severo Ochoa Molecular Biology Center at the Universidad Autónoma de Madrid under the guidance of Professor Margarita Salas. She completed her education with an Executive MBA program at IESE, University of Navarra.

== Business career, 1992–2008 ==
As a result of the MBA, Garmendia linked her Biology experience within the management activity. In 1992, as vice president and CFO, she was in charge on various responsibilities related to business development of Grupo Amasua, dedicated to the fishing industry. She held that position until 2001.

In 2000 she founded Genetrix together with Carlos Martínez and Antonio Bernad, Professors of the CSIC. Today Genetrix is involved in the development of biomedical technology and drugs. Genetrix was the first private firm that resulted from an investigation of the National Center of Biotechnology. Researchers of the department of immunology and oncology (DIO) of this center joined their research experience for this private initiative as a way to further develop their results of their investigations. The work of Garmendia was pioneer in that field as it helped lay the foundations in the Spanish biotechnology industry, transferring research outputs to the private sector. Garmendia has held positions of CEO, managing director of Genetrix, and in parallel, also promoted other business projects like Cellerix, Biotherapix, Sensia, Imbiosis, Biobide, BioAlma and Coretherapix. After many corporate operations and mergers, the Genetrix Corporation has many stock holdings in Xpol, Biobide, Corotherapix, Axontherapix, Fenix Biotech and Tigenix. Since 2012 X-Pol quotes in Germany after the agreement with the German quoted SYGNIS.

In 1997 she restarted Inbiomed, a research foundation that holds the first adult stem cells bank in Spain, and the venture capital YSIOS Capital Partners in 2008, where they successfully raised a €69 million fund, specialized in Biotech and Health. In March 2005, Dr. Garmendia was elected president of the Spanish Bioindustry Association (Asebio), association of enterprises of the bio sector; subsequently, in 2006, she was invited to join the board of the Spanish Confederation of Employers' Organizations (CEOE), a position that she held until 2008 when she is appointed Minister of Science and Innovation of Spain.

Because of her entrepreneurial spirit in the field of Biotech and biomedicine, she was awarded with the 2006 "Fermín de la Sierra" prize of the Escuela de Organización Industrial, EOI. And in 2008 she was awarded the "Tambor de Oro", maximum distinction from her native city, which is given to those who promote the image of San Sebastian. This price came to recognize the work of Mrs. Garmendia creating a pool of Biotech firm in the Technological Park of San Sebastian and her work in the field of innovation.

== Political career, 2008–2011 ==
On April 11, 2008, the president of the Spanish Government, Jose Luis Rodriguez Zapatero, elected Garmendia as holder of a new ministry, Minister of Science and Innovation, which was going to be created during the IX term of office.

The Ministry of Science and Innovation for the first time drew together all the Government's capacities and bodies to promote R&D, including Public Research Bodies, the Instituto de Salud Carlos III and the Centro para el Desarrollo Tecnológico Industrial (CDTI). The Ministry was created with the mandate to fully harness the economic potential the scientific capacity of the country —Spain established itself as the 9th scientific power in 2010.

During her time as Minister, many ambitious programs were launched. One of them was The National Innovation Strategy or the Severo Ochoa, aimed to subsidize in an extraordinary way the best Spanish research centers. Another program passed during her time in office was the Law for Science, Technology and innovation which for the first time raised innovation to the level of law insisting on the mechanism of transfer knowledge between the public and private sectors. Although it contained reforms heavily demanded by the scientific community, like the creation of the Research State Agency and the replacement of a contract of employment instead of scholarship, the law received a lot of criticism from some scientists. In terms of public investment in R&D, 2008– 2009 were years of growth with high increases in budgets, while the period between 2010 and 2011 were years of reduction and budget freeze with consequent criticism from the scientific community. In terms of great infrastructures, during term of office of Mrs. Garmendia new infrastructures where inaugurated —the Gran Telescopio Canarias (a 10.4m telescope with a segmented primary mirror in the island of La Palma), the Spanish National Center of Human Evolution (Burgos) and the Synchrotron Light Source in Cerdanyola del Vallès. The Minister of Science and Innovation was the first and only political role of Cristina Garmendia, who is not a member the Spanish Socialist Workers' Party. After the end of her Ministry, Dr. Garmendia returned to her entrepreneurial activities in the private sector.

== Return to the private sector, 2012 ==
After the 2011 elections, Garmendia left her post as Minister of Science and Innovation on December 21, 2011, and returned to her business activities in the private sector. During 2012 Garmendia becomes board member at Everis, adviser of YSIOS and shareholder of Genetrix. Roles that she performed along with her job of advisor to diverse public and private entities. Among the noteworthy private activities, Garmendia is a member of the Professional Council of ESADE, Board of Trustees of the University Antonio de Nebrija and the University of Seville, Advisory Council of the Association Madrid Network. and member of the Council of Pelayo, an insurance company. Among the public activities she works with the Government of Colombia, as part of an international advisory board of president Santos. In addition, Garmendia has taken up her interest in promoting the creation of new base technology firms. Therefore, in May 2012, with Andreu Buenafuente and a group of Business Angels, she invested in the website Bananity. The firm closed it first firm round with €400,000 of capital.

She became member of the board of directors of CaixaBank in June 2019.

== Other activities ==
- Trilateral Commission, Member of the European Group
