= Gloria Lomana =

Spanish journalist (born 1959)

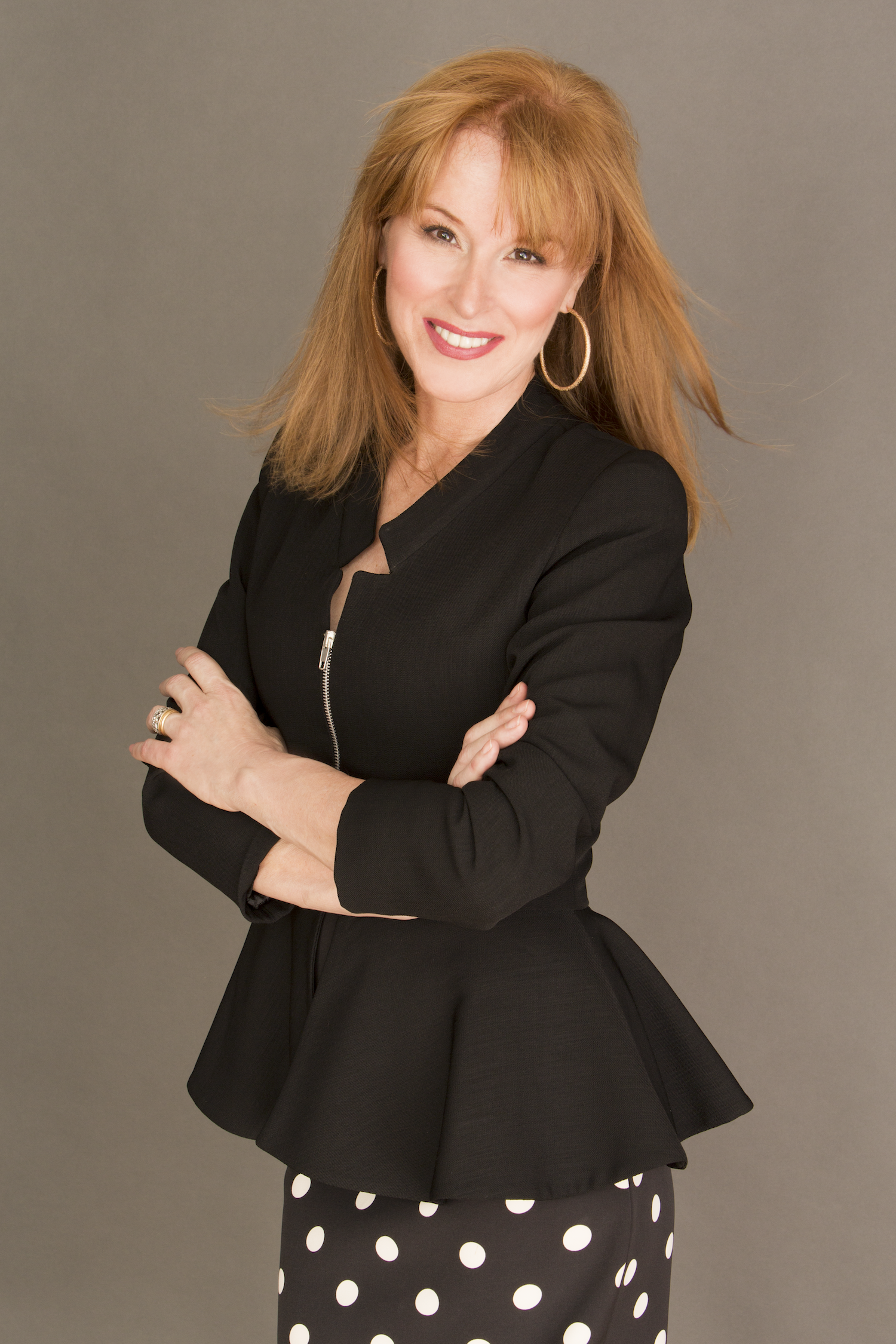
- Lomana in 2022
- Born: Gloria Fernández-Lomana Garcia; 16 June 1959; Madrid, Spain
- Education: Complutense University of Madrid
- Occupation: Journalist
- Years active: 1978–present
- Spouse: Josep Piqué

Gloria Fernández-Lomana Garcia (born 16 June 1959), more commonly known as Gloria Lomana, is a Spanish journalist. Between July 2003 and July 2016, she served as the director of information for private Spanish TV channel Antena 3.

== Biography ==
Lomana was born on 16 June 1959 in Madrid. She is a graduate of the Complutense University of Madrid in Journalism. She began her career in 1978 at Radio Centro Radiocadena Madrid and also worked on public radio station Radio Nacional de España. Lomana worked as a reporter of the Televisión Española newscast, and presented several political debate programs on La 2. She has interviewed six Prime Ministers of Spain. With the entry of shareholder José Manuel Lara Bosch into Antena 3, Lomana was named as their director of information in July 2003.

At the front of the news, Lomana attracted a larger television audience share between 2004 and 2007, and outperformed Televisión Española. She interviewed major political figures of Spain, however, during this period, she was labelled as conservative, and other media publications noted a "lack of objectivity on interviews with leaders of the Popular Party, to the detriment of others". After 13 years, she left Antena 3 in July 2016 and was replaced by Santiago González, former director of Televisión Española.

=== Awards ===
Lomana serves a member of a jury for the King Jaime I Awards for Journalism. She has been awarded the Award for Business Excellence and Professional in 2009 Circle of Businesswomen, and the Golden Master Statutory, awarded in 2010 by the Senior Management Forum which recognised "her work as director of Antena 3 Noticias."

== Personal life ==
She was married to Catalan politician of the People's Party Josep Piqué, Foreign Minister of the Government of José María Aznar during the VI and VII Legislature of Spain and President of Vueling until August 2013.

== Publications ==
- "1987. El ciclón socialista, sobre la crónica de la primera legislatura socialista."
