= Juan Costa =

Spanish politician (born 1965)

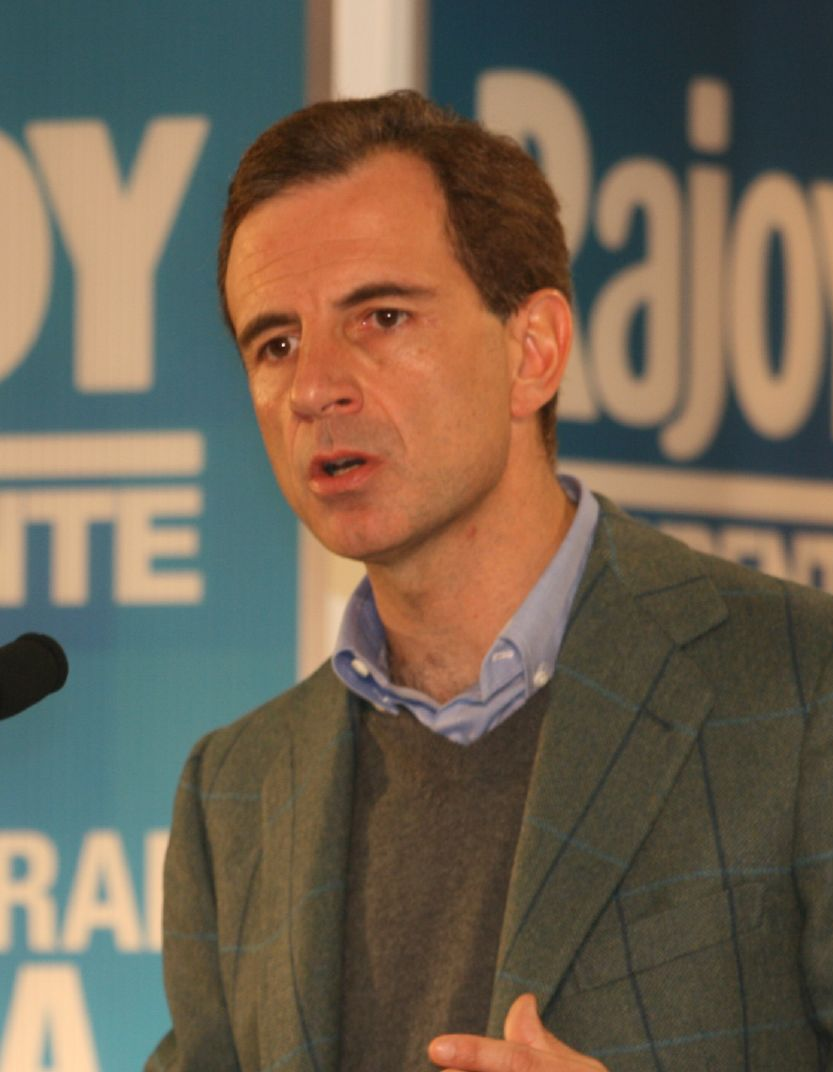

Minister of Science and Technology
- In office 4 September 2003 – 18 April 2004
- Prime Minister: José María Aznar
- Preceded by: Josep Piqué
- Succeeded by: María Jesús San Segundo (Education and Science); José Montilla (Industry, Tourism and Trade)

Personal details
- Born: Juan Costa Climent; 10 April 1965 (age 61) Castellón de la Plana, Spain
- Party: People's Party
- Education: University of Navarre

Juan Costa Climent (born 10 April 1965) is a Spanish politician, who served as Minister of Science and Technology of Spain from September 2003 to April 2004.

Costa also served as Secretary of State for Finance from 1996 to 2000 and as Secretary of State for Trade and Tourism from 2000 to 2003.
