= State Research Agency =

- Agencia Estatal de Investigación

Agency overview
- Formed: June 20, 2016; 10 years ago
- Jurisdiction: Spain
- Headquarters: Madrid, Spain
- Employees: 224 (2025)
- Annual budget: € 1.42 billion, 2025
- Agency executives: Juan Cruz Cigudosa, President; José Manuel Fernández de Labastida, Director
- Parent agency: Ministry of Science
- Website: https://www.aei.gob.es

The State Research Agency (Spanish: Agencia Estatal de Investigación, AEI) is the Spanish research funding agency responsible for the promotion of scientific and technical research in all areas of knowledge through the competitive and efficient allocation of public resources, the monitoring of actions financed and their impact, and advice on action planning or initiatives through which the R&D policies of the General State Administration are implemented.

The AEI was created in November 2015, although it came into operation on 20 June 2016 with the first meeting of the Governing Council. The Agency is chaired by the Secretary of State for Science, currently Juan Cruz Cigudosa, and the CEO is José Manuel Fernández Labastida.

== Structure ==
The structure of the State Research Agency is:

- The President. The President of the Agency is the Secretary of State for Science of the Ministry of Science.
- The Governing Council. Collective-decision-making body.
  - The Director-General. Chief executive of the AEI.
    - The Secretary-General. Responsible for the day-to-day management of the AEF and its internal services.
      - The Deputy Directorate for Economic Management of Aids
    - The Directorate for Scientific and Technological Management.
      - The Deputy Directorate for Evaluation.
      - The Deputy Directorate for Thematic Programs.
      - The Deputy Directorate for Horizontal Programs and Internationalization.
    - The Directorate for Economic Programming and Monitoring.
      - The Deputy Directorate for Grant Procedures.
      - The Deputy Directorate for Economic Monitoring.
      - The Deputy Directorate for European Funds.
    - The Support Unit.
      - The Equality Unit.
- The Control Commission. Oversees the agency's work and informs the Governing Council.
- The Scientific and technical committee of the Agency. It advises and assists the different bodies of the AEI.

== Agency bodies ==
=== Presidency ===
The president of the AEI is also the Secretary of State for Science, Innovation and Universities, being the Agency integrated in the Ministry of Science of Spain. The functions of the president are:

- To assure the maximum institutional and legal representation of the Agency, to preside over its Governing Council and to ensure the fulfillment of its object, aims and functions.
- To convene the sessions of the Governing Council.
- To resolve the tie in the votes of the Council.
- To inform all the ministries about the Agency activity.
- To conclude collaboration agreements, memoranda of understanding, execution agreements or legal instruments of any other nature that may generate commitments and obligations for the Agency, without prejudice to any delegations that may be established.
- To urge the holder of the Ministry of the Treasury to authorize any necessary budget changes.
- To propose to the Governing Council the appointment and removal of the director of the Agency.
- To propose to the Governing Council the appointment of the members of the Control Committee.
- Exercise the other powers and functions attributed to it by the Agency Statute, the Governing Council and the provisions in force.

=== Directorate-General ===
The director-general of the Agency is a civil servant appointed by the Minister of Science and Innovation. The functions of the director-general are:

- To carry out the ordinary management and management of the Agency, within the framework of the functions assigned in this section or of those that are expressly delegated to it.
- To prepare and submit to the Governing Council the proposal of the Management Contract of the Agency.
- To prepare and submit to the Governing Council the strategic and operational objectives of the Agency, and the procedures, criteria and indicators for measuring compliance and the degree of efficiency in management.
- To prepare and submit to the Governing Council the annual action plan and direct and coordinate the activities that are necessary for the development of the functions of the Agency.
- To prepare and submit to the Governing Council the preliminary draft budget of the Agency.
- To prepare the agency's annual accounts.
- To agree upon the budgetary variations deemed necessary and not to be authorized by the Minister of the Treasury and propose to the President those that require such authorization.
- To authorize, for justified reasons, the disposition of expenses, the recognition of obligations and the ordering of the corresponding payments of which it will report to the Governing Council.
- To prepare and submit to the Control Committee a monthly report on the status of budget execution.
- To propose to the Governing Council the appointment and dismissal of the Agency's management staff.
- To appoint or cease collaborators and experts of the Agency.
- Any other function attributed to it by the Governing Council.

=== General Secretariat ===
The Secretary-General, as well as the Director-General, is a civil servant. The SG functions are: The Secretary-General is responsible of the management of the horizontal services of the Agency, specifying in the following areas:

- HM of the Agency.
- Legal regime, processing of agreements and attention to the citizen.
- General services, purchases and supplies and Administrative contracting.
- General Economic Regime, in coordination with the Economic Management Branch.
- ICT4D resources.

== Directors ==
Since its creation, four people have served has director:

1. Marina Villegas Gracia (21 June 2016 – 31 December 2018). Acting.
2. Enrique Playán Jubillar (1 January 2019 – 31 December 2021)
3. Domènec Espriu Climent (1 January 2022 – 31 December 2024)
4. José Manuel Fernández de Labastida (1 January 2025 – present)

== Excellency Centers «Severo Ochoa» and Excellency Units «María de Maeztu» ==
The “Center of Excellence Severo Ochoa” and “Unit of Excellence Maria de Maeztu” Award, within the subprogram of Institutional Strengthening of the State Plan for Scientific and Technical Research and Innovation, aims to fund and accredit public research centers and units on any areas that demonstrate scientific leadership and impact at global level, as well as active collaboration in their social and business environment.

The Centers of Excellence Severo Ochoa and Units of Excellence Maria de Maeztu are organizational structures with research programmes.

The evaluation and selection process is carried out by an independent international committee of scientists.

== See also ==
- Spanish National Research Council
