= Centre for the Development of Industrial Technology =

Spanish technology development organization

- Centro para el Desarrollo Tecnológico y la Innovación

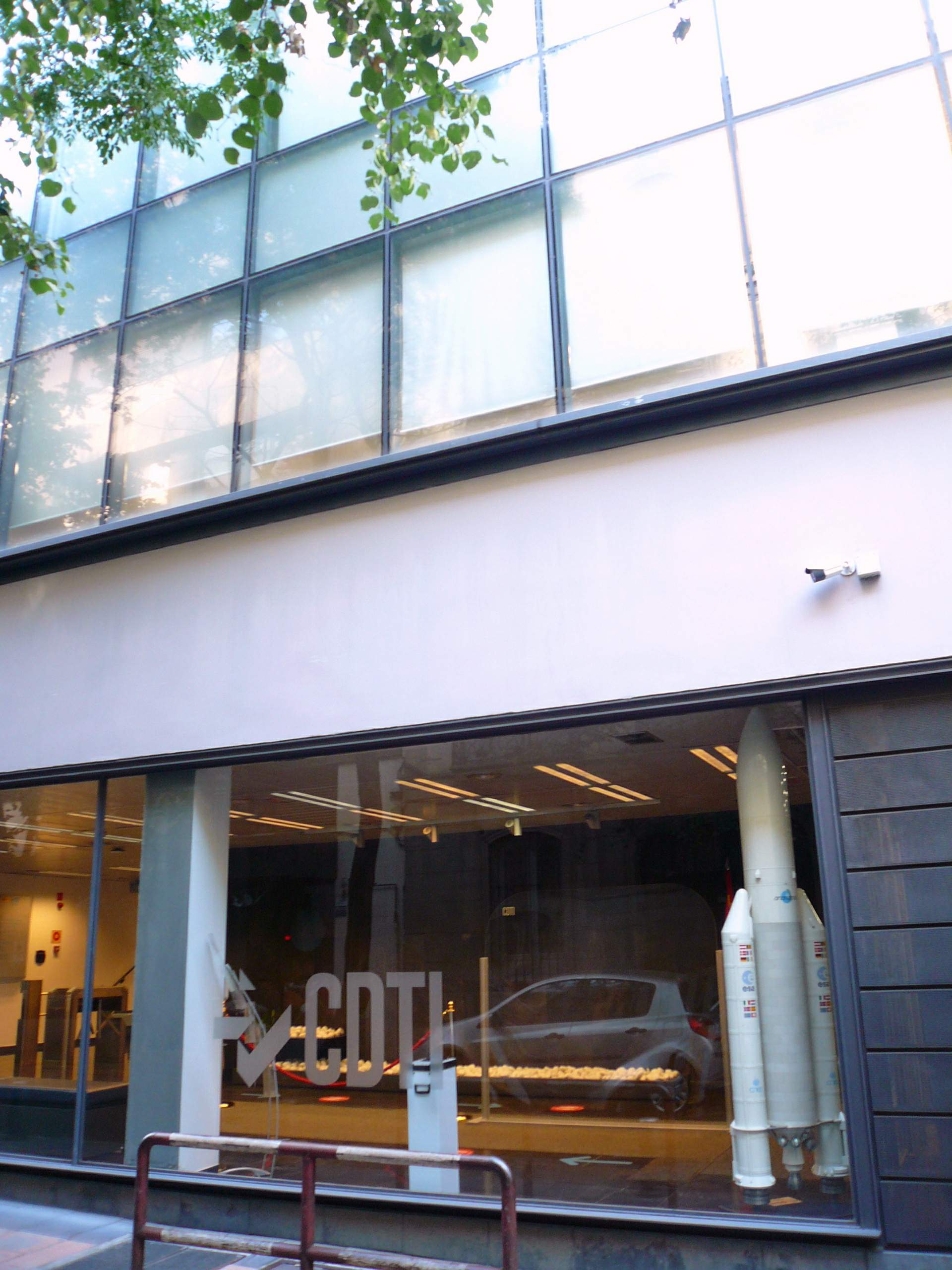
- Abbreviation: CDTI
- Formation: September 13, 1977; 49 years ago
- Type: State-owned enterprise
- Headquarters: C. del Cid, 4, Salamanca
- Owner: Government of Spain
- Secretary General: José Moisés Martín Carretero
- President: Teresa Riesgo Alcaide (Secretary-General for Innovation)
- Main organ: Secretary-General for Innovation
- Revenue: ▼803.6 m EUR (2022)
- Staff: 364 (2022)

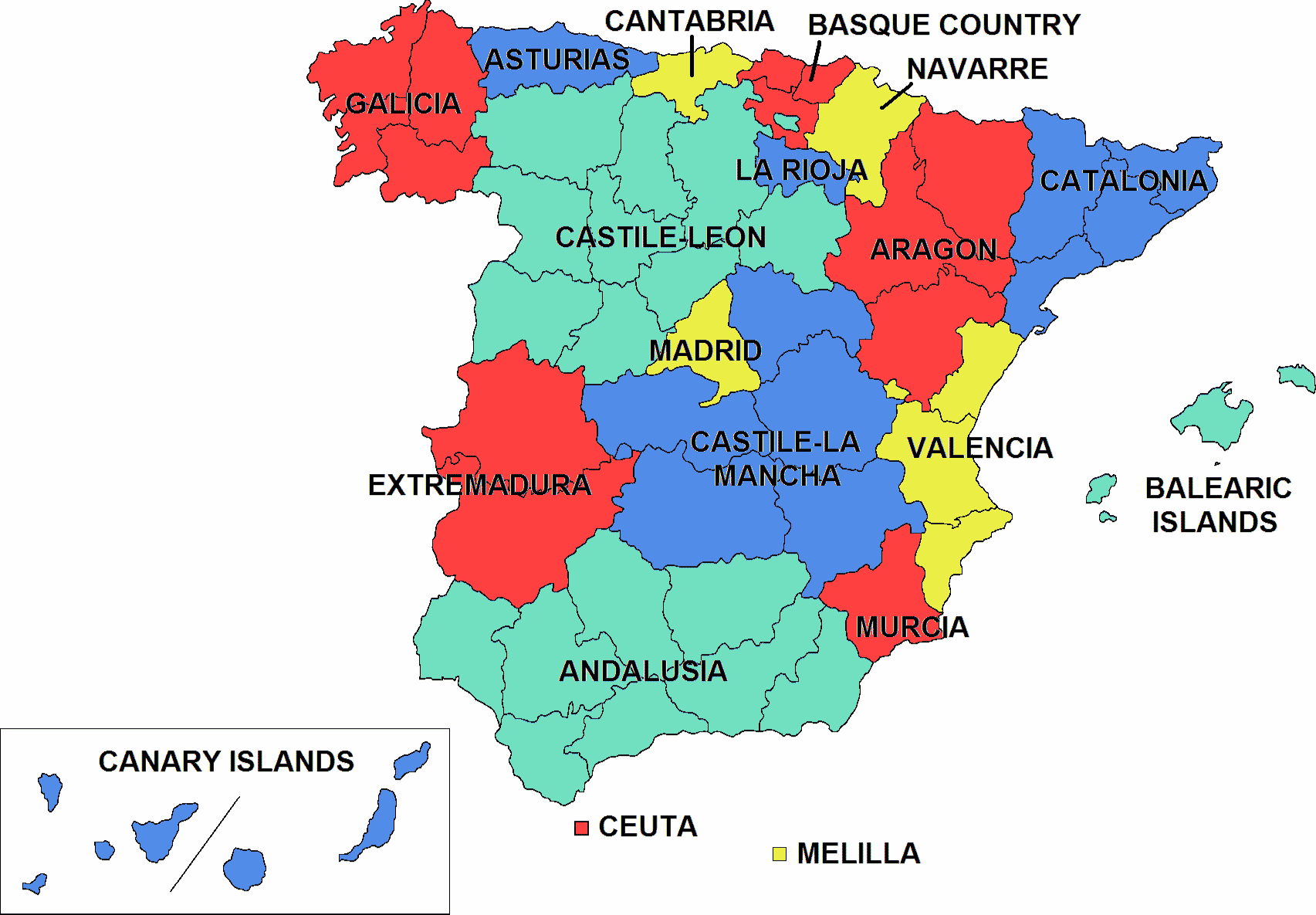
The Centre is located in Spain.

The Centre for the Development of Industrial Technology (Spanish: Centro para el Desarrollo Tecnológico Industrial; CDTI) is a public organization for technology development in the Kingdom of Spain.

== Organization ==
It was part of the Ministry of Industry, Commerce and Tourism, later was part of Ministry of Science and Innovation and now it is part of the Ministry of Economy and Competitiveness. It claims to employ one hundred fifty people. The Centre supports companies that want to develop R&D projects with loans and other financial aids. In addition, provides technical support. The Centre has presence in Japan, the Kingdom of Belgium, the Federative Republic of Brazil, the Republic of Colombia, Korea, the Republic of Chile, and the Kingdom of Morocco. In 2002, the Centre contributed 117.2 million EUR to the European Space Agency. (Its monetary contributions to the Agency have risen steadily—by numerical value, not considering inflation—since 1998, when it contributed 104.85 million EUR.)
