= First government of José María Aznar =

1996–2000 government of Spain

1st government of José María Aznar
- Government of Spain
- 1996–2000
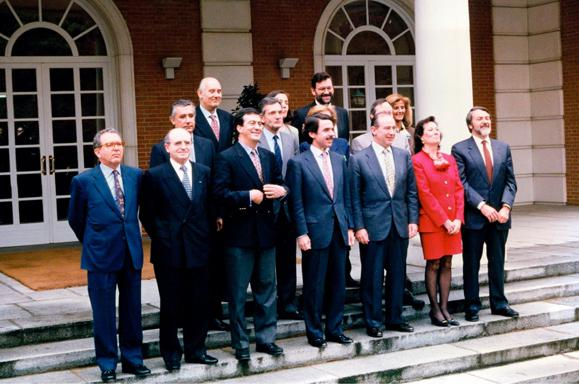
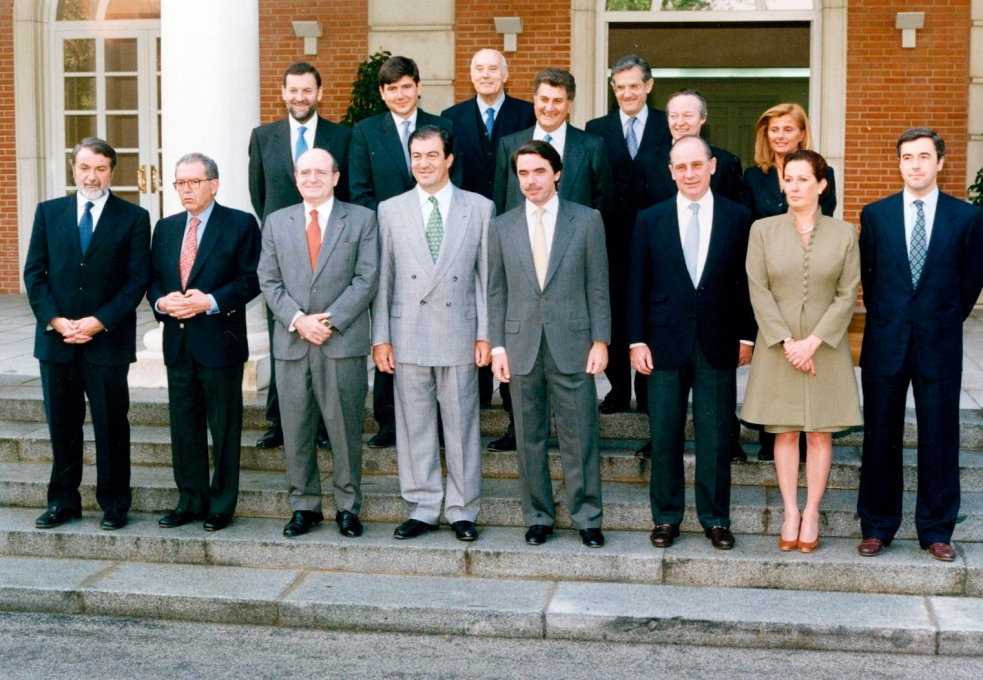
- The government in May 1996 (top) and April 1999 (bottom)
- Date formed: 6 May 1996
- Date dissolved: 28 April 2000

People and organisations
- Monarch: Juan Carlos I
- Prime Minister: José María Aznar
- Deputy Prime Ministers: First: Francisco Álvarez-Cascos; Second: Rodrigo Rato
- No. of ministers: 15 (Note: Does not include the prime minister.)
- Total no. of members: 19
- Member party: PP
- Status in legislature: Minority (single-party)
- Opposition party: PSOE
- Opposition leader: Felipe González (1996–1997); Joaquín Almunia (1997–1998); Josep Borrell (1998–1999); Joaquín Almunia (1999–2000)

History
- Election: 1996 general election
- Outgoing election: 2000 general election
- Legislature term: 6th Cortes Generales
- Budget: 1997, 1998, 1999, 2000
- Predecessor: González IV
- Successor: Aznar II

The first government of José María Aznar was formed on 6 May 1996, following the latter's election as prime minister of Spain by the Congress of Deputies on 4 May and his swearing-in on 5 May, as a result of the People's Party (PP) emerging as the largest parliamentary force at the 1996 Spanish general election. It succeeded the fourth González government and was the government of Spain from 6 May 1996 to 28 April 2000, a total of 1,453 days, or 3 years, 11 months and 22 days.

The cabinet comprised members of the PP and a number of independents. It was automatically dismissed on 13 March 2000 as a consequence of the 2000 general election, but remained in acting capacity until the next government was sworn in.

== Investiture ==
Investiture; Congress of Deputies; Nomination of José María Aznar (PP)
Ballot →	4 May 1996
Required majority →	176 out of 350
Yes: • PP (156); • CiU (16); • PNV (5); • CC (4)	181 / 350
No: • PSOE (141); • IU–IC (21); • BNG (2); • ERC (1); • EA (1)	166 / 350
Abstentions: • UV (1)	1 / 350
Absentees: • HB (2)	2 / 350

== Cabinet changes ==
Aznar's first government saw a number of cabinet changes during its tenure:

- On 16 July 1998, Josep Piqué was assigned the functions of Spokesperson of the Government after the resignation of Miguel Ángel Rodríguez as Secretary of State for Press on 10 July. The office had been vacant de jure since the new government was sworn into office in May 1996, but Rodríguez exercised as de facto spokesperson by attending press conferences held after the councils of ministers until his resignation and Piqué's subsequent appointment.
- On 19 January 1999, following the nomination of Javier Arenas and Esperanza Aguirre to become new secretary-general of the People's Party (PP) and President of the Senate of Spain, respectively, a cabinet reshuffle ensued which saw Manuel Pimentel being named as new Minister of Labour and Social Affairs, whereas Mariano Rajoy replaced Aguirre in Education and Culture. Ángel Acebes was appointed to fill Rajoy's vacancy in the Public Administrations ministry.
- On 30 April 1999, Jesús Posada replaced Loyola de Palacio in the Agriculture, Fisheries and Food portfolio after the latter was nominated on 22 April to run as the PP leading candidate in the 1999 European Parliament election.
- On 21 February 2000, Manuel Pimentel resigned as Minister of Labour and Social Affairs as a result of a scandal involving irregularities conducted by one of his closest collaborators, Juan Aycart, leading Aznar to appoint Juan Carlos Aparicio as a replacement.

== Council of Ministers ==
The Council of Ministers was structured into the offices for the prime minister, the two deputy prime ministers, 14 ministries and the post of the spokesperson of the Government.

← Aznar I Government → (6 May 1996 – 28 April 2000)
Portfolio	Name	Party	Took office	Left office	Ref.
Prime Minister	José María Aznar	PP	5 May 1996	27 April 2000	
First Deputy Prime Minister; Minister of the Presidency	Francisco Álvarez-Cascos	PP	6 May 1996	28 April 2000	
Second Deputy Prime Minister; Minister of Economy and Finance	Rodrigo Rato	PP	6 May 1996	28 April 2000	
Minister of Foreign Affairs	Abel Matutes	PP	6 May 1996	28 April 2000	
Minister of Justice	Margarita Mariscal de Gante	Independent	6 May 1996	28 April 2000	
Minister of Defence	Eduardo Serra Rexach	Independent	6 May 1996	28 April 2000	
Minister of the Interior	Jaime Mayor Oreja	PP	6 May 1996	28 April 2000	
Minister of Development	Rafael Arias-Salgado	PP	6 May 1996	28 April 2000	
Minister of Education and Culture	Esperanza Aguirre	PP	6 May 1996	19 January 1999	
Minister of Labour and Social Affairs	Javier Arenas	PP	6 May 1996	19 January 1999	
Minister of Industry and Energy	Josep Piqué	Independent	6 May 1996	15 July 1998	
Minister of Agriculture, Fisheries and Food	Loyola de Palacio	PP	6 May 1996	30 April 1999	
Minister of Public Administrations	Mariano Rajoy	PP	6 May 1996	19 January 1999	
Minister of Health and Consumer Affairs	José Manuel Romay Beccaría	PP	6 May 1996	28 April 2000	
Minister of Environment	Isabel Tocino	PP	6 May 1996	28 April 2000	
Spokesperson of the Government (Note: On 8 May 1996 Miguel Ángel Rodríguez was appointed as Secretary of State for Press. From such a post he attended press conferences after the councils of ministers, exercising as de facto spokesperson, without ever being officially appointed as such.)	Miguel Ángel Rodríguez	PP	8 May 1996	10 July 1998	
=== Changes July 1998 ===
Portfolio	Name	Party	Took office	Left office	Ref.
Minister of Industry and Energy; Spokesperson of the Government	Josep Piqué	Independent (Note: Joined the PP in January 1999.)	16 July 1998	28 April 2000	
=== Changes January 1999 ===
Portfolio	Name	Party	Took office	Left office	Ref.
Minister of Education and Culture	Mariano Rajoy	PP	19 January 1999	28 April 2000	
Minister of Labour and Social Affairs	Manuel Pimentel	PP	19 January 1999	20 February 2000	
Minister of Public Administrations	Ángel Acebes	PP	19 January 1999	28 April 2000	
=== Changes April 1999 ===
Portfolio	Name	Party	Took office	Left office	Ref.
Minister of Agriculture, Fisheries and Food	Jesús Posada	PP	30 April 1999	28 April 2000	
=== Changes February 2000 ===
Portfolio	Name	Party	Took office	Left office	Ref.
Minister of Labour and Social Affairs	Juan Carlos Aparicio	PP	21 February 2000	28 April 2000	

== Departmental structure ==
José María Aznar's first government was organised into several superior and governing units, whose number, powers and hierarchical structure varied depending on the ministerial department.

Unit/body rank

- (■) Secretary of state
- (■) Undersecretary
- (■) Director-general
- (●) Autonomous agency
- (◆) Military & intelligence agency

Office (Original name)	Portrait	Name	Took office	Left office	Alliance/party	Ref.
=== Prime Minister's Office ===
Prime Minister (Presidencia del Gobierno)		José María Aznar	5 May 1996	26 April 2000	PP	
Prime Minister (Presidencia del Gobierno)	11 May 1996 – 13 May 2000: (■) Cabinet of the Prime Minister's Office–Chief of Staff; (■) Deputy Chief of Staff; (■) Budget Office (from 1 Aug 1998); (■) Department of Economic and Social Affairs; (■) Department of International and Defence Affairs; (■) Department of Education and Culture; (■) Department of Analysis and Studies; (■) Department of Institutional Affairs; (■) Office for Science and Technology (est. 3 Feb 1998); (■) Budget Office (until 1 Aug 1998); (■) General Secretariat of the Prime Minister's Office; (■) Deputy General Secretariat; (■) Department of Protocol of the Prime Minister's Office; (■) Department of Security of the Prime Minister's Office; (■) Department of Infrastructure and Monitoring for Crisis Situations					
First Deputy Prime Minister (Vicepresidencia Primera del Gobierno)		Francisco Álvarez-Cascos	6 May 1996	28 April 2000	PP	
First Deputy Prime Minister (Vicepresidencia Primera del Gobierno)	See Ministry of the Presidency					
Second Deputy Prime Minister (Vicepresidencia Segunda del Gobierno)		Rodrigo Rato	6 May 1996	28 April 2000	PP	
Second Deputy Prime Minister (Vicepresidencia Segunda del Gobierno)	See Ministry of Economy and Finance					
=== Ministry of Foreign Affairs ===
Ministry of Foreign Affairs (Ministerio de Asuntos Exteriores)		Abel Matutes	6 May 1996	28 April 2000	PP	
Ministry of Foreign Affairs (Ministerio de Asuntos Exteriores)	11 May 1996 – 12 December 1998: (■) State Secretariat for Foreign Policy and for the European Union; (■) General Secretariat for Foreign Policy and for the European Union; (■) Directorate-General for Technical Affairs of the European Union; (■) Directorate-General for Foreign Policy for Europe and North America; (■) Directorate-General for Foreign Policy for Ibero-America; (■) Directorate-General for Foreign Policy for Africa, Asia and the Pacific; (■) Directorate-General for the United Nations, Security and Disarmament; (■) General Secretariat for International Cooperation and for Ibero-America; (■) Directorate-General for Cultural and Scientific Relations; (■) Directorate-General for International Economic Relations; (■) Undersecretariat of Foreign Affairs; (■) Technical General Secretariat; (■) Directorate-General for the Foreign Service; (■) Directorate-General for Protocol, Chancery and Orders–Introducer of Ambassadors (from 2 Sep 1996); (■) Directorate-General for Legal and Consular Affairs; (■) Directorate-General for Protocol, Chancery and Orders–Introducer of Ambassadors (until 2 Sep 1996); (■) Directorate-General of the Office for Diplomatic Information; 12 December 1998 – 13 May 2000: (■) State Secretariat for Foreign Policy and for the European Union; (■) General Secretariat for Foreign Policy and for the European Union; (■) Directorate-General for Political Affairs and for the United Nations; (■) Directorate-General for Foreign Policy for Europe; (■) Directorate-General for Security and Disarmament and for Foreign Policy for North America; (■) Directorate-General for Foreign Policy for Ibero-America; (■) Directorate-General for Foreign Policy for Africa, Asia and the Pacific; (■) Directorate-General for Coordination of General and Technical Affairs of the European Union; (■) Directorate-General for the Internal Market and other European Union Policies; (■) General Secretariat for International Cooperation and for Ibero-America; (■) Directorate-General for Cultural and Scientific Relations; (■) Directorate-General for International Economic Relations; (■) Undersecretariat of Foreign Affairs; (■) Technical General Secretariat; (■) Directorate-General for the Foreign Service; (■) Directorate-General for Protocol, Chancery and Orders–Introducer of Ambassadors; (■) Directorate-General for Legal and Consular Affairs; (■) Directorate-General of the Office for Diplomatic Information					
=== Ministry of Justice ===
Ministry of Justice (Ministerio de Justicia)		Margarita Mariscal de Gante	6 May 1996	28 April 2000	PP (Independent)	
Ministry of Justice (Ministerio de Justicia)	11 May 1996 – 13 May 2000: (■) State Secretariat for Justice; (■) Directorate-General for Registries and Notaries; (■) Directorate-General for Conscientious Objection; (■) Directorate-General for Relations with the Administration of Justice; (■) Directorate-General of the State Legal Service; (■) Directorate-General for Religious Affairs; (■) Undersecretariat of Justice; (■) Technical General Secretariat					
=== Ministry of Defence ===
Ministry of Defence (Ministerio de Defensa)		Eduardo Serra Rexach	6 May 1996	28 April 2000	PP (Independent)	
Ministry of Defence (Ministerio de Defensa)	11 May 1996 – 27 January 2001: (■) State Secretariat for Defence; (■) Directorate-General for Armament and Materiel; (■) Directorate-General for Economic Affairs; (■) Directorate-General for Infrastructure; (■) Undersecretariat of Defence; (■) Technical General Secretariat; (■) Directorate-General for Personnel; (■) Directorate-General for Military Recruitment and Teaching; (■) Directorate-General for Defence Policy; (◆) Defence Staff–Chief of the Defence Staff; (◆) Army–Chief of Staff of the Army; (◆) Navy–Chief of Staff of the Navy; (◆) Air Force–Chief of Staff of the Air Force; (◆) Superior Centre of Defence Information; (■) Directorate-General of the Superior Centre of Defence Information; (■) General Secretariat of the Superior Centre of Defence Information (D/G 8 Jun 1996)					
=== Ministry of Economy and Finance ===
Ministry of Economy and Finance (Ministerio de Economía y Hacienda)		Rodrigo Rato	6 May 1996	28 April 2000	PP	
Ministry of Economy and Finance (Ministerio de Economía y Hacienda)	8 May 1996 – 13 May 2000: (■) State Secretariat for Finance; (■) Directorate-General for Taxes; (■) Directorate-General for Coordination with the Territorial Treasuries; (■) Directorate-General of the Centre for Cadastral Management and Tax Cooperation (disest. 2 Sep 1996); (■) Directorate-General for the Cadastre (est. 2 Sep 1996); (■) Central Economic-Administrative Court; (■) Government Delegation on the Tobacco Monopoly; (■) State Secretariat for Budgets and Expenditure; (■) Office of the Comptroller General of the State Administration; (■) Directorate-General for Budgets; (■) Directorate-General for Personnel Costs and Public Pensions; (■) Directorate-General for Budgetary Analysis and Programming; (■) State Secretariat for Economy; (■) Directorate-General for the Treasury and Financial Policy; (■) Directorate-General for Insurance; (■) Directorate-General for Economic Policy and Competition Defence; (■) State Secretariat for Trade, Tourism and Small and Medium-sized Enterprises; (■) General Secretariat for Foreign Trade (est. 20 May 1998); (■) Directorate-General for Internal Trade; (■) Directorate-General for Foreign Trade (disest. 20 May 1998); (■) Directorate-General for Trade Policy and Foreign Investments; (■) Directorate-General for Small and Medium-sized Enterprises Policy; (■) Directorate-General for Tourism; (■) Undersecretariat of Economy and Finance; (■) Technical General Secretariat; (■) Directorate-General for the State Heritage; (■) Inspectorate-General of the Ministry of Economy and Finance					
=== Ministry of the Interior ===
Ministry of the Interior (Ministerio del Interior)		Jaime Mayor Oreja	6 May 1996	28 April 2000	PP	
Ministry of the Interior (Ministerio del Interior)	8 May 1996 – 12 May 2000: (■) State Secretariat for Security; (■) Directorate-General of the Police; (■) Directorate-General of the Civil Guard; (■) Directorate-General for Security Administration; (■) Government Delegation for the National Plan on Drugs; (■) Directorate-General for Penitentiary Institutions; (■) Undersecretariat of the Interior; (■) Technical General Secretariat; (■) Directorate-General for Internal Policy; (■) Directorate-General for Civil Protection; (■) Directorate-General for Traffic					
=== Ministry of Development ===
Ministry of Development (Ministerio de Fomento)		Rafael Arias-Salgado	6 May 1996	28 April 2000	PP	
Ministry of Development (Ministerio de Fomento)	11 May 1996 – 13 May 2000: (■) State Secretariat for Infrastructure and Transport; (■) Directorate-General for Roads; (■) Directorate-General for Railways and Road Transport; (■) Directorate-General for the Merchant Marine; (■) Directorate-General for Civil Aviation; (■) Undersecretariat of Development; (■) Technical General Secretariat; (■) Directorate-General for Economic and Budgetary Programming; (■) Directorate-General for Housing and Urbanism (disest. 2 Sep 1996); (■) Directorate-General for Housing, Architecture and Urbanism (est. 2 Sep 1996); (■) Directorate-General of the National Geographic Institute; (■) General Secretariat for Communications; (■) Directorate-General for Telecommunications (disest. 7 Sep 1997)					
=== Ministry of Education and Culture ===
Ministry of Education and Culture (Ministerio de Educación y Cultura)		Esperanza Aguirre	6 May 1996	19 January 1999	PP	
Ministry of Education and Culture (Ministerio de Educación y Cultura)		Mariano Rajoy	19 January 1999	28 April 2000	PP	
Ministry of Education and Culture (Ministerio de Educación y Cultura)	11 May 1996 – 24 January 1999: (■) State Secretariat for Universities, Research and Development; (■) Directorate-General for Higher Education (disest. 3 Feb 1998); (■) Directorate-General for Research and Development (disest. 3 Feb 1998); (■) Directorate-General for Higher Education and Scientific Research (est. 3 Feb 1998); (■) State Secretariat for Culture; (■) Directorate-General for Fine Arts and Cultural Property; (■) Directorate-General for Books, Archives and Libraries; (■) Directorate-General for Cultural Cooperation and Communication; (■) General Secretariat for Education and Vocational Training; (■) Directorate-General for Educational Centers; (■) Directorate-General for Vocational Training and Educational Promotion; (■) Directorate-General for Coordination and High Inspection; (■) Undersecretariat of Education and Culture; (■) Technical General Secretariat; (■) Directorate-General for Economic Programming and Budgetary Control; (■) Directorate-General for Personnel and Services; (●) High Council for Sports; (■) President's Office of the High Council for Sports; (■) Directorate-General for Sports; (■) Directorate-General for Sports Infrastructure and Services; 24 January 1999 – 13 May 2000: (■) State Secretariat for Education, Universities, Research and Development; (■) General Secretariat for Education and Vocational Training; (■) Directorate-General for Educational Centers; (■) Directorate-General for Vocational Training and Educational Promotion; (■) Directorate-General for Coordination and High Inspection; (■) Directorate-General for Higher Education and Scientific Research; (■) State Secretariat for Culture; (■) Directorate-General for Fine Arts and Cultural Property; (■) Directorate-General for Books, Archives and Libraries; (■) Directorate-General for Cultural Cooperation and Communication; (■) Undersecretariat of Education and Culture; (■) Technical General Secretariat; (■) Directorate-General for Economic Programming and Budgetary Control; (■) Directorate-General for Personnel and Services; (●) High Council for Sports; (■) President's Office of the High Council for Sports; (■) Directorate-General for Sports; (■) Directorate-General for Sports Infrastructure and Services					
=== Ministry of Labour and Social Affairs ===
Ministry of Labour and Social Affairs (Ministerio de Trabajo y Asuntos Sociales)		Javier Arenas	6 May 1996	19 January 1999	PP	
Ministry of Labour and Social Affairs (Ministerio de Trabajo y Asuntos Sociales)		Manuel Pimentel	19 January 1999	20 February 2000 (resigned)	PP	
Ministry of Labour and Social Affairs (Ministerio de Trabajo y Asuntos Sociales)		Juan Carlos Aparicio	21 February 2000	28 April 2000	PP	
Ministry of Labour and Social Affairs (Ministerio de Trabajo y Asuntos Sociales)	11 May 1996 – 13 May 2000: (■) State Secretariat for Social Security; (■) Directorate-General for Social Security Management; (■) Office of the Comptroller General of the Social Security; (■) Undersecretariat of Labour and Social Affairs; (■) Technical General Secretariat; (■) Directorate-General for Labour and Social Security Inspection; (■) General Secretariat for Employment; (■) Directorate-General for Labour and Migration (disest. 7 Feb 1997); (■) Directorate-General for Labour (est. 7 Feb 1997); (■) Directorate-General for Promotion of the Social Economy (est. 7 Feb 1997; disest. 29 Oct 1998); (■) Directorate-General for Promotion of the Social Economy and the European Social Fund (est. 29 Oct 1998); (■) General Secretariat for Social Affairs; (■) Directorate-General for Social, Minors and Family Action; (■) Directorate-General for Migration Management (est. 7 Feb 1997)					
=== Ministry of Industry and Energy ===
Ministry of Industry and Energy (Ministerio de Industria y Energía)		Josep Piqué	6 May 1996	28 April 2000	PP (PP from Jan 1999; Indep. until Jan 1999)	
Ministry of Industry and Energy (Ministerio de Industria y Energía)	11 May 1996 – 30 September 1998: (■) State Secretariat for Energy and Mineral Resources; (■) Directorate-General for Mines; (■) Directorate-General for Energy; (■) Undersecretariat of Industry and Energy; (■) Technical General Secretariat; (■) Directorate-General for Industry; (■) Directorate-General for Technology and Industrial Security; 30 September 1998 – 13 May 2000: (■) State Secretariat for Industry and Energy; (■) Directorate-General for Industry and Technology; (■) Directorate-General for Energy; (■) Directorate-General for Mines; (■) Directorate-General for Industries and Information Technologies; (■) Undersecretariat of Industry and Energy; (■) Technical General Secretariat					
=== Ministry of Agriculture, Fisheries and Food ===
Ministry of Agriculture, Fisheries and Food (Ministerio de Agricultura, Pesca y Alimentación)		Loyola de Palacio	6 May 1996	30 April 1999	PP	
Ministry of Agriculture, Fisheries and Food (Ministerio de Agricultura, Pesca y Alimentación)		Jesús Posada	30 April 1999	28 April 2000	PP	
Ministry of Agriculture, Fisheries and Food (Ministerio de Agricultura, Pesca y Alimentación)	11 May 1996 – 15 July 1998: (■) Undersecretariat of Agriculture, Fisheries and Food; (■) Technical General Secretariat; (■) General Secretariat for Agriculture and Food; (■) Directorate-General for Agricultural Productions and Markets; (■) Directorate-General for Livestock Productions and Markets; (■) Directorate-General for Agricultural Production Health; (■) Directorate-General for Rural Planning and Development; (■) Directorate-General for Food Policy and Agricultural and Food Industries; (■) General Secretariat for Maritime Fisheries; (■) Directorate-General for Fishery Resources; (■) Directorate-General for Fishing Structures and Markets; 15 July 1998 – 13 May 2000: (■) Undersecretariat of Agriculture, Fisheries and Food; (■) Technical General Secretariat; (■) General Secretariat for Agriculture and Food; (■) Directorate-General for Agriculture; (■) Directorate-General for Livestock; (■) Directorate-General for Rural Development; (■) Directorate-General for Food; (■) General Secretariat for Maritime Fisheries; (■) Directorate-General for Fishery Resources; (■) Directorate-General for Fishing Structures and Markets					
=== Ministry of the Presidency ===
Ministry of the Presidency (Ministerio de la Presidencia)		Francisco Álvarez-Cascos	6 May 1996	28 April 2000	PP	
Ministry of the Presidency (Ministerio de la Presidencia)	8 May 1996 – 20 May 2000: (■) State Secretariat for Relations with the Cortes; (■) Directorate-General for Relations with the Cortes; (■) State Secretariat for Press; (■) General Secretariat for Information (est. 2 Sep 1996); (■) Directorate-General for Communication (disest. 2 Sep 1996); (■) Undersecretariat of the Presidency; (■) Technical General Secretariat; (■) Directorate-General of the Government Secretariat					
=== Ministry of Public Administrations ===
Ministry of Public Administrations (Ministerio de Administraciones; Públicas)		Mariano Rajoy	6 May 1996	19 January 1999	PP	
Ministry of Public Administrations (Ministerio de Administraciones; Públicas)		Ángel Acebes	19 January 1999	28 April 2000	PP	
Ministry of Public Administrations (Ministerio de Administraciones; Públicas)	11 May 1996 – 13 May 2000: (■) State Secretariat for Public Administration; (■) Directorate-General for the Civil Service; (■) Directorate-General for Administrative Organization; (■) Inspectorate-General for Public Administration Services (disest. 25 Dec 1998); (■) Directorate-General for Services Inspection, Simplification and Quality (est. 25 Dec 1998); (■) State Secretariat for Territorial Administrations; (■) Directorate-General for Territorial Cooperation (disest. 12 Sep 1997); (■) Directorate-General for Territorial Legal and Economic Regime (disest. 12 Sep 1997); (■) Directorate-General for Regional Cooperation (est. 12 Sep 1997); (■) Directorate-General for the Local Administration (est. 12 Sep 1997); (■) Undersecretariat of Public Administrations; (■) Technical General Secretariat					
=== Ministry of Health and Consumer Affairs ===
Ministry of Health and Consumer Affairs (Ministerio de Sanidad y Consumo)		José Manuel Romay Beccaría	6 May 1996	28 April 2000	PP	
Ministry of Health and Consumer Affairs (Ministerio de Sanidad y Consumo)	11 May 1996 – 20 May 2000: (■) Undersecretariat of Health and Consumer Affairs; (■) Technical General Secretariat; (■) Directorate-General for Public Health; (■) Directorate-General for Pharmacy and Health Products; (■) General Secretariat for Healthcare–National Institute of Health; (■) Directorate-General for Health Organization and Planning; (■) Directorate-General for Primary and Specialized Care; (■) Directorate-General for Budgets and Investments; (■) Directorate-General for Human Resources					
=== Ministry of Environment ===
Ministry of Environment (Ministerio de Medio Ambiente)		Isabel Tocino	6 May 1996	28 April 2000	PP	
Ministry of Environment (Ministerio de Medio Ambiente)	11 May 1996 – 13 May 2000: (■) State Secretariat for Water and Coasts; (■) Directorate-General for Hydraulic Works and Water Quality; (■) Directorate-General for Coasts; (■) Undersecretariat of Environment; (■) Technical General Secretariat; (■) Directorate-General of the National Institute of Meteorology; (■) General Secretariat for Environment; (■) Directorate-General for Nature Conservation; (■) Directorate-General for Environmental Quality and Evaluation					
=== Spokesperson of the Government ===
Spokesperson of the Government (Portavoz del Gobierno)		Miguel Ángel Rodríguez (de facto)	8 May 1996	10 July 1998 (resigned)	PP	
Spokesperson of the Government (Portavoz del Gobierno)		Josep Piqué	16 July 1998	28 April 2000	PP (PP from Jan 1999; Indep. until Jan 1999)	

== See also ==
- Governments of José María Aznar

== Notes ==
Preceded by González IV	Government of Spain; 1996–2000	Succeeded by Aznar II
