= Second government of José María Aznar =

2000–2004 government of Spain

2nd government of José María Aznar
- Government of Spain
- 2000–2004
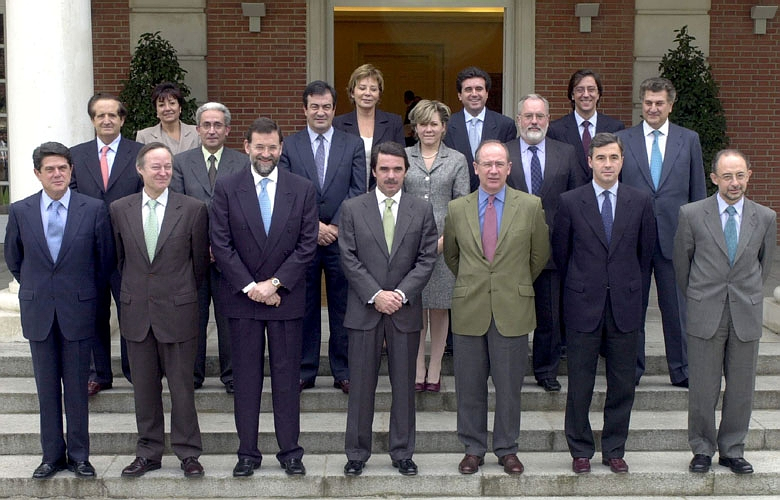
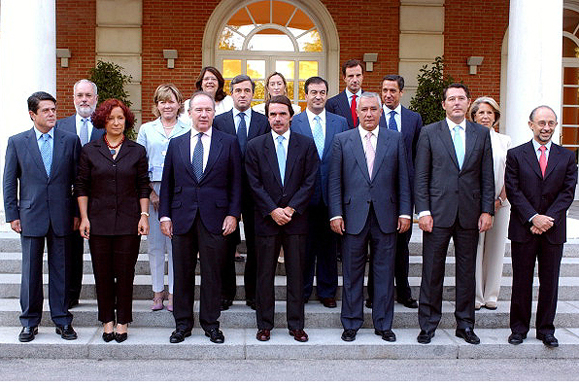
- The government in March 2001 (top) and September 2003 (bottom)
- Date formed: 28 April 2000
- Date dissolved: 18 April 2004

People and organisations
- Monarch: Juan Carlos I
- Prime Minister: José María Aznar
- Deputy Prime Ministers: First: Mariano Rajoy (2000–2003); Rodrigo Rato (2003–2004); Second: Rodrigo Rato (2000–2003); Javier Arenas (2003–2004)
- No. of ministers: 16 (Note: Does not include the prime minister.) (2000–2002); 15 (2002–2004)
- Total no. of members: 25
- Member party: PP
- Status in legislature: Majority (single-party)
- Opposition party: PSOE
- Opposition leader: José Luis Rodríguez Zapatero

History
- Election: 2000 general election
- Outgoing election: 2004 general election
- Legislature term: 7th Cortes Generales
- Budget: 2001, 2002, 2003, 2004
- Predecessor: Aznar I
- Successor: Zapatero I

The second government of José María Aznar was formed on 28 April 2000, following the latter's election as prime minister of Spain by the Congress of Deputies on 26 April and his swearing-in on 27 April, as a result of the People's Party (PP) emerging as the largest parliamentary force at the 2000 Spanish general election. It succeeded the first Aznar government and was the government of Spain from 28 April 2000 to 18 April 2004, a total of 1,451 days, or 3 years, 11 months and 21 days.

The cabinet comprised members of the PP and a number of independents. It was automatically dismissed on 15 March 2004 as a consequence of the 2004 general election, but remained in acting capacity until the next government was sworn in.

== Investiture ==
Investiture; Congress of Deputies; Nomination of José María Aznar (PP)
Ballot →	26 April 2000
Required majority →	176 out of 350
Yes: • PP (183); • CiU (15); • CC (4)	202 / 350
No: • PSOE (125); • IU (8); • PNV (7); • BNG (3); • PA (1); • ERC (1); • ICV (1); • EA (1); • CHA (1)	148 / 350
Abstentions	0 / 350
Absentees	0 / 350

== Cabinet changes ==
Aznar's second government saw a number of cabinet changes during its tenure:

- On 28 February 2001, Jaime Mayor Oreja stepped down as Minister of the Interior in order to run as the People's Party (PP)'s leading candidate for Lehendakari in the 2001 Basque regional election. He was succeeded in his office by Mariano Rajoy, who in turn was replaced in the Presidency ministry by Juan José Lucas.
- On 10 July 2002, a major cabinet reshuffle saw Ana de Palacio replacing Josep Piqué as Minister of Foreign Affairs, who in turn replaced Anna Birulés as Minister of Science and Technology. Rajoy was reassigned the Ministry of the Presidency as well as the functions of Spokesperson of the Government, with Ángel Acebes being appointed for the Interior portfolio. José María Michavila filled the vacancy left by Acebes in the Ministry of Justice, whereas President of the Valencian Government Eduardo Zaplana replaced Juan Carlos Aparicio as Minister of Labour and Social Affairs. Javier Arenas replaced Jesús Posada as Minister of Public Administrations and Ana Pastor replaced Celia Villalobos in Health and Consumer Affairs. Aznar attempted to draw Convergence and Union (CiU) into a coalition government, with little success.
- On 3 March 2003, Elvira Rodríguez replaced Jaume Matas as Minister of Environment, who stepped down in order to run as the PP leading candidate for President of the Balearic Islands in the 2003 Balearic regional election.
- On 4 September 2003, Josep Piqué and Mariano Rajoy were dismissed from the government as a result of being nominated as the PP leading candidates for the 2003 Catalan regional and 2004 Spanish general elections, respectively. This prompted a new reshuffle which saw Rodrigo Rato being promoted to First Deputy Prime Minister, Arenas becoming new Second Deputy Prime Minister and Minister of the Presidency, Zaplana being assigned the functions of Spokesperson of the Government, Julia García-Valdecasas becoming new Minister of Public Administrations and Juan Costa filling Piqué's vacancy in the Science and Technology ministry.

== Council of Ministers ==
The Council of Ministers was structured into the offices for the prime minister, the two deputy prime minister, 15 ministries and the post of the spokesperson of the Government. Until July 2002, the latter's officeholder had the rank of minister without portfolio and an office of its own.

← Aznar II Government → (28 April 2000 – 18 April 2004)
Portfolio	Name	Party	Took office	Left office	Ref.
Prime Minister	José María Aznar	PP	27 April 2000	17 April 2004	
First Deputy Prime Minister; Minister of the Presidency	Mariano Rajoy	PP	28 April 2000	28 February 2001	
Second Deputy Prime Minister for Economic Affairs; Minister of Economy	Rodrigo Rato	PP	28 April 2000	4 September 2003	
Minister of Foreign Affairs	Josep Piqué	PP	28 April 2000	10 July 2002	
Minister of Justice	Ángel Acebes	PP	28 April 2000	10 July 2002	
Minister of Defence	Federico Trillo	PP	28 April 2000	18 April 2004	
Minister of Finance	Cristóbal Montoro	PP	28 April 2000	18 April 2004	
Minister of the Interior	Jaime Mayor Oreja	PP	28 April 2000	28 February 2001	
Minister of Development	Francisco Álvarez-Cascos	PP	28 April 2000	18 April 2004	
Minister of Education, Culture and Sports	Pilar del Castillo	PP	28 April 2000	18 April 2004	
Minister of Labour and Social Affairs	Juan Carlos Aparicio	PP	28 April 2000	10 July 2002	
Minister of Agriculture, Fisheries and Food	Miguel Arias Cañete	PP	28 April 2000	18 April 2004	
Minister of Public Administrations	Jesús Posada	PP	28 April 2000	10 July 2002	
Minister of Health and Consumer Affairs	Celia Villalobos	PP	28 April 2000	10 July 2002	
Minister of Environment	Jaume Matas	PP	28 April 2000	3 March 2003	
Minister of Science and Technology	Anna Birulés	Independent	28 April 2000	10 July 2002	
Spokesperson Minister of the Government, without portfolio	Pío Cabanillas Alonso	Independent	28 April 2000	10 July 2002	
=== Changes February 2001 ===
Portfolio	Name	Party	Took office	Left office	Ref.
First Deputy Prime Minister; Minister of the Interior	Mariano Rajoy	PP	28 February 2001	10 July 2002	
Minister of the Presidency	Juan José Lucas	PP	28 February 2001	10 July 2002	
=== Changes July 2002 ===
Portfolio	Name	Party	Took office	Left office	Ref.
First Deputy Prime Minister; Minister of the Presidency; Spokesperson of the Government (Note: On 10 July 2002, the office of the Spokesperson of the Government was restructured into a ministry-adscribed post.)	Mariano Rajoy	PP	10 July 2002	4 September 2003	
Minister of Foreign Affairs	Ana Palacio	PP	10 July 2002	18 April 2004	
Minister of Justice	José María Michavila	PP	10 July 2002	18 April 2004	
Minister of the Interior	Ángel Acebes	PP	10 July 2002	18 April 2004	
Minister of Labour and Social Affairs	Eduardo Zaplana	PP	10 July 2002	4 September 2003	
Minister of Public Administrations	Javier Arenas	PP	10 July 2002	4 September 2003	
Minister of Health and Consumer Affairs	Ana Pastor	PP	10 July 2002	18 April 2004	
Minister of Science and Technology	Josep Piqué	PP	10 July 2002	4 September 2003	
=== Changes March 2003 ===
Portfolio	Name	Party	Took office	Left office	Ref.
Minister of Environment	Elvira Rodríguez	PP	3 March 2003	18 April 2004	
=== Changes September 2003 ===
Portfolio	Name	Party	Took office	Left office	Ref.
First Deputy Prime Minister; Minister of Economy	Rodrigo Rato	PP	4 September 2003	18 April 2004	
Second Deputy Prime Minister (Note: Following Mariano Rajoy's stepping down as First Deputy Prime Minister on 4 September 2003, the post of the Second Deputy Prime Minister for Economic Affairs was rebranded as the post of the Second Deputy Prime Minister.); Minister of the Presidency	Javier Arenas	PP	4 September 2003	18 April 2004	
Minister of Labour and Social Affairs; Spokesperson of the Government	Eduardo Zaplana	PP	4 September 2003	18 April 2004	
Minister of Public Administrations	Julia García-Valdecasas	PP	4 September 2003	18 April 2004	
Minister of Science and Technology	Juan Costa	PP	4 September 2003	18 April 2004	

== Departmental structure ==
José María Aznar's second government was organised into several superior and governing units, whose number, powers and hierarchical structure varied depending on the ministerial department.

Unit/body rank

- (■) Secretary of state
- (■) Undersecretary
- (■) Director-general
- (●) Autonomous agency
- (◆) Military & intelligence agency

Office (Original name)	Portrait	Name	Took office	Left office	Alliance/party	Ref.
=== Prime Minister's Office ===
Prime Minister (Presidencia del Gobierno)		José María Aznar	26 April 2000	17 April 2004	PP	
Prime Minister (Presidencia del Gobierno)	13–27 May 2000: (■) Cabinet of the Prime Minister's Office–Chief of Staff; (■) Deputy Chief of Staff; (■) Budget Office; (■) Department of Economic and Social Affairs; (■) Department of International and Defence Affairs; (■) Department of Education and Culture; (■) Department of Analysis and Studies; (■) Department of Institutional Affairs; (■) General Secretariat of the Prime Minister's Office; (■) Deputy General Secretariat; (■) Department of Protocol of the Prime Minister's Office; (■) Department of Security of the Prime Minister's Office; (■) Department of Infrastructure and Monitoring for Crisis Situations; 27 May 2000 – 20 April 2004: (■) Cabinet of the Prime Minister's Office–Chief of Staff; (■) Deputy Chief of Staff; (■) Budget Office; (■) Department of Economy; (■) Department of International and Security Affairs; (■) Department of Welfare and Education; (■) Department of Parliament and Institutions; (■) Department of Studies and Political Communication; (■) General Secretariat of the Prime Minister's Office; (■) Deputy General Secretariat; (■) Department of Protocol; (■) Department of Security; (■) Department of Infrastructure and Monitoring for Crisis Situations					
First Deputy Prime Minister (Vicepresidencia Primera del Gobierno)		Mariano Rajoy	28 April 2000	4 September 2003	PP	
First Deputy Prime Minister (Vicepresidencia Primera del Gobierno)		Rodrigo Rato	4 September 2003	18 April 2004	PP	
First Deputy Prime Minister (Vicepresidencia Primera del Gobierno)	See Ministry of the Presidency (28 April 2000 – 28 February 2001; 10 July 2002 – 4 September 2003); See Ministry of the Interior (28 February 2001 – 10 July 2002); See Ministry of Economy (4 September 2003 – 18 April 2004)					
Second Deputy Prime Minister for Economic Affairs (Vicepresidencia Segunda del Gobierno para Asuntos; Económicos) (until 4 September 2003) Second Deputy Prime Minister (Vicepresidencia Segunda del Gobierno) (from 4 September 2003)		Rodrigo Rato	28 April 2000	4 September 2003	PP	
Second Deputy Prime Minister for Economic Affairs (Vicepresidencia Segunda del Gobierno para Asuntos; Económicos) (until 4 September 2003) Second Deputy Prime Minister (Vicepresidencia Segunda del Gobierno) (from 4 September 2003)		Javier Arenas	4 September 2003	18 April 2004	PP	
Second Deputy Prime Minister for Economic Affairs (Vicepresidencia Segunda del Gobierno para Asuntos; Económicos) (until 4 September 2003) Second Deputy Prime Minister (Vicepresidencia Segunda del Gobierno) (from 4 September 2003)	See Ministry of Economy (28 April 2000 – 4 September 2003); See Ministry of the Presidency (4 September 2003 – 18 April 2004)					
=== Ministry of Foreign Affairs ===
Ministry of Foreign Affairs (Ministerio de Asuntos Exteriores)		Josep Piqué	28 April 2000	10 July 2002	PP	
Ministry of Foreign Affairs (Ministerio de Asuntos Exteriores)		Ana Palacio	10 July 2002	18 April 2004	PP	
Ministry of Foreign Affairs (Ministerio de Asuntos Exteriores)	13 May 2000 – 20 April 2004: (■) State Secretariat for European Affairs; (■) General Secretariat for European Affairs; (■) Directorate-General for Foreign Policy for Europe; (■) Directorate-General for Coordination of General and Technical Affairs of the European Union; (■) Directorate-General for the Internal Market and other European Union Policies; (■) State Secretariat for Foreign Affairs; (■) General Secretariat for Foreign Policy; (■) Directorate-General for Foreign Policy for North America and for Security and Disarmament (disest. 29 Dec 2002); (■) Directorate-General for Security, Disarmament and International Affairs of Terrorism (est. 29 Dec 2002); (■) Directorate-General for Foreign Policy for the Mediterranean, the Middle East and Africa; (■) Directorate-General for Foreign Policy for Asia and the Pacific (disest. 29 Dec 2002); (■) Directorate-General for Foreign Policy for Asia, the Pacific and North America (est. 29 Dec 2002); (■) Directorate-General for International Economic Relations; (■) State Secretariat for International Cooperation and for Ibero-America; (■) Directorate-General for Foreign Policy for Ibero-America; (■) Directorate-General for Cultural and Scientific Relations (disest. 29 Dec 2000); (■) Undersecretariat of Foreign Affairs; (■) Technical General Secretariat; (■) Directorate-General for the Foreign Service; (■) Directorate-General for Protocol, Chancery and Orders–Introducer of Ambassadors; (■) Directorate-General for Consular Affairs and Protection of Spaniards Abroad; (■) Directorate-General of the Office for Diplomatic Information					
=== Ministry of Justice ===
Ministry of Justice (Ministerio de Justicia)		Ángel Acebes	28 April 2000	10 July 2002	PP	
Ministry of Justice (Ministerio de Justicia)		José María Michavila	10 July 2002	18 April 2004	PP	
Ministry of Justice (Ministerio de Justicia)	13 May 2000 – 20 April 2004: (■) State Secretariat for Justice; (■) Directorate of the State Legal Service (disest. 5 Aug 2000); (■) Office of the Solicitor General of the State–Directorate of the State Legal Service (est. 5 Aug 2000); (■) Directorate-General for Registries and Notaries; (■) Directorate-General for Relations with the Administration of Justice; (■) Directorate-General for Conscientious Objection (disest. 1 Dec 2001); (■) Directorate-General for Modernization of the Administration of Justice (est. 1 Dec 2001); (■) Directorate-General for Religious Affairs; (■) Undersecretariat of Justice; (■) Directorate-General for Legislative Policy and International Legal Cooperation; (■) Technical General Secretariat					
=== Ministry of Defence ===
Ministry of Defence (Ministerio de Defensa)		Federico Trillo	28 April 2000	18 April 2004	PP	
Ministry of Defence (Ministerio de Defensa)	11 May 1996 – 11 May 2002: (■) State Secretariat for Defence; (■) Directorate-General for Armament and Materiel; (■) Directorate-General for Economic Affairs; (■) Directorate-General for Infrastructure; (■) Undersecretariat of Defence; (■) Technical General Secretariat; (■) Directorate-General for Personnel; (■) Directorate-General for Military Recruitment and Teaching; (■) Directorate-General for Defence Policy (until 27 Jan 2001); (■) General Secretariat for Defence Policy (est. 27 Jan 2001); (■) Directorate-General for Defence Policy (from 27 Jan 2001); (■) Directorate-General for Institutional Defence Relations (est. 27 Jan 2001); (◆) Defence Staff–Chief of the Defence Staff; (◆) Army–Chief of Staff of the Army; (◆) Navy–Chief of Staff of the Navy; (◆) Air Force–Chief of Staff of the Air Force; (◆) Superior Centre of Defence Information; (■) Directorate-General of the Superior Centre of Defence Information (disest. 30 Jun 2001); (■) State Secretariat–Directorate of the Superior Centre of Defence Information (est. 30 Jun 2001); 11 May 2002 – 20 April 2004: (■) State Secretariat for Defence; (■) Directorate-General for Armament and Materiel; (■) Directorate-General for Economic Affairs; (■) Directorate-General for Infrastructure; (■) Undersecretariat of Defence; (■) Technical General Secretariat; (■) Directorate-General for Personnel; (■) Directorate-General for Military Recruitment and Teaching; (■) General Secretariat for Defence Policy; (■) Directorate-General for Defence Policy; (■) Directorate-General for Institutional Defence Relations; (◆) Defence Staff–Chief of the Defence Staff; (◆) Army–Chief of Staff of the Army; (◆) Navy–Chief of Staff of the Navy; (◆) Air Force–Chief of Staff of the Air Force; (◆) National Intelligence Centre; (■) State Secretariat–Directorate of the National Intelligence Centre; (■) General Secretariat of the National Intelligence Centre; (■) Technical Directorate for Resources; (■) Technical Directorate for Intelligence					
=== Ministry of Finance ===
Ministry of Finance (Ministerio de Hacienda)		Cristóbal Montoro	28 April 2000	18 April 2004	PP	
Ministry of Finance (Ministerio de Hacienda)	13 May 2000 – 20 April 2004: (■) State Secretariat for Finance; (■) General Secretariat for Territorial and Community Fiscal Policy; (■) Directorate-General for Taxes; (■) Directorate-General for the Cadastre; (■) Central Economic-Administrative Court; (■) Institute for Fiscal Studies (disest. 27 Jan 2001); (■) State Secretariat for Budgets and Expenditure; (■) Office of the Comptroller General of the State Administration; (■) Directorate-General for Budgets; (■) Directorate-General for Personnel Costs and Public Pensions; (■) Directorate-General for Community Funds and Territorial Financing; (■) Undersecretariat of Finance; (■) Technical General Secretariat; (■) Directorate-General for the State Heritage; (■) Inspectorate-General of the Ministry of Finance					
=== Ministry of the Interior ===
Ministry of the Interior (Ministerio del Interior)		Jaime Mayor Oreja	28 April 2000	28 February 2001	PP	
Ministry of the Interior (Ministerio del Interior)		Mariano Rajoy	28 February 2001	10 July 2002	PP	
Ministry of the Interior (Ministerio del Interior)		Ángel Acebes	10 July 2002	18 April 2004	PP	
Ministry of the Interior (Ministerio del Interior)	12 May 2000 – 20 April 2004: (■) State Secretariat for Security; (■) Directorate-General of the Police; (■) Directorate-General of the Civil Guard; (■) Directorate-General for Security Administration (disest. 29 Jul 2000); (■) Directorate-General for Security Infrastructure and Material (est. 29 Jul 2000); (■) Government Delegation for Foreigners and Immigration; (■) Directorate-General for Foreigners and Immigration (est. 20 May 2000); (■) Government Delegation for the National Plan on Drugs; (■) Directorate-General for Penitentiary Institutions; (■) Undersecretariat of the Interior; (■) Technical General Secretariat; (■) Directorate-General for Internal Policy; (■) Directorate-General for Civil Protection; (■) Directorate-General for Traffic					
=== Ministry of Development ===
Ministry of Development (Ministerio de Fomento)		Francisco Álvarez-Cascos	28 April 2000	18 April 2004	PP	
Ministry of Development (Ministerio de Fomento)	13 May 2000 – 20 April 2004: (■) State Secretariat for Infrastructure; (■) Directorate-General for Roads; (■) Directorate-General for Railways (est. 30 Aug 2000); (■) Directorate-General for Housing, Architecture and Urbanism; (■) Directorate-General for Economic Programming; (■) Undersecretariat of Development; (■) Technical General Secretariat; (■) Directorate-General for Organization, Procedure and Control; (■) Directorate-General of the National Geographic Institute; (■) Directorate-General for Railways and Road Transport (disest. 30 Aug 2000); (■) Directorate-General for Road Transport (est. 30 Aug 2000); (■) Directorate-General for the Merchant Marine; (■) Directorate-General for Civil Aviation					
=== Ministry of Education, Culture and Sports ===
Ministry of Education, Culture and Sports (Ministerio de Educación, Cultura y Deporte)		Pilar del Castillo	28 April 2000	18 April 2004	PP	
Ministry of Education, Culture and Sports (Ministerio de Educación, Cultura y Deporte)	13 May 2000 – 20 April 2004: (■) State Secretariat for Education and Universities; (■) General Secretariat for Education and Vocational Training; (■) Directorate-General for Education, Vocational Training and Educational Innovation; (■) Directorate-General for Territorial Cooperation and High Inspection; (■) Directorate-General for Universities; (■) State Secretariat for Culture; (■) Directorate-General for Fine Arts and Cultural Property; (■) Directorate-General for Books, Archives and Libraries; (■) Directorate-General for Cultural Cooperation and Communication; (■) Undersecretariat of Education, Culture and Sports; (■) Technical General Secretariat; (■) Directorate-General for Economic Programming, Personnel and Services; (●) High Council for Sports; (■) President's Office of the High Council for Sports; (■) Directorate-General for Sports; (■) Directorate-General for Sports Infrastructure and Services					
=== Ministry of Labour and Social Affairs ===
Ministry of Labour and Social Affairs (Ministerio de Trabajo y Asuntos Sociales)		Juan Carlos Aparicio	28 April 2000	10 July 2002	PP	
Ministry of Labour and Social Affairs (Ministerio de Trabajo y Asuntos Sociales)		Eduardo Zaplana	10 July 2002	18 April 2004	PP	
Ministry of Labour and Social Affairs (Ministerio de Trabajo y Asuntos Sociales)	13 May 2000 – 20 April 2004: (■) State Secretariat for Social Security; (■) Directorate-General for Social Security Economic Management; (■) Office of the Comptroller General of the Social Security; (■) Undersecretariat of Labour and Social Affairs; (■) Technical General Secretariat; (■) Directorate-General for Labour and Social Security Inspection; (■) General Secretariat for Employment; (■) Directorate-General for Labour; (■) Directorate-General for Promotion of the Social Economy and the European Social Fund; (■) General Secretariat for Social Affairs; (■) Directorate-General for Social, Minors and Family Action; (■) Directorate-General for Migration Management					
=== Ministry of Agriculture, Fisheries and Food ===
Ministry of Agriculture, Fisheries and Food (Ministerio de Agricultura, Pesca y Alimentación)		Miguel Arias Cañete	28 April 2000	18 April 2004	PP	
Ministry of Agriculture, Fisheries and Food (Ministerio de Agricultura, Pesca y Alimentación)	13 May 2000 – 20 April 2004: (■) Undersecretariat of Agriculture, Fisheries and Food; (■) Technical General Secretariat; (■) Directorate-General for Economic Planning and Institutional Coordination; (■) Directorate-General for Rural Development (1 Jul 2000 – 30 Mar 2003); (■) Directorate-General for Food (1 Jul 2000 – 30 Mar 2003); (■) General Secretariat for Agriculture and Food (until 1 Jul 2000; from 30 Mar 2003) / General Secretariat for Agriculture (1 Jul 2000 – 30 Mar 2003); (■) Directorate-General for Agriculture; (■) Directorate-General for Livestock; (■) Directorate-General for Rural Development (until 1 Jul 2000; from 30 Mar 2003); (■) Directorate-General for Food (until 1 Jul 2000; from 30 Mar 2003); (■) General Secretariat for Maritime Fisheries; (■) Directorate-General for Fishery Resources; (■) Directorate-General for Fishing Structures and Markets					
=== Ministry of the Presidency ===
Ministry of the Presidency (Ministerio de la Presidencia)		Mariano Rajoy	28 April 2000	28 February 2001	PP	
Ministry of the Presidency (Ministerio de la Presidencia)		Juan José Lucas	28 February 2001	10 July 2002	PP	
Ministry of the Presidency (Ministerio de la Presidencia)		Mariano Rajoy	10 July 2002	4 September 2003	PP	
Ministry of the Presidency (Ministerio de la Presidencia)		Javier Arenas	4 September 2003	18 April 2004	PP	
Ministry of the Presidency (Ministerio de la Presidencia)	20 May 2000 – 20 April 2004: (■) State Secretariat for Relations with the Cortes; (■) Directorate-General for Relations with the Cortes; (■) State Secretariat for Press (est. 25 Jul 2002); (■) Directorate-General for Communication of the National Area (est. 27 Jul 2002); (■) Directorate-General for Communication of the International Area (est. 27 Jul 2002); (■) Undersecretariat of the Presidency; (■) Technical General Secretariat; (■) Directorate-General of the Government Secretariat; (■) Directorate-General for Human Resources, Services and Infrastructure					
=== Ministry of Public Administrations ===
Ministry of Public Administrations (Ministerio de Administraciones; Públicas)		Jesús Posada	28 April 2000	10 July 2002	PP	
Ministry of Public Administrations (Ministerio de Administraciones; Públicas)		Javier Arenas	10 July 2002	4 September 2003	PP	
Ministry of Public Administrations (Ministerio de Administraciones; Públicas)		Julia García-Valdecasas	4 September 2003	18 April 2004	PP	
Ministry of Public Administrations (Ministerio de Administraciones; Públicas)	13 May 2000 – 20 April 2004: (■) State Secretariat for Public Administration; (■) Directorate-General for the Civil Service; (■) Directorate-General for Administrative Organization; (■) Directorate-General for Services Inspection, Simplification and Quality; (■) State Secretariat for Territorial Organization of the State; (■) Directorate-General for Regional Cooperation (disest. 20 Jul 2000); (■) Directorate-General for Regional Policy (est. 20 Jul 2000); (■) Directorate-General for the Local Administration; (■) Directorate-General for the Peripheral State Administration; (■) Undersecretariat of Public Administrations; (■) Technical General Secretariat					
=== Ministry of Health and Consumer Affairs ===
Ministry of Health and Consumer Affairs (Ministerio de Sanidad y Consumo)		Celia Villalobos	28 April 2000	10 July 2002	PP	
Ministry of Health and Consumer Affairs (Ministerio de Sanidad y Consumo)		Ana Pastor	10 July 2002	18 April 2004	PP	
Ministry of Health and Consumer Affairs (Ministerio de Sanidad y Consumo)	20 May 2000 – 3 August 2002: (■) Undersecretariat of Health and Consumer Affairs; (■) Technical General Secretariat; (■) Directorate-General for Human Resources and Economic-Budgetary Services; (■) Directorate-General for Pharmacy and Health Products; (■) Directorate-General for Public Health and Consumer Affairs; (■) General Secretariat for Health Management and Cooperation; (■) Permanent Secretariat of the Interterritorial Council of the National Health System and its Advisory Committee (disest. 27 Jul 2002); (■) Permanent Secretariat of the Interterritorial Council of the National Health System, its Advisory Committee and High Inspection (est. 27 July 2002); (■) Directorate-General for Institutional Relations and High Inspection (disest. 27 Jul 2002); (■) Directorate-General for Health Planning; 3 August 2002 – 20 April 2004: (■) Undersecretariat of Health and Consumer Affairs; (■) Technical General Secretariat; (■) Directorate-General for Human Resources and Economic-Budgetary Services; (■) Directorate-General for Pharmacy and Health Products; (■) Directorate-General for Consumer Affairs and Citizen Services; (■) General Secretariat for Health; (■) Directorate-General for Public Health; (■) Directorate-General for High Inspection and Coordination of the National Health System (disest. 30 Aug 2003); (■) Directorate-General for Health Planning, Information Systems and Benefits (disest. 30 Aug 2003); (■) Directorate-General for Cohesion of the National Health System and High Inspection (est. 30 Aug 2003); (■) National Health System Quality Agency (est. 30 Aug 2003)					
=== Ministry of Environment ===
Ministry of Environment (Ministerio de Medio Ambiente)		Jaume Matas	28 April 2000	3 March 2003	PP	
Ministry of Environment (Ministerio de Medio Ambiente)		Elvira Rodríguez	3 March 2003	18 April 2004	PP	
Ministry of Environment (Ministerio de Medio Ambiente)	13 May 2000 – 20 April 2004: (■) State Secretariat for Water and Coasts; (■) Directorate-General for Hydraulic Works and Water Quality; (■) Directorate-General for Coasts; (■) Undersecretariat of Environment; (■) Technical General Secretariat; (■) Directorate-General for Economic and Budgetary Programming and Control; (■) Directorate-General of the National Institute of Meteorology; (■) General Secretariat for Environment; (■) Directorate-General for Nature Conservation; (■) Directorate-General for Environmental Quality and Evaluation					
=== Ministry of Economy ===
Ministry of Economy (Ministerio de Economía)		Rodrigo Rato	28 April 2000	18 April 2004	PP	
Ministry of Economy (Ministerio de Economía)	13 May 2000 – 27 July 2002: (■) State Secretariat for Economy, Energy and Small and Medium-sized Enterprises; (■) General Secretariat for Economic Policy and Competition Defence; (■) Directorate-General for Economic Policy; (■) Directorate-General for Sector Policies; (■) Directorate-General for the Treasury and Financial Policy; (■) Directorate-General for Insurance (disest. 20 Jul 2000); (■) Directorate-General for Insurance and Pension Funds (est. 20 Jul 2000); (■) Directorate-General for Small and Medium-sized Enterprises Policy; (■) Directorate-General for Energy Policy and Mines; (■) State Secretariat for Trade and Tourism; (■) General Secretariat for Foreign Trade; (■) Directorate-General for Trade and Investments; (■) Directorate-General for International Financing; (■) General Secretariat for Tourism; (■) Directorate-General for Trade Policy; (■) Undersecretariat of Economy; (■) Technical General Secretariat; 27 July 2002 – 20 April 2004: (■) State Secretariat for Economy; (■) Directorate-General for Economic Policy; (■) Directorate-General for the Treasury and Financial Policy; (■) Directorate-General for Competition Defence; (■) Directorate-General for Insurance and Pension Funds; (■) State Secretariat for Trade and Tourism; (■) General Secretariat for Foreign Trade; (■) Directorate-General for Trade and Investments; (■) Directorate-General for International Financing; (■) General Secretariat for Tourism; (■) Directorate-General for Trade Policy; (■) State Secretariat for Energy, Industrial Development and Small and Medium-sized Enterprises; (■) Directorate-General for Small and Medium-sized Enterprises Policy; (■) Directorate-General for Industrial Development and Regional Incentives; (■) Directorate-General for Energy Policy and Mines; (■) Undersecretariat of Economy; (■) Technical General Secretariat					
=== Ministry of Science and Technology ===
Ministry of Science and Technology (Ministerio de Ciencia y Tecnología)		Anna Birulés	28 April 2000	10 July 2002	PP (Independent)	
Ministry of Science and Technology (Ministerio de Ciencia y Tecnología)		Josep Piqué	10 July 2002	4 September 2003	PP	
Ministry of Science and Technology (Ministerio de Ciencia y Tecnología)		Juan Costa	4 September 2003	18 April 2004	PP	
Ministry of Science and Technology (Ministerio de Ciencia y Tecnología)	13 May 2000 – 20 April 2004: (■) State Secretariat for Scientific and Technological Policy; (■) General Secretariat for Scientific Policy; (■) Directorate-General for Research; (■) Directorate-General for Technological Policy; (■) State Secretariat for Telecommunications and the Information Society; (■) Directorate-General for Telecommunications and Information Technologies; (■) Directorate-General for the Development of the Information Society; (■) Undersecretariat of Science and Technology; (■) Technical General Secretariat					
=== Spokesperson of the Government ===
Spokesperson Minister of the Government, without portfolio (Ministro Portavoz del Gobierno, sin cartera) (until 10 July 2002) Spokesperson of the Government (Portavoz del Gobierno) (from 10 July 2002)		Pío Cabanillas Alonso	28 April 2000	10 July 2002	PP (Independent)	
Spokesperson Minister of the Government, without portfolio (Ministro Portavoz del Gobierno, sin cartera) (until 10 July 2002) Spokesperson of the Government (Portavoz del Gobierno) (from 10 July 2002)		Mariano Rajoy	10 July 2002	4 September 2003	PP	
Spokesperson Minister of the Government, without portfolio (Ministro Portavoz del Gobierno, sin cartera) (until 10 July 2002) Spokesperson of the Government (Portavoz del Gobierno) (from 10 July 2002)		Eduardo Zaplana	4 September 2003	18 April 2004	PP	
Spokesperson Minister of the Government, without portfolio (Ministro Portavoz del Gobierno, sin cartera) (until 10 July 2002) Spokesperson of the Government (Portavoz del Gobierno) (from 10 July 2002)	20 May 2000 – 25 July 2002: (■) General Office for Information; (■) Department of Information Tracking; (■) General Office for Information Development and Analysis; (■) Department of Information Studies and Relations					

== See also ==
- Governments of José María Aznar

== Notes ==
Preceded by Aznar I	Government of Spain; 2000–2004	Succeeded by Zapatero I
