= 2004 PP national party congress =

- 1–3 October 2004

3,028 delegates in the National Congress Plurality needed to win
- Opinion polls
- Turnout: 2,541 (83.9%)
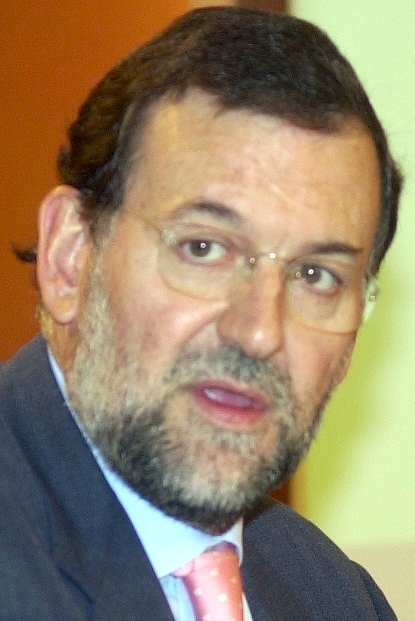

Candidate	Mariano Rajoy	Blank ballots
Delegate vote	2,479 (98.4%)	41 (1.6%)
President before election
José María Aznar
Elected President
Mariano Rajoy

The People's Party (PP) held its 15th national congress in Madrid from 1 to 3 October 2004, to renovate its governing bodies—including the post of president, which amounted to that of party leader—and establish the party platform and policy until the next congress. The congress slogan was "Spain, the hope that unites us" (Spanish: España, la ilusión que nos une), and it saw Mariano Rajoy being elected unopposed as party president, with 98.4% of the delegate vote in the congress (2,479 votes) and 1.6% of blank ballots (41).

== Overview ==
The congress of the PP was the party's supreme body, and could be of either ordinary or extraordinary nature, depending on whether it was held following the natural end of its term or due to any other exceptional circumstances not linked to this event. Ordinary congresses were to be held every three years and called at least two months in advance of their celebration. Extraordinary congresses had to be called by a two-thirds majority of the Board of Directors at least one-and-a-half month in advance of their celebration, though in cases of "exceptional urgency" this deadline could be reduced to 30 days.

The president of the PP was the party's head and the person holding the party's political and legal representation, and presided over its board of directors and executive committee, which were the party's maximum directive, governing and administration bodies between congresses. The election of the PP president was based on an indirect system, with party members voting for delegates who would, in turn, elect the president. Any party member was eligible for the post of party president, on the condition that they were up to date with the payment of party fees and were proposed by at least 50 congress delegates.

== Candidates ==
Candidate	Notable positions	Announced	Ref.
=== Proclaimed ===
Candidates who met endorsement requirements and were officially proclaimed to contest the party congress.
Mariano Rajoy (age 49)	Leader of the Opposition of Spain (since 2004); Member of the Congress of Deputies for Madrid (since 2004); Secretary-General of the PP (since 2003); Member of the Congress of Deputies for Pontevedra (1986 and 1989–2004); Spokesperson of the Government of Spain (2002–2003); Minister of the Presidency of Spain (2000–2001 and 2002–2003); First Deputy Prime Minister of Spain (2000–2003); Deputy Secretary-General of the PP (1990–2003); Minister of the Interior of Spain (2001–2002); Minister of Education and Culture of Spain (1999–2000); Minister of Public Administrations of Spain (1996–1999); President of AP/PP in the province of Pontevedra (1983–1986 and 1987–1991); Vice President of the Xunta de Galicia (1986–1987); President of the Provincial Deputation of Pontevedra (1983–1986); City Councillor of Pontevedra (1983–1986); Member of the Parliament of Galicia for Pontevedra (1981–1985); Director-General for Institutional Relations of Galicia (1982)	23 March 2004	

=== Declined ===
The individuals in this section were the subject of speculation about their possible candidacy, but publicly denied or recanted interest in running:

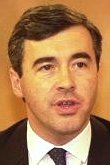
Ángel Acebes

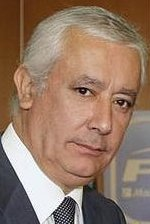
Javier Arenas

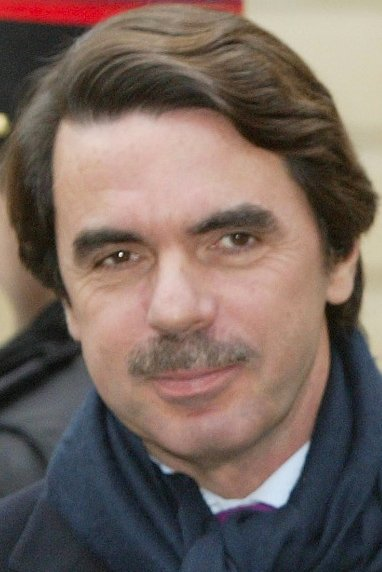
José María Aznar

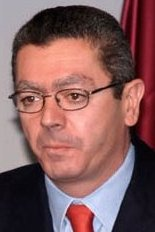
Alberto Ruiz-Gallardón

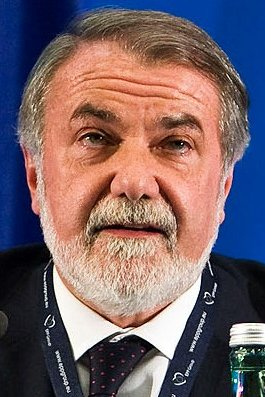
Jaime Mayor Oreja

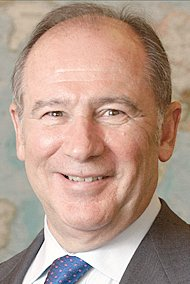
Rodrigo Rato
- Ángel Acebes (age 46) — Member of the Congress of Deputies for Ávila (since 1996); Minister of the Interior of Spain (2002–2004); Minister of Justice of Spain (2000–2002); Minister of Public Administrations of Spain (1999–2000); Coordinator-General of the PP (1996–1999); Spokesperson of the PP Group in the Senate of Spain (1995–1996); Senator for Ávila (1993–1996); Mayor of Ávila (1991–1995); City Councillor of Ávila (1987–1995).
- Javier Arenas (age 46) — President of the PP of Andalusia (1993–1999 and since 2004); Member of the Congress of Deputies for Seville (1989–1994 and since 2000); Second Deputy Prime Minister of Spain (2003–2004); Minister of the Presidency of Spain (2003–2004); Minister of Public Administrations of Spain; (2002–2003); Secretary-General of the PP (1999–2003); Minister of Labour and Social Affairs of Spain (1996–1999); Senator appointed by the Parliament of Andalusia (1994–1996); Member of the Parliament of Andalusia for Seville (1986–1989 and 1994–1996).
- José María Aznar (age 51) — President of the PP (since 1990); Prime Minister of Spain (1996–2004); Member of the Congress of Deputies for Madrid (1989–2004); President pro tempore of the Council of the European Union (2002); President of AP/PP of Castile and León (1985–1991); President of the Regional Government of Castile and León (1987–1989); Member of the Cortes of Castile and León for Ávila (1987–1989); Member of the Congress of Deputies for Ávila (1982–1987); Secretary-General of AP in La Rioja (1979–1980).
- Alberto Ruiz-Gallardón (age 45) — Mayor of Madrid (since 2003); City Councillor of Madrid (1983–1987 and since 2003); President of the Community of Madrid (1995–2003); Member of the Assembly of Madrid (1987–2003); Spokesperson of the People's Parliamentary Group in the Senate (1993–1995); Senator appointed by the Assembly of Madrid (1987–1995); Spokesperson of the People's Group in the Assembly of Madrid (1987–1993); Vice President of AP (1987–1989); Secretary-General of AP (1986–1987).
- Jaime Mayor Oreja (age 53) — Spokesperson of the PP Delegation in the European Parliament (since 2004); Member of the European Parliament for Spain (since 2004); Deputy Secretary-General of the PP (since 1996); Member of the Congress of Deputies for Álava (1996–2000 and 2004); Member of the Basque Parliament for Biscay (2001–2004); Member of the Congress of Deputies for Biscay (1989–1990 and 2000–2001); Minister of the Interior of Spain (1996–2001); Spokesperson of the People's Group in the Basque Parliament (1990–1996); Member of the Basque Parliament for Álava (1990–1996); President of the PP of the Basque Country (1989–1996); Member of the Basque Parliament for Gipuzkoa (1980 and 1984–1986); Delegate of the Government of Spain in the Basque Country (1982–1983); Member of the Congress of Deputies for Gipuzkoa (1982); Minister of Industry, Tourism and Trade of the Basque Country (1979–1980).
- Rodrigo Rato (age 55) — Managing Director of the International Monetary Fund (since 2004); First Deputy Prime Minister of Spain (2003–2004); Deputy Secretary-General of the PP (1996–2004); Member of the Congress of Deputies for Madrid (1989–2004); Second Deputy Prime Minister for Economic Affairs of Spain (2000–2003); Minister of Economy of Spain (2000–2003); Second Deputy Prime Minister of Spain (1996–2000); Minister of Economy and Finance of Spain (1996–2000); Spokesperson of the People's Parliamentary Group in the Congress (1989–1996); Member of the Congress of Deputies for Cádiz (1982–1989).

== Opinion polls ==
Poll results are listed in the tables below in reverse chronological order, showing the most recent first, and using the date the survey's fieldwork was done, as opposed to the date of publication. If such date is unknown, the date of publication is given instead. The highest percentage figure in each polling survey is displayed in bold, and the background shaded in the candidate's colour. In the instance of a tie, the figures with the highest percentages are shaded.

=== PP voters ===
Polling firm/Commissioner	Fieldwork date	Sample size										Other /None	Question	Lead
Polling firm/Commissioner	Fieldwork date	Sample size	Aznar (Inc.)	Gallardón	M. Oreja	Rajoy	Rato	Acebes	Arenas	Zaplana	De Palacio	Other /None	Question	Lead
ASEP	30 Jun–5 Jul 2003	1,212	**26.0**	15.6	10.5	16.0	5.2	0.6	4.8	–	–	1.0	20.4	10.0
Vox Pública/El Periódico	23–25 Jun 2003	1,502	–	12.6	**18.0**	12.1	15.3	–	–	–	–	42.0		2.7
Vox Pública/El Periódico	31 Mar–2 Apr 2003	1,503	–	–	**41.1**	25.0	19.2	–	–	–	–	14.7		16.1
Opina/El País	25–26 Mar 2003	1,000	–	8.3	**25.4**	17.1	14.0	1.3	–	–	–	4.1	29.8	8.3
ASEP	13–18 Jan 2003	1,215	–	9.5	**23.6**	11.0	8.9	0.3	6.3	5.6	0.3	1.0	33.5	12.6
Vox Pública/El Periódico	13–16 Jan 2003	1,501	–	–	**45.8**	20.9	22.5	–	–	–	–	10.8		23.3
ASEP	4–9 Nov 2002	1,202	–	4.5	**33.0**	8.9	8.5	–	8.2	11.2	0.9	8.8	16.0	21.8
Sigma Dos/El Mundo	5–8 Nov 2002	3,400	–	9.7	**29.5**	14.7	15.7	0.7	9.6	5.6	2.8	–	11.8	13.8
Vox Pública/El Periódico	7–9 Oct 2002	1,507	–	–	**44.2**	18.9	22.4	–	–	–	–	14.5		21.8
Opina/El País	29 Sep 2002	?	–	12.5	**32.3**	14.8	11.6	1.8	–	–	–	3.8	23.1	17.5
Vox Pública/El Periódico	24–26 Jun 2002	1,504	–	–	**46.9**	16.4	24.8	–	–	–	–	11.9		22.1
Vox Pública/El Periódico	15–17 Apr 2002	1,510	–	–	**46.1**	17.7	23.9	–	–	–	–	12.3		22.2
Vox Pública/El Periódico	4–5 Feb 2002	1,506	–	–	**45.5**	17.4	25.1	–	–	–	–	12.0		20.4

=== Spanish voters ===
Polling firm/Commissioner	Fieldwork date	Sample size										Other /None	Question	Lead
Polling firm/Commissioner	Fieldwork date	Sample size	Aznar (Inc.)	Gallardón	M. Oreja	Rajoy	Rato	Acebes	Arenas	Zaplana	De Palacio	Other /None	Question	Lead
Opina/Cadena SER	27 Aug 2003	1,000	–	**21.6**	13.9	10.6	9.7	1.4	–	–	–	4.6	38.2	7.7
ASEP	30 Jun–5 Jul 2003	1,212	11.4	**14.0**	7.2	8.9	5.0	0.3	2.9	–	–	0.8	49.4	2.6
Sigma Dos/El Mundo	24–26 Jun 2003	1,000	–	**34.5**	15.4	12.1	12.8	–	–	–	–	–	–	19.1
Vox Pública/El Periódico	23–25 Jun 2003	1,502	–	–	**31.2**	20.2	19.8	–	–	–	–	28.8		11.0
Vox Pública/El Periódico	23–25 Jun 2003	1,502	–	**11.7**	10.3	9.2	8.1	–	–	–	–	60.7		1.4
Opina/Cadena SER	28 May 2003	?	–	**24.8**	14.1	9.2	8.3	0.5	–	–	–	6.5	36.6	10.7
Noxa/La Vanguardia	22–24 Apr 2003	1,000	–	–	–	**44.0**	34.0	–	–	–	–	11.0	8.0	10.0
Opina/Cadena SER	2 Apr 2003	?	–	12.4	**16.1**	9.4	8.5	0.9	–	–	–	5.6	47.1	3.7
Vox Pública/El Periódico	31 Mar–2 Apr 2003	1,503	–	–	**37.8**	18.6	18.2	–	–	–	–	25.4		19.2
Vox Pública/El Periódico	31 Mar–2 Apr 2003	1,503	–	7.7	**16.8**	10.6	7.2	–	1.9	–	–	26.8	29.0	6.2
Opina/El País	25–26 Mar 2003	1,000	–	9.6	**16.2**	10.6	7.9	0.9	–	–	–	6.3	48.5	5.6
Opina/Cadena SER	19 Feb 2003	1,000	–	12.1	**14.4**	10.6	9.1	0.9	–	–	–	5.0	47.9	2.3
Opina/El País	3 Feb 2003	1,000	–	13.2	**17.7**	9.5	10.1	1.4	–	–	–	4.1	44.0	4.5
ASEP	13–18 Jan 2003	1,215	–	7.9	**14.6**	6.2	3.9	0.6	4.0	2.6	1.1	2.1	57.2	6.7
Vox Pública/El Periódico	13–16 Jan 2003	1,501	–	–	**39.2**	16.6	18.2	–	–	–	–	26.0		21.0
Vox Pública/El Periódico	13–16 Jan 2003	1,501	–	5.3	**15.1**	10.6	7.7	–	1.9	–	–	22.7	36.7	4.5
Opina/Cadena SER	8 Jan 2003	1,000	–	10.8	**19.7**	11.1	7.6	1.5	–	–	–	4.5	44.8	8.6
Opina/Cadena SER	4 Dec 2002	1,000	–	11.5	**20.9**	11.2	7.8	1.3	–	–	–	4.3	43.0	9.4
Opina/El País	23–24 Nov 2002	1,000	–	11.4	**20.5**	8.8	8.1	1.4	–	–	–	3.2	46.6	9.1
ASEP	4–9 Nov 2002	1,202	–	5.3	**22.4**	5.7	5.6	–	4.5	6.0	1.8	20.6	27.9	16.4
Sigma Dos/El Mundo	5–8 Nov 2002	3,400	–	11.6	**24.0**	12.0	11.9	1.5	7.5	4.1	3.5	–	23.9	12.0
Opina/Cadena SER	6 Nov 2002	1,000	–	11.1	**22.7**	8.5	7.0	1.2	–	–	–	3.4	46.1	11.6
Sigma Dos/El Mundo	14 Oct 2002	?	–	16.6	**23.0**	13.4	10.3	1.6	5.9	4.0	5.0	–	20.2	6.4
Opina/Cadena SER	9 Oct 2002	1,000	–	11.6	**22.2**	12.6	8.2	1.3	–	–	–	5.0	39.1	9.6
Vox Pública/El Periódico	7–9 Oct 2002	1,507	–	–	**39.9**	16.4	18.1	–	–	–	–	25.6		21.8
Vox Pública/El Periódico	7–9 Oct 2002	1,507	–	4.1	**16.2**	9.3	6.6	–	2.5	–	–	21.3	40.0	6.9
Opina/El País	29 Sep 2002	?	–	12.5	**21.5**	11.2	8.4	1.3	–	–	–	3.7	41.5	9.0
Opina/Cadena SER	27 Aug 2002	1,000	–	8.1	**16.0**	11.8	8.7	1.4	–	–	–	6.7	47.3	4.2
Sigma Dos/El Mundo	14 Jul 2002	?	–	7.1	**22.6**	9.0	8.6	0.3	5.0	2.3	1.5	–	43.6	13.6
Opina/Cadena SER	27 Jun 2002	1,000	–	–	**23.9**	10.7	9.3	1.7	–	–	–	6.2	48.2	13.2
Vox Pública/El Periódico	24–26 Jun 2002	1,504	–	–	**41.8**	15.0	18.7	–	–	–	–	24.5		23.1
Vox Pública/El Periódico	24–26 Jun 2002	1,504	–	4.5	**16.5**	7.2	7.1	–	1.7	–	–	21.7	41.3	9.3
Opina/Cadena SER	8 May 2002	1,000	–	–	**29.2**	11.6	11.0	–	–	–	–	–	48.2	17.6
Sigma Dos/El Mundo	3 May 2002	?	–	8.8	**18.1**	8.7	11.5	–	5.4	4.0	1.8	–	41.7	6.6
Vox Pública/El Periódico	15–17 Apr 2002	1,510	–	–	**42.1**	14.5	17.9	–	–	–	–	25.5		24.2
Vox Pública/El Periódico	15–17 Apr 2002	1,510	–	3.0	**16.0**	7.0	7.2	0.4	1.6	–	0.6	64.2		8.8
Vox Pública/El Periódico	4–5 Feb 2002	1,506	–	–	**41.4**	16.0	18.0	–	–	–	–	24.6		23.4

== Results ==
Summary of the 2 October 2004 PP congress results
Candidate	Executive	
Candidate	Votes	%
Mariano Rajoy	2,479	98.37
Blank ballots	41	1.63
Total	2,520	
Valid votes	2,520	99.17
Invalid votes	21	0.83
Votes cast / turnout	2,541	83.92
Abstentions	487	16.08
Total delegates	3,028	

Vote by delegates (Executive)
Rajoy	98.37%
Blank ballots	1.63%
