= Aznar government =

The term Aznar government may refer to:

- Aznar I Government, the government of Spain under José María Aznar from 1996 to 2000.
- Aznar II Government, the government of Spain under José María Aznar from 2000 to 2004.
