= Government of José María Aznar =

Government of José María Aznar may refer to:

- First government of José María Aznar (1996–2000)
- Second government of José María Aznar (2000–2004)
