= Javier Arenas =

Javier Arenas may refer to:

- Javier Arenas (American football) (born 1987), American football player
- Javier Arenas (Spanish politician) (born 1957), spokesman for Parliament of Andalusia and senator for Andalusia
