= Tocino (surname) =

Tocino is a surname. Notable people with the surname include:

- Isabel Tocino (born 1949), Spanish politician
