= Beka Finance =

Spanish financial services company

- Company type: Financial institution
- Industry: Financial investments
- Founded: 1989
- Headquarters: Madrid, Spain
- Key people: Carlos Tejera (Chairman); Carlos Stilianopoulos (CEO)
- AUM: €25.5bn
- Number of employees: 200+
- Website: www.bekafinance.com

Beka Finance is a Spanish financial services company, created in 1989 as a subsidiary of Caja Madrid (which subsequently became Bankia). Beka Finance specializes in providing and developing financial products and services, asset management, financial advisory, investment banking and direct investment.

== Background and transactions ==
In 2013, the company was acquired by the Catalan investor group GVC Gaesco, which subsequently sold the company to Gala Capital in 2020.

The firm is primarily owned by its management team. The chairman is investment banker and entrepreneur Carlos Tejera, formerly a consultant at McKinsey & Company and chairman of Gala Capital. Carlos Stilianopoulos, CEO of Beka Finance, was previously president of Wholesale Banking and CFO at Bankia.

Since 2020, Beka Finance has undertaken a series of international financial transactions. In 2020, bought the Portuguese loan securitization company Sagres, which had over €6.5bn under management and was previously owned by Citigroup. That year, Beka also raised €60m for its social impact fund Cuanimen.

In 2021, launched the €300m Beka & Bolschare Iberian Agribusiness Fund to invest in sustainable agriculture; it also created Beka Credit, a new €2.3bn lending platform.

In 2022, Beka acquired the securitization fund manager Haya Titulización from US fund Cerberus, with €23.2bn worth of assets under management, and agreed to buy Trea, an independent asset management firm in Spain with over €6bn under management.

The firm has invested in several FinTechs: Rebellion Pay, a payment service provider, and Hey Trade, an online broker. The company is also a large financial investor of Spanish musicals producer, SOM Produce, founded by musical producer José Maria Cámara, and of Secuoya Grupo de Comunicación, which manages audio-visual production for Netflix in Spain.

== Controversies ==
In 2014, FCC suspended a liquidity contract with Beka Finance, coinciding with the announcement that investor George Soros was taking a stake in FCC. Some media outlets have also reported that George Soros used Gala Capital, a significant shareholder in Beka Finance, as an investment vehicle to participate in the Spanish market.

In April 2021, Beka hired most of the M&A team from BNP Paribas to launch its own M&A division.

In 2021, Beka appointed former Spanish Agriculture Minister and European Commissioner for Energy and Climate Action Miguel Arias Cañete to its Board. To accept the role, Arias Cañete was required to request approval under Article 11 of the Code of Conduct for members of the European Commission.
