= Pajares de Adaja =

- municipality
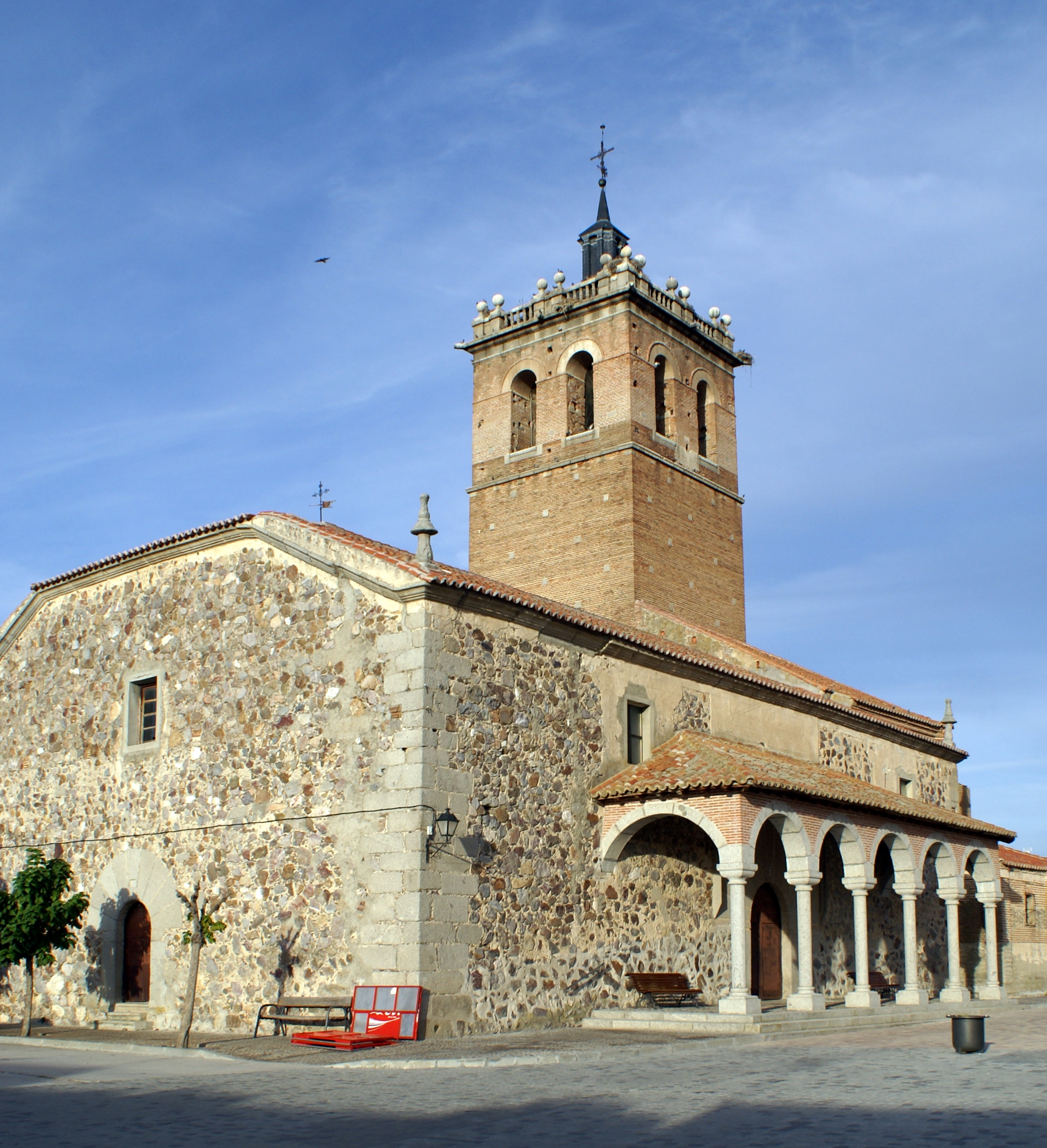
- Church of San Juan Bautista

- Flag Coat of arms

- Location in Spain. Pajares de Adaja (Spain)
- Coordinates: 40°55′25″N 4°38′26″W
- Country: Spain
- Autonomous community: Castile and León
- Province: Ávila
- Municipality: Pajares de Adaja

Government
  - Alcalde: Jesús Caro Adanero (PSOE)

Area
  - Total: 23 km^{2} (8.9 sq mi)

Population (2025-01-01)
  - Total: 123
  - Density: 5.3/km^{2} (14/sq mi)
- Time zone: UTC+1 (CET)
  - Summer (DST): UTC+2 (CEST)
- Website: Official website

Pajares de Adaja is a municipality located in the province of Ávila, Castile and León, Spain.

== Population ==
Historical population
Year	Pop.	±% p.a.
2023	135	—
2024	127	−5.93%
2025	123	−3.15%
Source: INE

== Notable people from Pajares de Adaja ==
- Ángel Acebes
- Francisco Méndez Ávaro
