= Miguel Arias Cañete =

Spanish politician (born 1950)

The Most Excellent Miguel Arias Cañete
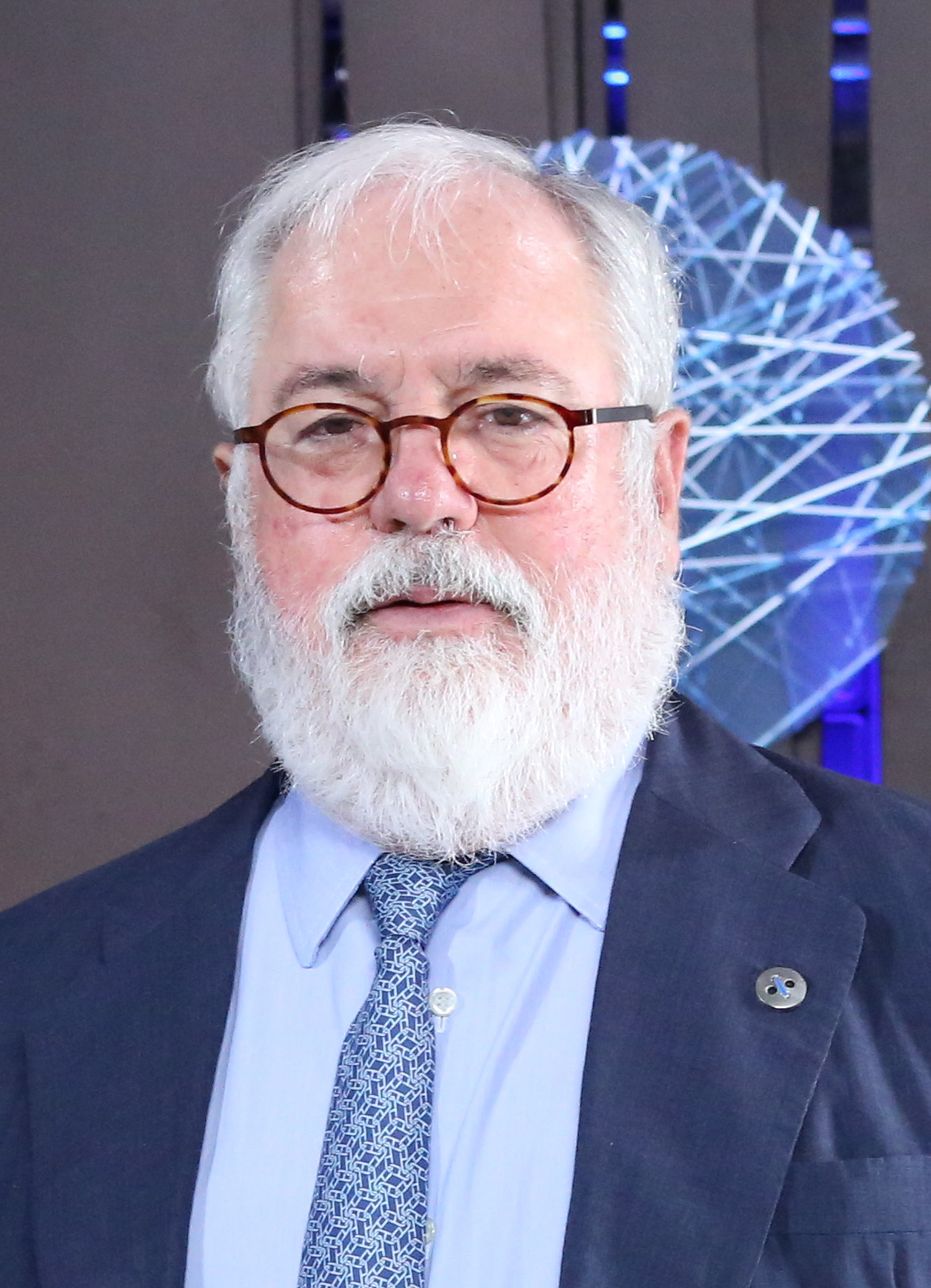
- Arias Cañete in 2017

European Commissioner for Climate Action
- In office 1 November 2014 – 30 November 2019
- Commission: Juncker
- Preceded by: Connie Hedegaard
- Succeeded by: Frans Timmermans

European Commissioner for Energy
- In office 1 November 2014 – 30 November 2019
- Commission: Juncker
- Preceded by: Günther Oettinger
- Succeeded by: Kadri Simson

Minister of Agriculture of Spain (Note: Minister of Agriculture, Fisheries and Food from 2000 to 2004 and Minister of Agriculture, Food and Environment from 2011 to 2014.)
- In office 22 December 2011 – 28 April 2014
- Prime Minister: Mariano Rajoy
- Preceded by: Rosa Aguilar
- Succeeded by: Isabel Garcia Tejerina
- In office 28 April 2000 – 18 April 2004
- Prime Minister: José María Aznar
- Preceded by: Jesús Posada
- Succeeded by: Elena Espinosa

Member of the European Parliament
- In office 1 July 2014 – 31 October 2014
- Constituency: Spain
- In office 1 January 1986 – 19 July 1999
- Constituency: Spain

Personal details
- Born: 24 February 1950 (age 76) Madrid, Spain
- Party: People's Party; People's Alliance
- Spouse(s): Micaela Domecq y Solís- Beaumont
- Children: 4
- Education: Complutense University

Miguel Arias Cañete (born 24 February 1950) is a Spanish politician who served as European Commissioner for Energy and Climate Action in the Juncker Commission from 2014 to 2019.

A member of the Spanish People's Party, Arias served as Minister for Agriculture, Food and Environment in the Government of Spain from 2011 until 2014, before being selected to head his Party List in the European Parliamentary elections.

== Early life and education ==
Arias Cañete was born to judge don Alfonso Arias de la Cuesta, and educated in Madrid, first at the Jesuit School at Chamartín before reading Law at the Universidad Complutense.

== Career ==
After graduating in 1974, he joined the Spanish Civil Service joining the State Lawyers Corps. His first position was in the Spanish Tax Agency at Jerez de la Frontera, before transferring to the Cádiz office. In 1978 he resigned as a civil servant to become a Professor of Law at the University of Cádiz, where he remained until 1982.

Arias entered politics with the People's Alliance (AP) in 1982, serving as a member of the Parliament of Andalusia from 1982 to 1986, representing Cádiz. Arias Cañete joined the AP's national executive board during the presidency of Antonio Hernández Mancha. Once Spain joined the European Economic Community on 1 January 1986, he became a member of the European Parliament as delegate appointed by the Cortes Generales, and later, when the first election to the European Parliament took place in Spain in 1987, he was elected MEP. He served until 1999, chairing the Agricultural and Regional Politics Committees. From 1993 until 2000 he served the Spanish Senate, then was appointed as Minister of Agriculture and Fishing by Prime Minister José María Aznar.

Arias Cañete unsuccessfully bid for the Mayorship of Jerez de la Frontera vis-à-vis the 1995 and 1999 local elections, serving as municipal councillor in the opposition from 1995 to 2000. He was then elected Senator representing Cádiz in the Spanish Senate (2000–2004), and from 2004 to 2008 Deputy for Cádiz in the Spanish Congress. During the same period, he ascended inside the People's Party to "Economic Secretary" and president of its Electoral Committee. In 2008, he was elected Representative for Madrid in the Spanish Congress and Member of the European Parliament for Electoral District Madrid, which he represented until 2014.

=== Minister of Agriculture, Food and Environment, 2011–2014 ===
In 2011 Mariano Rajoy appointed Arias as Minister of Agriculture, Food and Environment in the Spanish Government. He had already served as agriculture minister from 200–2004, but the environment was a new brief for him as it was previously dealt with by a separate ministry.

During his time in office, Arias managed to get parliamentary approval of a 2013 law allowing some construction to take place closer to the coast than previously allowed, raising alarm among ecologists and opposition parties, who argued the change could further blight the Mediterranean shoreline.

=== European Commissioner for Climate Action and Energy, 2014–2019 ===
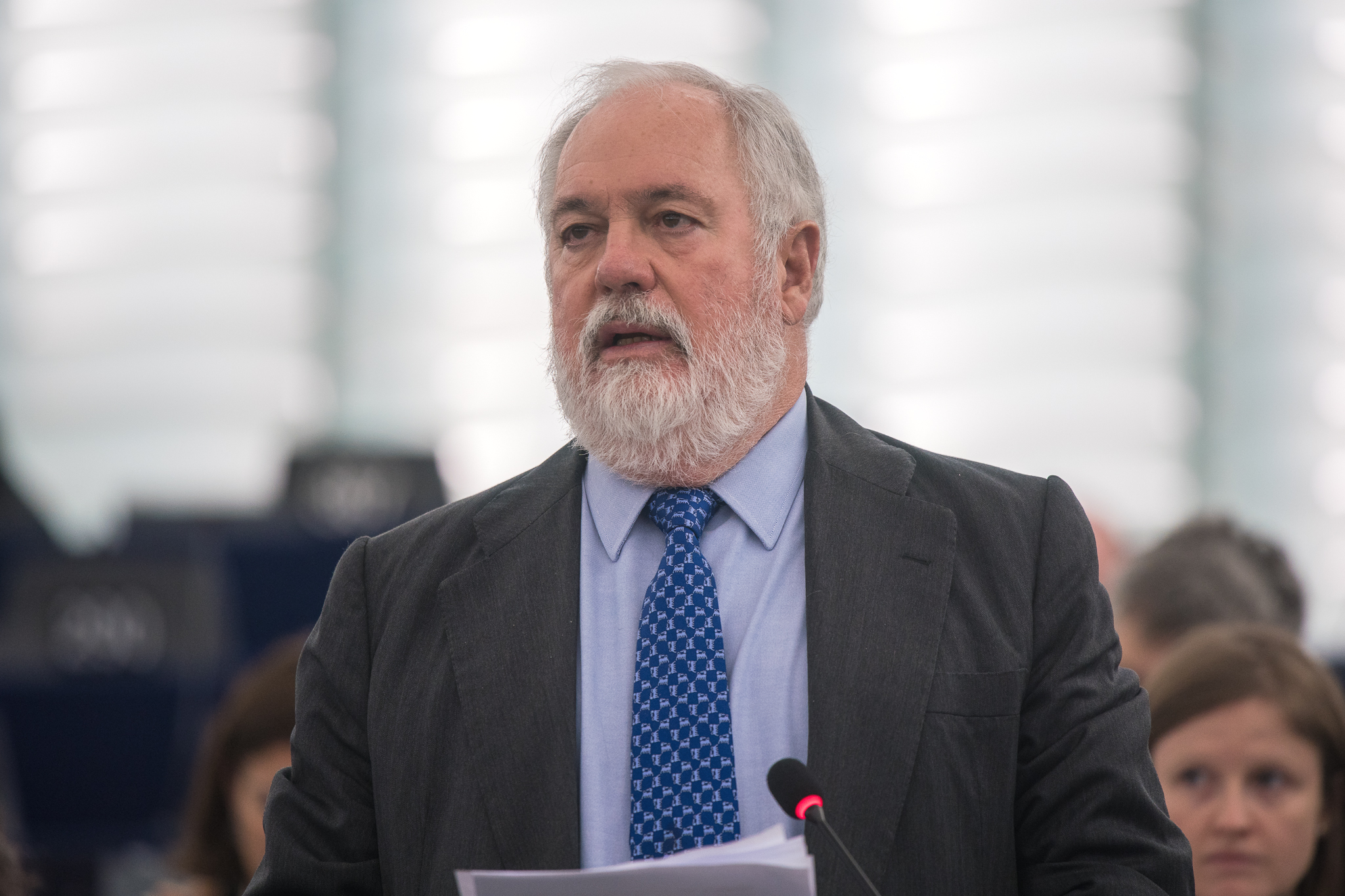
Arias Cañete addressing the European Parliament during a debate on climate change in March 2019

In 2014, Arias was picked by Rajoy to lead the People's Party's list in the 2014 European elections. Following the elections, Spain nominated him for the Juncker Commission in August 2014. By early September, European Commission President Jean-Claude Juncker assigned Arias to the office of European Commissioner for Climate Action and Energy, where he became the first single supervisor of those two policy areas. He took office on 1 November 2014. In this capacity, he works under the guidance of Maroš Šefčovič, the European Commission Vice President for Energy Union.

He represented the European Union at international climate negotiations starting at the 2014 United Nations Climate Change Conference in Lima, followed by COP21 in Paris for the signature of the Paris Agreement. Following the agreement, much of his mandate was spent updating EU climate and energy policy to bring it in line with meeting the EU's commitments under the agreement. Cañete also oversaw the introduction of a number of new climate policies during his mandate, including the Effort Sharing Regulation covering non-ETS emissions, a number of transport initiatives, and a regulation on greenhouse gas emissions and removals from land use, land use change and forestry (LULUCF). The LULUCF regulation marked the first time the commitment on LULUCF was enshrined in EU law (although Member States had undertaken the commitment previously). On climate policy, Arias Cañete has been responsible for the plan to introduce an overhaul of the European Union Emission Trading Scheme, the world's biggest cap-and-trade program.

In summer 2015, Arias Cañete launched a plan to turn the Mediterranean region into "a major gas marketplace" as part of European Union efforts to reduce dependency on dominant oil and gas supplier Russia. Shortly after, he brokered an agreement between France, Spain and Portugal on the MidCat gas pipeline intended to increase exports of Algerian gas into the European energy mix.

The Minister of Energy of the Republic of Turkey, Berat Albayrak, met with the European Union Commissioner for Energy and Climate, Miguel Arias Canete, at the "Second Meeting of the Turkey-EU High Level Energy Dialogue" in 2016.

In his statement during the meeting, Berat Albayrak said; We have restarted the process for the opening of the Energy Chapter with the European Union. He said that the issue of opening this chapter will be transferred from the European Commission to the European Council in a few months and that he hopes to gain momentum as before within the framework of EU membership negotiations with the opening of the 15th Energy Chapter after it is passed by the Council.

Minister Albayrak also invited Canete to the World Energy Congress to be held in Istanbul on 9–13 October 2016.

== Later career ==
In June 2019, Arias Cañete announced his will to put an end to his political career once his mandate as commissioner expired on 1 November 2019, vowing to retire to his home in Jerez de la Frontera and to take care of his grandchildren.

Other activities include:

- Gulbenkian Prize for Humanity, Member of the Jury
- Balam Agriculture, Independent Member of the board of directors (since 2021)
- Beka Finance, member of the Board since 2021

== Controversies ==
Arias has faced accusations of conflicts of interests regarding his business interests and his political posts. While serving as a member of the European Parliament’s Committee on Agriculture and Rural Development, he allegedly held interests in several agricultural businesses, leading the Spanish newspaper El País to describe him in 2014 as always being on the edge of a conflict of interest. In 2014, the environmental group Friends of the Earth and anticorruption group Corporate Europe Observatory criticised his nomination to the Climate Action and Energy portfolio due to his family's involvement in the oil industry.

Furthermore, Arias was called to give evidence before the Provincial Court of Barcelona over a friend's alleged laundering of 2 billion pesetas.

Arias was accused of sexism after Arias and his Socialist rival Elena Valenciano were featured in Spanish television's first live debate between the country's leading candidates for a European Parliament election in May 2014, Valenciano was widely perceived to have beaten him in the debate. Asked to explain his poor performance in the debate, he pointed to the fact that he was facing a woman: "If you abuse your intellectual superiority, you come across like a macho who is pushing a defenceless woman into a corner".

In September 2014, Arias sold two large shareholdings in oil companies Petrolífera Ducar and Petrologis Canarias to appease parliamentarians threatening to reject his confirmation as European Commissioner because of conflicts of interest. Also, his son resigned from their boards. As of October 2014 more than half a million people signed an Avaaz petition calling for Aria's rejection.

The Panama Papers in 2016 revealed that his wife's world-renowned Jandilla bull operations, managed by their two sons, Pablo and Juan Pedro, and co-owned by her siblings, received well over $1 million in farm subsidies and her other farm, forestry and winery businesses also received EU subsidies.

Panamanian Rinconada Investments Group SA was an offshore investment company registered in 2005, listed as inactive in January 2010, which Deutsche Bank Geneva, Swiss-based financial services company Gestrust SA and Mossack Fonseca helped to create. Arias' wife and the Domecq family are politically exposed persons and were empowered to approve transactions.

== Personal life ==
Arias, from a Spanish gentry family, is married to Micaela Domecq y Solís-Beaumont by whom he has four children. His wife's aristocratic family has long been established in the Jerez de la Frontera region of Andalusia, where they own large farming and livestock estates including the breeding of fighting bulls and have given their name to a world-famous brand of fortified wines.

== Recognition ==
- Grand Cross of the Order of Charles III (2004)
- Grand Cross of the Order of Civil Merit (2011)
- Chevalier, Ordre du Mérite agricole
- Knight, Sovereign Military Order of Malta

== Notes ==
Political offices
Preceded by Jesús Posada	Minister of Agriculture, Fishing and Food; 2000–2004	Succeeded by Elena Espinosa
Preceded by Rosa Aguilar	Minister of Agriculture, Food and the Environment; 2011–2014	Succeeded by Isabel García Tejerina
Preceded by Joaquín Almunia	Spanish European Commissioner; 2014–2019	Succeeded by Josep Borrell
Preceded by Connie Hedegaard	European Commissioner for Climate Action; 2014–2019	Succeeded by Frans Timmermans
Preceded by Günther Oettinger	European Commissioner for Energy; 2014–2019	Succeeded by Kadri Simson
