= José María Michavila =

Spanish lawyer, entrepreneur, professor and politician

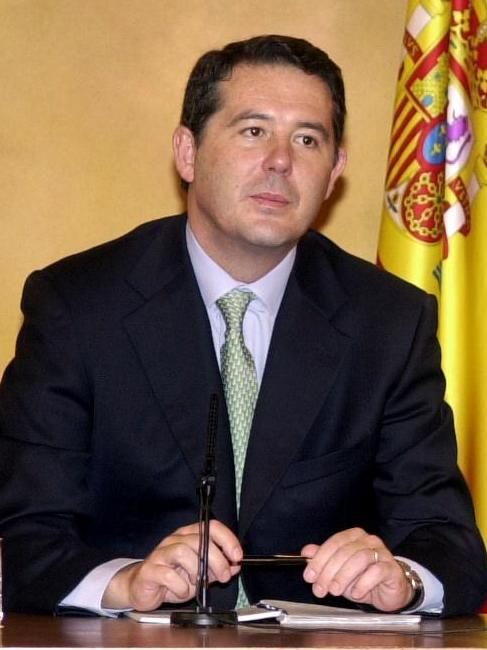
- Michavila in 2003

Minister of Justice
- In office 10 July 2002 – 18 April 2004
- Prime Minister: Jose Maria Aznar; José Luis Rodríguez Zapatero
- Preceded by: Ángel Acebes
- Succeeded by: Juan Fernando López Aguilar

Member of the Congress of Deputies
- In office 2 April 2004 – 3 September 2009
- Constituency: Valencia
- In office 6 June 1993 – 5 April 2000
- Constituency: Madrid

Personal details
- Born: 28 March 1960 (age 66) Madrid
- Spouse: Alejandra de Salinas

José María Michavila Núñez (Madrid, Spain, 28 March 1960) is a Spanish lawyer, entrepreneur, professor and former politician for the People's Party (PP). He is the founding partner of the law firm "MA ABOGADOS" and also of the wealth advisory company "MDF (Michavila de Fernando) Family Partners". He has a degree in Contemporary History as well as a PhD in Law. He was an MP in the Spanish Parliament from 1993 to 2009 and a member of the Government of Spain during the eight years that José María Aznar was Prime Minister (1996- 2004).

== Education ==
Before entering the public eye, he studied two majors in the Complutense University of Madrid. In 1984 he attained a degree in Law summa cum laude, and in 1985 graduated in Contemporary History.

In 1987 he was awarded a doctorate summa cum laude in Administrative-Economic Law after presenting a thesis about the control exercised by the Bank of Spain over the financial system.

He passed public examinations to become full professor of Administrative law at the UComplutense University of Madrid in 1991.

He received four fellowships. The first from the British Council in 1989, then in that same year the Japanese Government also granted him another one. Then in 1993 he received a fellowship from the French Government and in 1994 from the United States.

He carried out postgraduate studies at the universities of Harvard and the London School of Economics (LSE).

== Professional career ==
Aligned to the UCD youth he was a founding member of the “Asociación Liberal 1812” (Liberal Association 1812).

In 1985 he became a professor in Administrative law in Complutense University. From 1988 he practised as a Lawyer for the Council of State in the Economy and Taxation section.

During the time when he was General Secretary he contributed to create the Real Colegio Complutense at Harvard University and the Summer Programs at El Escorial.

In 1992 he contributed with other professionals of the Spanish Financial world the Instituto Estudios Bursátiles (IEB) of which he was its first secretary.

== Political career ==
He entered politics in 1993 when he was elected to the Spanish Congress of Deputies representing Madrid region. Between 1996 and 2000 he served as Secretary of State for Relations with the Cortes. For the 2000 election he switched to Valencia region which he has represented until 3 September 2009. He served as Secretary of State for Justice between 2000 and 2002 when he was promoted to Minister of Justice until 2004 in the government of José María Aznar.

On 6 February 1993, in the People's Party's XI Congress and as a nomination of its president José María Aznar he was elected as secretary of Studies and Programs. In this role he led the creation of the manifestos for the first European elections won by the PP (1994), also the local elections (1995) and the parliamentary elections (1996). Since then until 2004 he was a member of the National Executive Committee.

Along with Ángel Acebes he promoted the anti-terrorist Act and the State Act to reform the justice system.

The Law of Political Parties was created as a result of those agreements. In its Preamble I it says “ The aim is to guarantee the functioning of the democratic system and the essential freedoms of citizens by preventing a political party from repeatedly and seriously undermining this democratic regime of freedoms, justifying racism and xenophobia or politically supporting violence and the activities of terrorist groups”. On 3 September 2002 Michavila brought an action against the Basque party Batasuna that he called “the claim of democracy against terrorism”. That resulted in the party being banned as it was considered the political wing of ETA.

During the time Michavila was Minister of Justice, Spain promoted the creation of a mechanism that allowed countries in the European Union to extradite terrorist suspects quicker, the European Arrest Warrant.

In March 2004, after the Madrid train bombings where 191 people were killed, the PP lost the general election.

== Professional activity ==
After 11 years in politics Michavila returned to his previous professional activities. In 2006 he moved to London with his family.

In 2006 he was appointed Senior Advisor of RBC (Royal Bank of Canada).

From 2010 until 2016 he was Senior Advisor for JP Morgan IF from where he represented the entity at NOATUM Council. During those same years he was a member of the Global Advisor Board of Oliver Wyman.

In June 2008 he founded a Family Office, MdF Family Partners, with the former banker of JP Morgan, Daniel de Fernando. It has branches in Madrid, Barcelona, Mexico City, New York, Miami and London. This entity provides legal counsel to more than 100 families from 11 nationalities.

He then founded a new law firm (November 2009), MA Abogados, which has offices in Madrid, Sevilla, Valencia, Palma de Mallorca, Bilbao, Salamanca, Vigo and Marbella. Dedicated to high level advocacy, both for medium and large national companies with an international vocation.

José María Michavila has also continued his professor activity being a part of the Postgraduate Degree in Contemporary History in the Francisco de Vitoria University in Madrid. He also gives an annual lecture in the Executive Program in Harvard University.

In 2012 he was appointed a member of the Council of State and confirmed in this position by the new government in 2018.

== Philanthropic associations ==
As a member of the Pablo Hortsman Foundation he has done volunteer work with the foundation in Kenya.

In November 2018 he was recognized by the Premios Gredos for his solidarity activity.

He is also a Trustee of the Santa Teresa Foundation, the Euro-América Foundation, the Fundación Silos and the Tierra Santa Foundation.

== Personal life ==
He is the father of three daughters and one son with Irene Vázquez Romero, who died on 22 November 2013. He is married to Alejandra de Salinas, the granddaughter of human rights activist María Asunción Milá.
