= Jesús Posada =

Spanish politician (born 1945)

Jesús Posada Moreno
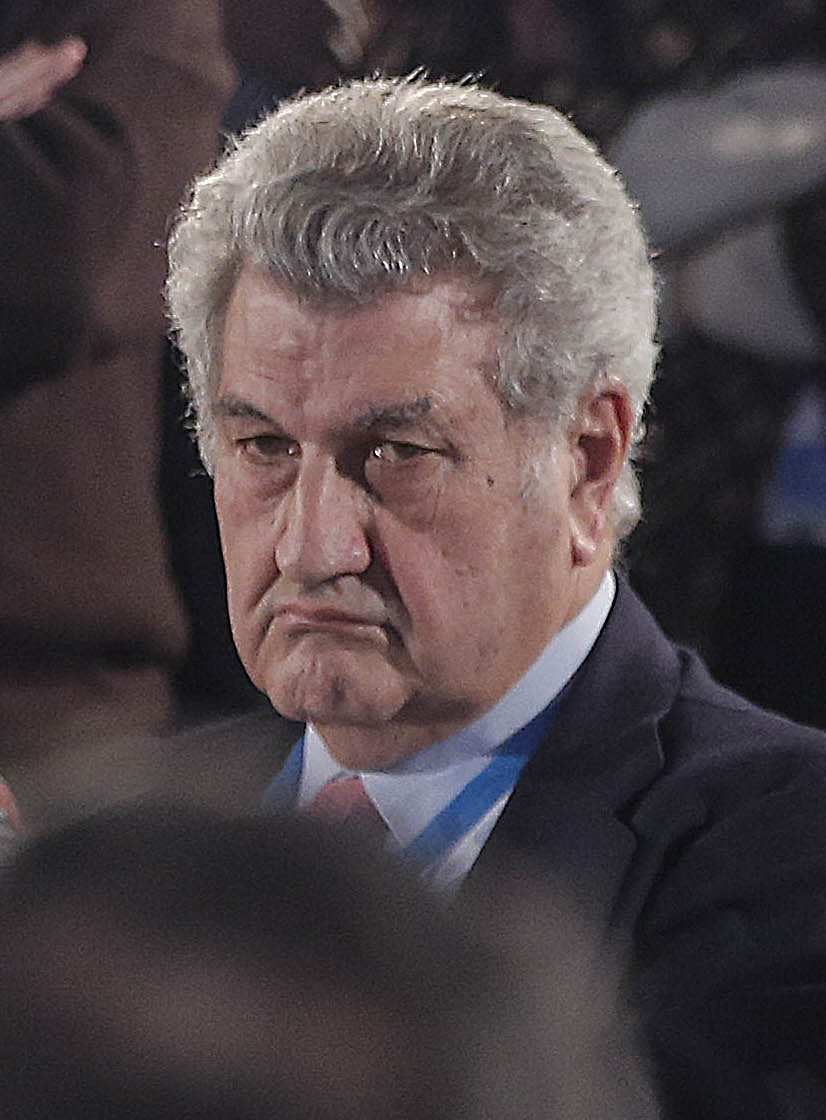

President of the Congress of Deputies
- In office 13 December 2011 – 13 January 2016
- Monarchs: Juan Carlos I Felipe VI
- Preceded by: José Bono Martínez
- Succeeded by: Patxi López

Minister of Public Administrations
- In office 27 April 2000 – 9 July 2002
- Prime Minister: José María Aznar
- Preceded by: Ángel Acebes
- Succeeded by: Javier Arenas

Minister of Agriculture, Fisheries and Food
- In office 29 April 1999 – 12 March 2000
- Prime Minister: José María Aznar
- Preceded by: Loyola de Palacio
- Succeeded by: Miguel Arias

President of Castile and León
- In office 18 September 1989 – 8 July 1991
- Monarch: Juan Carlos I
- Preceded by: José María Aznar
- Succeeded by: Juan José Lucas

Personal details
- Born: 4 April 1945 (age 81) Soria, Spain
- Party: People's Party
- Spouse: María Blanca de la Mata y Pobes
- Education: Technical University of Madrid; Complutense University of Madrid

Jesús Posada Moreno (born 4 April 1945) is the former President of the Congress of Deputies, the lower house of the Spanish Cortes Generales. He has worked as a civil engineer and economist.

From 1979 to 1981 he served as civil governor of the province of Huelva in Andalusia.

He went on to represent Soria in the regional parliament of Castile and Leon from 1983. From 1989 to 1991 he was president of the regional government. He has represented Soria Province in the Congress of Deputies since the election of the fifth legislature on 29 June 1993. He succeeded José Antonio de Miguel Nieto. In the government of José María Aznar, he was Minister of Agriculture, Fisheries and Food from 1999 to 2000, and Minister of Public Administration from 2000 to 2002.

On 13 December 2011 he was elected President of the Congress of Deputies for the tenth legislature, with 202 of a possible 350 votes.

== See also ==
- Académie Belgo-Espagnole d'Histoire

Political offices
Preceded by José María Aznar	President of Castile and León; 1989-1991	Succeeded by Juan José Lucas
Preceded by Ignacia de Loyola de Palacio	Minister of Agriculture, Fisheries and Food; 1999-2000	Succeeded by Miguel Arias
Preceded by Ángel Acebes	Minister of Public Administrations; 2000-2002	Succeeded by Javier Arenas
Preceded by José Bono Martínez	President of the Congress of Deputies; 2011-2016	Succeeded by Patxi López
