= Manuel Pimentel =

Spanish politician and writer

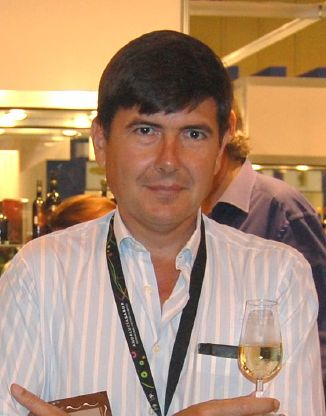

Minister of Labour and Social Affairs
- In office 19 January 1999 – 21 February 2000
- Prime Minister: José María Aznar
- Preceded by: Javier Arenas
- Succeeded by: Juan Carlos Aparicio

Personal details
- Born: Manuel Ramón Pimentel Siles; 30 August 1961 (age 65) Seville, Spain
- Party: People's Party (1990–2003); Andalusian Forum (2003–2006)
- Education: University of Córdoba

Manuel Ramón Pimentel Siles (born 30 August 1961) is a Spanish politician and writer. He served as Minister of Labour and Social Affairs from January 1999 to February 2000. In March 2003, Pimentel abandoned the People's Party (PP) in protest over the Irak War crisis, forming his own party, the Andalusian Forum.
