= Isabel Tocino =

Spanish politician (born 1949)

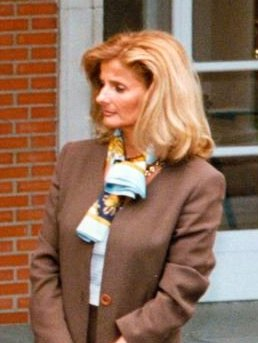
Isabel Tocino Portrait

Isabel Tocino Biscarolasaga (born 9 March 1949 in Santander, Spain) is a Spanish politician.

== Life and career ==
Tocino is a professor at Complutense University of Madrid. She served as Minister of Environment in the government of Prime Minister José María Aznar from 1996 until 2000.

Tocino is a member of Opus Dei.

== Other activities ==
- Banco Pastor, Chairwoman of the Board of Directors (since 2017)
- Amundi, Member of the Global Advisory Board (since 2016)
- Enagás, Independent Member of the Board of Directors (2015–2022)
- ENCE Energía y Celulosa, Independent External Member of the Board of Directors
- Naturhouse Health, Independent Member of the Board of Directors (since 2014)
- Banco Santander, Non-Executive Independent Member of the Board of Directors (2007-2017)
- Climate Change Capital, Non-Executive Member of the Board of Directors (-2015)
- Banif Financial Group, Member of the Board of Directors (2006-2015)
