= Loyola de Palacio =

Spanish politician (1950–2006)

The Most Excellent Loyola de Palacio
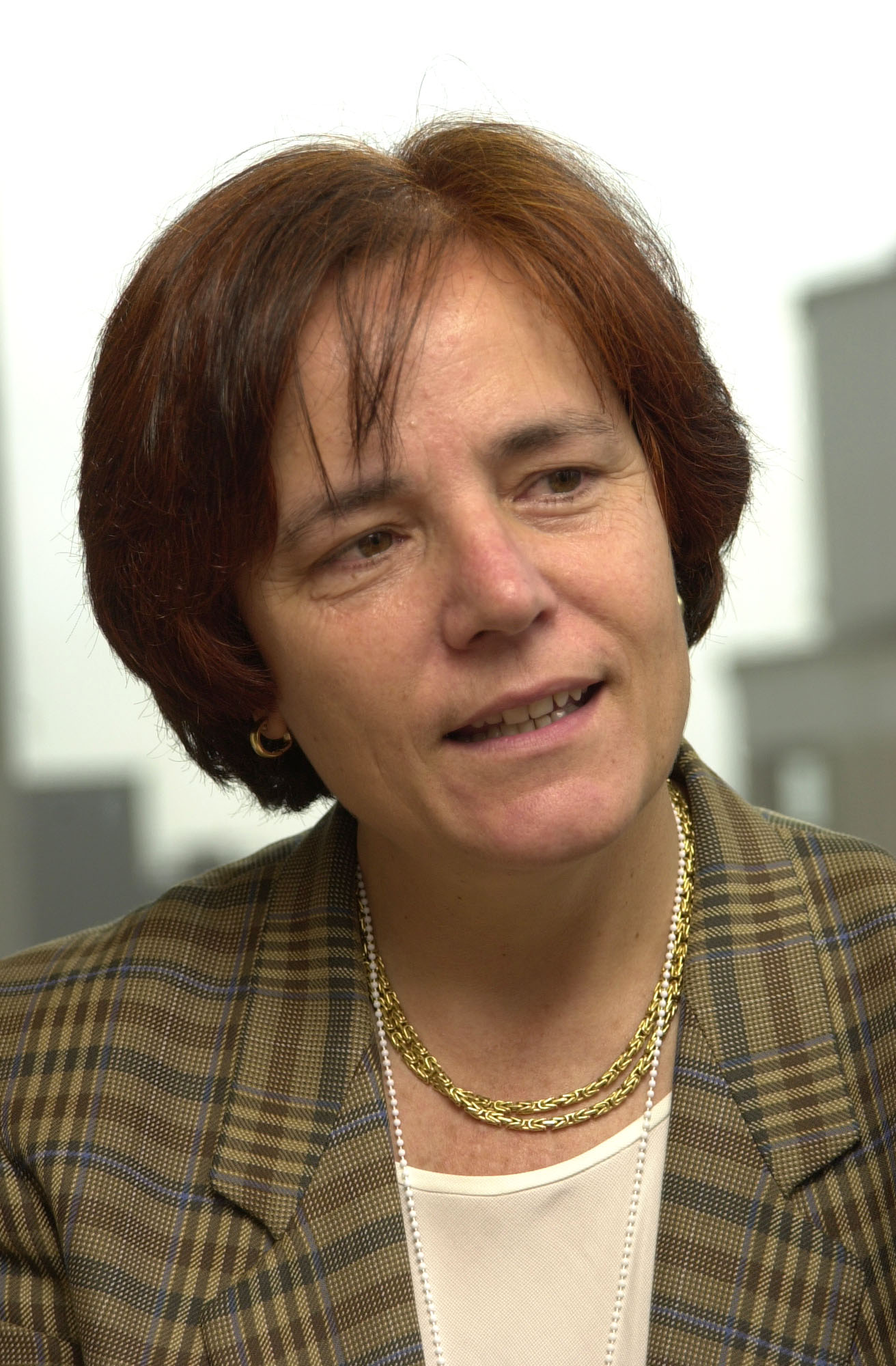
- De Palacio in 2001

Minister of Agriculture and Fisheries
- In office 6 May 1996 – 30 April 1999
- Monarch: H.M. Don Juan Carlos I
- Prime Minister: José María Aznar López
- Preceded by: Luis María Atienza
- Succeeded by: Jesús Posada

Member of the Senate
- In office 22 June 1986 – 28 October 1989
- Constituency: Segovia

Member of the Congress of Deputies
- In office 28 October 1989 – 17 July 1999
- Constituency: Segovia

Vice-President of the European Commission European Commissioner for Parliamentary Relations, Transport and Energy
- In office 16 September 1999 – 21 November 2004
- President: Romano Prodi
- Preceded by: Erkki Liikanen (Parliamentary Relations); Neil Kinnock (Transport); Christos Papoutsis (Energy)
- Succeeded by: Siim Kallas (Parliamentary Relations); Jacques Barrot (Transport); Andris Piebalgs (Energy)

Personal details
- Born: Ignacia de Loyola de Palacio y del Valle Lersundi; 16 September 1950 Madrid, Spain
- Died: 13 December 2006 (aged 56) Madrid, Spain
- Party: People's Party

Ignacia de Loyola de Palacio y del Valle Lersundi (16 September 1950 – 13 December 2006) was a Spanish politician. She was among the first women to rise to political prominence in Spain during the early years of reconstituted democracy. She was a minister in the Spanish government from 1996 to 1998 (Ministry of Agriculture, Fisheries and Food), and a member of the European Commission from 1999 to 2004.

== Early life and education ==
De Palacio was born in Madrid, into an aristocratic Basque family, the eldest of four sisters and three brothers, the children of Luis María de Palacio y de Palacio, 4th Marqués de Matonte, and his wife Luisa Mariana del Valle Lersundi y del Valle; the family held also the title of marquis of Guaimaro (a place in Cuba, also an Italian surname). Her mother Luisa died of lung cancer when Loyola was 22, and she took charge of the family. She was educated at the Lycée Français in Madrid, and studied law at Complutense University, and also Communications Engineering, a field in which Luis Maria de Palacio, Sr., was a top expert.

== Political career ==
In 1976, Palacio was a founder member of the moderate-wing Alianza Popular (later transformed into the Partido Popular) led initially by Manuel Fraga Iribarne, and she became the first leader of its youth section, Nuevas Generaciones. Her politics were on the "soft", liberal wing of her party. She was elected to represent Segovia in the upper house of the Spanish Parliament (the Senado) in the June 1986 Spanish general election. She joined the national executive of the Partido Popular in 1989, and was elected as a deputy for Segovia in the lower house (the Congreso de los Diputados) in the October 1989 Spanish general election, remaining in the lower house until 1999. She served as minister of Agriculture, Fisheries and Food in José María Aznar's Partido Popular government that accessed to power after the 1996 Spanish general election.

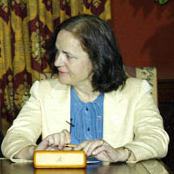
Loyola de Palacio in 2004

Palacio headed the Partido Popular's list in the June 1999 European elections, and was duly elected to the European Parliament. She also joined the European Commission on 13 September 1999, as commissioner for energy and transport, in the Prodi Commission. She also served as vice-president (jointly with Neil Kinnock), and took charge of relations with the European Parliament. She pushed forward the Galileo positioning system, and new maritime safety regulations following the Prestige oil spill off the coast of Galicia in November 2002.

== Life after politics ==
After leaving the commission on 21 November 2004, Palacio became a director at the banks BNP Paribas and Rothschild Bank, and at the pharmaceutical company Zeltia.

== Personal life ==
Her sister is Ana Palacio.

Palacio was a devout Roman Catholic but denied being connected with the Opus Dei group, remarking that even her name (after that of the founder of the Jesuits, Ignatius Loyola) would make that laughable. She enjoyed sports, including mountaineering but she preferred diving and windsurfing.

Palacio was diagnosed with Stage IV cancer in 2006, and was treated in Houston and Madrid for five months. She died in Madrid, at the public health services' Hospital Universitario 12 de Octubre. Following her death a state memorial service was organised, in which all parties, including the left-wing coalition United Left (Formed by Communist party, Humanist party, and others) and PP critics, united to remember her policies to improve EU regulations.

Since 2008, the European Commission has created a European Policy Chair named "Loyola de Palacio" at the Robert Schuman Centre for Advanced Studies in the European University Institute in Italy.
