= Julia García-Valdecasas =

Spanish politician (1944–2009)

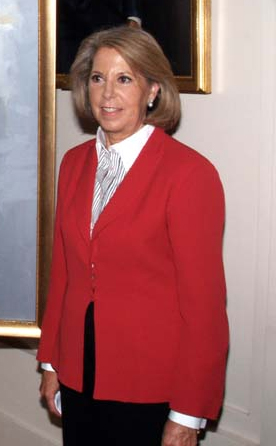
- in 2005
- Born: January 29, 1944; Barcelona, Spain
- Died: February 5, 2009 (aged 65); Barcelona, Spain
- Political party: Popular Party

Julia García-Valdecasas (January 29, 1944 – February 5, 2009) was a Spanish Minister of Public Administration from 2003 to 2004.

== Life ==
García-Valdecasas was born in Barcelona in 1944 to Francisco García-Valdecasas who was a physician and rector of the University of Barcelona between 1965 and 1968 (a period with many students demonstrations). García-Valdecasas graduated at the University of Barcelona in Pharmacy in 1967 and ran her own business for ten years.

In 1980 she graduated as an auditor and intervened successfully in Catalonia. She was president of the National Association of Auditors from 1990 to 1994. She represented Barcelona Province in the Spanish Congress of Deputies from 2000 until 2006.

She married Xavier Añoveros Trias de Bes and they had three children.

She was appointed representative of the Central Government in Catalonia from 1996 to 2003 (first female in the position).

She was appointed the first female Minister of Public Administration from 2003 to 2004 by José María Aznar. She resigned from all positions in 2006 due to multiple system atrophy and died in Barcelona in 2009.
