= Juan Carlos Aparicio =

Spanish politician (born 1955)

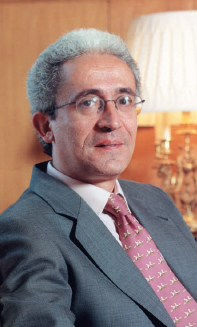

Minister of Labour and Social Affairs
- In office 21 February 2000 – 10 July 2002
- Prime Minister: José María Aznar
- Preceded by: Manuel Pimentel
- Succeeded by: Eduardo Zaplana

Personal details
- Born: Juan Carlos Aparicio Pérez; 20 April 1955 (age 71) Burgos, Spain
- Party: People's Party
- Education: University of Valladolid

Juan Carlos Aparicio Pérez (born 20 April 1955) is a Spanish politician and chemist. A member of the People's Party, he served as Minister of Labour and Social Affairs of Spain from February 2000 to July 2002. Prior to this, he was Secretary of State for Social Security from 1996 to 2000, and Vice President of the Junta of Castile and León in 1989. He also served at the local level as Mayor of Burgos between 2003 and 2011.

In his legislative career, he was a member of the Congress of Deputies representing Burgos for three non-consecutive periods, as well as a Senator and a regional procurator in the Cortes of Castile and León.

Following his retirement from active politics, he joined the board of directors of Indra Sistemas on behalf of the SEPI in 2013, and was appointed as an elective councillor of the Council of State in 2023.

He has been awarded several decorations, including the Grand Cross of the Order of Charles III, the Grand Cross of the Order of Civil Merit, and the Grand Cross of the Order of Isabella the Catholic.
