= Jaime Mayor Oreja =

Spanish politician (born 1951)

Jaime Mayor Oreja MP MEP
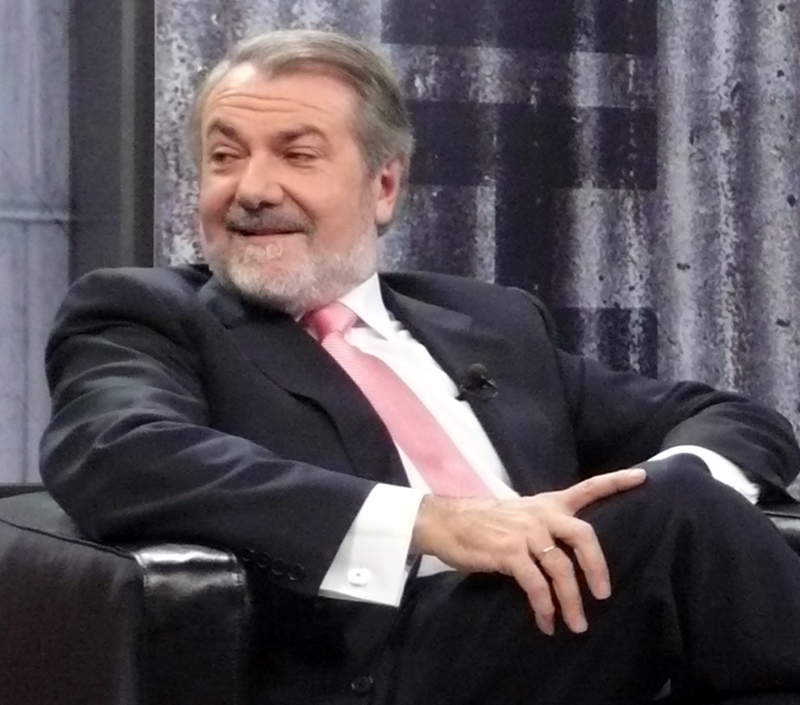

Minister of the Interior
- In office 4 May 1996 – 27 February 2001
- Prime Minister: José María Aznar
- Preceded by: Juan Alberto Belloch
- Succeeded by: Mariano Rajoy

Member of the European Parliament
- In office 13 June 2004 – 25 May 2014
- Constituency: Spain

Member of the Congress of Deputies
- In office 3 March 1996 – 24 April 2001
- Constituency: Alava
- In office 1 April 1979 – 28 October 1982
- Constituency: Gipuzkoa

Member of the Basque Parliament
- In office 8 June 2001 – 2 July 2004
- Constituency: Biscay
- In office 18 December 1990 – 29 March 1996
- Constituency: Álava
- In office 22 March 1984 – 1 October 1986
- Constituency: Gipuzkoa

Personal details
- Born: 12 July 1951 (age 74) San Sebastián, Basque Country, Spain
- Party: People's Party (1989–present)
- Other political affiliations: Union of the Democratic Centre (1977–1983); People's Coalition (1983–1986)

Jaime Mayor Oreja (born 12 July 1951) is a former Spanish conservative politician of the People's Party. He served as member of the Basque Parliament, of the Spanish Parliament, and of the European Parliament, as well as being Spanish Minister of the Interior between 1996 and 2000. He is known for his outspoken anti-ETA rhetoric and social ultracatholicism

== Biography ==
=== Early life ===
Mayor Oreja was born and raised in San Sebastián, in the Spanish Basque Country, where he attended a school run by Marianists. He earned an agricultural engineering degree and briefly studied law before dropping out to enter politics.

Mayor Oreja's family is deeply rooted in conservative Spanish politics. His grandfather Marcelino Oreja Elósegui, a Catholic activist and Carlist politician, was a victim of the Asturian strike action of 1934, and his uncle Marcelino Oreja Aguirre served extensively in the Spanish civil service and in the European Parliament. It was Marcelino Oreja who introduced his nephew to politics.

=== Early career ===
Oreja joined the Union of the Democratic Centre (UCD) in 1977. After failing to be elected in the first democratic elections to the Cortes Generales since Francisco Franco's death, he won a seat with the UCD in the 1979 elections. Shortly after the elections, he was appointed delegate of the Spanish government to the Basque Government. He was also involved in the drafting of the Basque Statute of Autonomy, serving in the Basque General Council, precursor to the autonomous parliament as a minister for tourism. He left the Cortes Generales in 1982 as the Socialist Party won a majority. He kept his position as delegate of the Spanish government to the Basque Government until 1983, when the UCD began to collapse. He joined the People's Coalition, and stood as their candidate for lehendakari in the 1984 Basque elections. Disagreements within the governing party, the Basque Nationalist Party, a snap election was called in 1986. Mayor Oreja then retired from politics.

=== Return to Politics ===
In 1989, at the request of Manuel Fraga, Mayor Oreja returned to politics to help the newly founded People's Party (PP). He was the party's candidate in the Basque elections of 1990, and managed the European Parliament elections of 1989, where the party made no significant gains or losses. In 1994, the party nearly doubled its seats.

=== Ministerial career ===
After José María Aznar's win in the 1996 Spanish Parliamentary Elections, Mayor Oreja was appointed Minister of the Interior. Upon entering government, he had to deal with the ETA's kidnapping of José Antonio Ortega Lara. In 1998, ETA declared a ceasefire. Mayor Oreja took a hawkish stance, denouncing the ceasefire as false truce. He famously coined the term "tregua-trampa", or "trap truce", and he publicly stated his refusal to engage in any political negotiation with ETA. His hard stance against ETA's terrorism earned him over much praise amongst Spanish conservatives.

=== 2001 Basque candidacy ===
His tenure as Minister of the Interior marked Mayor Oreja's height of influence, and thereafter his political career experienced an irregular decline. In 2001, his party chose him as candidate to the Basque regional presidency in that year's election, so he resigned as Minister of the Interior to focus on running the campaign.

The 2001 Basque elections took place in the aftermath of the collapse of ETA's 1998 ceasefire. Mayor Oreja ran on an aggressive ticket, defending the Spanish Constitution and the Statute of Gernika as the main framework to defeat ETA, and vigorously attacked the incumbent Basque Nationalist Party because Mayor Oreja alleged they were complicit with terrorism. Although his ticket never polled high enough to secure a plurality of seats in the Basque parliament, Mayor Oreja and the Spanish Socialist Party made it clear that were the incumbent lehendakari Juan José Ibarretxe to fail to secure an absolute majority in the Basque parliament, Mayor Oreja would form a minority government instead with the Socialist's support. Albeit Mayor Oreja improved his party's results and attained 22.9% of the votes, this proved insufficient to unseat Ibarretxe, who obtained 42.4% of the votes with a 6.2% swing in his favour. As a result, Mayor Oreja failed to become lehendakari, and Ibarretxe was re-elected.

He remained leader of the opposition in the Basque country until 2004. During this time, he developed a reputation as an absentee parliamentarian, particularly after missing a key vote in 2002 that enabled the Ibarretxe government to pass its budget by just one vote (Mayor Oreja's).

=== Conservative leadership hopeful and MEP ===
In 2004 he was mentioned as a potential successor to the outgoing Spanish prime minister José María Aznar, but the latter finally opted for Mariano Rajoy instead. Shortly afterwards, Mayor Oreja quit his seat in the Basque parliament and ran for MEP in that year's European parliament elections, where he secured a seat. For the next ten years, he occupied several senior positions in the European People's Party group of the European Parliament, but was largely inactive in the Spanish political landscape.

=== Later career ===
His position against abortion and LGBT rights, and his hard-line stance against terrorism, placed him at the far right of his party. After a series of public spats with his party's leadership over their strategy in the final days of ETA, Mayor Oreja decided not to run again for the European Parliament in the 2014 election, and largely abandoned public life. Since then, he has chaired the Fundación Valores y Sociedad, an ultraconservative lobby devoted to extending ultra-catholic ideas throughout the Spanish-speaking world. He has since publicly engaged with the defence of what he deems as "traditional" values, including positions against gender studies, women's rights, and LGBTQ rights. He has denounced what he deems as the moral decadence of modern society, and claimed that abortion is something "worthy of bolcheviques", and deployed intense lobbying activity defending these stances in Latin America.
