= Javier Arenas (politician) =

Spanish politician (born 1957)

Second Deputy Prime Minister of Spain
- In office 3 September 2003 – 18 April 2004
- Monarch: Juan Carlos I
- Prime Minister: José María Aznar
- Preceded by: Rodrigo Rato
- Succeeded by: Pedro Solbes

Minister of the Presidency
- In office 3 September 2003 – 18 April 2004
- Monarch: Juan Carlos I
- Prime Minister: José María Aznar
- Preceded by: Mariano Rajoy
- Succeeded by: María Teresa Fernández de la Vega

Minister of Public Administrations
- In office 10 July 2002 – 3 September 2003
- Monarch: Juan Carlos I
- Prime Minister: José María Aznar
- Preceded by: Jesús Posada
- Succeeded by: Julia García-Valdecasas

Minister of Labour and Social Affairs
- In office 5 May 1996 – 18 January 1999
- Monarch: Juan Carlos I
- Prime Minister: José María Aznar
- Preceded by: José Antonio Griñán (as Minister of Labour and Social Security); Cristina Alberdi (as Minister of Social Affairs)
- Succeeded by: Manuel Pimentel

President of the People's Party of Andalusia
- In office 1 April 2004 – 14 July 2012
- Preceded by: Teófila Martínez
- Succeeded by: Juan Ignacio Zoido

Secretary General of the People's Party
- In office 30 January 1999 – 4 September 2003
- Leader: José María Aznar
- Preceded by: Francisco Álvarez-Cascos
- Succeeded by: Mariano Rajoy

Member of the Congress of Deputies
- In office 27 March 2000 – 1 April 2008
- Constituency: Seville

Senator
- Incumbent
- Assumed office 9 April 2008
- Appointed by: Parliament of Andalusia

Deputy of the Parliament of Andalusia
- In office 30 March 2008 – 30 December 2015
- Constituency: Almería

Councillor of Seville City Council
- In office 7 May 1983 – 10 June 1987

Personal details
- Born: 28 December 1957 (age 68) Seville, Spain

Javier Arenas Bocanegra (born 28 December 1957) is a Spanish politician.

== Political career ==
He joined the Union of the Democratic Centre in the early 1980s and was President of Juventudes Centristas (Centrist Youth), the UCD youth organization. He was Deputy Mayor of Seville between 1983 and 1987 and was a member of the Parliament of Andalusia from 1986 until 1989 in which he served as Deputy Chair of the Justice and Government Committee. He served as a member of the Congress of Deputies from 1989 to 1994 and from 2000 to 2008 as deputy for Seville and represented the same province in the Spanish Senate from 1994 to 2000. He was Deputy Secretary-General of the People's Party (PP) between 1991 and 1993.

Between July 1993 and 1999, he was President of the PP in Andalusia (Spanish: Partido Popular, PP) and resumed the role in 2004. He was Employment Minister between 1996 and 1999, Secretary-General of the People's Party between 1999 and 2003 and Minister of Public Administration between 2002 and 2003. During his spell as Second Deputy Prime Minister and Minister of the Presidency between September 2003 and April 2004 one of the major pieces of legislation that he was responsible for was the Pact for Liberties and Anti-Terrorism in 2000, a bipartisan agreement between the PP and Spanish Socialist Workers' Party (PSOE), signed by both President José María Aznar and the then Leader of the Opposition Zapatero.

At the present time, he is spokesman for the Popular group in the Andalusian Parliament and Senator representing the Autonomous Community of Andalusia. He is known to be a leading moderate member of the party and associated with the Christian-Democratic sector of the Party. He was the President of the National Electoral Committee of the PP in 2008.

== See also ==
- Bárcenas affair
