= Ángel Acebes =

Spanish politician (born 1958)

Ángel Acebes Paniagua
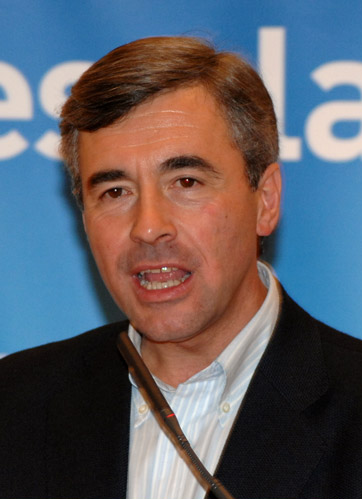

Minister of the Interior
- In office 10 July 2002 – 18 April 2004
- Prime Minister: Jose Maria Aznar; José Luis Rodríguez Zapatero
- Preceded by: Mariano Rajoy
- Succeeded by: José Antonio Alonso

Minister of Justice
- In office 27 April 2000 – 10 July 2002
- Prime Minister: Jose Maria Aznar
- Preceded by: Margarita Mariscal de Gante
- Succeeded by: José María Michavila

Member of the Congress of Deputies
- In office 3 March 1996 – 14 June 2011
- Constituency: Ávila

Senator
- In office 6 June 1993 – 3 March 1996
- Preceded by: Mariano Rajoy
- Succeeded by: Juan Antonio Alonso
- Constituency: Ávila

Mayor of Ávila
- In office 6 July 1991 – 16 June 1995
- Preceded by: Mario Galán
- Succeeded by: Dolores Ruiz Ayúcar

Personal details
- Born: Ángel Acebes Paniagua; 3 July 1958 (age 68) Pajares de Adaja, Castile and León, Spain
- Party: People's Party
- Occupation: Politician

Ángel Acebes Paniagua (born 3 July 1958) is a Spanish politician.

== Early life and education ==
Acebes holds a degree in law from the University of Salamanca.

== Political career ==
Acebes was a member of parliament for the right-wing People's Party from 1996 to 2011, representing Avila. He played a key role in securing the support of minority parties and so making it possible for the People's Party to form a government.

Acebes served as Minister of Justice from 1999 to 2002 and Interior Minister from 2002 to 2004. He was Interior Minister responsible for national security and Police when the Madrid bombings occurred and was criticised by his opponents for blaming the attacks on ETA, allegedly for electoral gain, rather than on Islamic militants.

== Life after politics ==
In 2012, Spain's high court accepted a case brought by UPyD against Acebes and several executives at Bankia and its parent BFA, which will seek to examine whether its accounts were misrepresented and investors misled about the lender's 2011 stock market listing. In October 2014, he had to appear in the High Court over allegations the PP ran a slush fund.

== Other activities ==
- Iberdrola, Independent Member of the Board of Directors (since 2020)
