= Cristina Narbona =

Spanish politician

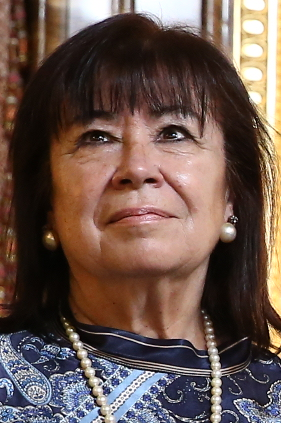
- Narbona in 2019

First Vice President of the Senate
- In office 21 May 2019 – 17 August 2023
- President: Manuel Cruz Rodríguez; Pilar Llop
- Preceded by: Pedro Sanz

President of the Spanish Socialist Workers' Party
- Incumbent
- Assumed office 17 June 2017
- Preceded by: Micaela Navarro

Minister of Environment
- In office 18 April 2004 – 14 April 2008
- Prime Minister: José Luis Rodríguez Zapatero
- Preceded by: Elvira Rodríguez
- Succeeded by: Elena Espinosa

Member of the Senate
- In office 21 May 2019 – 17 August 2023
- Constituency: Madrid

Member of the Congress of Deputies
- Incumbent
- Assumed office 17 August 2023
- Constituency: Madrid
- In office 13 December 2011 – 10 January 2013
- Constituency: Madrid
- In office 2 April 2004 – 30 April 2008
- Constituency: Madrid
- In office 21 March 1996 – 5 April 2000
- Constituency: Almería

Member of the City Council of Madrid
- In office 13 June 1999 – 16 June 2003

Personal details
- Born: 29 July 1951 (age 75) Madrid, Spain
- Party: Spanish Socialist Workers' Party
- Spouse: Josep Borrell (m. 2018)
- Education: Sapienza University of Rome

María Cristina Narbona Ruiz (born 29 July 1951) is a Spanish politician who served as First Vice President of the Senate. She also presides over the Spanish Socialist Workers' Party (PSOE).

From 18 April 2004 to April 2008, she served as Minister of Environment in the government of José Luis Rodríguez Zapatero. She is a trustee of the Fundación IDEAS, a think tank linked to the PSOE.

== Biography ==
Narbona was born in Madrid. At the age of 12, she emigrated to Rome with her parents, where she obtained a degree in economics before returning to Spain in 1975. Subsequently, she taught at the University of Seville and served in the regional government of Andalucia. In 1993 she joined the Spanish Socialist Workers' Party (PSOE). She served in the local government of Madrid in several capacities. She has represented Madrid in the Spanish Congress since 2000.

On 18 June 2017, she was elected president of the Spanish Socialist Workers' Party. Having been in a relationship with fellow PSOE politician Josep Borrell since 1998, they married in July 2018.

She tested positive for the COVID-19 on 1 February 2021 during the pandemic in Spain, but with mild symptoms.

== Political views ==
In a 2002 interview with Telemadrid, Narbona argued that the price of housing in Spain was excessive and out of reach of young people, and called for more government aid in the housing sector.

Narbona is an opponent of nuclear power and supports the gradual closure of nuclear plants in Spain. She has also supported the implementation of the Kyoto Protocols in Spain.

Political offices
Preceded by Vicente Albero	Secretary of State of the Environment and Housing; 1993–1996	Succeeded by Benigno Blanco
Preceded by Elvira Rodríguez	Minister of the Environment; 2004–2008	Succeeded by Elena Espinosa
Preceded by Pedro Sanz Alonso	First Vice President of the Senate; 2019–present	Incumbent
Party political offices
Preceded by Micaela Navarro	President of the Spanish Socialist Workers' Party; 2017–present	Incumbent
