= Curtailment in Chile =

Curtailment in Chile refers to the intentional reduction or shutdown of renewable energy electricity generation, mainly solar power and wind power. It occurs when renewable generators are capable of producing electricity, but the system cannot transmit or use all of it. This can happen because of high local production, low demand at certain times of day, or the difficulty of adjusting supply quickly enough to match demand. In Chile, the phenomenon is known as vertimiento (literally "spilling"). Curtailment has increased as Chile has rapidly expanded its renewable energy capacity over the past decade. The country now generates a significant share of its electricity from solar and wind, but the infrastructure needed to carry that electricity to where it is needed has not always kept pace.

== Chile's electricity system ==
Chile’s electricity system is shaped by its geography. The country extends over 4,000 kilometres from north to south and is served by a single main grid, the Sistema Eléctrico Nacional (SEN), which spans approximately 3,100 km of territory.

The northern regions, particularly the Atacama Desert and Antofagasta, host the majority of Chile’s solar generation capacity. This reflects the Atacama Desert’s exceptionally high solar irradiance, due to its altitude, low cloud cover, and atmospheric conditions. The vast portions of uninhabited land in the region have also made it easier to build large solar installations.

In contrast, the main centres of electricity demand are located around Santiago and major industrial zones, more than 1,000 kilometres to the south. This geographic mismatch between generation and consumption has been identified as a key driver of curtailment.

== Magnitude ==
Between January 2022 and May 2025, approximately 11,900 gigawatt-hour (GWh) of renewable electricity were curtailed in Chile, roughly equivalent to the annual consumption of 2.77 million households, representing an estimated US$562 million in lost revenues.

In 2024 alone, curtailed generation reached approximately 5.6 to 5.9 terawatt-hours (TWh), representing around 18.1% of variable renewable output (electricity from sources whose generation depends on weather conditions, mainly solar and wind) that year. In 2025, curtailed output exceeded 6 TWh (6,084 GWh), about 8% higher than in 2024. Without operational battery storage systems, curtailment could have reached approximately 8 TWh.

Chile's 18.1% curtailment rate is among the highest documented in established electricity systems. For comparison, China reported solar and wind curtailment of around 6.6% and 5.7% respectively in the first half of 2025, while Germany reported 3.1% of curtailed solar generation and 4.8% of curtailed wind generation. Curtailment is concentrated in northern Chile, where solar generation is highest and transmission constraints limit delivery to central demand centres.

== Causes ==
Curtailment in Chile has been attributed to structural, geographic, technical, market-related, and regulatory factors.

Transmission congestion is the most immediate cause. Chile's electricity grid must carry power over very long distances, from the solar-rich north to the demand-heavy centre. Three factors combine to explain this: the rapid expansion of solar and wind energy from 2015 onwards; the location of these renewable resources away from conventional power plants; and delays in the commissioning of transmission lines. Building long-distance lines requires extensive planning, environmental assessment, and regulatory approval, often taking several years. During periods of peak solar output, when generation briefly exceeds line capacity, grid operators must instruct generators to reduce or stop production to prevent overloading the network.

System flexibility limitations also play an important role. Flexibility refers to the ability of the electricity system to quickly adjust the balance between supply and demand. Chile's grid was historically built around hydropower and fossil fuels, whose output can be increased or decreased in a controlled way. Solar and wind energy, by contrast, depend on weather conditions and cannot be easily adjusted. When large amounts of solar power enter the grid simultaneously, the system needs other resources, such as battery storage, adjustable power plants, or programmes that encourage consumers to shift their electricity use to peak production times (known as demand response), to absorb the surplus. Chile currently has limited capacity of this kind, though it is growing.

Market and regulatory factors also contribute to curtailment. The rules governing Chile's electricity market do not always adequately reward operators who provide flexibility services or who invest in storage, and renewable generators who are forced to curtail their output lose revenue without necessarily receiving compensation. The rapid cost reductions in solar energy since 2015 made new generation capacity highly attractive to investors, but the planning and permitting timelines for transmission infrastructure were not designed to keep pace with such rapid deployment.

Permitting and regulatory delays have slowed the expansion of transmission infrastructure. Transmission projects must undergo environmental impact assessments, land access negotiations, and approvals from multiple government agencies. Projects affecting Indigenous lands are subject to additional consultation requirements. These processes can take several years, during which renewable capacity continues to be installed faster than the grid can accommodate.

Similar causes have been observed in other countries with high shares of renewable energy, including transmission congestion, balancing constraints, and limits on system flexibility.

== Actors ==
Several institutions play complementary roles in monitoring, regulating, and responding to curtailment in Chile: the Ministry of Energy sets long-term strategy, the CNE establishes the regulatory framework, and the CEN applies these rules in real-time grid operations.

The Ministry of Energy develops national energy policy through its Planificación Energética de Largo Plazo (PELP), projecting future demand, planning renewable deployment, and identifying transmission needs.

The Comisión Nacional de Energía (CNE) sets the rules for how electricity markets operate, determines how network access is priced, and coordinates planning for transmission expansion. These planning mechanisms aim to align infrastructure development with the rapid expansion of renewable generation capacity, which has accelerated since the 2010s.

The Coordinador Eléctrico Nacional is the independent body responsible for running the electricity grid on a day-to-day basis. It decides in real time which power plants generate electricity and how much, ensures the grid remains stable, and publishes detailed operational data including information on curtailment levels and locations.

International organizations, such as the International Energy Agency (IEA) monitor Chile's energy transition and provide technical recommendations, including on storage deployment, grid flexibility, and transmission investment.

Private sector actors, including renewable energy developers, electricity generators, and storage companies, invest in grid-scale storage and hybrid projects that combine solar or wind generation with batteries to store surplus electricity for delayed use. They also participate in regulatory consultations to help shape market rules and infrastructure plans.

== Policies and Measures ==
Chilean authorities have introduced several laws and programmes to address curtailment and improve renewable integration.

The Electricity Transmission Law (Law No. 20.936/2016) established a coordinated national framework for planning transmission infrastructure. It strengthened the role of the system operator, introduced long-term planning obligations, and required transmission networks to be open to all generators on equal terms. The law aims to facilitate renewable energy integration and reduce structural congestion.

The Energy Storage and Electromobility Law (Law No. 21.505/2022) allowed battery storage systems to participate in electricity markets and earn revenue independently, rather than only as an add-on to a power plant. This change made investment in standalone storage financially viable, encouraging operators to build batteries that can absorb surplus renewable electricity and release it when demand is higher.

The Energy Transition Law (Law No. 21.721/2024) aims to accelerate the construction of new transmission lines by simplifying the permitting process and reducing administrative delays.

In addition, the CNE regularly opens planning processes for transmission and distribution expansion, and the government has organised competitive auctions for grid-scale battery storage to increase system flexibility.

== Resistance and Challenges ==
Despite these measures, reducing curtailment remains challenging. Building a new transmission line requires technical approval from the CEN, an environmental impact assessment, land access agreements with private landowners, and, where Indigenous communities are affected, a formal consultation process under Chilean and international law. Each of these steps can take years, and legal challenges may cause further delays, meaning that new transmission capacity does not always come online at the same pace as new renewable installations.

Coordination among the Ministry of Energy, the CNE, the CEN, environmental regulators, and regional governments, adds further complexity. Responsibilities are distributed across bodies with different mandates and timelines, which can slow decision-making and contribute to persistent infrastructure gaps.

== Future Evolution ==
The most significant infrastructure project currently under construction is the Kimal–Lo Aguirre high-voltage direct current (HVDC) transmission line, spanning 1,346 km from the Antofagasta Region to the Metropolitan Region of Santiago, with a capacity of up to 3,000 MW. Construction began in early 2026 and the line is planned to become operational in 2029. Once operational, it is expected to substantially reduce northern transmission congestion. Combined with planned storage auctions and the streamlined permitting introduced by the 2024 Energy Transition Law, curtailment in Chile is expected to decline. However, renewable capacity is continuing to grow rapidly, meaning the pace of infrastructure improvements will need to match that of new installations.
