= Energy secretary =

Energy secretary may refer to:

- Secretary of State for Energy (Spain)
- United States Secretary of Energy
- Secretary of State for Energy Security and Net Zero, in the United Kingdom
