= Instituto para la Diversificación y Ahorro de la Energía =

The Institute for the Diversification and Saving of Energy (IDAE) is an agency of the Spanish Ministry for the Ecological Transition through the Secretariat of State for Energy. Sara Aagesen, Secretary of State, is the president of IDAE, and Joan Groizard the current CEO.

== Objectives ==
The objectives of the organisation are to:

-Promote the use of new technologies of replacement and savings in industry, agriculture, services, homes, buildings and transport areas.

-Manage and track savings plans and national energy efficiency.

-Promote the rational and efficient use of energy, both in the business and the household environment.

-Collaborate with the European Commission in the management of energy programs and support the Spanish companies in obtaining funding to implement these programs, as well as providing support to Spanish companies in international markets, especially in renewable energy.

-Offer integrated energy efficiency sectors that require a catalyst for implementation.

== See also ==
- Comisión Nacional de Energía
- Electric vehicle
- Ministry of Industry (Spain)
- Net metering
- Renewable energy in Spain
- Renewable energy in the European Union
