= José Domínguez Abascal =

Spanish engineer and politician (1953–2024)

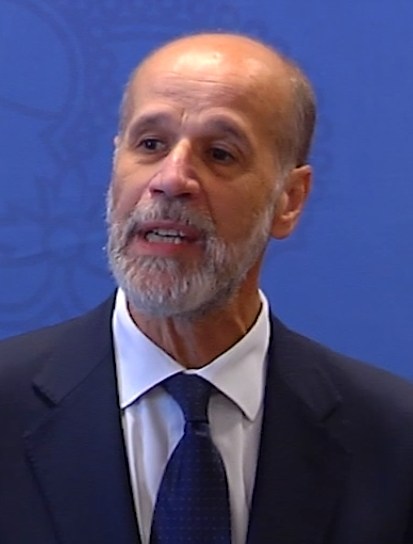
- Domínguez in 2018

Secretary of State for Energy
- In office 19 June 2018 – 17 January 2020
- Monarch: Felipe VI
- President: Pedro Sánchez
- Preceded by: Daniel Navia Simón
- Succeeded by: Sara Aagesen Muñoz

Personal details
- Born: 19 November 1953 Seville, Spain
- Died: 1 June 2024 (aged 70)
- Education: University of Seville
- Occupation: Engineer

José Domínguez Abascal (19 November 1953 – 1 June 2024) was a Spanish engineer and politician. He served as Secretary of State for Energy from 2018 to 2020.

Domínguez died on 1 June 2024, at the age of 70.
