= Secretary of State for Energy (Spain) =

Government official

- Secretario de Estado de Energía
- Coat of Arms used by the Government

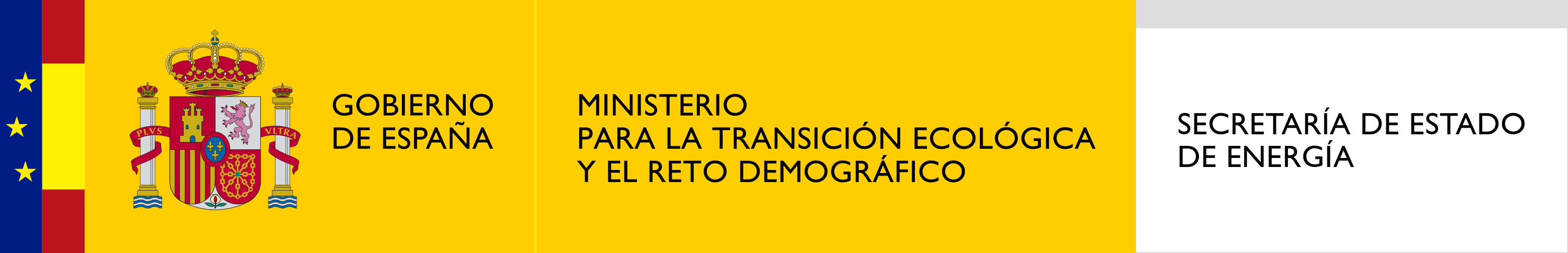

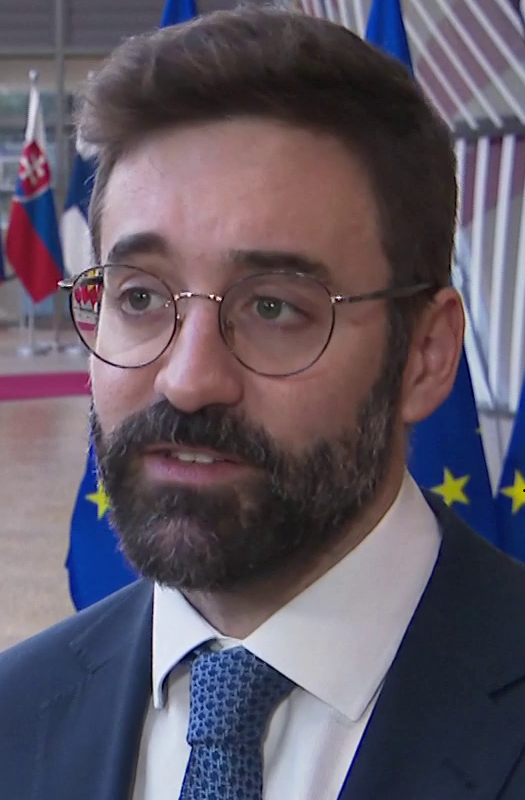
- Incumbent; Joan Groizard Payeras since 29 November 2024
- Ministry for the Ecological Transition; Secretariat of State for Energy
- Style: The Most Excellent (formal); Mr. Secretary of State (informal)
- Member of: Specialized Committee on Energy Security
- Nominator: The Ecological Transition Minister
- Appointer: The Monarch
- Precursor: General Secretary for Energy and Mineral Resources
- Formation: May 11, 1996
- First holder: Nemesio Fernández-Cuesta
- Website: energia.gob.es

The secretary of state for energy is a senior minister of the Spanish Ministry for the Ecological Transition responsible for the energy and mining policies.

The secretary of state designs the Spanish mining and energy policies to ensure energy supply and comply with environmental goals such us decarbonization, air quality and economic growth in the area. In addition, the secretary of state is responsible for overseeing and regulating energy markets, as well as protecting consumers and reducing energy poverty.

The secretary of state is appointed by the monarch on the advice the minister for the ecological transition. Since 29 November 2024, the secretary of state is Joan Groizard Payeras.

== History ==
The energy policy in Spain has been traditionally bound to the industrial policy and started taking more importance in 1979, when the Ministry of Industry was modified and named Ministry of Industry and Energy.

However, it wasn't until 1996 that the energy was granted with its own higher body, the Secretariat of State for Energy and Minieral Resources, assuming the competences of the General Secretariat for Energy and Mineral Resources. The life of this body was very short, being integrated in the Secretariat of State for Industry between 1998 and 2000 and in the Secretariat of State for Economy between 2000 and 2002, both bodies within the Ministry of Economy. In 2002, the competences over economy and over Energy and SMEs split in two Secretariats of State recovering its autonomy for 2 years until the change of government of 2004, when the new prime minister relegated the body to a General Secretariat level within the Ministry of Industry, Tourism and Trade. In 2009 was re-created.

The zenith of its autonomy reached it in 2016 when the prime minister split the Ministry of Industry originating a new Ministry of Energy that assumed also the competences over Tourism and Telecommunications.

In 2018, the new government modification integrated the Secretariat of State in the Ministry of Environment in order to establish a transversal environmental policy. This new ministry integrated all the environmental-related competences (except for industrial ones) and received the name of Ministry for the Ecological Transition.

In 2024, a new directorate-general for energy planning and coordination was established. This new body also manage nuclear energy policy.

=== Names ===
- Secretary of State for Energy and Mineral Resources (1996–1998)
- Secretary of State for Industry and Energy (1998–2000)
- Secretary of State for Economy, Energy and SMEs (2000–2002)
- Secretary of State for Energy, Industrial Development and SMEs (2002–2004)
- From 2004 and 2009, the competences were assumed by the General Secretary for Energy
- Secretary of State for Energy (2009–present)

== Organization ==
As of 2026, this is the organization of the Secretariat of State:

Secretariat of State Organization (2026)
Secretary of State	Cabinet
Secretary of State	Institute for Just Transition
Secretary of State	Instituto para la Diversificación y Ahorro de la Energía
Secretary of State	Energy City Foundation
Secretary of State	National Energy Efficiency Fund
Secretary of State	National Radioactive Waste Enterprise
Secretary of State	Strategic Petroleum Reserves Corporation
Directorate-General for Energy Policy and Mines	Deputy Directorate-General for Hydrocarbons and New Fuels
Directorate-General for Energy Policy and Mines	Deputy Directorate-General for Electrical Energy
Directorate-General for Energy Policy and Mines	Deputy Directorate-General for Mines
Directorate-General for Energy Policy and Mines	Deputy Directorate-General for Renewable Energies
Directorate-General for Energy Policy and Mines	Deputy Directorate-General for Infrastructure and Integration of the Energy System
Directorate-General for Energy Policy and Mines	Deputy Directorate-General for Storage and Flexibility
Directorate-General for Energy Planning and Coordination	Deputy Directorate-General for Energy Forecasting and Statistics
Directorate-General for Energy Planning and Coordination	Deputy Directorate-General for Energy Efficiency and Access
Directorate-General for Energy Planning and Coordination	Deputy Directorate-General for Nuclear Energy
Directorate-General for Energy Planning and Coordination	Division for Energy Coordination

== List of secretaries ==
No.	Image	Name	Term of office			Prime Minister
No.	Image	Name	Began	Ended	Days of service	Prime Minister
1.º		Nemesio Fernández-Cuesta	11 May 1996	26 September 1998	868	José María Aznar
2.º		José Manuel Serra Peris	30 September 1998	6 May 2000	584	José María Aznar
3.º		José Folgado Blanco	29 April 2000	20 April 2004	1452	José María Aznar
Competencies assumed by the Secretary General for Energy (2004–2009)
4.º		Pedro Marín Uribe	18 April 2009	10 January 2011	632	José Luis Rodríguez Zapatero
5.º		Fabricio Hernández Pampaloni	10 January 2011	31 December 2011	355	José Luis Rodríguez Zapatero
6.º		Fernando Marti Scharfhausen	31 December 2011	29 December 2012	364	Mariano Rajoy
7.º		Alberto Nadal	29 December 2012	12 November 2016	1414	Mariano Rajoy
8.º		Joan Mesquida Ferrando	19 November 2016	19 June 2018	577	Mariano Rajoy
9.º		José Domínguez Abascal	19 June 2018	18 January 2020	578	Pedro Sánchez
10.º		Sara Aagesen Muñoz	18 January 2020	25 November 2024	1773	Pedro Sánchez
11.º		Joan Groizard Payeras	29 November 2024	Incumbent	647	Pedro Sánchez
