= Renewable energy in Spain =

Renewable Energy in Spain

Renewable Energy (RE)
- RE as % of Gross Final Energy Consumption.: 21.2% (2020)
- NREAP target for above: 20.0% (2020)

Renewable Electricity
- Percentage electricity generated by RE.: 55.8% (2024)
- RE generated / Total electricity generation.: 111,459/266,867 GWh Net(2014)
- Record % RE covered electricity consumption: 70.4% (21/11/15 wind only)

Installed capacity (2024)
- Wind Power: 31.7 GW
- Bio Energy: 1.2 GW
- Solar Power: 33.7 GW
- Hydro Power: 20.0 GW
- Geothermal: 0 GW
- Total renewable: 86.6 GW

Renewable energy in Spain, consisting of bioenergy, wind, solar, and hydro sources, accounted for 25.0% of the Total Energy Supply (TES) in 2023. In the same year, the share of electricity generated from renewable sources reached 50.3%, reflecting the country's progress towards its decarbonisation goals. Wind energy production reached 24.5%, hydroelectric 13.6%, and solar 20.3% of total energy production in 2023. In 2024, renewables already covered 64% of Spain's electricity generation, mainly from wind and solar.

Spain expanded wind power rapidly in the early 2000s and later experienced strong growth in solar photovoltaic capacity. Renewable expansion accelerated after 2018 following the adoption of updated national and EU climate and energy frameworks, including Spains Integrated National Energy and Climate Plan (PNIEC) for 2021-2030.

Spain, along with other European Union (EU) States, has a target of generating 32% of all its energy needs from renewable energy sources by 2030. A previous target of 20% for 2020, with an additional 0.8% available for other EU countries under the cooperation mechanism, was reached and slightly surpassed. Under the revised EU Renewable Energy Directive (RED III, 2023), the new binding target is 42.5% by 2030, with an aspiration to reach 45%.

The European Environment Agency reports that renewable energy growth, particularly in wind and solar power, has reduced Spain's reliance on coal and oil and reshaped its electricity mix, with renewables surpassing nuclear generation since 2012. However, challenges remain in reducing final energy consumption and meeting the 2030 efficiency targets. In addition, economic losses due to extreme weather events have exceeded EUR 95 billion since 1980.

Spain has many energy related national policies, including the Climate Change and Energy Transition Act of 2021 aims for climate neutrality by 2050, with targets including 74% renewable energy production, a ban on polluting vehicle sales by 2040, and mandatory low-emission zones in cities. The Integrated National Energy and Climate Plan (2021-2030) aligns with EU goals, aiming to cut greenhouse gas emissions by 40%. Royal Decree 244/2019 promotes rooftop solar adoption with financial incentives for surplus energy exports. While renewable energy employment declined after 2015, the sector has been recovering since 2018, though regional growth remains uneven.

== Development ==
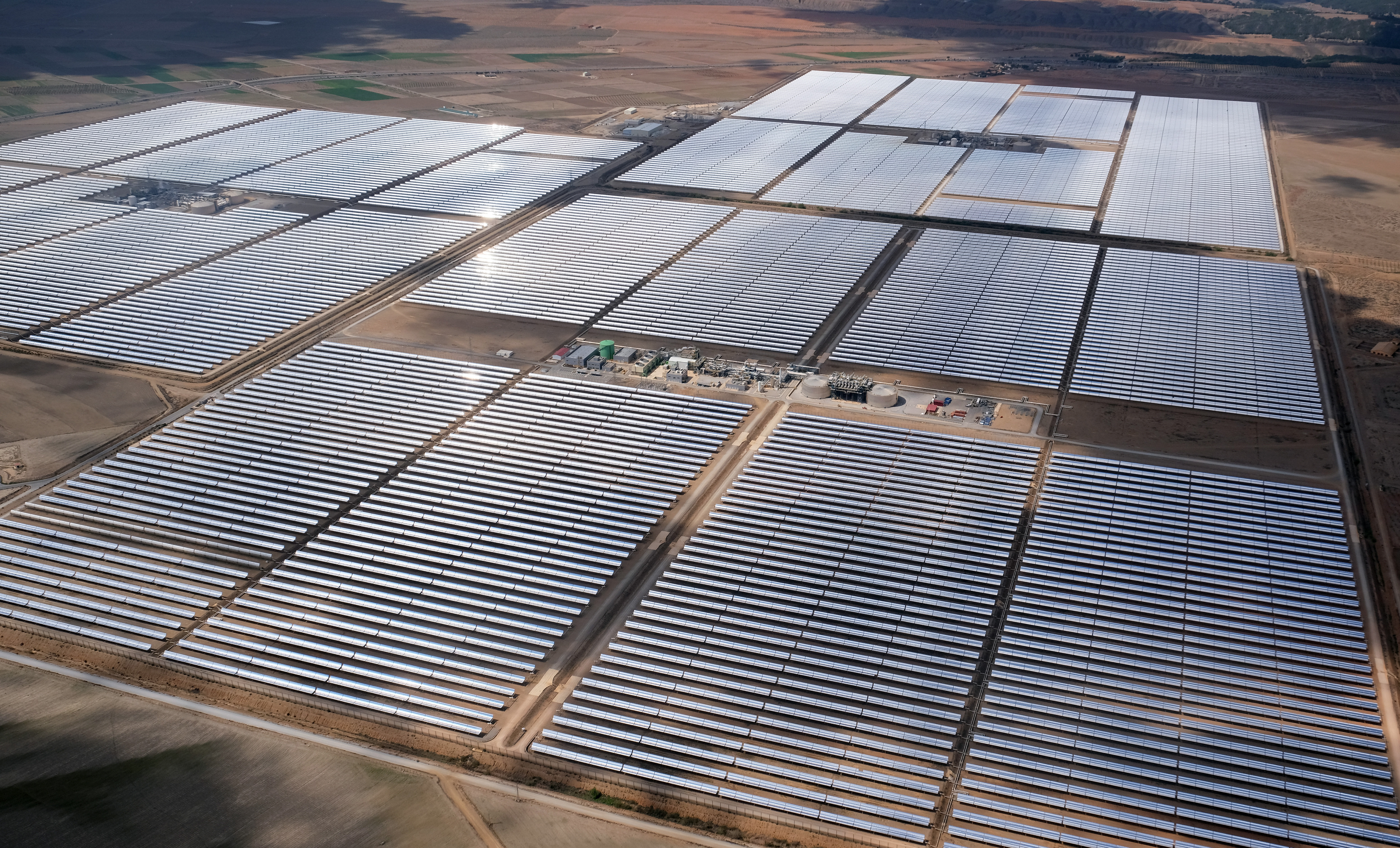
Andasol is the first parabolic trough power plant in Europe, and Andasol 1 went online in March 2009. Because of the high altitude (1,100 m) and the semi-arid climate, the site has exceptionally high annual direct insolation of 2,200 kWh/m^{2} per year.

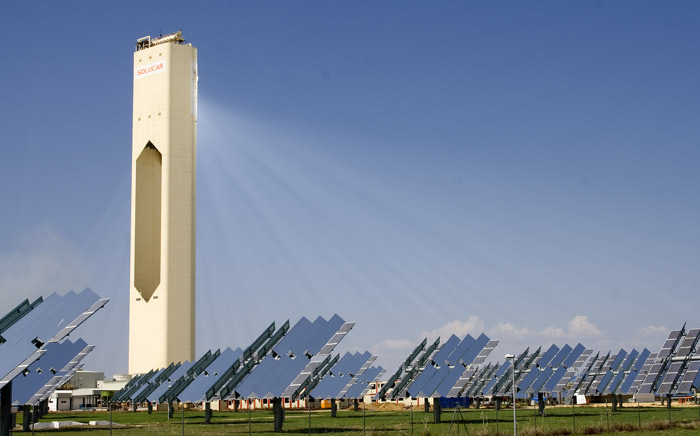
PS10 solar power plant

In the early 2000s, the growth of wind power contributed to an increase in Spain's renewable electricity production. By 2021, wind and solar energy made up 23% and 8% of total electricity generation, respectively. The installation of photovoltaic (PV) plants beginning in 2007 played a key role in this increase, doubling the renewables' share in Spain's electricity mix from 20% in 2008 to 40% in 2013. After this period of growth, the share of renewables in Spain's electricity generation leveled off, reaching 37% by 2019, and 47% by 2021.

Spain's renewable energy sector has undergone significant shifts, initially driven by the 1997 Special Regime and Royal Decree 661/2007, which promoted considerable growth in wind and solar PV installations through favorable conditions and feed-in tariffs. However, the dynamics of the sector shifted following legislative reforms in 2012, marked by the enactment of Law 24/2013 and Royal Decree 413/2014. These reforms introduced a new financial framework for the electricity market, modifying compensation mechanisms for renewable sources, which led to a deceleration in new developments. Consequently, the rapid increase in renewable capacity, notably in wind energy, from 2.2 GW in 2000 to 23.0 GW in 2013, slowed, with only a slight rise to 23.4 GW by 2018. Solar PV installations experienced a similar trend.

In 2015 Spain introduced Royal Decree 900/2015 regulating electricity self-consumption, sometimes referred to as the "tax on the sun." The policy introduced charges on electricity generated and consumed through photovoltaic self-consumption systems connected to the grid. Studies examining the policy have found that it was associated with a slowdown in the adoption of PV self-consumption systems in several Spanish regions. The regulation was later repealed in 2018 as part of broader reforms promoting renewable energy and self-consumption.

The tax created controversy among stakeholders. On the one hand, the government has argued that those generating their own power still rely on the national grid for power backup and so should be liable for contributing to the cost. On the other hand, the solar industry has argued that the government is simply trying to protect the centralized established power producers whose revenues would be threatened by this competitive solar threat. Environmentalists have criticized the tax for artificially blocking Spain from continuing its long standing movement to renewable energy production.

Spain is advancing Europe's energy autonomy with Iberdrola's renewable energy projects, supported by a €1 billion loan from the European Investment Bank in a deal signed in June 2023. Iberdrola plans to build 19 solar photovoltaic power plants and three onshore wind farms in Spain, Portugal, and Germany, with a total capacity of nearly 2.2 gigawatts. These projects aim to generate 4 terawatt-hours of electricity, equal to the annual consumption of over 1 million households. Importantly, 70% of these installations will be in rural areas affected by the transition to net-zero emissions, fostering regional development. To ensure a stable power supply, Iberdrola will integrate hybrid battery systems into its photovoltaic projects. These plants are expected to be operational by the end of 2028, aligning with the European Commission's REPowerEU plan to reduce fossil fuel imports and accelerate the green transition and Directive 2009/28/EC of the European Union (EU).

In 2023, Spain set new records in renewable energy generation, with over half (50.3%) of its electricity coming from wind, solar, and hydropower. The country installed an additional 5,594 MW of solar photovoltaic power, a 28% increase from 2022, making solar 20.3% of the energy mix. This contributed to a 15.1% rise in renewable energy production and a nearly 28% reduction in greenhouse gas emissions. Wind power remained the top energy source at 24.5%, followed by combined cycle (20.9%), solar (20.3%), and hydropower (13.6%). Coal saw the steepest decline, dropping by 50.1% to just 1.5% of the mix. Spain also maintained high service quality and recorded one of its highest electricity export surpluses.

== Energy Policy ==
=== Climate Change and Energy Transition Act of 2021 ===
The Climate Change and Energy Transition Act was passed by Congress with the aim to comply with the goals of the 2015 Paris Agreement and reach climate neutrality (full decarbonization and a 100% renewable energy grid) by 2050. Specific objectives include:

- Achieving at least 42% of total final renewable energy consumption and 74% total renewable energy production
- Ending the sale of polluting vehicles by 2040
- Requiring all cities with over 50,000 residents to adopt sustainability mobility plans that include low-emission zones,
- Requiring cities of over 20,000 residents to approve low-emissions zones if their air quality is poor
- Establishing charging points at gas stations and buildings with more than 20 parking spots
- Promoting financing of public transportation
- Prohibiting new hydrocarbon extraction projects (fracking)
- Promoting installation of solar panels for private use/ self-consumption

The government will be required to revise the law every five years according to progress made. The revisions will include national plans for adaptation to climate change that identify risks and impacts on natural systems, territories, people, and socio-economic sectors. The law also includes a committee of scientific experts on climate change to be established as the leaders in evaluating issues and making recommendations.

=== Integrated National Energy and Climate Plan ===
Every EU member state was required to submit a climate and energy plan to the European Commission by the end of 2019. Spain's Integrated National Energy and Climate Plan is an implementation plan outlining Spain's pathway to achieve its climate and energy targets for the years 2021-2030 in alignment with the European Union's climate and energy framework and overall, 2030 goals. Its specific targets include reducing greenhouse gas emissions by 40%, increasing the share of renewable energy to at least 32% of EU energy use, and improving energy efficiency by at least 32.5%. It details policies and measures in all sectors needed for this transition, including energy, transport, agriculture, waste management, and more. The plan also focuses on energy sharing and exportation/ importation. It lays out goals to intensify regional cooperation between Portugal, Spain, and France to provide stable energy security.

=== Royal Decree 244/ 2019 ===
To promote the adoption of renewable energy, Royal Decree 244/2019 was enacted. It established a framework for the nationwide deployment of rooftop solar panel installations. It also introduced a financial mechanism that allows for bill reductions based on the electricity exported to the grid, with compensation determined by the hourly wholesale price and capped by actual consumption. Additionally, this framework supports shared self-consumption installations, enabling multiple consumers to collectively benefit from a single renewable energy system.

== Employment in Renewable Energy ==
Initially, there was growing national interest in renewable energy, but a sharp decline in production and employment occurred after 2015. However, since 2018, the sector has shown signs of recovery, with renewed confidence in meeting national goals. Despite this, short-term job growth in the industry remains overall limited. At the regional level, growth has been uneven, with Extremadura, Galicia, and Navarra outperforming the national average. To address this, the EU has implemented financial mechanisms, such as European Funds, to reduce these gaps. Moving forward, Spain must establish a unified renewable energy policy to promote regional balance of employment growth in the industry.

== Energy consumption by sector ==
Projected total gross final energy consumption by sector in 2020 (calculated as per NREAP criteria.)
1. Heating and cooling (32.5%)
2. Electricity (33.6%)
3. Transport (33.9%)

All EU countries as well as Iceland and Norway submitted National Renewable Energy Action Plans (NREAPs) to outline the steps taken, and projected progress by each country between 2010 and 2020 to meet the Renewable Energy Directive. Each plan contains a detailed breakdown of each country's current renewable energy usage and plans for future developments. According to projections by the updated Spanish submission dated 20/12/11 by 2020 the gross final energy consumption in Spain by sector breaks down as follows.

Projected energy use by sector in 2020	ktoe	RE 2020 target	RE 2020 consumption
Heating and cooling	30,929	17.3%	18%
Electricity	31,961	39.0%	42.9%
Transport	32.301	11.3%	9.5%
Gross final energy consumption*	98.693	20.0%	21.2%

- Including losses and adjustments

According to NREAP criteria around a third of energy consumption (32.5%) is used in the heating and cooling sector. The heating and cooling sector (also known as the thermal sector) includes domestic heating and air conditioning, industrial processes such as furnaces and any use of heat generally. The electricity sector and transport sector are also projected to account for around a third of energy consumption each at 33.6% and 33.9% respectively. The proportion of energy use in each sector is similar to that of 2016. In order to meet Spain's overall target for 20% use of renewable energy (it was just 8.3% in 2005) in gross final energy consumption (20,505 ktoe) by 2020 targets have been set for each sector as follows: 17.3% renewable energy use in the heating and cooling sector, 39% in the electricity sector and 11.3% in the transport sector. Total annual energy consumption is projected to be 98,693 ktoe (98.7 million tonnes of oil equivalent) by 2020. The report expected Spain to produce a surplus of 0.8% above the 20% target (20.8% total) for renewable energy use which would be available for other countries to meet their renewable energy targets under the "cooperation mechanism".

The energy measures above are gross final energy consumption. Another broader measure, primary energy consumption also includes energy used in the extraction of fuels (the energy sector) and energy lost in transformation (the transformation sector, i.e. converting heat to electricity in power plants or fuel energy to heat in heating plants) as well as gross final energy consumption for end users. Under the European Union Energy Efficiency Directive EU countries submit their Energy Efficiency Plans every three years and Energy Efficiency Annual Reports every year. According to Spain's 2016 Energy Efficiency Annual Report the country's total final energy consumption in 2014 was 79.2 Mtoes whilst its primary energy consumption was 112.6 Mtoes. Most of the approximately 42% difference is accounted for in losses in the transformation sector. These losses are likely to be most prevalent in thermal electricity sectors, thus the use of renewable electricity will reduce CO_{2} emissions and fuels lost in the energy and transformation sectors as well as those in final consumption. By using more efficient thermal generation the potential remains to reduce energy wastage by almost a third and to cut CO_{2} emissions accordingly.

== Electricity Sector ==
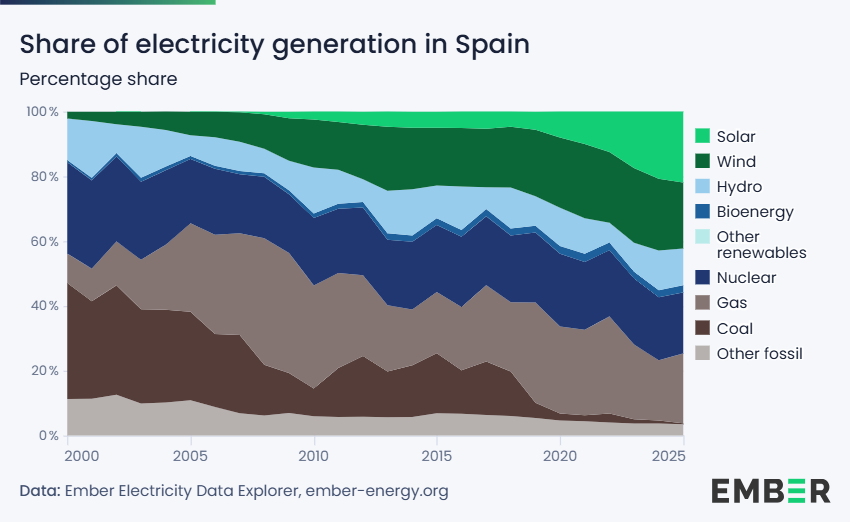
Spain electricity generation by source - percentage share

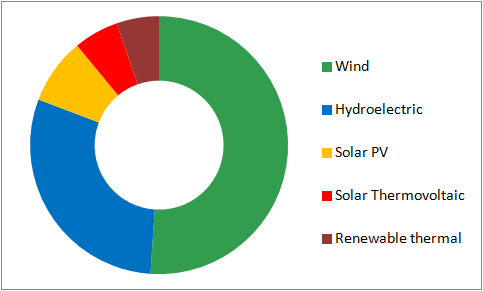
Components of renewable electricity coverage in Spain 2015.

In 2015, wind power provided the largest share at 19.1% followed by hydroelectric power at 11.1%. Solar power provided 5.2% and renewable thermal a further 2%. The total electricity supplied (demand coverage) from renewables was 37.4% of Spain's requirements in 2015. The current generational mix of electricity production can be checked in real time on the Red Electrica de Espana website.

Sharp variation from one year to the next is largely due to the substantial differences in hydroelectric production from one year to the next. Excluding hydroelectric production electricity generation from renewable energy sources grew from around 10 percent in 2006 to 26.3 percent of demand coverage in 2015. Most of the growth occurred in the years leading up to 2012 with little change in baseline capacity between 2012 and 2015. Renewable energy generated electricity had a record year in 2014 when it supplied 42.8% of Spain's national demand.

Total annual net generation from renewable sources has grown from around 60 TWh in 2007 to close to 100-110 TWh in the years 2013–2015. Wind power overtook hydroelectric power as the largest source of renewable electricity from around 2008 onwards to produce around 50 TWh from 2013 onwards. Hydroelectric power remains to second largest source typically generating between 25 and 45 TWh per year depending on whether the year is a wet or dry one. Solar PV power grew from just 484 GWh in 2007 to 8,202 GWh by 2012 and has remained at a similar level through to 2015. Solar thermal power grew from almost no presence at 8 GWh in 2007 to 5,085 GWh by 2015. Renewable thermal and other sources have grown from around 2,589 GWh in 2007 to 4,625 GWh in 2015. Total electricity generation from all sources has fallen in Spain from 288 TWh in 2007 to 267 TWh by 2015, a fall of around 7%.

Electricity coverage by renewables (%)

== Heating and cooling sector ==
Renewable energy in the heating and cooling sector, final energy consumption 2014
Source	ktoe	Estimated share of total sector (all sources)
Biomass	3,862	13.65%
of which: -solid biomass	3,761	13.29%
-biogas	101	0.36%
-bio liquids	0	0%
RE from heat pumps	332	1.17%
Solar Energy	259	0.92%
Geothermal	19	0.07%
Total	4,471	15.80%

Overall share of energy use in the heating and cooling sector from renewable sources
Year	2011	2012	2013	2014	2015	2016	2017	2018	2019	2020
Percentage of total sector	13.5%	14.0%	14.0%	15.6%	16.9%	15.9%	16.2%	16.1%	17.2%	18.0%

Every two years all EU countries as well as Iceland and Norway submit Progress Reports outlining their renewable energy development and movement towards meeting their 2020 renewable energy targets. According to the Spanish progress reports between 2011 and 2014 renewable energy share in the heating and cooling sector grew from 13.6% to 15.8%. In 2014 biomass provided the largest share of RE in the heating and cooling sector at approximately 13.65% of the total, equating to 3.862 million tonnes of oil equivalent. RE from heat pumps provided a little over 1% of the total sector, solar and geothermal power provided a contribution of 0.92% and 0.07% respectively.

== Transport sector ==
Renewable energy in the transport sector, 2014
Confirmed renewable sources	ktoe
Renewable electricity	119
Hydrogen	0
Total (Confirmed)	119.7
*Unconfirmed renewable biofuels sources	ktoe
Biodiesels	536
Bioethanol	186
HVO (hydro treated vegetable oil)	289
Total (Unconfirmed)	1,010

According to the third Spanish submission of EU country Progress Reports covering the years 2013 and 2014 renewable energy use in the transport sector in Spain and Brazil included renewable electricity accounting for energy use of 119.7 k toe. *The bio fuels listed in the report and the table above had not been confirmed as coming from sustainable sources and were awaiting assessment and possible confirmation and as such are not yet able to be confirmed as renewable energy sources. They are included for information about the sector. The total energy from bio fuels were 1,010 k toe in 2014. Renewable electricity accounted for 0.5% of the total fuel use in the transport sector (using 2020 EU target criteria). A rough calculation would imply that if the bio fuels are finally confirmed as renewable sources then the total renewable energy use in the transport sector would come to approximately 4.7% of the total in 2014.

== Sources ==
=== Wind power ===
In 2014 Spain was the world's fourth biggest producer of wind power. In that year, the year-end installed capacity was 23 GW and the annual production was 51,439 GWh, a share of total electricity consumption of 21.1%. Installed capacity grew from around 0.8GW in 1998 to approximately 23 GW by 2012. As can be seen from the graph, virtually no new wind power has been installed from 2012 to 2017.

Wind power installed capacity (MW)

=== Hydroelectric Power ===
Installed capacity of hydroelectric power has grown by small incremental amounts annually since 2006 from 18,1815 MW in 2006 to 19,468 MW in 2014. Between 2014 and 2015 there was a significant growth in pumped storage generation of 850 MW. Total capacity reached 20,336 MW in 2015.

Hydroelectric installed capacity (MW)

Annual electricity generation from hydroelectric sources varies considerably from year to year. A rough calculation shows that the contribution to total net generation varied approximately between 9-17 percent annually. This variation helps explain the fluctuating annual figures for total renewable energy in Spain. Production in 2012 was a little over half that of 2010 at just 24,100 gW/h.

=== Solar power ===
In 2005 Spain became the first country in Europe to require the installation of photovoltaic electricity generation in new buildings, and the second in the world (after Israel) to require the installation of solar hot water systems. With the construction of the PS10, located near Seville, Spain became the first country to ever have a commercial solar energy power tower. In recent years there has been much controversy over a tax on PV power generation as the cost of PV solar installations has reached grid parity in Spain according to several sources. Solar power first began to be installed significantly in 2006 with 136 MW installed capacity before rising rapidly to 6,949 MW by 2013. Little change in installed capacity occurred between 2013 and 2018, but between 2019 and 2022 Spain doubled its capacity, increasing from 6.3 GW in 2019 to 13.2 GW in 2021.

Installed solar photovoltaic capacity reached 32,350 MW by December 2024, representing 25.1% of Spain's total installed electricity capacity. It surpassed wind power to become the technology with the highest installed capacity in Spain.

Solar photovoltaic integration in Spain includes both large-scale, grid-connected solar power plants and photovoltaic systems installed for self-consumption. Self-consumption installations increased sharply in recent years, causing a noticeable decline in electricity drawn from the national grid, decreasing national electricity demand during daylight hours. This expansion of photovoltaic self-consumption has contributed to surplus electricity generation, creating operational challenges relating to grid stability and system operations.

==== Grid Integration ====
High reliance on solar photovoltaic generation can create operational challenges for electricity systems because photovoltaic output is concentrated during daylight hours and declines rapidly in the afternoon and evening. This pattern reduces net demand on the grid during midday hours, but requires a rapid increase in flexible generation in the afternoon and evening as on-demand solar output declines. This process is often described as the "duck curve" framework.

Studies have therefore examined the potential role of storage technologies, including pumped hydro storage, thermal storage, and hydrogen systems, in balancing renewable energy in Spain's grid.

Solar power installed capacity (MW)

=== Renewable Thermal ===
In 2014 biomass and biogas contributed to around 2% of electricity generation in Spain as well as 13.65% of heat consumed in the heating and cooling sector. In terms of the energy provided to each sector in ktoe (thousand tonnes of oil equivalent), the fuels provided over nine times more energy to the heating and cooling sector.

Renewable thermal installed capacity (MW)

== Production by region ==
Production by source and Autonomous Community:

The following two tables show a snapshot of the generation of electricity from renewable sources in Spain at the end of 2006 and the end of 2013. In 2006 two regions were generating around 70 percent of electricity demand from renewables. By 2013 four regions were generating more electricity from renewables than the total demand within each region. The leading region was Castile and León which generated 164 percent of its total electricity demand.

Renewable Electricity in Spain (GWh, 2006 data)
Autonomous Community	Hydroelectric power (Nationwide)	Wind power	Solar power - all	Biomass power	Solid waste power	Total Renewable Generation	Total Electricity Demand	% Renewable of Total Electricity Demand
Castile and León	6960	3840	14	274	87	11175	15793	70.8%
Galicia	7561	5970	1	242	317	14091	20279	69.5%
La Rioja	124	897	1	3	2	1027	1860	55.2%
Aragón	3073	3342	1	63	8	6487	11885	54.6%
Navarre	379	2248	28	269	0	2924	5401	54.1%
Extremadura	2244	0	1	0	0	2245	5076	44.2%
Castile-La Mancha	710	3935	8	99	34	4786	12686	37.7%
Asturias	1680	357	0	221	400	2658	12391	21.5%
Cantabria	875	0	0	11	41	927	5693	16.3%
Catalonia	3223	301	7	77	241	3849	48498	7.9%
Andalusia	946	1042	5	728	0	2721	40737	6.7%
Basque Country	336	339	3	55	326	1059	20934	5.1%
Valencia	1041	266	13	55	0	1375	27668	5.0%
Canary Islands	0	288	0	0	0	288	9372	3.1%
Balearic Islands	0	5	0	0	133	138	6235	2.2%
Murcia	65	93	6	12	0	176	8334	2.1%
Madrid	83	0	8	58	330	479	30598	1.6%
Ceuta & Melilla	0	0	0	0	2	2	391	0.5%
SPAIN	29301	22924	97	2167	1921	56410	283829	19.9%

Renewable Electricity in Spain (GWh, 2013 data)
Autonomous Community	Hydroelectric power	Hydroelectric power (special regime)	Wind power	Solar thermal	Solar PV	All - Renewable Thermal	Total Renewable Generation	Total Electricity Demand	% Renewable of Total Electricity Demand
Castilla y León	7955	628	12681	0	848	181	22293	13586	164.09%
Extremadura	2855	38	0	1649	1110	150	5802	4586	126.52%
Castilla-La Mancha	551	491	8657	678	1697	238	12312	11745	104.83%
Galicia	8226	1844	9496	0	20	597	20183	19538	103.30%
Aragón	3594	1013	4869	0	309	228	10013	10190	98.26%
Navarra	146	627	2665	0	295	304	4037	4720	85.53%
La Rioja	106	68	1078	0	130	12	1394	1655	84.23%
Asturias	1911	331	1142	0	1	666	4051	10527	38.48%
Andalucía	1303	331	6987	1988	1586	1764	13959	37280	37.44%
Cantabria	611	279	75	0	2	82	1049	4462	23.51%
Cataluña	4607	1099	3195	74	431	259	9665	47122	20.51%
Región de Murcia	76	56	544	43	802	58	1579	7801	20.24%
Comunidad Valenciana	1584	25	2595	10	564	53	4831	25615	18.86%
Canarias	0	3	364	0	287	8	662	8625	7.68%
País Vasco	375	168	356	0	28	187	1114	17316	6.43%
Baleares	0	0	6	0	122	1	129	5674	2.27%
Comunidad de Madrid	69	100	0	0	92	286	547	30169	1.81%
Ceuta y Melilla	0	0	0	0	0.1	0	0.1	412	0.02%
SPAIN	33970	7102	54708	4442	8324	5073	113619	261023	43.53%

== Targets and progress ==
=== Targets ===
Renewable energy target trajectory NREAP report 20/12/11.
	2005	2010	2011	2012	2013	2014	2015	2016	2017	2018	2019	2020
Renewable energy share of heating and cooling sector	8.9%	11.0%	11.3%	11.7%	12.1%	12.5%	13.4%	14.3%	15.1%	15.8%	16.5%	17.3%
Renewable energy share of electricity sector	18.4%	29.2%	31.0%	32.0%	32.7%	33.5%	34.1%	34.4%	35.5%	36.4%	37.4%	39.0%
Renewable energy share of transport sector	0.8%	5.0%	7.1%	7.6%	7.8%	8.0%	8.3%	8.7%	9.1%	9.6%	10.2%	11.3%
Renewable energy share of total energy consumption	8.2%	13.2%	14.4%	15.1%	15.6%	16.1%	16.7%	17.3%	18.1%	18.9%	19.7%	20.8%

The table above shows the expected trajectory for shares of renewable energy in the three sectors as well as the overall target trajectory. The information represents the Spanish submission as one of the European country National Renewable Energy Action Plans (NREAPS). Overall between 2005 and 2020 renewable energy sources are expected to rise from 8.2% of total energy use in 2005 to 20.8% of energy use by 2020.

=== Progress ===
Renewable energy Progress Report Spain, 2013–16.
	2013	2014	2015	2016
Renewable energy share of heating and cooling sector	14.1%	15.8%	16.8%	16.8%
Renewable energy share of electricity sector	36.7%	37.8%	36.9%	36.6%
Renewable energy share of transport sector	0.5%	0.5%	1.2%	5.3%†
Renewable energy share of total energy consumption	15.3%	16.2%	16.2%	17.3%

† 2016 was the first year in which the contribution of biofuels was counted in the transport sector.

According to the third Spanish submission of EU country Progress Reports, (submitted every 2 years), covering the years 2013 and 2014, the country achieved renewable energy shares in each sector as listed in the table above. Spain has a 20.8% renewable energy target in its total energy in order to meet the European Union renewable energy targets for 2020. By 2014 Spain had achieved a 16.2% share of total energy use. Most of the growth occurred in the electricity sector which has grown from 18.4% of the total sector in 2005 to 37.8% by 2014.. During the same period the thermal sector registered a smaller rise from 8.9% to 15.8%. The transport sector remains well below its target trajectory at just 0.5% in 2014, although this may improve if Spanish biofuel use is confirmed as coming from sustainable sources to a level of roughly equal to 4.7% of the sector (see transport sector heading above). Spain's overall target for renewable energy use across all sectors stood at 16.2% of the total in 2014, just above its trajectory target and not a long way short of its 20.8% target for 2020.

== See also ==
- Iberdrola Renovables
- Instituto para la Diversificación y Ahorro de la Energía (IDAE)
- Wind power in Spain
- Solar power in Spain
- Renewable energy by country
- Renewable energy in the European Union
- Wind power in the European Union
- Solar power in the European Union
