= Secretary of State for Environment (Spain) =

Spanish government official

- Secretario de Estado de Medio Ambiente
- Coat of Arms used by the Government

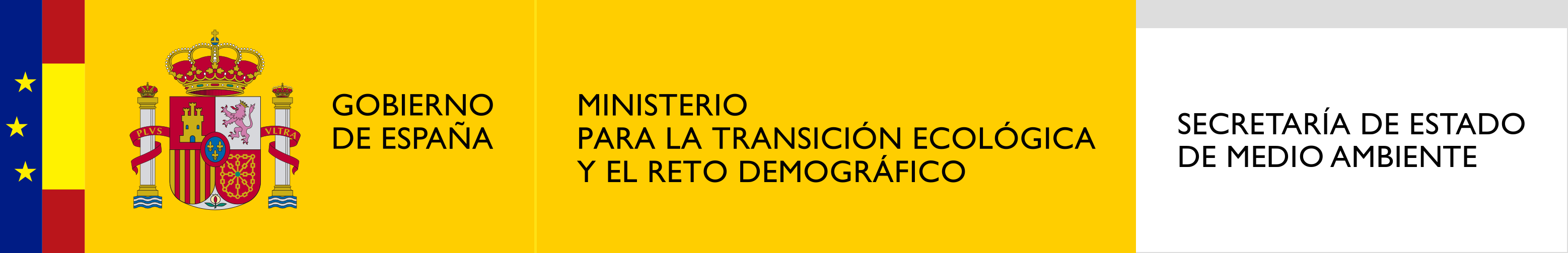

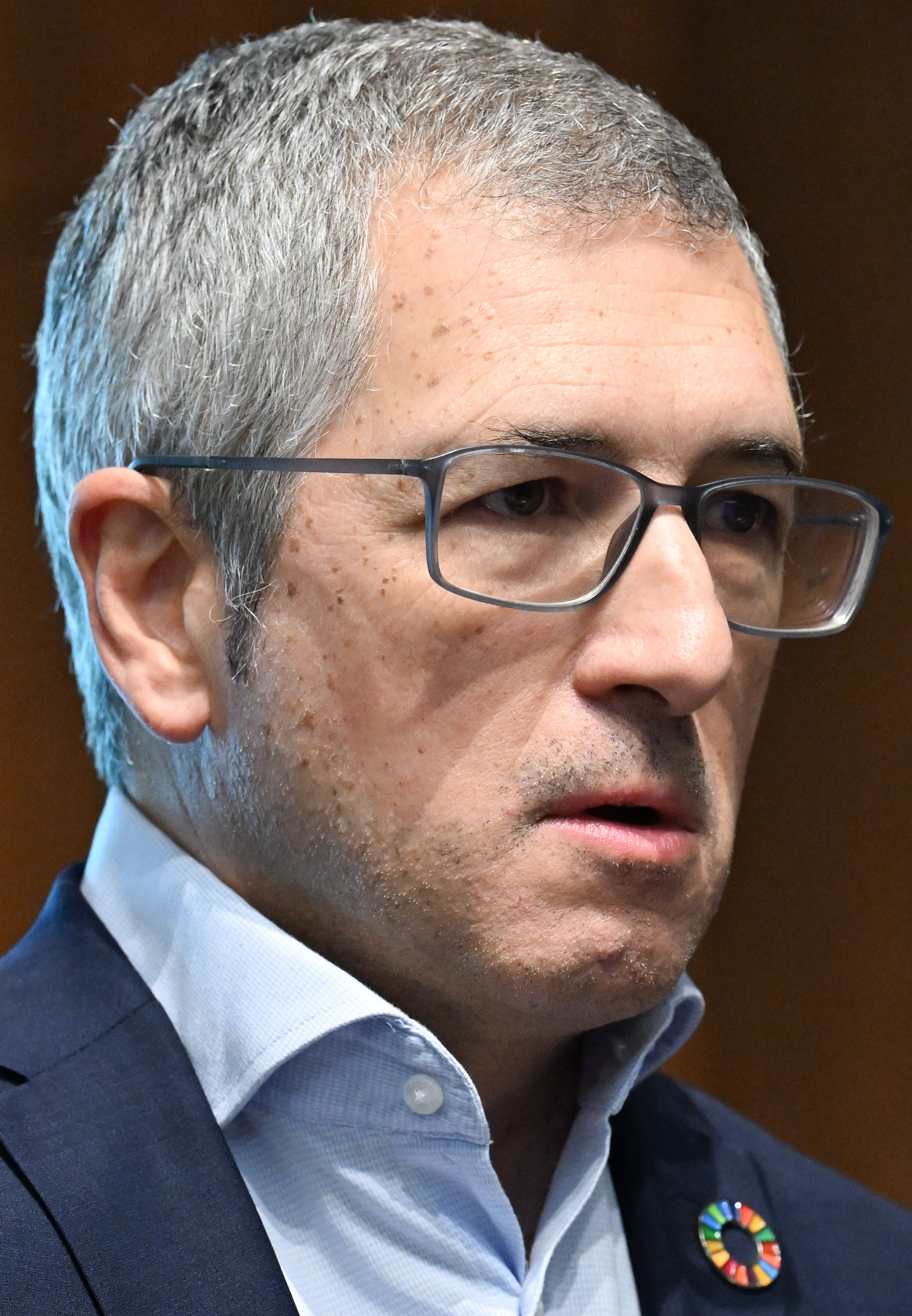
- Incumbent; Hugo Morán Fernández since 19 June 2018
- Ministry for the Ecological Transition and the Demographic Challenge; Secretariat of State for Environment
- Style: The Most Excellent (formal); Mr./Ms. Secretary of State (informal)
- Abbreviation: SEMA
- Member of: Government Delegated Committee for the Demographic Challenge
- Nominator: The Ecological Transition Minister
- Appointer: The Monarch
- Formation: April 21, 1991; 35 years ago
- First holder: Vicente Albero
- Website: miteco.gob.es

The secretary of state for environment is a senior minister of the Spanish Ministry for the Ecological Transition and the Demographic Challenge responsible for assisting the minister in the design and implementation of the government policies on climate change, water resources and the environment.

As the highest-ranking official responsible for these responsibilities, the secretary of state serves as ex officio president of the National Parks Autonomous Agency and the State Meteorological Agency. He or she is appointed by the Monarch on the advice of the Minister for the Ecological Transition. Since 19 June 2018, Hugo Morán has served as secretary of state.

== History ==
In April 1991, the position of Secretary of State for Water Policies and the Environment was established within the Ministry of Public Works. The Secretariat was organized through a General Secretariat for Environment, the Directorate-General for Hydraulic Works—today known as Directorate-General for Water—, the National Geographic Institute and the meteorological agency. In August that year, the General Secretariat was abolished and it was structured through the directorates-general for Hydraulic Works, for Water Quality, for Coasts; for Environmental Policy and the aforementioned agencies.

In September 1993 this body assumed the housing policy, with the aim of unifying and thus enabling better coordination of urban land and housing policies with national and European environmental policies. According to Royal Decree 1671/1993, of September 24:

The relationship between environmental policy and housing, understood here in the broad sense of "human habitat", must be guided by environmental considerations relating to building standards, wastewater treatment, selective collection of urban waste, energy consumption in domestic heating, and the integration of natural spaces within the city. Therefore, housing policy cannot be limited to financing access to housing, whether for ownership or rental, but must instead constitute a fundamental element of a comprehensive urban ecology policy, in which the quality of construction and respect for the environment are promoted within the framework of urban development

— Jerónimo Saavedra, Royal Decree 1671/1993, of September 2024, Preamble, ninth paragraph

In May 1996, new prime minister José María Aznar created for the first time a Ministry of Environment and split the housing and environmental policies. Furthermore, environmental policies were also divided. On the one hand, a State Secretariat was created solely for the management of water and coastal policies, while the remaining nature conservation and environmental quality policies came under the direct authority of the minister, through the reinstated General Secretariat for Environment. The meteorological agency was placed under the authority of the under-secretary.

In 2001, the Spanish Office for Climate Change was established and in 2004, the General Secretariat for Environment is abolished again, splitting its powers between two new general secretariats: one for Territory and Biodiversity and another for Pollution Prevention and Climate Change.

In 2008, environmental responsibilities are transferred to the Ministry of Agriculture and a "Secretariat of State for Climate Change" is established. At this time, all these responsibilities were divided among this Secretariat of State, the Directorate-General for Natural Environment and Forest Policy of the General Secretariat for Rural Environment and the General Secretariat for the Sea.

In late 2011, the Secretariat of State for Environment was formally reestablished with its original powers—environment and water resources—, and since 2018 is part of the Ministry for the Ecological Transition.

== Organization ==
As of 2026, this is the current organization of the State Secretariat:

Secretariat of State Organization (2026)
Secretary of State	Cabinet (Chief of Staff)
Secretary of State	State Meteorological Agency
Directorate-General for Water	Deputy Directorate-General for Hydrological Planning
Directorate-General for Water	Deputy Directorate-General for Economic and Budgetary Programming and Management
Directorate-General for Water	Deputy Directorate-General for Public Water Domain and Infrastructure
Directorate-General for Water	Deputy Directorate-General for Water Protection and Risk Management
Directorate-General for Water	River Basin Authorities
Directorate-General for Water	Commonwealth of the Taibilla Canals
Spanish Office for Climate Change	Deputy Directorate-General for Climate Change Mitigation
Spanish Office for Climate Change	Deputy Directorate-General for Carbon Markets
Spanish Office for Climate Change	Deputy Directorate-General for Adaptation to Climate Change
Directorate-General for Environmental Quality and Evaluation	Deputy Directorate-General for Waste Management
Directorate-General for Environmental Quality and Evaluation	Deputy Directorate-General for Pollution Prevention
Directorate-General for Environmental Quality and Evaluation	Deputy Directorate-General for Environmental Assessment
Directorate-General for the Coast and the Sea	Deputy Directorate-General for Maritime-Terrestrial Public Domain
Directorate-General for the Coast and the Sea	Deputy Directorate-General for Coastal Protection
Directorate-General for the Coast and the Sea	Deputy Directorate-General for Sea Protection
Directorate-General for Biodiversity, Forests and Desertification	Deputy Directorate-General for Terrestrial and Marine Biodiversity
Directorate-General for Biodiversity, Forests and Desertification	Deputy Directorate-General for Forest Policy and Fight Against Desertification
Directorate-General for Biodiversity, Forests and Desertification	National Parks Autonomous Agency

== List of secretaries of state ==
Officeholder		Term			Government	
Officeholder		Start	End	Duration	Government	
1	Vicente Albero	6 May 1991	21 July 1993	2 years, 76 days	Felipe González	Juan Carlos I (1975–2014)
2	Cristina Narbona	28 September 1993	11 May 1996	2 years, 288 days	Felipe González	Juan Carlos I (1975–2014)
Responsibilities divided into several bodies of the Ministry of Environment						Juan Carlos I (1975–2014)
3	Teresa Ribera	22 April 2008	31 December 2011	3 years, 253 days	José Luis Rodríguez Zapatero	Juan Carlos I (1975–2014)
4	Federico Ramos de Armas	31 December 2011	20 June 2015	3 years, 171 days	Mariano Rajoy	Juan Carlos I (1975–2014)
4	Federico Ramos de Armas	31 December 2011	20 June 2015	3 years, 171 days	Mariano Rajoy	Felipe VI (2014-present)
5	Pablo Saavedra Inaraja	27 June 2015	24 December 2016	1 year, 187 days	Mariano Rajoy	Felipe VI (2014-present)
6	María García Rodríguez	24 December 2016	19 June 2018	1 year, 177 days	Mariano Rajoy	Felipe VI (2014-present)
7	Hugo Morán Fernández	19 June 2018	Incumbent	8 years, 80 days	Pedro Sánchez	Felipe VI (2014-present)
