= Ministry of Environment (Spain) =

Government ministry of Spain

Ministry for the Ecological Transition and the Demographic Challenge
- Ministerio para la Transición Ecológica y el Reto Demográfico

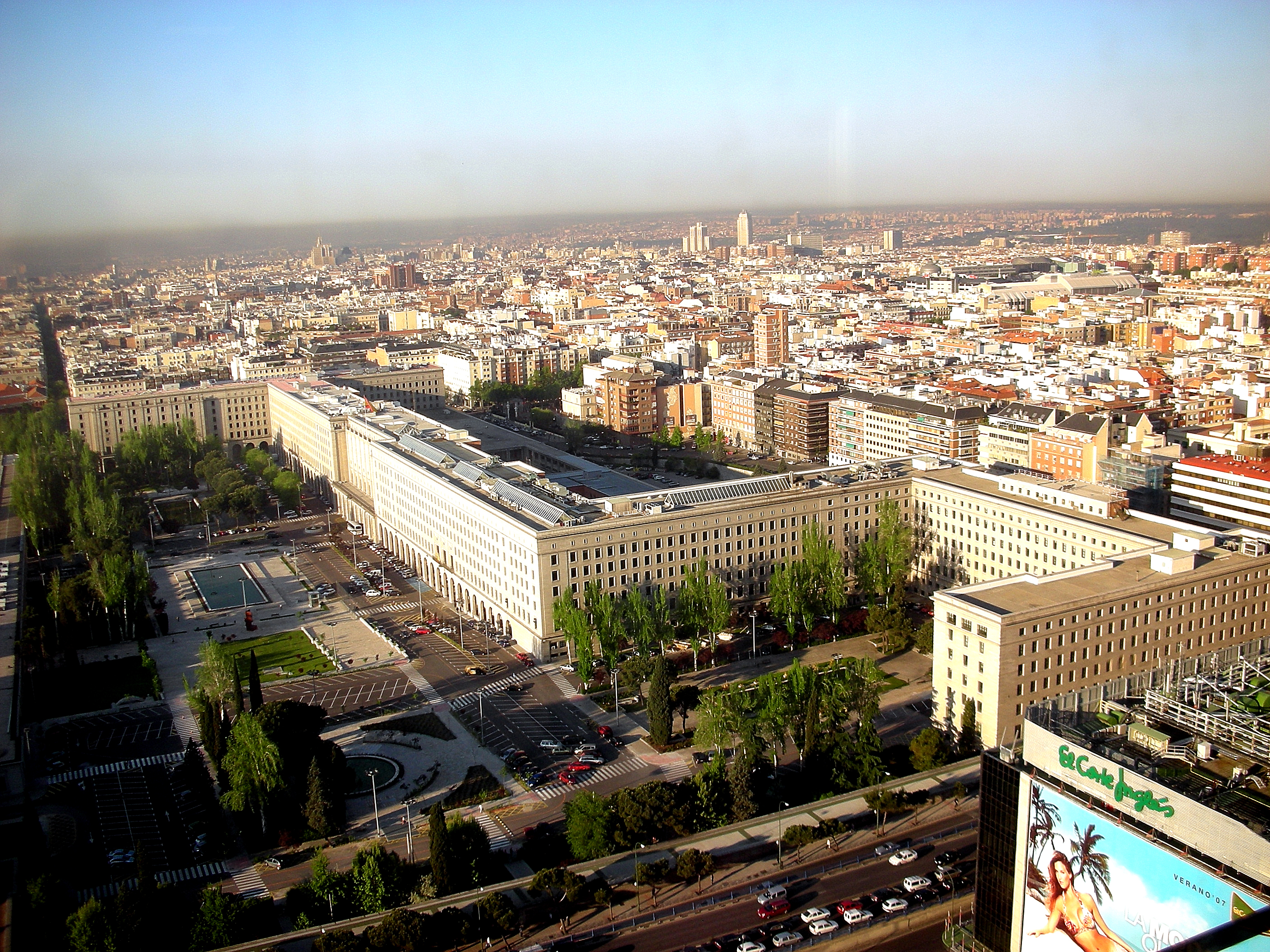
- The Ministry has its headquarters in the Nuevos Ministerios government complex.

Agency overview
- Formed: May 5, 1996; 30 years ago (as Ministry of Environment); June 7, 2018 (as Ministry for the Ecological Transition)
- Preceding agencies: Ministry of Public Works, Transport and Environment (before 1996); Ministry of Agriculture and Fisheries, Food and Environment (before 2018)
- Type: Ministry
- Jurisdiction: Spanish government
- Headquarters: Plaza de San Juan de la Cruz, s/n Madrid, Spain
- Employees: 6,129 (2019)
- Annual budget: € 8.9 billion, 2023
- Minister responsible: Sara Aagesen, Minister
- Agency executives: Joan Groizard Payeras, Secretary of State for Energy; Hugo Alfonso Morán, Secretary of State for Environment; Miguel Ángel González Suela, Under-Secretary
- Child agency: State Meteorological Agency
- Website: Ministry for the Ecological Transition (in Spanish)

The Ministry for the Ecological Transition and the Demographic Challenge (MITECO) is the department of the Government of Spain responsible for designing and implementing the government policy on fight against climate change, pollution prevention and protection of natural heritage, biodiversity, forests and sea. It is also responsible for the water and energy policies, as well as for overcoming the country's demographic challenges (population ageing, territorial depopulation, floating population effects, etc.).

In this sense, it corresponds to the MITECO the elaboration of the national legislation on waters and coasts, environment, climate change, meteorology and climatology; the management of the hydraulic public domain—all types of surface and groundwater—, of the maritime-terrestrial public domain—territorial waters, inland waters, natural resources of the exclusive economic zone and the continental shelf, as well as beaches and coasts—; the country's representation in the international organizations corresponding to these matters; as well as the coordination of actions, cooperation and agreement in the design and application of all policies that affect the scope of competences of the regions and the other public administrations, encouraging their participation through the cooperation bodies and instruments adequate.

Likewise, it corresponds to the Ministry the development of the national energy and mining policy, together with the measures aimed at ensuring the energy supply, guaranteeing a correct regulation of the sector and the analysis and monitoring of these markets, together with mining competencies, all within the framework of the ecological transition.

The MITECO is headed by the Ecological Transition Minister, who is appointed by the Monarch at request of the Prime Minister. The current minister is Sara Aagesen since November 2024.

== History ==
Environmental policies have been present in the Spanish administration for centuries, with regulations such as the Ordinances for the Conservation and Enhancement of the Navy's Forests and for the Enhancement and Conservation of Forests and Plantations (1748). When the Ministry of the Interior was created in 1812, it assumed responsibility for nature conservation, which was later transferred to the Ministry of Development in 1847, and in more recent times its responsibilities have been divided primarily between the ministries of Development and of Agriculture.

In 1833, the Directorate-General for Forests was created, the first administration dedicated to the conservation of nature. Also, by Royal Decree of 31 May 1837, it was established that "waste lands, crown lands, and lands of unknown ownership, as belonging to the nation as a whole, are administered by the Government", through the aforementioned directorate-general.

Subsequently, Water Laws were also passed in 1866 and 1879, canal and swamp laws in 1870, and the first River Basin Authorities (Spanish: Confederaciones Hidrográficas) were created in the 1920s.

From the 1970s onwards, the term "Environment" was incorporated into the Administration; first through an Interministerial Committee in 1971 for this matter, a Government Delegated Committee in 1972 and, later, through several government bodies, such as directorates-general, undersecretariats or, finally, in a ministerial department, such as the Ministry of Public Works, Transport and Environment in 1993.

=== The Ministry ===
Finally, in 1996, prime minister José María Aznar established the Ministry of the Environment, a department that unified all related responsibilities, namely:

- From the Ministry of Public Works, Transport and Environment, those related to environment that it exercised through the Secretariat of State for Environment and Housing, except housing.
- From the Ministry of Agriculture, Fisheries and Food, those regarding nature conservation and national parks.
- From the Ministry of Industry and Energy, those related to industrial environment.

At that time, there were three main problems: water use and quality, deforestation and wildfires, and desertification. To address these issues, the new Ministry designed a new National Hydrological Plan, reformed legislation on water, waste management, recycling, and the protection of endangered species, among other things, and the Kyoto Protocol was signed.

Also, in 2001 the Spanish Office for Climate Change was established, creating for the first time a government body for this issue. From 2008 to 2011, this competences had the rank of state secretariat.

==== Merger intro Ministry of Agriculture ====
In 2008, the environmental affairs were merged into the Ministry of Agriculture and it was renamed as "Ministry of Environment and Rural and Marine Affairs". Some agrarian associations, such as the Young Farmers' Agricultural Association (Asaja), rejected the rebranding of the Agriculture Ministry, considering that it was "to ignore two of the main challenges facing society today: agriculture and food" as well as "downplay the importance of the agricultural sector".

In 2011, it was renamed as Ministry of Agriculture, Food and Environment (2011–2016) and, later, as Ministry of Agriculture and Fisheries, Food and Environment (2016–2018).

==== Independence retrieved by the ministry ====
In 2018, with the arrival of Pedro Sánchez to the premiership, he regained the ministry's autonomy by creating a ministry focused on carrying out an energy transition towards more ecological means of production, the Ministry for the Ecological Transition. For this purpose Sánchez appointed Teresa Ribera as minister and her ministry assumed for the first time responsibilities on energy policy, a policy that historically belonged to the ministries of Industry or Economy.

In 2020, in order to improve the environmental policies that this department was doing, the Prime Minister promoted minister Ribera to the rank of Deputy Prime Minister and it trusted her the responsibilities on the different demographic challenges that Spain had.

== Organization ==
Organizational chart of the Ministry for Ecological Transition, May 2024

The minister for the ecological transition and demographic challenge is the most senior official of the Ministry. As such, the minister is responsible for appointing all the departmental officials and for establishing the department's general policy guidelines.

To exercise its powers, the minister is assisted by two secretaries of state, one for energy affairs and other for environment and water policies, and an under-secretary, who helps the minister in the daily management of the ministry. Also, the minister has three special commissioners, with the rank of under-secretaries, to develop certain policies.

As of 2026, this is the organization of the Ministry:

Ministry Organization (2026)
Minister	Cabinet (Chief of Staff)
Minister	Commissioner for Renewable Energies, Hydrogen and Storage
Minister	Commissioner for the Water Cycle and Ecosystem Resto
Minister	Commissioner for the Circular Economy
Secretary of State for Energy	Directorate-General for Energy Policy and Mines
Secretary of State for Energy	Directorate-General for Energy Planning and Coordination
Secretary of State for Energy	Institute for Just Transition
Secretary of State for Energy	Institute for the Diversification and Saving of Energy
Secretary of State for Environment	Directorate-General for Water
Secretary of State for Environment	Spanish Office for Climate Change
Secretary of State for Environment	Directorate-General for Environmental Quality and Evaluation
Secretary of State for Environment	Directorate-General for Coast and Sea
Secretary of State for Environment	Directorate-General for Biodiversity, Forests and Desertification
Secretary of State for Environment	State Meteorological Agency
Secretary of State for Environment	National Parks Autonomous Agency
Secretary-General for the Demographic Challenge	Directorate-General for Depopulation Policies
Under-Secretary	Technical General Secretariat
Under-Secretary	Directorate-General for Services
Under-Secretary	Deputy Directorate-General for International Relations

== Budget ==
In millions of euros (€)
1. Energy policy 3,923.6 (44.3%)
2. Water policy 3,089.2 (34.9%)
3. Environmental policy 1,439.7 (16.2%)
4. Demographic challenges 296.6 (3.35%)
5. Administration and general services 113.2 (1.28%)

For fiscal year 2023, extended to 2026, the Ministry for the Ecological Transition and the Demographic Challenge has a consolidated budget of €8.9 billion. Of this amount, €7 billion are directly managed by the ministry's central services while €1.9 billion are managed by its agencies.

The budget can be divided into five main areas:

1. Energy policy (Programs 42AB, 42BC, 42GA, 42GB, 42HA, 42HB, 42HC, 42IA, 42JA, 42KD, 423N, 424M, 425A & 456N), which funds the energy transition policies of the government, including renewables, storage, hydrogen and energy policy development and regulation.
2. Water policy (45EA, 45EB, 45EC, 452A, 452M, 456A & 49EC), covering water resources management, quality and planning, as well as public works and rivers and other water natural areas restoration.
3. Environmental policy (45DA, 45DB, 45DC, 45DD, 45ED, 45LC, 45SA, 456B, 456C, 456D, 456M & 495B), which finances the nature protection and climate policies, including meteorological forecasting.
4. Demographic challenges (42BD & 456E), which funds the fight against demographic challenges, such us depopulation of rural areas.
5. Administration and general services (451O), covering the Ministry’s central services and administrative structure.

In addition, Programme 000X (“Internal Transfers and Disbursements”) is excluded from the analysis, as it consists of transfers between public sector entities and would otherwise lead to double counting and distort the overall budget.

=== Audit ===
The Ministry's accounts, as well as those of its agencies, are internally audited by the Office of the Comptroller General of the State (IGAE), through a Delegated Comptroller's Office within the Department itself. Externally, the Court of Auditors is responsible for auditing expenditures.

Likewise, the Congress of Deputies Committee on Ecological Transition and Demographic Challenge and the Senate Committees on Ecological Transition, and on Depopulation and Demographic Challenge, exercise political control over the accounts.

== List of officeholders ==
Office name:

- Ministry of Environment (1996–2008)
- Ministry for the Ecological Transition (2018–2020)
- Ministry for the Ecological Transition and the Demographic Challenge (2020–present)

Portrait	Name (Birth–Death)	Term of office			Party	Government	Prime Minister (Tenure)	Ref.
Portrait	Name (Birth–Death)	Took office	Left office	Duration	Party	Government	Prime Minister (Tenure)	Ref.
	Isabel Tocino (born 1949)	6 May 1996	28 April 2000	3 years and 358 days	PP	Aznar I	José María Aznar (1996–2004)	
	Jaume Matas (born 1956)	28 April 2000	3 March 2003	2 years and 309 days	PP	Aznar II	José María Aznar (1996–2004)	
	Elvira Rodríguez (born 1957)	3 March 2003	18 April 2004	1 year and 46 days	PP	Aznar II	José María Aznar (1996–2004)	
	Cristina Narbona (born 1951)	18 April 2004	14 April 2008	3 years and 362 days	PSOE	Zapatero I	José Luis; Rodríguez Zapatero (2004–2011)	
Office disestablished during this interval. (Note: The department's competences were transferred to the Ministry of Agriculture between 2008 and 2018.)
	Teresa Ribera (born 1969)	7 June 2018	13 January 2020	6 years and 171 days	PSOE	Sánchez I	Pedro Sánchez (2018–present)	
	Teresa Ribera (born 1969)	13 January 2020	21 November 2023	6 years and 171 days	PSOE	Sánchez II	Pedro Sánchez (2018–present)	
	Teresa Ribera (born 1969)	21 November 2023	25 November 2024	6 years and 171 days	PSOE	Sánchez III	Pedro Sánchez (2018–present)	
	Sara Aagesen (born 1976)	25 November 2024	Incumbent	1 year and 256 days	Independent	Sánchez III	Pedro Sánchez (2018–present)	
