= National Parks Autonomous Agency =

Spanish agency managing National Parks

- Organismo Autónomo de Parques Nacionales
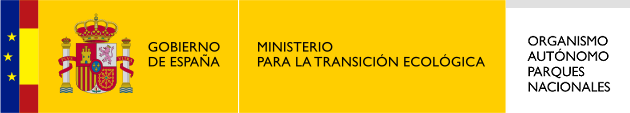

Agency overview
- Formed: June 23, 1995; 31 years ago
- Preceding agencies: Institute for the Conservation of Nature; National Institute for Agrarian Reform and Development
- Type: Autonomous agency
- Jurisdiction: Spanish government
- Headquarters: 59 Hernani Street; Madrid
- Agency executives: Hugo Morán, President (Secretary of State); Javier Pantoja Trigueros, Director
- Parent department: Ministry for the Ecological Transition
- Website: Web Site(in Spanish)

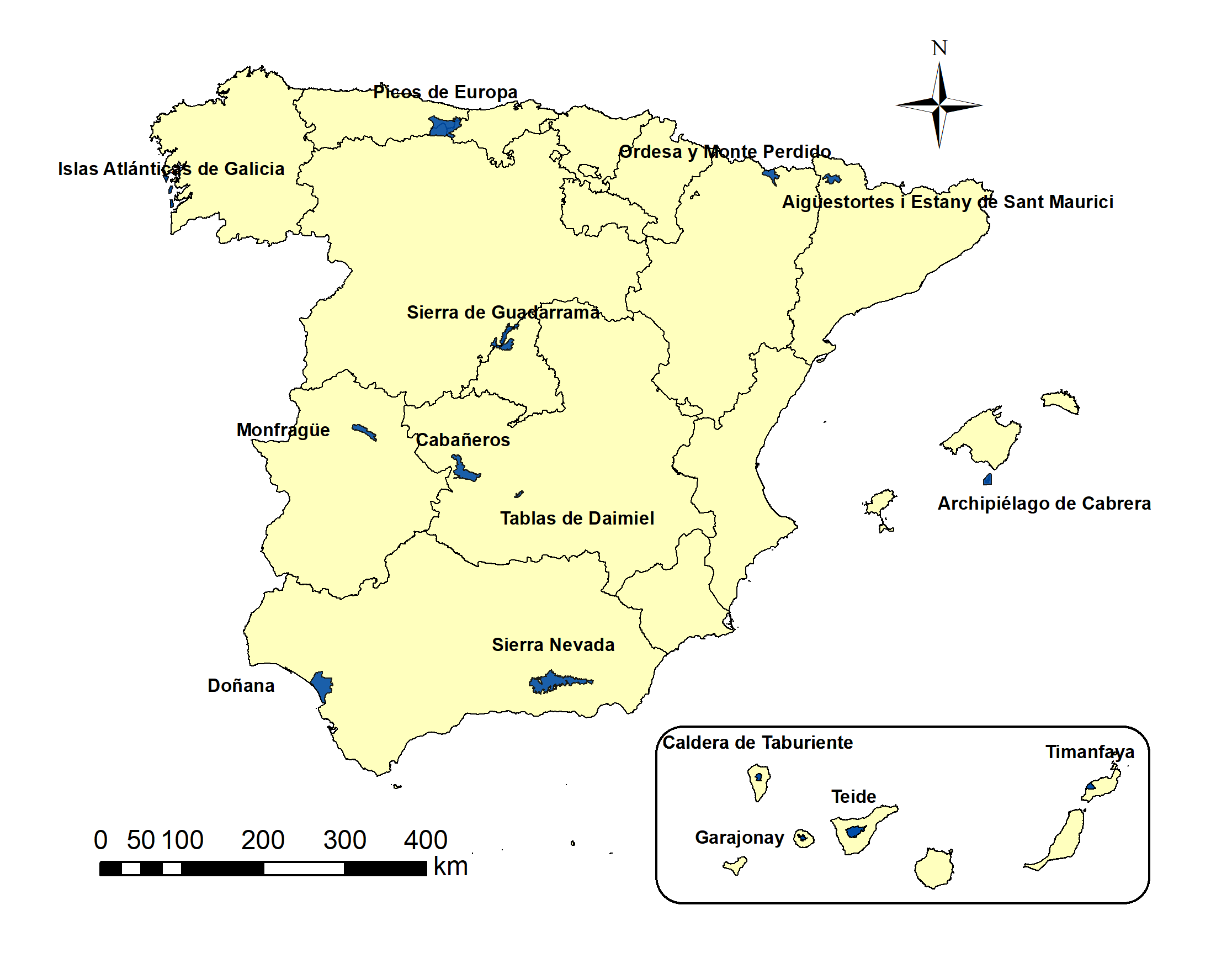
The fifteen current National Parks.

The National Parks Autonomous Agency (OAPN) is an autonomous agency of the Spanish central government that manages the National Parks Network and the Spanish Biosphere Reserves Network, as well as mountains, farms and other patrimonial assets of its property. The agency was created on June 23, 1995 by the Agriculture Minister Luis María Atienza by merging two other agencies, the Institute for the Conservation of Nature (ICONA) and the National Institute for Agrarian Reform and Development (IRYDA).

The OAPN is an agency of the Spanish Ecological Transition Department. The Minister, the Secretary of State for Environment and the Director-General for Biodiversity, Forests and Desertification act as President, First Vice President and Second Vice President of the agency, respectively, although the chief executive of the agency is the Director. The current director is Javier Pantoja Trigueros, appointed on April 1, 2022.

== Powers ==
The National Parks Autonomous Agency is responsible for:

- The formulation of the national policy regarding national parks.
- The dissemination and promotion of the image, values, and conservation model of national parks abroad.
- The planning and management of the natural spaces of state competence.
- The management of the mountains, farms and other assets assigned or their ownership.
- The coordination and promotion of the Man and the Biosphere Programme of UNESCO, as well as the promotion, coordination and support of the Biosphere Reserve Network.
- The support to the Ecological Transition Department's policies regarding biodiversity, conservation and sustainable use of natural resources, conservation of fauna, flora, habitat and natural ecosystems in the terrestrial and marine environment. In this sense, it has the same responsibilities in the Department's policies on education, information, awareness, training and public participation on environmental issues through the National Center for Environmental Education (CENEAM).
- The provision to the public of information and documentation services specialized in protected areas, nature conservation, dissemination, communication and environmental education.
- The cooperation with public and private entities, both national (state, regional and local) and international, for the development of the previous functions.

== History ==
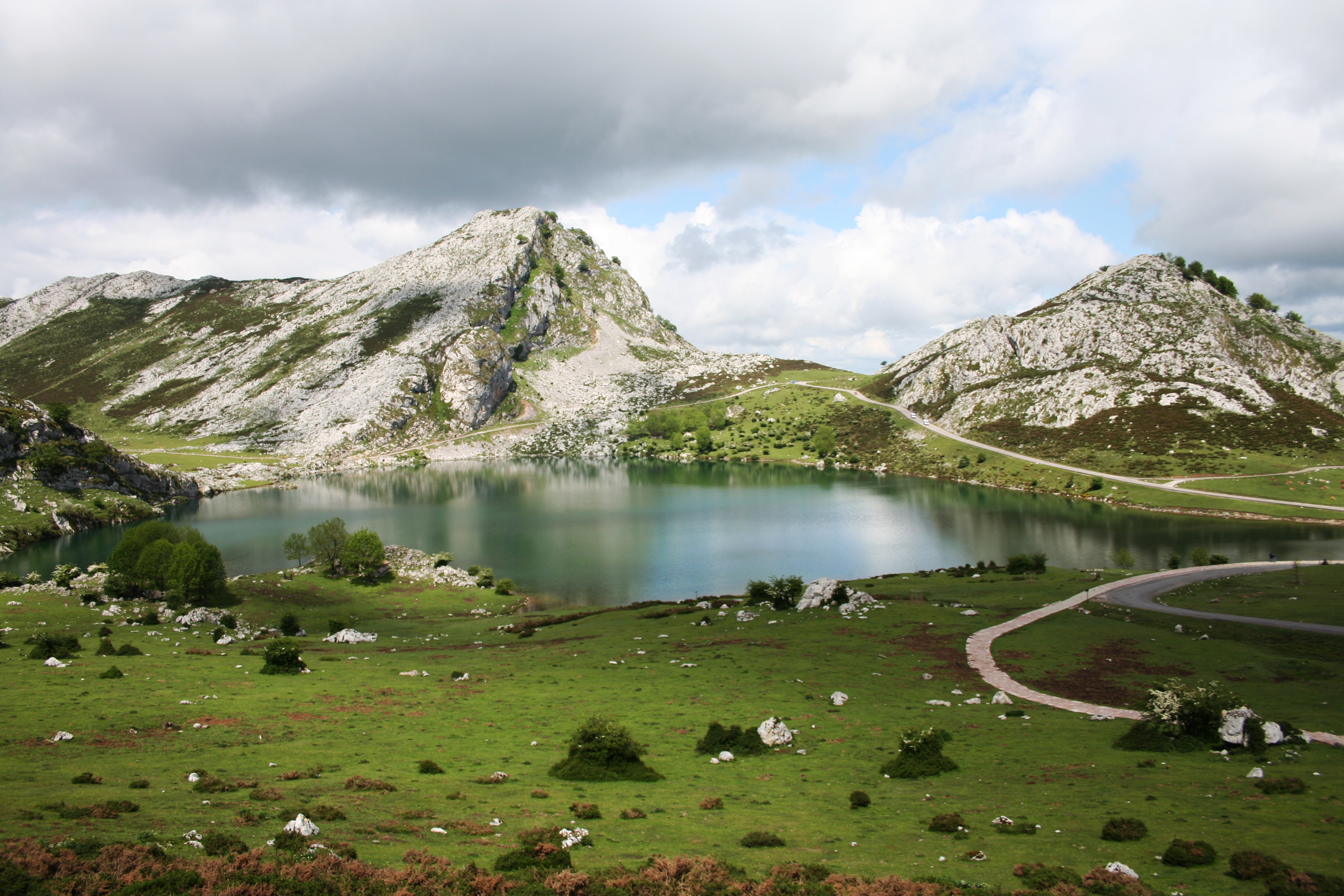
Enol Lake, in the Picos de Europa National Park.

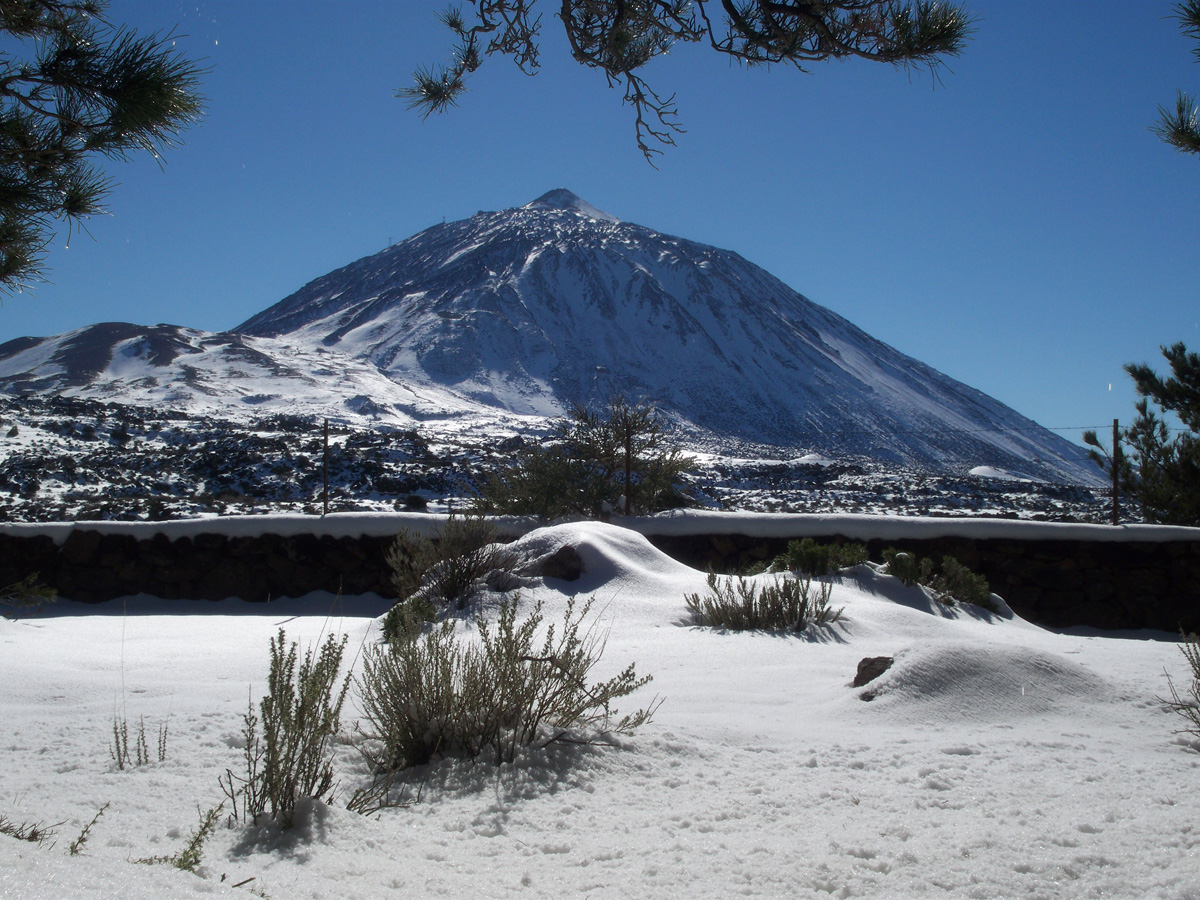
Teide National Park in Winter.

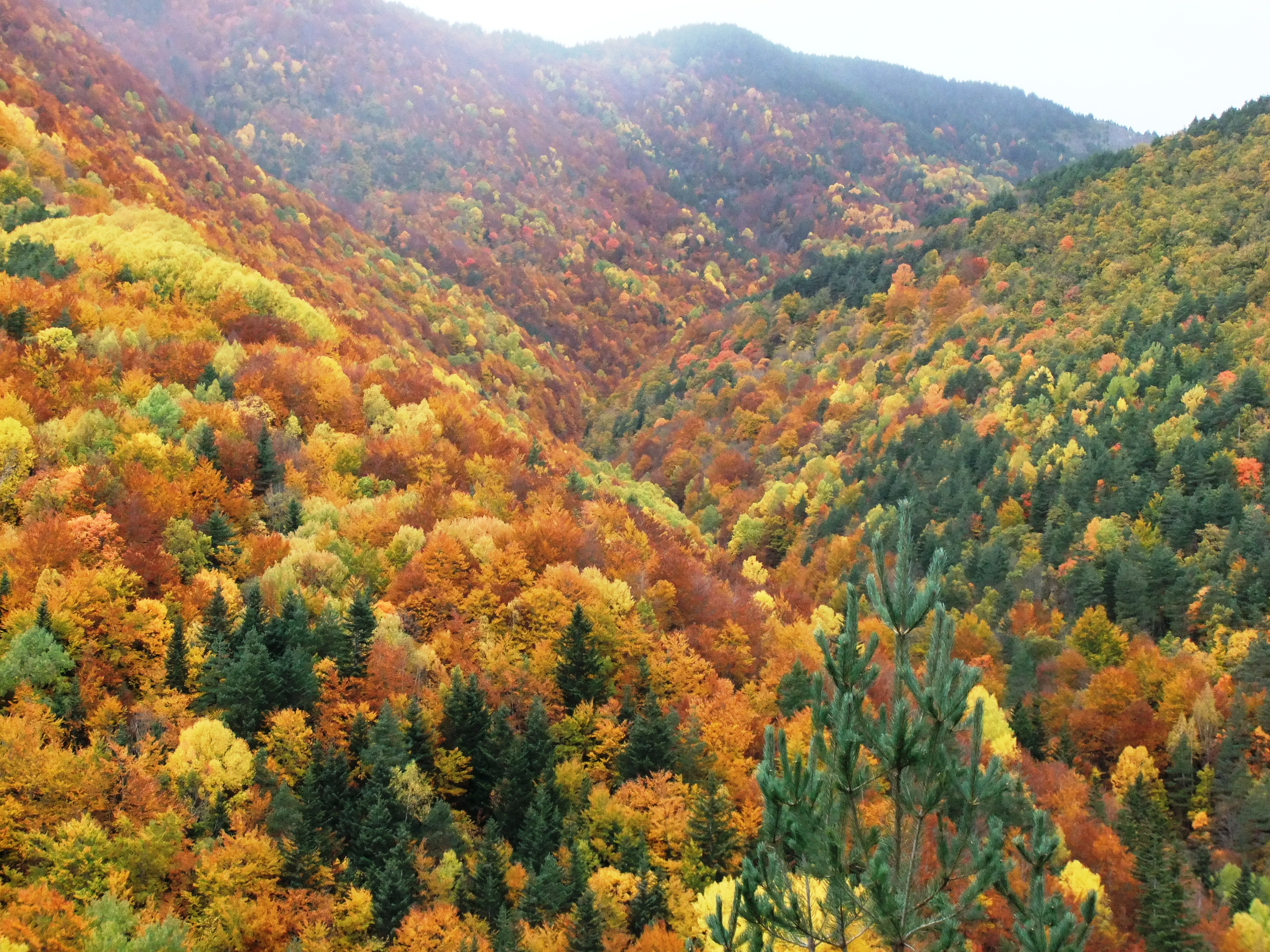
La Pardina del Señor Forest, in the Ordesa y Monte Perdido National Park.

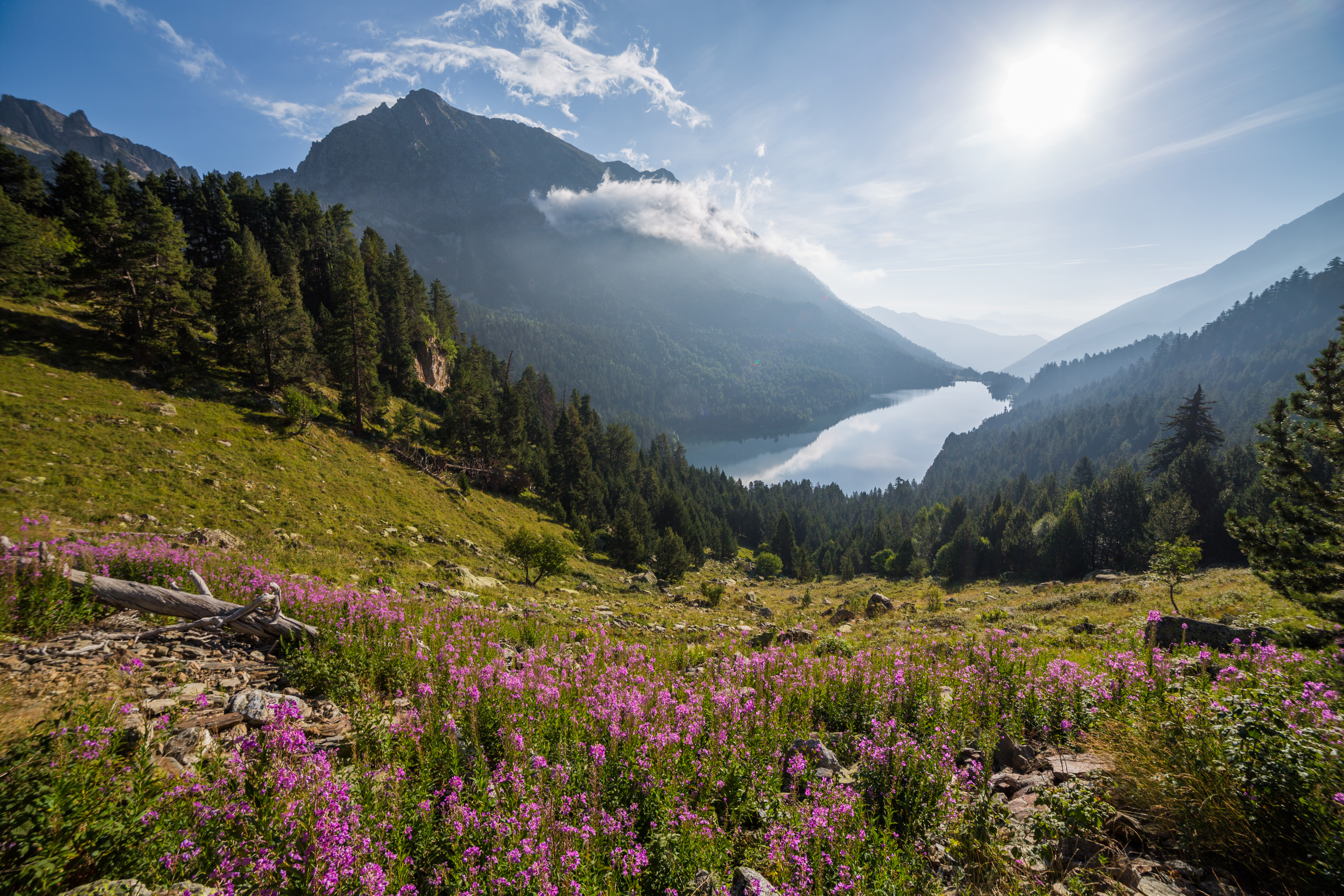
Sant Maurici Lake, Aiguas Tortas y Lago de San Mauricio National Park.

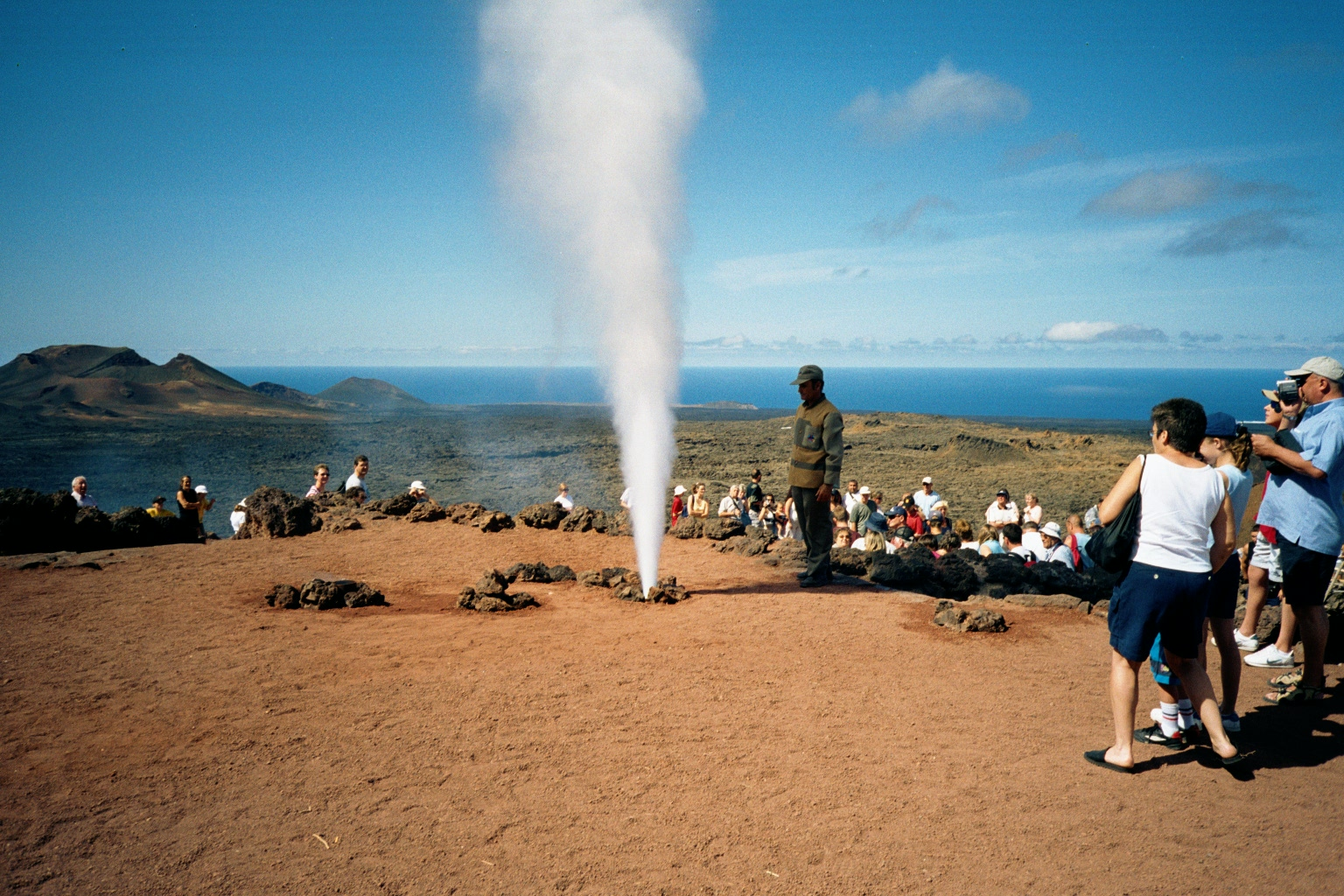
Water poured in a hole on top of the Timanfaya mountain, in Lanzarote, comes back as a small Geysir.

The first National Parks Act was passed on December 8, 1916. This law was one of the first in Europe dedicated to the protection of nature and it consisted in just three articles. The law, defined the national parks as "those exceptionally picturesque, forested or rugged sites or places of the national territory, which the State consecrates, declaring them such, with the sole purpose of favoring their access through adequate means of communication, and respecting and to ensure that the natural beauty of its landscapes, the richness of its fauna and its flora and the geological and hydrological participles that they enclose are respected, thus avoiding with the greatest efficiency any act of destruction, deterioration or disfigurement by the hand of the man". The first two national parks to be created were the Covadonga Mountain National Park (current Picos de Europa National Park) and the Ordesa Valley National Park (currently named Ordesa y Monte Perdido National Park).

From 1918 to 1954, the National Parks Network was integrated by those two parks. In 1954, two places of the Canary Islands were granted with the rank of national parks, the Teide National Park and the Caldera de Taburiente National Park. A year later, the Aiguas Tortas y Lago de San Mauricio National Park was created.

In 1957, a new Forestry Act was passed and it replaced the old Forestry Act of 1863 and also the National Parks Act of 1916. This new legislation also marks a substantial change in the legislative approach to environmental protection, according to which ecological factors begin to be more important when declaring new parks; in front of the merely historical and landscape. Years later, in 1969, Doñana is declared a National Park and, in 1973, the Tablas of Daimiel. A year later, a new national park is created in the Canary Islands, the Timanfaya National Park.

Other important year for the protection of the Spanish parks is 1975. The Protected Natural Spaces Act is passed which creates three new classifications of protected spaces —Integral Reserves of Scientific Interest, Natural Parks and Natural Parks of National Interest—, in addition to national parks. This law also brings with it the reclassification of several parks, with the notorious expansion of Doñana and Ordesa y Monte Perdido. In the beginning of the 80s, the Garajonay National Park is created, one of the best world representations of the laurel, relict vegetation of the Tertiary Era.

The Natural Spaces and Wild Flora and Fauna Conservation Act of 1989 gave a decisive push to the National Parks Network. This law officially creates the Network and it contained a clause where it is detailed which parks are part of it and their ecosystems. Finally, the law also assumes the right of every person to environment. Following the principles established by this law, in 1991 the Cabrera Archipelago Maritime-Terrestrial National Park is created and in 1995 the Covadonga National Park is extended integrating all the limestone landscape, creating the Picos de Europa National Park. Months later, the Cabañeros National Park is created and integrated into the Network.

During the following years after the approval of this law, there was discomfort among the regions because the law gave the exclusive power to the central government to manage the National Parks. Several regions —Andalusia, Aragón, Balearic Islands, Basque Country, Canary Islands, Cantabria, Castile and León and Catalonia— presented unconstitutionality appeals before the Constitutional Court against the law and other related regulations for this reason. In 1995, the Constitutional Court declared unconstitutional the fifth additional provision of the law and in 1997 the Spanish Parliament reformed the 1989 Act to establish a shared system of managing between the central government and the regions. On June 23, 1995, because of the devolution of powers to the regions, the Minister of Agriculture Luis María Atienza approved a royal decree merging two other agencies, the Institute for the Conservation of Nature (ICONA) and the National Institute for Agrarian Reform and Development (IRYDA) to create the current OAPN.

In 1999 a new national park was created, this time the Sierra Nevada National Park, and in 2002 the Atlantic Islands of Galicia National Park.

Another appeal of unconstitutionality is filed by the regions of Andalusia and Aragón against the 1998 Act. These two regions criticized the shared system. The Constitutional Court was forced to interpret the law and it established in 2004 that the shared system consisted on a day-to-day management by the regions (including the appointment of all the officials and the heads of the national parks) but this management must to be finance by the regional governments, and the superior supervision and coordination of the Network was granted to the central government by giving to it the authority to create or extend national parks and to establish the general guidelines of action.

In March 2007 the Monfragüe National Park was created and, a month later, the National Parks Network Act was passed. The National Parks Network Act of 2007 assumed the interpretation of the Constitutional Court and it granted the supervisory power to the Department of Environment, through its Autonomous Agency. The last national park to be created was the Sierra de Guadarrama National Park on June 25, 2013.

On December 3, 2014 it was approved the current National Parks Act. This law reinforces, for its singularity, the protection of those parks and it establish an improved coordination and support system with the central government. In this sense, the law established an emergency system against environmental disasters and it forbids activities such as sport and recreational fishing, sport and commercial hunting, logging for commercial purposes, as well as urbanization and building.

In June 2021, Spanish Parliament approved the Sierra de las Nieves National Park Act, a law that transformed the Sierra de las Nieves Natural Park into a national park.

== Directors ==
No.	Name	Term of office	
No.	Name	Start	End
1	Jesús Casas Grande	July 15, 1995	January 26, 1996
2	Antonio J. Troya Panduro	March 29, 1996	September 10, 1996
3	Alberto Ruiz del Portal Mateos	September 10, 1996	October 2, 1999
4	Basilio Rada Martínez	July 25, 2000	June 8, 2004
5	Juan Garay Zabala	July 30, 2004	June 5, 2009
6	José Jiménez García-Herrera	June 5, 2009	December 30, 2009
7	Olga Baniandrés	December 30, 2009	November 18, 2011
8	Basilio Rada Martínez	February 2012	July 19, 2018
9	Juan José Areces Maqueda	July 19, 2018	September 23, 2020
10	María Jesús Rodríguez de Sancho	September 23, 2020	April 1, 2022
11	Javier Pantoja Trigueros	April 1, 2022	Incumbent

== National Parks Network ==
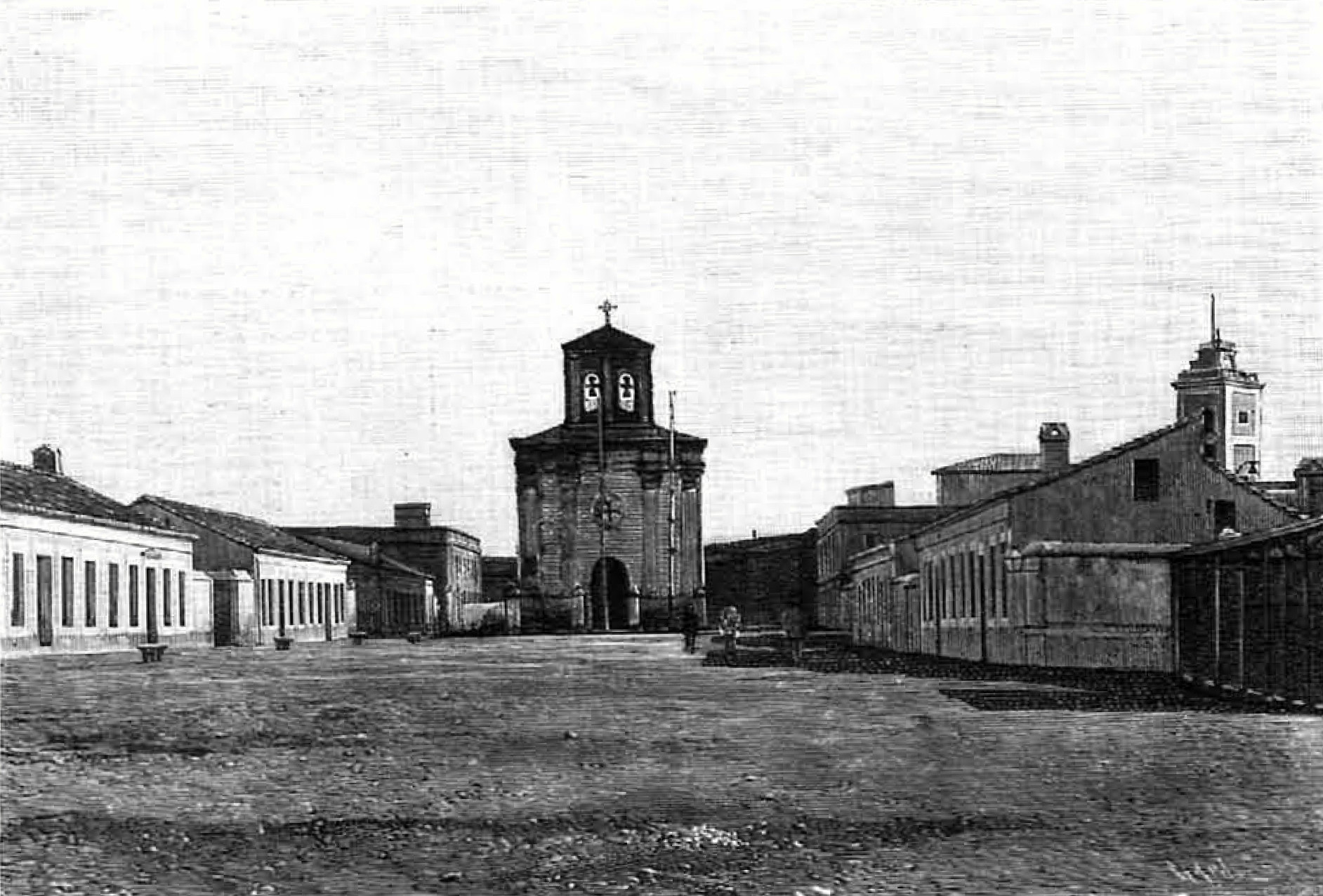
Church of la Purísima Concepción on the island of Isabel II (Chafarinas) in 1893.

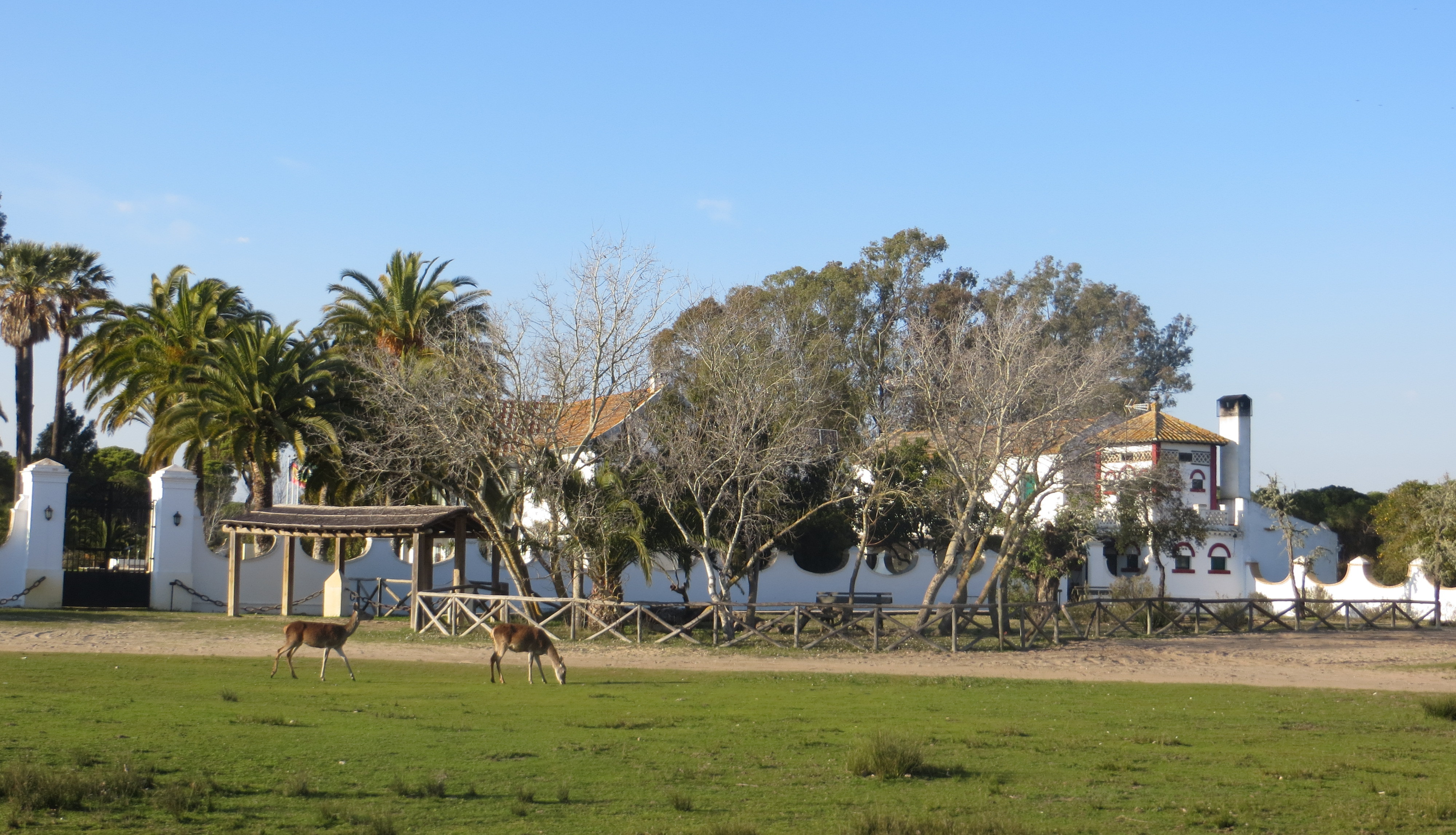
The Palace of Las Marismillas, vacation palace of the Spanish Prime Minister.

The National Parks Network (RPN) is a system established to protect and manage some Spanish Natural Heritage with the category of national park. The RPN is integrated by 16 national parks and all the staff and administrations that are part of it. The network encompasses approximately 1 million acres (4,450 km^{2}). The largest national park is the Sierra Nevada National Park with 212,222 acres (858,8 km^{2}) and it is surrounded by the Sierra Nevada Natural Park, that is approx. 200,000 acres. The smallest park is the Tablas de Daimiel National Park at 7,487 acres (30,3 km^{2}).

In addition to the national parks, that are directly managed by the Spanish regional administrations, the National Parks Autonomous Agency (OAPN) administers other properties. The OAPN administers 18 properties that encompasses 247,105.40 acres (1,000 km^{2} approx.). All these properties have in common the fact of being representative of some of the most emblematic landscapes and Iberian ecosystems. Most of these properties are owned by a public entity, although some of them are private (the Encomienda de Mudela is 99,97% private, La Graciosa is 7% private, New Place of Serradilla is 1,8% private).

OAPN's properties
Name	Province	Amount	
Valsaín Mountains and Sawmill	Segovia	26,253 acres	106,3 km^{2}
Chafarinas Islands	None	1,263 acres	5,1 km^{2}
Lugar Nuevo y Selladores-Contadero	Jaén	48,678 acres	197 km^{2}
Quintos de Mora	Toledo	16,961 acres	68.6 km^{2}
Encomienda de Mudela	Ciudad Real	42,737 acres	173 km^{2}
La Graciosa	Las Palmas	6645 acres	26.9 km^{2}
Río Guadarrama Nursery School	Madrid	12 acres	0,049 km^{2}
New Place of Serradilla	Cáceres	5,688 acres	23 km^{2}
Las Marismillas	Huelva	25,417 acres	102.8 km^{2}
Dehesa de Cotillas	Cuenca	5,383 acres	21.8 km^{2}
Dehesa de San Juan	Granada	9,590 acres	38.8 km^{2}
Zarza de Granadilla	Cáceres	16,662 acres	67.4 km^{2}
Ribavellosa	La Rioja	495.45 acres	2 km^{2}
Alfurí de Dalt	Menorca	633 acres	2.6 km^{2}
Cortijo de San Isidro	Madrid		
Las Cumbres del Realejo Bajo	Santa Cruz de Tenerife	1240 acres	5.02 km^{2}
Iserse y Graneritos	Santa Cruz de Tenerife	3976 acres	16.09 km^{2}
National Center for Environmental Education	Segovia		

=== Visitors ===
The National Parks Network reached the number of 10 million visitors in 2000 and 15 million in 2016, with its peak in 2024. The last data, from 2024, shows that the Network received 16 million visitors throughout the 16 parks. The most visited national park is the Teide National Park with 5.24 million visitors each year, followed by the Sierra de Guadarrama National Park with 2.40 million, the Picos de Europa National Park with 1.63 million and the Timanfaya with around 1.49 million. The less visited national parks are the Cabañeros National Park, the Cabrera Archipelago Maritime-Terrestrial National Park and the Sierra de las Nieves National Park, all of them with an average of 70,000 to 80,000 visitors.

Visitors data to the National Parks 1996-2024 (millions)
Ref:

=== Infrastructure and others ===
The national parks have, in general, all the necessary and sufficient provision of means for their proper functioning and development. In addition to the equipment and infrastructures for public use, all the national parks of the National Parks Network have at least one administrative office and a basic resource for their maintenance, surveillance and own monitoring (vehicles, forestry machinery, technical material, etc.).

The data about the material resources are very scarce and outdated, since the last official report dates from 2013. As of 2013, the 15 national parks had 32 visitors centers, 58 information centers, 121 parkings, 157 lookouts and 67 entertainment areas. Also, the vehicles fleet of the Network was 392 in 2013.

=== Staff ===
Between 1918 and 1997, the staff in charge of the national parks was part of the General State Administration. The Constitution of 1978 established a decentralized system and in 1997 most of the regions assumed the managements of the active national parks within its territories. As of 2015, the National Parks Network staff was integrated by 1,908 people. From those, 502 were firefighters and 426 surveillance and security.

== International affairs ==
=== World Heritage Sites ===
World Heritage Sites have enough universally recognized natural and cultural features that they are considered to merit the protection of all the peoples in the world. Spain is currently the third country with more World Heritage Sites, and the OAPN administers four of them:

- Garajonay National Park, Canary Islands.
- Doñana National Park, Andalusia.
- Pyrénées – Mont Perdu World Heritage Site, Aragón (shared with France)
- Teide National Park, Canary Islands.

=== UNESCO Biosphere Reserves ===
The OAPN also administers the Spanish Network of Biosphere Reserves (REBR). The REBR is integrated by the 52 Spanish biosphere reserves designated as such by the UNESCO. Spain has many more biosphere reserves, but this are specially protected and all of them coordinated and supported by an independent agency, the National Parks Autonomous Agency.

== Committees ==
The agency has two committees for a better coordination of the National Parks Network and to advise the agency.

=== National Parks Collaboration and Coordination Committee ===
Integrated in the General State Administration there is a National Parks Collaboration and Coordination Committee. This committee aims to deepen collaboration and coordination mechanisms, study possible common effects, reconcile the implementation of programs and actions in national parks, exchange information and experiences, and facilitate the dissemination of knowledge between the national parks administrations. The committee is chaired by the Director of the National Parks Agency and it is integrated by the administrators of the national parks, twelve representatives of the agency and the administrators of the centers and other properties of the agency. The Deputy Director of the agency is also a member of the committee and it is the deputy chair of it.

=== National Parks Scientific Committee ===
The Scientific Committee is the body of the OAPN in charge of scientifically advising on any question that may be raised from the Office of the Director of the Autonomous Agency, at the initiative of this or at the request of the national parks administrations. The Director and Deputy Director who are the chair and deputy chair, respectively, are part of the committee. In addition to these, the committee is also integrated by twenty members appointed by the director for a four-year term.
