= Vicente Lopez Ibor Mayor =

Spanish academic

Dr. Vicente Lopez-Ibor Mayor (born 20 March 1959) is a former commissioner of the National Energy Commission and of the National Electric System Commission, of Spain. He is a founding partner of Spanish energy law firm Estudio Juridico Internacional Lopez-Ibor Abogados (EJI). He is the chairman of Lightsource BP Ltd, the UK's largest solar energy generator, operating the largest portfolio of commercial scale solar photovoltaic assets on ground and roof in Britain. He was previously the general manager of Institutional Relations for Spain's major construction and Infrastructure firm, FCC Group.

As an academic, he has written numerous scholarly papers about energy security, law, and policy.

Mayor has a PhD in Law from Madrid University with the highest qualifications cum laude.

== Early life and education ==
Mayor was born in Madrid, Spain, in 1959. He started his studies at the Complutense University of Madrid, where he completed a bachelor's in Law. In 2004 he attended the IESE Business School, University of Navarra in Barcelona, Spain. In 2007 he participated in the IME program at the John F. Kennedy School of Government, Harvard University, Boston.

== Career ==
Mayor has worked extensively in the renewable energy sector. He has worked at UNESA for 12 years in various capacities. From 1987 to 1995 he was the director of Legal Affairs, as well as the chairman of the Legal Committee and chairman of the Public Procurement Law Committee. He was the general secretary of the board of directors from 1995 to 1999.

He has been a member of the Directors' Committee and of the Legal and Strategic Groups of EURELECTRIC (European Grouping of the Electricity Supply Industry) (made up of the CEOs from the main European electricity companies) and UNIPEDE (Union of International Producers and Distributors of Electrical Energy).

Mayor was a member of the Organizing Committee of the World Solar Summit and special advisor of the Energy Program of UNESCO (1989-1994).

He was an expert on the Energy Committee and on the Social and Economic Committee of the European Communities (1990-1992); Special Advisor of the Commissioner of Energy, Transports and Institutional Affairs of the European Commission (1994-1999); and a founding, ember of the European Council of Energy Regulators.

He was the general director of Fomento de Construcciones y Contratas, S.A., and a member of the Management Group Committee, with functional and organic dependence from the executive chairman of the company.

Mayor has a number of lead positions in various companies. He has been the president of Lightsource Renewable Energy Ltd, a UK based solar energy company, since 2011. He also is the president at an international law firm, Estudio Jurídico Internacional, that specializes in energy and public economy law.

Mayor is senior counsel at Olswang, and is also the president of the Spanish-North American Association VIA-Jefferson Circle of Spain, and member of the Board of Directors of the European Federation ENAM.

== Personal ==
Mayor is married with two children.

He speaks English, French, Italian, and his native language, Spanish.

== Publications ==
- “Enhanced cooperation and energy”. Institute for European Studies of CEU San Pablo University. Ed CEU. Madrid 2009.
- Energie et Société, in collaboration with Pierre Bauby, Alain Beltran, B. Berkovsky, T. Serber, M. Locquin and S.C. Mills. Publisud. París, 1995.
- Author of the book Conversations about Energy. Civitas-Thomson Reuters. 2012.

== Media ==
- "Energy needs a market without interference" Financial Times June 2008.
- "A Pan-Atlantic Vision of the Energy Renaissance" Bloomberg May 2014.
- "How Politics Is Shaping the Debate on Sustainable Energy in the US" The Huffington Post November 2014.
- "OPEC vs. Shale: The stakes are raised" Al Arabiya December 2014.
- "Can solar power replace oil in the Middle East?" Al Jazeera December 2014.
- "How TTIP Can Enhance EU-US Energy Security and Counterbalance Russia's Energy Weight" Atlantic Council December 2014.
- "Markets vs. Mandate: the American energy dilemma" Adam Smith Institute January 2015.
- "A new take on falling oil prices" Al Jazeera English February 2015.
- "Energy price controls have failed all over Europe" Institute of Economic Affairs March 2015.
- "Our energy future is green, renewable and decentralised" The Ecologist April 2015.
- "In a new bipolar energy order, America must assert itself in the Arctic" Atlantic Council April 2015.
- "The answer to our energy problems? The 'off the grid economy'" ResPublica May 2015.
- "Energy challenges mean the US must strengthen its Arctic engagement" American Security Project May 2015.
- "The Arctic Could Become a New Centre for Geopolitical Tensions" Huffington Post May 2015.
- "Energy's new centre of gravity: The Atlantic Basin" Business News Network June 2015.
- "Islamic Climate change declaration could be a game changer" Al Arabiya August 2015.
- "BBC Business Live" BBC News August 2015.
- "Living Planet: What's driving decarbonization?" Deutsche Welle December 2015.
- "Future of the energy market" CNN International December 2015.
- "Tensions with Russia make Turkey’s clean energy transition timelier than ever" Today's Zaman December 2015.
- "A renewable future for the Middle East" World Future Energy Summit January 2016.
- "The Islamic Declaration on Climate Change" Technical Review Middle East February 2016.
- "What The Middle East Must Do to Achieve Its Solar Ambitions" Newsweek March 2016.
- "Middle East’s Smart Cities" Newsweek June 2016.
- "You can't remove history overnight" CNBC August 2016.
