= State Meteorological Agency =

Meteorological agency of Spain

- Agencia Estatal de Meteorología

Agency overview
- Formed: August 18, 1887; 139 years ago
- Type: meteorological service
- Jurisdiction: Spain
- Headquarters: Madrid, Spain
- Employees: 1,083 (2023)
- Annual budget: € 133.8 million, 2023
- Agency executives: Hugo Morán, President (Secretary of State); Alicia López Rejas, CEO
- Parent agency: Ministry of Environment
- Website: www.aemet.es

The State Meteorological Agency (Spanish: Agencia Estatal de Meteorología, AEMET) is an agency of the Government of Spain responsible for providing weather forecast, warnings of hazardous weather and assisting the administrations in such matters. The AEMET is part of the Secretariat of State for Environment of the Ministry for the Ecological Transition and is headquartered in the University City, Madrid. The agency was known as Central Institute of Meteorology from 1887 to 1978 and National Institute of Meteorology from 1978 to 2008 when it adopted its current name.

The AEMET performs forecasting based on weather and climate modelling from data collected from its network of monitoring centers. The agency has centers distributed through the regions and it has offices in almost every airport and air force base. In addition, there are monitoring observatories spread throughout the Spanish geography.

It represents Spain in international meteorological institutions, such as the World Meteorological Organization (WMO), the European Organisation for the Exploitation of Meteorological Satellites (EUMETSAT) and the European Centre for Medium-Range Weather Forecasts (ECMWF).

== History ==
It was founded in 1887 as the "Instituto Central Meteorológico" by Royal Decree of August 12 and it was part of the Directorate-General for Public Instruction of the Ministry of Development. As stated in the founding Decree, the Institute had to "especially calculate and announce the probable weather to the ports and capitals of the province, without prejudice to the other scientific and practical work entrusted to it." The creation of the agency was promoted by the Development Minister Carlos Navarro Rodrigo and Francisco Giner de los Ríos, founder of the Institución Libre de Enseñanza, in an attempt to correct the country's delayed development of modern science. It was the first institution dedicated to the meteorological service in Spain. Its first director was the scientific Augusto Arcimís who remained in office until 1910. The first headquarters of the institute was the Castle building in the Retiro Park, Madrid.

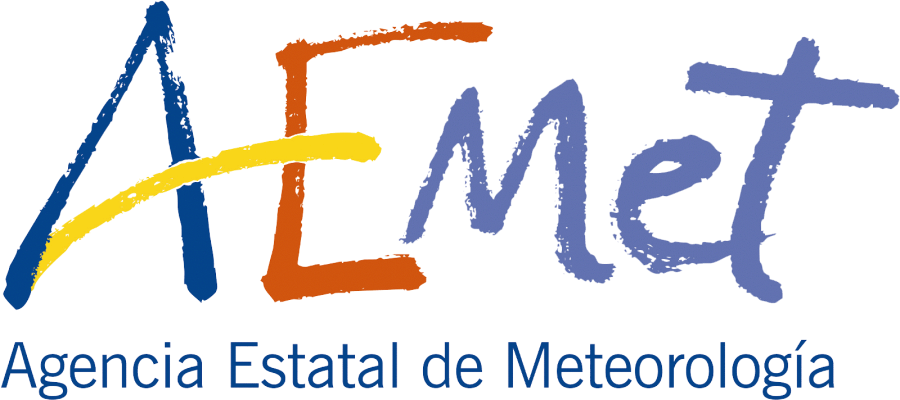
AEMET logo from 2008 to 2025

With different denominations this agency has been playing the role of "National Meteorological Service" since its creation. During the Second Republic, in 1933, it became dependent on the Directorate-General for Aeronautics of the Ministry of War. After the Civil War, in 1940, all the meteorological services were unified in the renowned "National Meteorological Service", which was attached to the Ministry of Air. In 1962 a new building was inaugurated in the University City of Madrid that in the 70s assumed the central services. The first woman appointed to the agency was Felisa Martín Bravo in 1933.

In the democratic period, a new restructuring took place in 1978, when it was renamed the National Institute of Meteorology (INM) and became dependent on the Ministry of Transport and Communications. The second and last restructuring of the agency happened in 2008, when the National Meteorological Institute was renamed State Meteorological Agency and it assumed all the goods and responsibilities of its predecessors.

In April 2026, the internal rules of the agency were modified. The presidency's powers were divided in two: the Secretary of State for Environment was designated ex officio president, with representative and government powers over the AEMET, while the executive powers were entrusted to a new position, the director.

== Activities and resources ==
AEMET's main task is "to develop, implement and provide meteorological services falling within the competences of the State, as well as to give support to other public and private activities which improve the safety and quality of life of the Spanish society".

Its activities include, among others, taking meteorological observations in Spain and archiving them, weather monitoring and forecasting, and doing scientific research in numerical weather prediction models.

To accomplish these tasks AEMET has at its disposal high computing power and an observation network, including staffed and automatic weather stations, radiosondes, weather radar and lightning detectors.

== Organization ==
The AEMET is organized through two types of bodies: government and executive. The government bodies are the President and the Governing Council, while the executive bodie of the Agency is the Director.

- The President, who is also the Secretary of State for Environment.
- The Governing Council, chaired by the president and integrated by representatives of the government departments.
- The Director, appointed by the Governing Council.
  - The Directorate for Meteorological Production and Applied Science.
    - The Department for Meteorological Production.
    - The Department for Applied Science and Climatology.
    - The Izaña Atmospheric Research Centre.
  - The Directorate for Technology and Infrastructure.
    - The Department for Observation and Infrastructure.
    - The Department for Information and Communication Technologies.
  - The Directorate for Strategy and Citizen Servicies.
  - The Directorate for Administration.
    - The Management Department.
  - The Department for Territorial Delegations Coordination.
