= Comisión Nacional de Energía (Spain) =

Spanish energy system regulator

The Comisión Nacional de la Energía (in short CNE and in English National Energy Commission) of Spain was the regulator of energy systems, created by Law 34/1998 of October 7, the hydrocarbons sector, and developed by Royal Decree 1339/1999 of 31 July, which adopted its regulation.

Its objectives were to ensure effective competition in energy systems and the objectivity and transparency of its operations for the benefit of all individuals who operate these systems and consumers. For this purpose, energy systems means the market power and Markets hydrocarbon s both liquid and gaseous (natural gas, oil...).

The CNE was closed in 2013 along with the Comisión del Mercado de las Telecomunicaciones (CMT), the Comisión Nacional de la Competencia (CNC) and the Comisión Nacional del Sector Postal (CNSP). These bodies were unified in the Comisión Nacional de los Mercados y de la Competencia (CNMC) in October 2013.

== Organization ==
The National Energy Commission is governed by a Board of Directors, composed of the President, Vice-President, six Directors and a Secretary, with voice but no vote. The President, Vice President and Directors are appointed by the Government of Spain, by Royal Decree on the proposal of Minister of Industry, for a term of six years, which could not be removed and may not be nominated by more than 2 terms (max 12).

The Council's current composition is:

- President: Maria Teresa Costa Campi
- Vice President: Fernando Marti Scharfhausen

Directors: Maria del Carmen Fernandez Rozado

- José Sierra López
- Pawn Francisco Javier Torre
- Luis Albentosa Puche
- Jorge Fabra Utray
- Jaime González González
- Sebastià Ruscalleda i Gallart

The president of the CNE, Maria Teresa Costa Campi, was secretary of Industry and Energy of the Generalitat of Catalonia, as well as deputy for Barcelona in the last parliament by the PSC-PSOE.

Past presidents of the CNE were Pedro Meroño (PP) and Miguel Angel Fernandez Ordonez (PSOE), and former Chairman was Vicente Lopez Ibor Mayor.

== See also ==
- Agency for the Cooperation of Energy Regulators
- IDAE
- Ministry of Industry (Spain)
- Net metering
