= Vicente Albero =

Spanish politician and economist

Vicente Albero Silla (December 6, 1944, Valencia) is a Spanish politician and economist.

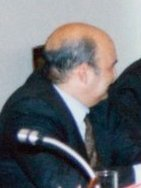
Vicente Albero

Albero graduated in Social Sciences and Economic Sciences from the Universidad Complutense de Madrid. He was a member of the Frente de Liberación Popular during the Francoist State. Later he joined the Partido Socialista Obrero Español (Socialist Worker's Party). He was elected to the Spanish Congress representing Valencia province for the PSOE in 1989, and was re-elected in 1993, although he resigned in 1994.

He served as Secretary of State for the Water Policies and Environment in 1991, from which he favored the creation of the National Council of Water, the Consejo Nacional del Agua which began the preparation of a National Hydrological Plan. In 1993 he was named Minister of Agriculture in Spain involved with agriculture, fishing and regulation a position that he occupied until May 1994.
