= Sara Aagesen =

Spanish politician and chemical engineer (born 1976)

The Most Excellent Sara Aagesen
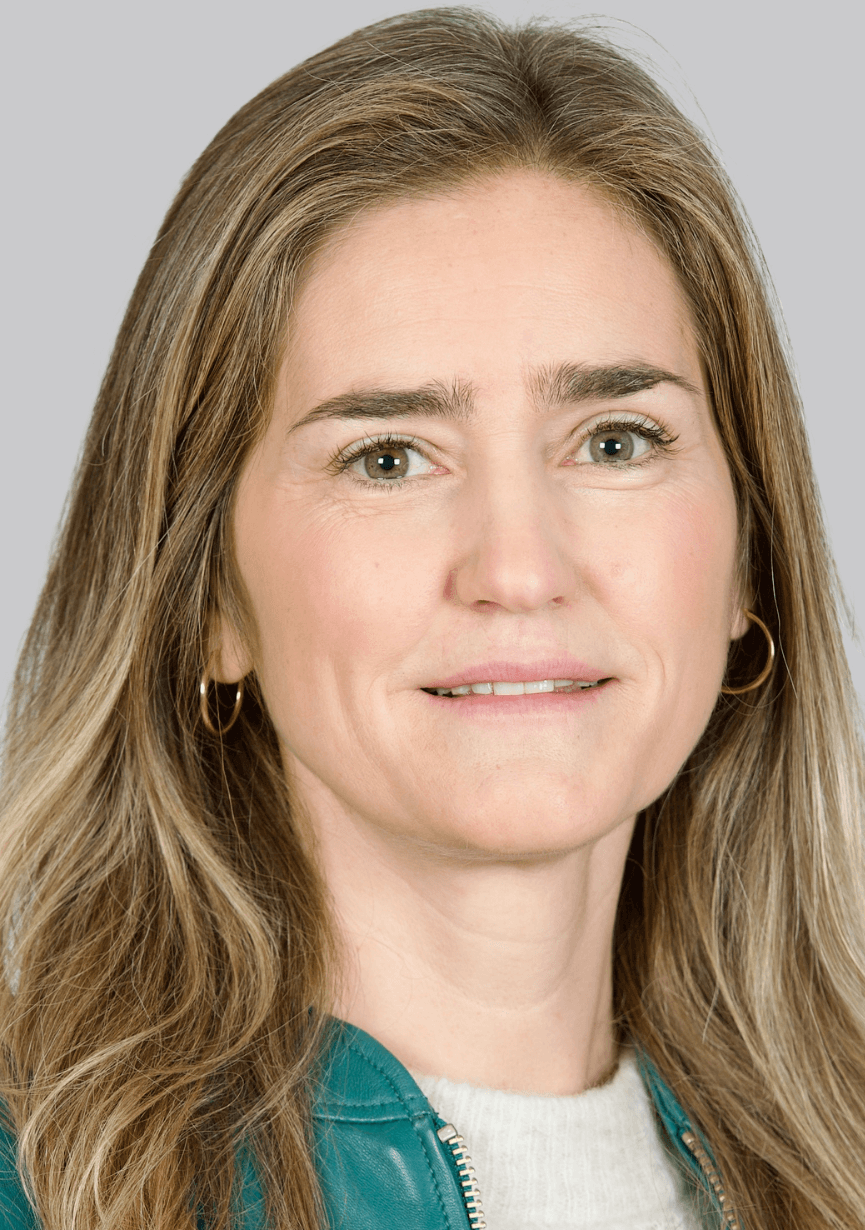
- Official portrait, 2024

Third Deputy Prime Minister of Spain
- Incumbent
- Assumed office 25 November 2024 Serving with Carlos Cuerpo and Yolanda Díaz
- Prime Minister: Pedro Sánchez
- Preceded by: Teresa Ribera

Minister for the Ecological Transition and the Demographic Challenge of Spain
- Incumbent
- Assumed office 25 November 2024
- Prime Minister: Pedro Sánchez
- Preceded by: Teresa Ribera

Secretary of State for Energy of Spain
- In office 17 January 2020 – 25 November 2024
- Prime Minister: Pedro Sánchez
- Preceded by: José Domínguez Abascal
- Succeeded by: Joan Groizard Payeras

Personal details
- Born: Sara Aagesen Muñoz; 1976 (age 49–50) Madrid, Spain
- Party: Independent
- Education: Complutense University of Madrid
- Occupation: Chemical engineer

Sara Aagesen Muñoz (born 1976) is a Spanish chemical engineer serving as Third Deputy Prime Minister and Minister for the Ecological Transition of Spain since 25 November 2024. She previously served as Secretary of State for Energy from 17 January 2020.

== Life ==
Born in Madrid to a Spanish mother and a Danish father, Sara Aagesen graduated as a chemical engineer at the Complutense University of Madrid, specializing in environment affairs.

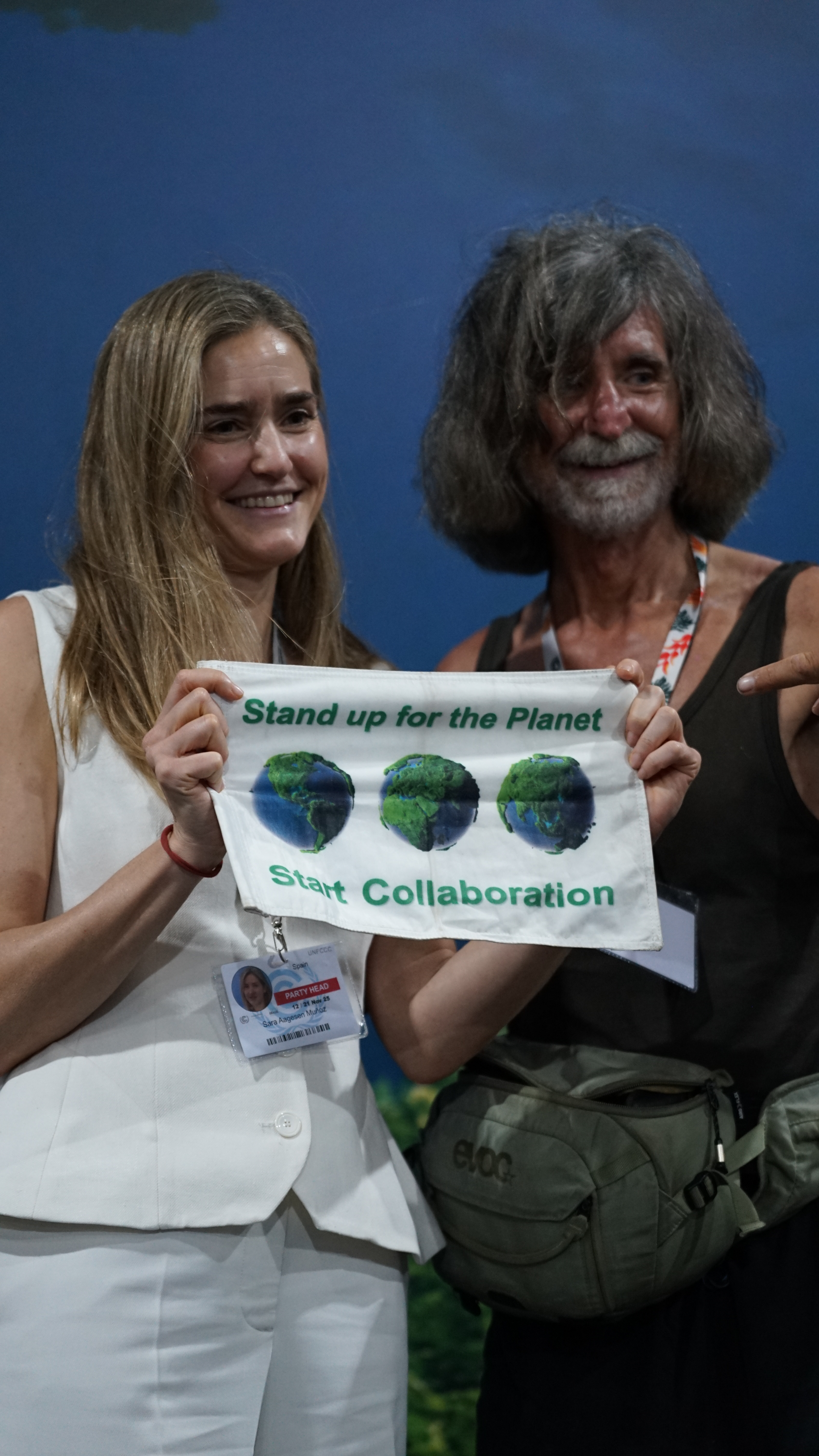
Aagesen at COP30 (2025)

In 2002, Aagesen joined the newly created Spanish Office for Climate Change (OECC), within the Ministry of Environment, where she focused her activity on climate action and the energy transition. Likewise, since that year she served as a negotiator for the Spanish delegation in the United Nations Framework Convention on Climate Change and is part of the Intergovernmental Panel on Climate Change (IPCC).

In June 2018, she was appointed Special Advisor to the Cabinet of the Minister of Ecological Transition, Teresa Ribera, where she directed, coordinated and defined the National Integrated Energy and Climate Plan 2021-2030 and the Long-Term Decarbonization Strategy 2050. The following year, in 2019, Aagesen represented Spain at the 2019 United Nations Climate Change Conference (COP25) held in Madrid.

On 17 January 2020, she was appointed Secretary of State for Energy, the second most important position in Ribera's department. From this position, Aagesen continued with energy transition policies, she managed energy policy during the COVID-19 pandemic and the Russian invasion of Ukraine, contributed to the approval of the "Iberian energy exception" and prepared the update of the National Integrated Energy and Climate Plan (2023–2030).

In November 2024, Aagesen was announced to become the Third Deputy Prime Minister and Minister for the Ecological Transition and the Demographic Challenge, replacing Teresa Ribera, something expected both by the press and the energy sector, who considered her the "natural candidate."

On 17 June she released the official analysis of 2025 Iberian Peninsula blackout. It pinned the proximate cause of the blackout to small outages concentrated in southern Spain setting off a chain reaction.

She is mother to two children, a boy and a girl.
