= Pedro Marín Uribe =

Spanish economist and professor

Pedro L. Marín Uribe is a Spanish economist and professor at the Universidad Carlos III of Madrid. Since April 2008 he assumed the role of Secretary of State for Energy of Spain.

== Education ==
Degree in Economics and Business, University of Valencia, 1988 and Master in Economics at the London School of Economics, 1991 where he also received a PhD in Economics in 1995.

== Career ==
In 1996 Marin was appointed to the position of Professor in the Department of Economics, Universidad Carlos III of Madrid. He later served as Dean of the Faculty of Social Sciences and Law, Deputy Dean for the Degree in Economics, Director of the Laboratory for Industrial Organization, Deputy Director of the Master in Industrial Economics and Head of Competition Policy at the University Institute of Law and Economics.

In May 2004 he was appointed General Director of the Department of Welfare Society at the Economic Bureau of the Prime Minister of Spain, from where he coordinated and supervised the micro-economic policy on health, environment, energy, industrial policy, R & D + i, competition policy, infrastructure, transport, agriculture and water.

In May 2008 the Minister of Industry, Tourism and Trade Miguel Sebastian announced Marin's appointment as General Secretary of Energy, with the objective to "continue the development of renewables, improving energy efficiency and ensure supply." In 2009, the General Secretariat was promoted to Secretary of State for Energy. From his position he directed the energy liberalization process in Spain, he promoted pioneering regulation for renewable energy and established binding targets for biofuels. In 2010 Marin chaired the Council of Energy during the Spanish Presidency of the European Union.

In June 2012, he joined the London office of The Brattle Group, a global economic consulting firm, as a principal.

== Academic work ==
Marin's analytical work includes studies on competition policy and market structure in regulated sectors such as energy, aviation and maritime transport, chemicals, tourism and pharmaceuticals as well as articles on research and development.

Marin has published its findings in several books and international journals including the Journal of Law and Economics, the Journal of Industrial Economics, the International Journal of Industrial Organization, Research Policy and Energy Policy.
