= Elvira Rodríguez =

Spanish economist and politician

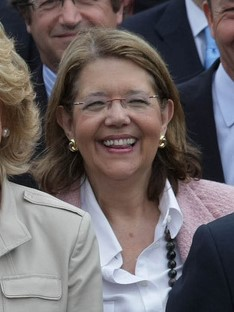

María Elvira Rodríguez Herrer (Madrid, 15 May 1949) is a Spanish economist and politician. She was the president of the National Securities Market Commission, a financial regulator, between 2012 and 2016.

Previously, as a member of the People's Party. she served in the Congress of Deputies and as minister of Environment in the second Aznar cabinet, as well as president of the Assembly of Madrid in the 8th term of the regional parliament. Rodríguez has held several other positions including:

- Director-General for Budget (1996–2000)
- Secretary of State for Budget and Expenditure (2000–2003)
- Minister of Environment (2003–2004)
- Deputy for Murcia in the Congress of Deputies (2004–2006)
- Regional Minister of Transport of the Community of Madrid (2006–2007)
- President of the Assembly of Madrid (2007–2011)
- Senator designated by the Assembly of Madrid (2011)
- Member of the Congress of Deputies (2011–2012)
- President of the National Securities Market Commission (2012–2016)

== Bibliography ==
- Montero, Luis Miguel (16 February 2016). El club de las puertas giratorias: De los escaños a la poltrona. Todos los privilegios de los políticos que pasan a la empresa privada... y viceversa (in Spanish). La Esfera de los Libros. ISBN 978-84-9060-624-7.
