= Climate of Bilbao =

Bilbao

Climate chart (precipitation, max. and min. temperature)
| J | F | M | A | M | J | J | A | S | O | N | D |
| 126 13 5 | 97 15 5 | 94 16 6 | 124 17 7 | 90 20 10 | 64 23 13 | 62 25 15 | 82 26 15 | 74 24 13 | 121 21 11 | 141 16 8 | 116 14 6 |
- █ Average max. and min. temperatures in °C
- █ Precipitation totals in mm
- Source: WMO
Imperial conversion
| J | F | M | A | M | J | J | A | S | O | N | D |
| 5 56 40 | 3.8 58 41 | 3.7 61 42 | 4.9 62 45 | 3.5 68 50 | 2.5 73 55 | 2.4 77 59 | 3.2 78 59 | 2.9 76 56 | 4.8 69 51 | 5.6 62 46 | 4.6 57 43 |
- █ Average max. and min. temperatures in °F
- █ Precipitation totals in inches

Bilbao and its metropolitan area has an oceanic climate according to the Köppen climate classification (Cfb) with mild winters and warm summers. According to the Troll-Paffen climate classification, Bilbao has a temperate climate and according to the Siegmund/Frankenberg climate classification, Bilbao has a subtropical climate. According to the European Environment Agency, Bilbao lies within the Atlantic biogeographical region. The climate of Bilbao and the rest of the north-western part of Spain (the so-called Green Spain) is different from the rest of the country, characterized by a higher amount of rainfall and precipitation days, fewer sunshine hours and mild temperatures, in summer comparable to northern half of Europe with temperate climate.

== Temperatures ==
| Yearly max temp | Yearly mean temp | Yearly min temp |
|---|---|---|
| 19.1 °C | 14.3 °C | 9.4 °C |

Said proximity to the ocean also makes that the two most defined seasons (summer and winter) remain mild, with low intensity thermal oscillations. Its average annual temperature is 19.1 °C during the day and 9.4 °C at night. In the coldest month – January, typically the temperature is around 13-14 °C during the day and 5 °C at night. In the warmest month – August, the typically temperature is around 25-26 °C during the day and about 15 °C at night.

== Precipitation ==
Bilbao has on average 128 precipitation days a year, therein average few to dozen rainy days per month (≥ 1 mm), ranging from 7 in July to 13 in January. The average annual precipitation is 1195 mm, ranging from 62 mm in July to 141 mm in November. This is one of the highest results in Spain, like the rest of Green Spain and Bay of Biscay area. In a comparison published by Umbrella Paris, the weather station selected for Bilbao recorded an average of 1,146 mm of precipitation per year from 1991 to 2020, about 2.7 times the average at Madrid–Retiro (418 mm). Precipitation in the region is abundant, and given the latitude and atmospheric dynamics, rainy days represent 45% and cloudy days 40% of the annual total.

Climate data for Bilbao (precipitation days – 1 mm)
| Month | Jan | Feb | Mar | Apr | May | Jun | Jul | Aug | Sep | Oct | Nov | Dec | Year |
|---|---|---|---|---|---|---|---|---|---|---|---|---|---|
| Average precipitation mm (inches) | 120 (4.7) | 86 (3.4) | 90 (3.5) | 107 (4.2) | 78 (3.1) | 60 (2.4) | 50 (2.0) | 76 (3.0) | 73 (2.9) | 111 (4.4) | 147 (5.8) | 122 (4.8) | 1,134 (44.6) |
| Average precipitation days (≥ 1 mm) | 13 | 11 | 11 | 13 | 11 | 7 | 7 | 8 | 8 | 11 | 13 | 12 | 124 |
Source: Agencia Estatal de Meteorología

Climate data for Bilbao (precipitation days – 0.1 mm)
| Month | Jan | Feb | Mar | Apr | May | Jun | Jul | Aug | Sep | Oct | Nov | Dec | Year |
|---|---|---|---|---|---|---|---|---|---|---|---|---|---|
| Average precipitation days (≥ 0.1 mm) | 16 | 15 | 15 | 17 | 16 | 12 | 11 | 12 | 12 | 14 | 15 | 16 | 171 |
Source: World Meteorological Organization

== Humidity ==
Average relative humidity is 72%, ranging from 70% in February and March to 74% in August and November.

Climate data for Bilbao
| Month | Jan | Feb | Mar | Apr | May | Jun | Jul | Aug | Sep | Oct | Nov | Dec | Year |
|---|---|---|---|---|---|---|---|---|---|---|---|---|---|
| Average relative humidity (%) | 72 | 69 | 68 | 69 | 69 | 70 | 71 | 72 | 71 | 71 | 73 | 72 | 70 |
Source: Agencia Estatal de Meteorología

== Snow ==
Snow is not frequent in the city, while it is possible to see snow on the top of the surrounding mountains. City recorded to few snow days per year. In February 1956 reported record: 7 of snow days in the month. Sleet is more frequent, about 10 days per year, mainly in the winter months.

Climate data for Bilbao
| Month | Jan | Feb | Mar | Apr | May | Jun | Jul | Aug | Sep | Oct | Nov | Dec | Year |
|---|---|---|---|---|---|---|---|---|---|---|---|---|---|
| Average snowy days | 0.7 | 0.7 | 0.3 | 0 | 0 | 0 | 0 | 0 | 0 | 0 | 0.1 | 0.3 | 2.2 |
Source: Agencia Estatal de Meteorología

== Daylight ==
Bilbao enjoys one of the most optimal number of hours of daylight in Europe. Days in winter are not as short as in the northern part of the continent, the average hours of daylight in December, January and February is 9.66 hours (for comparison: London or Moscow or Warsaw - about 8 hours).

Average hours of daylight
| Hours | Jan | Feb | Mar | Apr | May | Jun | Jul | Aug | Sep | Oct | Nov | Dec |
|---|---|---|---|---|---|---|---|---|---|---|---|---|
| Day | 9 | 11 | 12 | 13 | 15 | 15 | 15 | 14 | 12 | 11 | 10 | 9 |
| Twilight/Night | 15 | 13 | 12 | 11 | 9 | 9 | 9 | 10 | 12 | 13 | 14 | 15 |

== Sunshine ==
Sunshine duration is 1,640 hours per year, from 81 - average above 2.6 hours of sunshine at day in December to 186 - average above 6 hours of sunshine at day in July. This is similar result (range of 1,200-2,000 hours) which is recorded in the northern half of Europe, for example: London, Warsaw; but in winter Bilbao has about two times more sun duration than in the northern half of Europe. The city has up to two times less sunshine duration than other Spanish cities besides Green Spain area.

Climate data for Bilbao
| Month | Jan | Feb | Mar | Apr | May | Jun | Jul | Aug | Sep | Oct | Nov | Dec | Year |
|---|---|---|---|---|---|---|---|---|---|---|---|---|---|
| Mean monthly sunshine hours | 81 | 96 | 136 | 144 | 177 | 180 | 186 | 183 | 162 | 130 | 84 | 81 | 1,640 |
| Mean daily sunshine hours | 2.60 | 3.40 | 4.39 | 4.80 | 5.71 | 6.00 | 6.00 | 5.90 | 5.40 | 4.19 | 2.80 | 2.61 | 4.48 |
| Percentage possible sunshine | 28 | 32 | 36 | 36 | 38 | 39 | 40 | 43 | 43 | 38 | 29 | 28 | 36 |
Source: Agencia Estatal de Meteorología

== Temperature extremes ==
The highest temperature ever recorded during the day in the city centre is 42 °C on 26 July 1947. In the month of August 2003, the average reported daytime maximum temperature was a record 29.9 °C. In January, the highest temperature record held on 6 January 1999 of 23.4°C, beaten on 1 January 2022 with 24.4°C, which in turn was beaten on 1 January 2023 by 25.1°C. The coldest temperature ever recorded was -8.6 °C on the night of 3 February 1963.

Climate data for Bilbao airport, 1947-present
| Month | Jan | Feb | Mar | Apr | May | Jun | Jul | Aug | Sep | Oct | Nov | Dec | Year |
|---|---|---|---|---|---|---|---|---|---|---|---|---|---|
| Record high °C (°F) | 25.1 (77.2) | 27.1 (80.8) | 30.1 (86.2) | 33.1 (91.6) | 36.4 (97.5) | 41.2 (106.2) | 42.0 (107.6) | 44.0 (111.2) | 41.7 (107.1) | 36.7 (98.1) | 27.7 (81.9) | 25.2 (77.4) | 44.0 (111.2) |
| Record low °C (°F) | −7.6 (18.3) | −8.6 (16.5) | −5.0 (23.0) | −1.2 (29.8) | 0.4 (32.7) | 3.6 (38.5) | 6.6 (43.9) | 6.8 (44.2) | 3.8 (38.8) | 0.6 (33.1) | −6.2 (20.8) | −7.4 (18.7) | −8.6 (16.5) |
Source: Agencia Estatal de Meteorología

== Sea temperature ==
Average annual temperature of sea is about 16 °C. In February, the average sea temperature is 12 °C. In August, the average sea temperature is 21 °C. From July to September, average temperature of sea exceed 20 °C.

Average sea temperature:
| Jan | Feb | Mar | Apr | May | Jun | Jul | Aug | Sep | Oct | Nov | Dec | Year |
|---|---|---|---|---|---|---|---|---|---|---|---|---|
| 13 °C | 12 °C | 12 °C | 13 °C | 15 °C | 18 °C | 20 °C | 21 °C | 20 °C | 18 °C | 15 °C | 13 °C | 15.8 °C |

== Climatic data for Bilbao area ==
Climate data for Bilbao airport 1991–2020
| Month | Jan | Feb | Mar | Apr | May | Jun | Jul | Aug | Sep | Oct | Nov | Dec | Year |
|---|---|---|---|---|---|---|---|---|---|---|---|---|---|
| Mean daily maximum °C (°F) | 13.5 (56.3) | 14.2 (57.6) | 16.6 (61.9) | 18.1 (64.6) | 21.0 (69.8) | 23.5 (74.3) | 25.4 (77.7) | 26.3 (79.3) | 24.5 (76.1) | 21.5 (70.7) | 16.6 (61.9) | 14.1 (57.4) | 19.6 (67.3) |
| Daily mean °C (°F) | 9.5 (49.1) | 9.7 (49.5) | 11.6 (52.9) | 13.1 (55.6) | 16.0 (60.8) | 18.7 (65.7) | 20.6 (69.1) | 21.2 (70.2) | 19.2 (66.6) | 16.6 (61.9) | 12.5 (54.5) | 10.1 (50.2) | 14.9 (58.8) |
| Mean daily minimum °C (°F) | 5.3 (41.5) | 5.1 (41.2) | 6.7 (44.1) | 8.1 (46.6) | 11.0 (51.8) | 13.8 (56.8) | 15.8 (60.4) | 16.1 (61.0) | 13.9 (57.0) | 11.6 (52.9) | 8.3 (46.9) | 6.1 (43.0) | 10.2 (50.3) |
| Average precipitation mm (inches) | 130 (5.1) | 109 (4.3) | 98 (3.9) | 97 (3.8) | 76 (3.0) | 58 (2.3) | 52 (2.0) | 53 (2.1) | 75 (3.0) | 112 (4.4) | 171 (6.7) | 127 (5.0) | 1,158 (45.6) |
Source: Agencia Estatal de Meteorología

Climate data for Bilbao airport: 1981-2010
| Month | Jan | Feb | Mar | Apr | May | Jun | Jul | Aug | Sep | Oct | Nov | Dec | Year |
|---|---|---|---|---|---|---|---|---|---|---|---|---|---|
| Mean daily maximum °C (°F) | 13.4 (56.1) | 14.3 (57.7) | 16.5 (61.7) | 17.6 (63.7) | 20.8 (69.4) | 23.4 (74.1) | 25.4 (77.7) | 26.0 (78.8) | 24.6 (76.3) | 21.4 (70.5) | 16.6 (61.9) | 13.9 (57.0) | 19.5 (67.1) |
| Daily mean °C (°F) | 9.3 (48.7) | 9.7 (49.5) | 11.5 (52.7) | 12.6 (54.7) | 15.7 (60.3) | 18.4 (65.1) | 20.4 (68.7) | 20.9 (69.6) | 19.2 (66.6) | 16.4 (61.5) | 12.4 (54.3) | 9.9 (49.8) | 14.7 (58.5) |
| Mean daily minimum °C (°F) | 5.1 (41.2) | 5.1 (41.2) | 6.4 (43.5) | 7.6 (45.7) | 10.6 (51.1) | 13.4 (56.1) | 15.4 (59.7) | 15.7 (60.3) | 13.8 (56.8) | 11.4 (52.5) | 8.2 (46.8) | 5.9 (42.6) | 9.9 (49.8) |
| Average precipitation mm (inches) | 120 (4.7) | 86 (3.4) | 90 (3.5) | 107 (4.2) | 78 (3.1) | 60 (2.4) | 51 (2.0) | 77 (3.0) | 73 (2.9) | 111 (4.4) | 147 (5.8) | 122 (4.8) | 1,134 (44.6) |
| Average precipitation days | 13 | 11 | 11 | 13 | 11 | 7 | 7 | 8 | 8 | 11 | 13 | 12 | 124 |
| Average dew point °C (°F) | 5 (41) | 4 (39) | 6 (43) | 7 (45) | 11 (52) | 14 (57) | 16 (61) | 16 (61) | 14 (57) | 11 (52) | 8 (46) | 5 (41) | 10 (50) |
| Mean monthly sunshine hours | 85 | 97 | 132 | 138 | 169 | 181 | 186 | 179 | 160 | 127 | 88 | 78 | 1,610 |
Source 1: Agencia Estatal de Meteorología, Aena
Source 2: Time and date(Dew point 1985-2015)

Climate data for Bilbao Airport (1971–2000)
| Month | Jan | Feb | Mar | Apr | May | Jun | Jul | Aug | Sep | Oct | Nov | Dec | Year |
|---|---|---|---|---|---|---|---|---|---|---|---|---|---|
| Mean daily maximum °C (°F) | 13.2 (55.8) | 14.5 (58.1) | 15.9 (60.6) | 16.8 (62.2) | 20.1 (68.2) | 22.6 (72.7) | 25.2 (77.4) | 25.5 (77.9) | 24.4 (75.9) | 20.8 (69.4) | 16.4 (61.5) | 14.0 (57.2) | 19.1 (66.4) |
| Daily mean °C (°F) | 9.0 (48.2) | 9.8 (49.6) | 10.8 (51.4) | 11.9 (53.4) | 15.1 (59.2) | 17.6 (63.7) | 20.0 (68.0) | 20.3 (68.5) | 18.8 (65.8) | 15.8 (60.4) | 12.0 (53.6) | 10.0 (50.0) | 14.3 (57.7) |
| Mean daily minimum °C (°F) | 4.7 (40.5) | 5.1 (41.2) | 5.7 (42.3) | 7.1 (44.8) | 10.1 (50.2) | 12.6 (54.7) | 14.8 (58.6) | 15.2 (59.4) | 13.2 (55.8) | 10.8 (51.4) | 7.6 (45.7) | 6.0 (42.8) | 9.4 (48.9) |
| Average precipitation mm (inches) | 126 (5.0) | 97 (3.8) | 94 (3.7) | 124 (4.9) | 90 (3.5) | 64 (2.5) | 62 (2.4) | 82 (3.2) | 74 (2.9) | 121 (4.8) | 141 (5.6) | 116 (4.6) | 1,195 (47.0) |
| Average precipitation days | 13 | 11 | 11 | 13 | 12 | 8 | 7 | 8 | 9 | 11 | 12 | 12 | 128 |
| Mean monthly sunshine hours | 86 | 97 | 128 | 128 | 160 | 173 | 188 | 179 | 157 | 123 | 93 | 78 | 1,584 |
Source: Agencia Estatal de Meteorología

== See also ==
Climate in other places in Iberian Peninsula:

- Climate of Barcelona
- Climate of Valencia
- Climate of Madrid
- Climate of Lisbon
- Climate of Gibraltar
- Climate of Spain
