= Climate of Valencia =

Valencia

Climate chart (precipitation, max. and min. temperature)
J	F	M	A	M	J	J	A	S	O	N	D
39 17 8	30 17 8	40 19 10	33 21 12	36 24 15	26 28 19	7 30 22	15 31 23	70 28 19	63 25 16	52 20 11	48 17 8
- █ Average max. and min. temperatures in °C
- █ Precipitation totals in mm
- Source: Agencia Estatal de Meteorología
Imperial conversion
J	F	M	A	M	J	J	A	S	O	N	D
1.5 62 46	1.2 63 46	1.6 67 50	1.3 70 53	1.4 75 59	1 82 66	0.3 86 71	0.6 87 73	2.8 82 67	2.5 76 60	2 68 52	1.9 63 47
- █ Average max. and min. temperatures in °F
- █ Precipitation totals in inches

Valencia and its metropolitan area have a semi-arid climate (Köppen: BSh) bordering on a Mediterranean climate (Köppen: Csa) with mild winters and hot, dry summers. According to Troll-Paffen climate classification, Valencia has a warm-temperate subtropical climate (Warmgemäßigt-subtropisches Zonenklima) and according to Siegmund/Frankenberg climate classification, Valencia has a subtropical climate.

== Temperature ==
=== General ===
Yearly max temp	Yearly mean temp	Yearly min temp
23.0 °C (73.4 °F)	18.6 °C (65.5 °F)	14.2 °C (57.6 °F)

Its average annual temperature is 23.0 °C (73.4 °F) during the day and 14.2 °C (57.6 °F) at night. In the coldest month – January, typically the temperature ranges from 15 to 20 °C (59 to 68 °F) during the day and 6 to 10 °C (43 to 50 °F) at night. In the warmest month – August, the typical temperature ranges from 28 to 32 °C (82 to 90 °F) during the day and about 22 to 23 °C (72 to 73 °F) at night. Large fluctuations in temperature are rare.

=== Seasonal climate ===
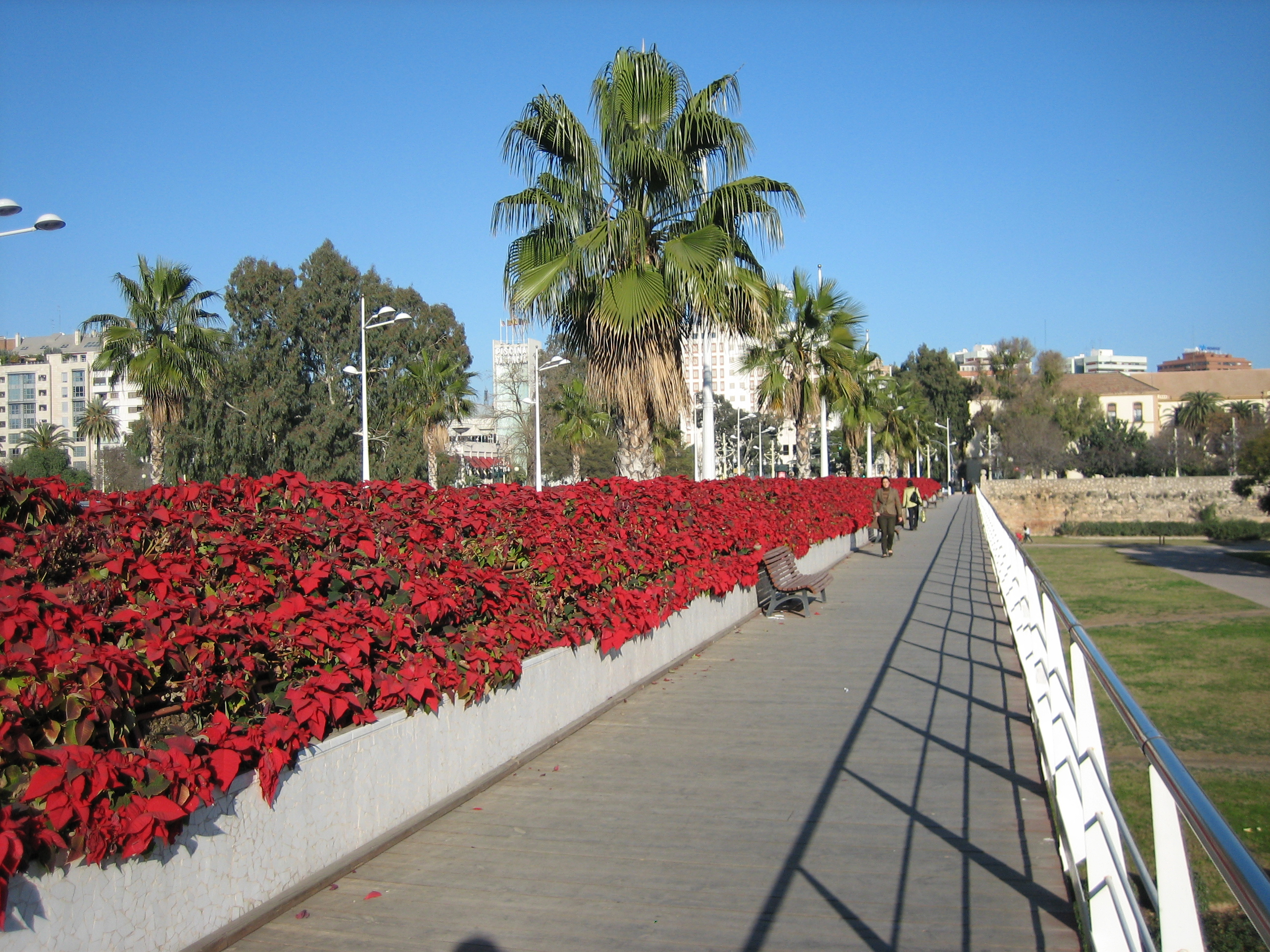
Winter in Valencia: very mild temperatures and mostly green flora.

==== Winter ====
Winters in Valencia are mild. December, January and February are the coldest months, with average temperatures around 17–18 °C (63–64 °F) during the day and 7–9 °C (45–48 °F) at night. From a few to a dozen days in the winter, the temperature exceeds 20 °C (68 °F).

March and November are transitional months, the temperature often exceeds 20 °C (68 °F), with average temperatures of around 20 °C (68 °F) during the day and 10 °C (50 °F) at night.

==== Summer ====
Summers in Valencia area are warm to hot (in the middle of summer). Regular temperatures above 20 °C (68 °F) begin as early as late March, although in this month the sea temperature is still cool: about 15–16 °C (59–61 °F). The summer season ends normally around early October, as this month can see sometimes high temperatures below 20 °C (68 °F) normally by the end of the month. The sea temperature in November remains mild - about 18 °C (64 °F).

July and August are the warmest months, with average temperatures around 30 °C (86 °F) during the day and 22 °C (72 °F) at night. In June and September the average temperature is around 26–28 °C (79–82 °F) during the day and 18–20 °C (64–68 °F) at night. In May and October the average temperature is around 24 °C (75 °F) during the day and 15–16 °C (59–61 °F) at night and in April and November the average temperature is around 20–21 °C (68–70 °F) during the day and 11–12 °C (52–54 °F) at night.

In the summer months, humidity levels tend to be high (just like in many other seaside cities), which makes the weather feel stuffy and sticky, increasing the heat index. This makes the 30 °C (86 °F) in Valencia may seem hotter than those in inland cities like Madrid or Córdoba. In July 2023, Valencia airport located in the suburbs recorded its highest average dew point temperature on record, with an average of 21.6 °C (70.9 °F), even exceeding 21.5 degrees, which were marked in 1987.

== Sunshine ==
Sunshine duration is 2,733 hours per year, from 158 - average about 5 hours of sunshine a day in December to 313 - average above 10 hours of sunshine a day in July. This is a bit above average for the southern half of Europe because in this part of the continent, sunshine duration varies from about 2,000 to about 3,000 hours per year. However, this is a 70% larger value than in the northern half of Europe, where sunshine duration is around 1500 hours per year. In winter Valencia has about three times more sun duration than in the northern half of Europe.

Climate data for Valencia sunshine values (1991-2020)
Month	Jan	Feb	Mar	Apr	May	Jun	Jul	Aug	Sep	Oct	Nov	Dec	Year
Mean monthly sunshine hours	174	181	217	237	267	282	313	288	237	208	171	158	2,733
Mean daily sunshine hours	5.61	6.46	7.00	7.90	8.61	9.40	10.10	9.29	7.90	6.71	5.70	5.09	7.48
Percentage possible sunshine	57	59	59	60	60	63	69	68	63	60	57	54	61
Source: Agencia Estatal de Meteorología (mean daily and monthly sunshine hours), climatemps.com (percent possible sunshine)

== Precipitation ==
Valencia has on average only 46 precipitation days a year, averaging several rainy days per month (≥ 1 mm), ranging from 1 in July to 5 in October. The average annual precipitation is less than 454 mm (17.87 inches), ranging from 9 mm (0.35 inch) in July to 74 mm (2.91 inch) in October.

Climate data for Valencia (precipitation days – 1 mm)
Month	Jan	Feb	Mar	Apr	May	Jun	Jul	Aug	Sep	Oct	Nov	Dec	Year
Average precipitation mm (inches)	36 (1.4)	32 (1.3)	35 (1.4)	37 (1.5)	34 (1.3)	23 (0.9)	9 (0.4)	19 (0.7)	51 (2.0)	74 (2.9)	51 (2.0)	52 (2.0)	454 (17.9)
Average precipitation days (≥ 1 mm)	4	3	4	5	5	3	1	2	4	5	4	5	44
Source: Agencia Estatal de Meteorología

Climate data for Valencia (precipitation days – 0.1 mm)
Month	Jan	Feb	Mar	Apr	May	Jun	Jul	Aug	Sep	Oct	Nov	Dec	Year
Average precipitation days (≥ 0.1 mm)	6	6	6	7	8	5	2	4	6	7	6	7	70
Source: World Meteorological Organization

== Humidity ==
Average relative humidity is 65%, ranging from 60% in April to 68% in August.

Climate data for Valencia
Month	Jan	Feb	Mar	Apr	May	Jun	Jul	Aug	Sep	Oct	Nov	Dec	Year
Average relative humidity (%)	63	61	61	60	65	65	66	68	67	66	65	65	65
Source: Agencia Estatal de Meteorología

== Daylight ==
Valencia enjoys one of the most optimal number of hours of daylight in Europe. Days in winter are not as short as in the northern part of the continent. The average hours of daylight in December, January and February is 10 hours (for comparison: London or Moscow or Warsaw - about 8 hours).

Average hours of daylight
Hours	Jan	Feb	Mar	Apr	May	Jun	Jul	Aug	Sep	Oct	Nov	Dec
Day	10	11	12	13	15	15	15	14	13	12	11	10
Twilight/Night	14	13	12	11	9	9	9	10	11	12	13	14

== Mean maximums and minimums ==
Climate data for Valencia (4km from sea, altitude: 11 m.a.s.l., 1981–2015, location)
Month	Jan	Feb	Mar	Apr	May	Jun	Jul	Aug	Sep	Oct	Nov	Dec	Year
Mean maximum °C (°F)	19.5 (67.1)	20.5 (68.9)	24.3 (75.7)	23.4 (74.1)	25.8 (78.4)	30.9 (87.6)	32.0 (89.6)	33.1 (91.6)	29.9 (85.8)	27.2 (81.0)	22.8 (73.0)	18.9 (66.0)	33.4 (92.1)
Mean minimum °C (°F)	4.3 (39.7)	5.1 (41.2)	7.0 (44.6)	9.8 (49.6)	11.0 (51.8)	15.8 (60.4)	19.0 (66.2)	20.0 (68.0)	17.2 (63.0)	13.1 (55.6)	8.5 (47.3)	5.8 (42.4)	4.3 (39.7)
Source: Agencia Estatal de Meteorología

== Temperature extremes ==
The highest temperature ever recorded during the day in the city centre is 44.7 °C (112.5 °F) on 10 August 2023, while at the airport, the highest temperature is 46.8 °C (116.2 °F), recorded the same day. In the month of August 2003, the average reported daytime maximum temperature was a record 33.1 °C (91.6 °F) (similar to a typical temperature in August of tropical Miami). The lowest temperature ever recorded was −7.2 °C (19.0 °F) on the night of 11 February 1956. Generally, February 1956 was the coldest month in the history of the city (since temperature recording).

Climate data for Valencia (4km from sea, altitude: 11 m.a.s.l., 1981–2018, location)
Month	Jan	Feb	Mar	Apr	May	Jun	Jul	Aug	Sep	Oct	Nov	Dec	Year
Record high °C (°F)	25.8 (78.4)	29.0 (84.2)	33.2 (91.8)	33.5 (92.3)	42.0 (107.6)	38.2 (100.8)	41.8 (107.2)	44.7 (112.5)	38.4 (101.1)	35.6 (96.1)	32.0 (89.6)	27.3 (81.1)	44.7 (112.5)
Record low °C (°F)	−2.6 (27.3)	−1.2 (29.8)	1.2 (34.2)	3.0 (37.4)	6.0 (42.8)	10.6 (51.1)	16.0 (60.8)	16.2 (61.2)	11.6 (52.9)	6.3 (43.3)	1.6 (34.9)	−0.3 (31.5)	−2.6 (27.3)
Source: Agencia Estatal de Meteorología

Climate data for Valencia (4km from sea, altitude: 11 m.a.s.l., 1934 - 2024 location)
Month	Jan	Feb	Mar	Apr	May	Jun	Jul	Aug	Sep	Oct	Nov	Dec	Year
Record high °C (°F)	26.2 (79.2)	29 (84)	33.2 (91.8)	35.2 (95.4)	42.0 (107.6)	38.2 (100.8)	41.8 (107.2)	43.0 (109.4)	38.4 (101.1)	35.8 (96.4)	32.0 (89.6)	27.3 (81.1)	43.0 (109.4)
Record low °C (°F)	−6.5 (20.3)	−7.2 (19.0)	−0.4 (31.3)	1 (34)	5 (41)	8.5 (47.3)	11.6 (52.9)	12.5 (54.5)	8 (46)	4.1 (39.4)	−0.8 (30.6)	−2.8 (27.0)	−7.2 (19.0)
Source: Agencia Estatal de Meteorología

Climate data for Valencia Airport - 8 km west of the city, inland, ~12km from the sea (elevation: 35 m) 1966 - 2024
Month	Jan	Feb	Mar	Apr	May	Jun	Jul	Aug	Sep	Oct	Nov	Dec	Year
Record high °C (°F)	26.0 (78.8)	29.4 (84.9)	32.6 (90.7)	34.8 (94.6)	42.6 (108.7)	38.2 (100.8)	43.4 (110.1)	46.8 (116.2)	38.0 (100.4)	35.8 (96.4)	31.5 (88.7)	27.7 (81.9)	46.8 (116.2)
Record low °C (°F)	−5.4 (22.3)	−3.1 (26.4)	−2.3 (27.9)	0.2 (32.4)	4.8 (40.6)	8.7 (47.7)	12.2 (54.0)	11.6 (52.9)	8.2 (46.8)	3 (37)	−3.1 (26.4)	−4.8 (23.4)	−5.4 (22.3)
Source: Agencia Estatal de Meteorología

== Sea temperature ==
The average annual temperature of the sea is about 18.5 °C (65.3 °F). In February, the average sea temperature is 13 °C (55 °F). In August, the average sea temperature is 26 °C (79 °F). From June to October, average temperature of sea exceed 21 °C (70 °F).

Average sea temperature, according to weather2travel.com:
Jan	Feb	Mar	Apr	May	Jun	Jul	Aug	Sep	Oct	Nov	Dec	Year
14 °C (57 °F)	13 °C (55 °F)	13 °C (55 °F)	15 °C (59 °F)	17 °C (63 °F)	21 °C (70 °F)	24 °C (75 °F)	26 °C (79 °F)	24 °C (75 °F)	21 °C (70 °F)	18 °C (64 °F)	15 °C (59 °F)	18.5 °C (65.3 °F)

Average sea temperature, according to seatemperature.org:
Jan	Feb	Mar	Apr	May	Jun	Jul	Aug	Sep	Oct	Nov	Dec	Year
14.2 °C (57.6 °F)	13.8 °C (56.8 °F)	14.1 °C (57.4 °F)	16.1 °C (61.0 °F)	18.8 °C (65.8 °F)	22.5 °C (72.5 °F)	24.8 °C (76.6 °F)	25.8 °C (78.4 °F)	24.6 °C (76.3 °F)	22.1 °C (71.8 °F)	19.1 °C (66.4 °F)	16.1 °C (61.0 °F)	19.3 °C (66.7 °F)

== Climatic data for Valencia area ==
Climate data for Valencia (normals 1991-2020), altitude: 11 m.a.s.l.
Month	Jan	Feb	Mar	Apr	May	Jun	Jul	Aug	Sep	Oct	Nov	Dec	Year
Record high °C (°F)	26.0 (78.8)	29.4 (84.9)	32.6 (90.7)	34.8 (94.6)	42.6 (108.7)	38.2 (100.8)	43.4 (110.1)	46.8 (116.2)	38.0 (100.4)	35.8 (96.4)	31.5 (88.7)	27.7 (81.9)	46.8 (116.2)
Mean maximum °C (°F)	19.5 (67.1)	20.5 (68.9)	24.3 (75.7)	23.4 (74.1)	25.8 (78.4)	30.9 (87.6)	32.0 (89.6)	33.1 (91.6)	29.9 (85.8)	27.2 (81.0)	22.8 (73.0)	18.9 (66.0)	33.4 (92.1)
Mean daily maximum °C (°F)	16.8 (62.2)	17.4 (63.3)	19.4 (66.9)	21.2 (70.2)	24.0 (75.2)	27.5 (81.5)	29.9 (85.8)	30.6 (87.1)	28.0 (82.4)	24.6 (76.3)	20.2 (68.4)	17.4 (63.3)	23.1 (73.6)
Daily mean °C (°F)	12.1 (53.8)	12.7 (54.9)	14.7 (58.5)	16.6 (61.9)	19.6 (67.3)	23.3 (73.9)	25.9 (78.6)	26.5 (79.7)	23.7 (74.7)	20.1 (68.2)	15.6 (60.1)	12.8 (55.0)	18.6 (65.6)
Mean daily minimum °C (°F)	7.5 (45.5)	8.0 (46.4)	9.9 (49.8)	11.9 (53.4)	15.1 (59.2)	19.0 (66.2)	21.9 (71.4)	22.5 (72.5)	19.3 (66.7)	15.6 (60.1)	11.0 (51.8)	8.3 (46.9)	14.2 (57.5)
Mean minimum °C (°F)	4.3 (39.7)	5.1 (41.2)	7.0 (44.6)	9.8 (49.6)	11.0 (51.8)	15.8 (60.4)	19.0 (66.2)	20.0 (68.0)	17.2 (63.0)	13.1 (55.6)	8.5 (47.3)	5.8 (42.4)	4.3 (39.7)
Record low °C (°F)	−6.5 (20.3)	−7.2 (19.0)	−0.4 (31.3)	1 (34)	5 (41)	8.5 (47.3)	11.6 (52.9)	12.5 (54.5)	8 (46)	4.1 (39.4)	−0.8 (30.6)	−2.8 (27.0)	−7.2 (19.0)
Average precipitation mm (inches)	39 (1.5)	30 (1.2)	40 (1.6)	33 (1.3)	36 (1.4)	26 (1.0)	7 (0.3)	15 (0.6)	70 (2.8)	63 (2.5)	52 (2.0)	48 (1.9)	459 (18.1)
Average snowfall cm (inches)	0.03 (0.012)	0.02 (0.008)	0.00 (0.000)	0.00 (0.000)	0.00 (0.000)	0.00 (0.000)	0.00 (0.000)	0.00 (0.000)	0.00 (0.000)	0.00 (0.000)	0.01 (0.004)	0.02 (0.008)	0.08 (0.032)
Average precipitation days (≥ 1mm)	3.9	3.5	4.1	4.5	4.2	2.2	1.2	2.3	5.2	4.7	4.3	4.3	44.4
Average snowy days	0.1	0.0	0.0	0.0	0.0	0.0	0.0	0.0	0.0	0.0	0.0	0.1	0.2
Average relative humidity (%)	65	64	64	62	66	66	68	68	67	68	66	66	66
Average dew point °C (°F)	5 (41)	6 (43)	8 (46)	11 (52)	14 (57)	18 (64)	21 (70)	22 (72)	19 (66)	15 (59)	10 (50)	7 (45)	13 (55)
Mean monthly sunshine hours	174	181	217	237	267	282	313	288	237	208	171	158	2,733
Percentage possible sunshine	57	59	59	60	60	63	69	68	63	60	57	54	61
Average ultraviolet index	2	3	5	6	8	9	10	9	7	5	3	2	6
Source: Agencia Estatal de Meteorología (AEMET OpenData)

Climate data for Valencia (4km from sea, altitude: 11 m.a.s.l., 1981–2010, location)
Month	Jan	Feb	Mar	Apr	May	Jun	Jul	Aug	Sep	Oct	Nov	Dec	Year
Mean maximum °C (°F)	19.5 (67.1)	20.5 (68.9)	24.3 (75.7)	23.4 (74.1)	25.8 (78.4)	30.9 (87.6)	32.0 (89.6)	33.1 (91.6)	29.9 (85.8)	27.2 (81.0)	22.8 (73.0)	18.9 (66.0)	33.4 (92.1)
Mean daily maximum °C (°F)	16.4 (61.5)	17.1 (62.8)	19.3 (66.7)	20.8 (69.4)	23.4 (74.1)	27.1 (80.8)	29.7 (85.5)	30.2 (86.4)	27.9 (82.2)	24.3 (75.7)	19.8 (67.6)	17.0 (62.6)	22.8 (73.0)
Daily mean °C (°F)	11.8 (53.2)	12.5 (54.5)	14.4 (57.9)	16.2 (61.2)	19.0 (66.2)	22.9 (73.2)	25.6 (78.1)	26.1 (79.0)	23.5 (74.3)	19.7 (67.5)	15.3 (59.5)	12.6 (54.7)	18.3 (64.9)
Mean daily minimum °C (°F)	7.1 (44.8)	7.8 (46.0)	9.6 (49.3)	11.5 (52.7)	14.6 (58.3)	18.6 (65.5)	21.5 (70.7)	21.9 (71.4)	19.1 (66.4)	15.2 (59.4)	10.8 (51.4)	8.1 (46.6)	13.8 (56.8)
Mean minimum °C (°F)	4.3 (39.7)	5.1 (41.2)	7.0 (44.6)	9.8 (49.6)	11.0 (51.8)	15.8 (60.4)	19.0 (66.2)	20.0 (68.0)	17.2 (63.0)	13.1 (55.6)	8.5 (47.3)	5.8 (42.4)	4.3 (39.7)
Average precipitation mm (inches)	37.0 (1.46)	36.0 (1.42)	33.0 (1.30)	38.0 (1.50)	39.0 (1.54)	22.0 (0.87)	8.0 (0.31)	20.0 (0.79)	70.0 (2.76)	77.0 (3.03)	47.0 (1.85)	48.0 (1.89)	475.0 (18.70)
Average precipitation days (≥ 1 mm)	4	4	4	5	4	3	1	2	5	5	4	5	46
Mean monthly sunshine hours	171	171	215	234	259	276	315	288	235	202	167	155	2,696
Source: Agencia Estatal de Meteorología

Climate data for Valencia (4km from sea, altitude: 11 m.a.s.l., 1971–2000, location)
Month	Jan	Feb	Mar	Apr	May	Jun	Jul	Aug	Sep	Oct	Nov	Dec	Year
Mean daily maximum °C (°F)	16.1 (61.0)	17.2 (63.0)	18.7 (65.7)	20.2 (68.4)	22.8 (73.0)	26.2 (79.2)	29.1 (84.4)	29.6 (85.3)	27.6 (81.7)	23.6 (74.5)	19.5 (67.1)	16.8 (62.2)	22.3 (72.1)
Daily mean °C (°F)	11.5 (52.7)	12.6 (54.7)	13.9 (57.0)	15.5 (59.9)	18.4 (65.1)	22.1 (71.8)	24.9 (76.8)	25.5 (77.9)	23.1 (73.6)	19.1 (66.4)	14.9 (58.8)	12.4 (54.3)	17.8 (64.0)
Mean daily minimum °C (°F)	7.0 (44.6)	7.9 (46.2)	9.0 (48.2)	10.8 (51.4)	14.1 (57.4)	17.9 (64.2)	20.8 (69.4)	21.4 (70.5)	18.6 (65.5)	14.5 (58.1)	10.4 (50.7)	8.1 (46.6)	13.4 (56.1)
Average precipitation mm (inches)	36 (1.4)	32 (1.3)	35 (1.4)	37 (1.5)	34 (1.3)	23 (0.9)	9 (0.4)	19 (0.7)	51 (2.0)	74 (2.9)	51 (2.0)	52 (2.0)	454 (17.9)
Average precipitation days (≥ 1 mm)	4	3	4	5	5	3	1	2	4	5	4	5	44
Mean monthly sunshine hours	169	169	212	229	256	271	314	285	237	201	167	150	2,660
Source: Agencia Estatal de Meteorología

Climate data for Valencia (4km from sea, altitude: 11 m.a.s.l., 2001–2010, location)
Month	Jan	Feb	Mar	Apr	May	Jun	Jul	Aug	Sep	Oct	Nov	Dec	Year
Mean daily maximum °C (°F)	16.8 (62.2)	17.0 (62.6)	19.6 (67.3)	21.1 (70.0)	23.9 (75.0)	28.1 (82.6)	30.0 (86.0)	30.6 (87.1)	27.8 (82.0)	24.7 (76.5)	20.0 (68.0)	16.7 (62.1)	23.0 (73.4)
Daily mean °C (°F)	12.2 (54.0)	12.5 (54.5)	14.9 (58.8)	16.6 (61.9)	19.5 (67.1)	23.8 (74.8)	26.1 (79.0)	26.5 (79.7)	23.6 (74.5)	20.3 (68.5)	15.3 (59.5)	12.3 (54.1)	18.6 (65.5)
Mean daily minimum °C (°F)	7.6 (45.7)	7.9 (46.2)	10.2 (50.4)	12.1 (53.8)	15.1 (59.2)	19.5 (67.1)	22.2 (72.0)	22.3 (72.1)	19.4 (66.9)	15.8 (60.4)	10.6 (51.1)	7.8 (46.0)	14.2 (57.6)
Average precipitation mm (inches)	34.6 (1.36)	40.1 (1.58)	42.5 (1.67)	40.5 (1.59)	63.9 (2.52)	30.2 (1.19)	7.0 (0.28)	17.5 (0.69)	93.5 (3.68)	85.2 (3.35)	36.4 (1.43)	46.7 (1.84)	538.3 (21.19)
Average precipitation days (≥ 1 mm)	3.3	5.0	3.9	5.4	5.4	2.5	1.0	2.6	5.2	5.3	3.6	5.2	48.4
Source: Agencia Estatal de Meteorología

Climate data for Valencia Airport (1991-2020)- 8 km west of the city, inland, ~12km from the sea (elevation: 56 m)
Month	Jan	Feb	Mar	Apr	May	Jun	Jul	Aug	Sep	Oct	Nov	Dec	Year
Mean daily maximum °C (°F)	16.7 (62.1)	17.5 (63.5)	19.7 (67.5)	21.7 (71.1)	27.0 (80.6)	28.5 (83.3)	31.0 (87.8)	31.4 (88.5)	28.4 (83.1)	24.8 (76.6)	20.0 (68.0)	17.1 (62.8)	23.7 (74.6)
Daily mean °C (°F)	10.6 (51.1)	11.3 (52.3)	13.5 (56.3)	15.7 (60.3)	19.0 (66.2)	22.8 (73.0)	25.5 (77.9)	26.0 (78.8)	22.9 (73.2)	19.1 (66.4)	14.2 (57.6)	11.3 (52.3)	17.7 (63.8)
Mean daily minimum °C (°F)	4.6 (40.3)	5.2 (41.4)	7.3 (45.1)	9.7 (49.5)	13.1 (55.6)	17.1 (62.8)	20.1 (68.2)	20.5 (68.9)	17.4 (63.3)	13.4 (56.1)	8.5 (47.3)	5.4 (41.7)	11.9 (53.4)
Average precipitation mm (inches)	34.6 (1.36)	26.8 (1.06)	36.2 (1.43)	36.9 (1.45)	36.5 (1.44)	20.8 (0.82)	6.7 (0.26)	11.6 (0.46)	61.3 (2.41)	56.6 (2.23)	45.1 (1.78)	47.1 (1.85)	420.2 (16.55)
Average precipitation days (≥ 1 mm)	3.5	3.2	3.9	4.4	4.2	2.2	1.2	2	4.7	4.4	4.1	4.1	41.9
Average relative humidity (%)	62.4	60.4	59.2	58.4	56.7	55.9	57.9	59.7	62	63.8	62.9	64.2	60.3
Mean monthly sunshine hours	188.3	191.3	234.8	257.6	289.9	318.5	344.1	307.4	247.4	218.9	184.4	173.6	2,956.2
Source: NCEI

Climate data for Almàssera - 7 km north of the city (data from 1947-1955, altitude: 10m)
Month	Jan	Feb	Mar	Apr	May	Jun	Jul	Aug	Sep	Oct	Nov	Dec	Year
Mean daily maximum °C (°F)	16.0 (60.8)	16.4 (61.5)	18.8 (65.8)	20.0 (68.0)	22.6 (72.7)	25.7 (78.3)	28.6 (83.5)	29.6 (85.3)	27.5 (81.5)	24.2 (75.6)	21.4 (70.5)	16.7 (62.1)	22.3 (72.1)
Daily mean °C (°F)	10.9 (51.6)	11.3 (52.3)	12.8 (55.0)	14.6 (58.3)	17.4 (63.3)	21.0 (69.8)	23.8 (74.8)	24.6 (76.3)	22.4 (72.3)	18.9 (66.0)	15.8 (60.4)	11.6 (52.9)	17.2 (63.0)
Mean daily minimum °C (°F)	5.8 (42.4)	6.1 (43.0)	6.8 (44.2)	9.1 (48.4)	12.2 (54.0)	16.3 (61.3)	19.1 (66.4)	19.7 (67.5)	17.2 (63.0)	13.6 (56.5)	10.1 (50.2)	6.6 (43.9)	11.8 (53.2)
Average precipitation mm (inches)	18 (0.7)	33 (1.3)	26 (1.0)	32 (1.3)	34 (1.3)	8 (0.3)	6 (0.2)	39 (1.5)	58 (2.3)	74 (2.9)	18 (0.7)	31 (1.2)	377 (14.8)
Source: Sistema de Clasificación Bioclimática Mundial

Climate data for Valencia (1991–2020 normals), altitude: 11 m (36 ft) a.s.l.
Month	Jan	Feb	Mar	Apr	May	Jun	Jul	Aug	Sep	Oct	Nov	Dec	Year
Mean daily maximum °C (°F)	16.8 (62.2)	17.4 (63.3)	19.4 (66.9)	21.2 (70.2)	24.0 (75.2)	27.5 (81.5)	29.9 (85.8)	30.6 (87.1)	28.0 (82.4)	24.6 (76.3)	20.2 (68.4)	17.4 (63.3)	23.1 (73.6)
Daily mean °C (°F)	12.1 (53.8)	12.7 (54.9)	14.7 (58.5)	16.6 (61.9)	19.6 (67.3)	23.3 (73.9)	25.9 (78.6)	26.5 (79.7)	23.7 (74.7)	20.1 (68.2)	15.6 (60.1)	12.8 (55.0)	18.6 (65.6)
Mean daily minimum °C (°F)	7.5 (45.5)	8.0 (46.4)	9.9 (49.8)	11.9 (53.4)	15.1 (59.2)	19.0 (66.2)	21.9 (71.4)	22.5 (72.5)	19.3 (66.7)	15.6 (60.1)	11.0 (51.8)	8.3 (46.9)	14.2 (57.5)
Average precipitation mm (inches)	39 (1.5)	30 (1.2)	40 (1.6)	33 (1.3)	36 (1.4)	26 (1.0)	7 (0.3)	15 (0.6)	70 (2.8)	63 (2.5)	52 (2.0)	48 (1.9)	459 (18.1)
Average precipitation days (≥ 1mm)	3.9	3.5	4.1	4.5	4.2	2.2	1.2	2.3	5.2	4.7	4.3	4.3	44.4
Average relative humidity (%)	65	64	64	62	66	66	68	68	67	68	66	66	66
Mean monthly sunshine hours	174	181	217	237	267	282	313	288	237	208	171	158	2,733
Source: Agencia Estatal de Meteorologia (AEMET OpenData)

== Curio ==
Valencia has a similar latitude to Madrid. However, the climate of these Spanish cities is very different, as Valencia is located at the seaside; Madrid is located in the approximate middle of the inland plateau. Valencia has much warmer winters (data from January, the coldest month):

- Valencia: 16.4 °C (61.5 °F) during the day and 7.1 °C (44.8 °F) at night
- Madrid: 10 °C (50 °F) during the day and 2 °C (36 °F) at night

and also Valencia has longer summers and milder temperatures in the middle of summer during the day.

== See also ==
Climate in other places in Iberian Peninsula:

- Climate of Spain
- Climate of Barcelona
- Climate of Bilbao
- Climate of Madrid
- Climate of Lisbon
- Climate of Gibraltar
