= Climate of Madrid =

Madrid and its metropolitan area has a cold semi-arid climate (Köppen climate classification: BSk) which transitions to a mediterranean climate (Csa) on the western half of the city. According to the Troll-Paffen climate classification, Madrid has warm-temperate subtropical climate (Warmgemäßigt-subtropisches Zonenklima) and according to the Siegmund/Frankenberg climate classification, Madrid has a subtropical climate. Madrid has hot summers and relatively cool winters with somewhat frequent frosts (13 days have lows under 0 °C (32 °F) on average) and occasional snowfalls, with an average of 3–4 snowy days annually.

== Temperature ==
The annual average temperature in the city centre is 15.4 °C (59.7 °F), while in the airport it is 14.9 °C (58.8 °F). The city centre generally has warmer temperatures year round, due to the urban heat island, causing nighttime temperatures in the center to be higher than in surrounding areas, despite daytime temperatures being slightly lower in relation to the surrounding areas.

Climate data for Madrid (667 m), Buen Retiro Park in the city centre (1991–2020)
Month	Jan	Feb	Mar	Apr	May	Jun	Jul	Aug	Sep	Oct	Nov	Dec	Year
Mean daily maximum °C (°F)	10.0 (50.0)	12.2 (54.0)	16.2 (61.2)	18.9 (66.0)	23.2 (73.8)	28.9 (84.0)	32.8 (91.0)	32.0 (89.6)	26.5 (79.7)	19.7 (67.5)	13.5 (56.3)	10.3 (50.5)	20.3 (68.6)
Daily mean °C (°F)	6.5 (43.7)	8.0 (46.4)	11.3 (52.3)	13.6 (56.5)	17.5 (63.5)	22.8 (73.0)	26.2 (79.2)	25.7 (78.3)	21.0 (69.8)	15.4 (59.7)	10.0 (50.0)	7.0 (44.6)	15.4 (59.8)
Mean daily minimum °C (°F)	3.0 (37.4)	3.7 (38.7)	6.3 (43.3)	8.2 (46.8)	11.9 (53.4)	16.5 (61.7)	19.5 (67.1)	19.3 (66.7)	15.5 (59.9)	11.1 (52.0)	6.4 (43.5)	3.7 (38.7)	10.4 (50.8)
Source: Agencia Estatal de Meteorología

Climate data for Madrid Barajas Airport (1991–2020)
Month	Jan	Feb	Mar	Apr	May	Jun	Jul	Aug	Sep	Oct	Nov	Dec	Year
Mean daily maximum °C (°F)	11.0 (51.8)	13.2 (55.8)	16.9 (62.4)	19.4 (66.9)	24.0 (75.2)	30.1 (86.2)	33.9 (93.0)	33.3 (91.9)	27.9 (82.2)	21.3 (70.3)	14.8 (58.6)	11.3 (52.3)	21.4 (70.6)
Daily mean °C (°F)	5.8 (42.4)	7.2 (45.0)	10.4 (50.7)	12.9 (55.2)	17.0 (62.6)	22.3 (72.1)	25.6 (78.1)	25.3 (77.5)	20.6 (69.1)	15.2 (59.4)	9.6 (49.3)	6.4 (43.5)	14.9 (58.7)
Mean daily minimum °C (°F)	0.6 (33.1)	1.2 (34.2)	3.8 (38.8)	6.3 (43.3)	10.0 (50.0)	14.5 (58.1)	17.3 (63.1)	17.2 (63.0)	13.3 (55.9)	9.1 (48.4)	4.3 (39.7)	1.4 (34.5)	8.3 (46.8)
Source: Agencia Estatal de Meteorología

Climate data for Madrid Cuatro Vientos (1991–2020)
Month	Jan	Feb	Mar	Apr	May	Jun	Jul	Aug	Sep	Oct	Nov	Dec	Year
Mean daily maximum °C (°F)	10.7 (51.3)	12.8 (55.0)	16.5 (61.7)	19.1 (66.4)	23.7 (74.7)	29.6 (85.3)	33.4 (92.1)	32.8 (91.0)	27.5 (81.5)	20.8 (69.4)	14.4 (57.9)	11.1 (52.0)	21.0 (69.9)
Daily mean °C (°F)	6.4 (43.5)	7.8 (46.0)	10.9 (51.6)	13.2 (55.8)	17.4 (63.3)	22.7 (72.9)	26.1 (79.0)	25.7 (78.3)	21.1 (70.0)	15.6 (60.1)	10.0 (50.0)	7.0 (44.6)	15.3 (59.6)
Mean daily minimum °C (°F)	2.0 (35.6)	2.7 (36.9)	5.3 (41.5)	7.4 (45.3)	11.1 (52.0)	15.8 (60.4)	18.8 (65.8)	18.6 (65.5)	14.7 (58.5)	10.3 (50.5)	5.5 (41.9)	2.8 (37.0)	9.6 (49.2)
Source: Agencia Estatal de Meteorología

Observatory of Buen Retiro Park (667 m) (1991–2020)
Variable	Jan	Feb	Mar	Apr	May	Jun	Jul	Aug	Sep	Oct	Nov	Dec	Year
Daily thermal range (Cº)	7.0	8.5	9.9	10.7	11.3	12.7	13.3	12.7	11.0	8.6	7.1	6.6	10
Average no. of days with max. temperature ≥ 35 °C (95 °F)	0.0	0.0	0.0	0.0	0.0	2.8	10.2	7.2	0.3	0.0	0.0	0.0	20.5
Average no. of days with max. temperature ≥ 30 °C (86 °F)	0.0	0.0	0.0	0.0	2.9	13.9	24.6	23.1	6.6	0.0	0.0	0.0	71.1
Average no. of days with max. temperature ≥ 25 °C (77 °F)	0.0	0.0	0.3	3.2	12.4	23.6	30.1	29.8	20.0	3.3	0.0	0.0	122.7
Average no. of days with min. temperature ≥ 20 °C (68 °F)	0.0	0.0	0.0	0.0	0.1	5.5	15.6	14.9	1.8	0.0	0.0	0.0	37.9
Average no. of days with min. temperature ≤ 0 °C (32 °F)	5	2.7	0.7	0.0	0.0	0.0	0.0	0.0	0.0	0.0	0.6	3.7	12.7
Average no. of days with min. temperature ≤ −5 °C (23 °F)	0.1	0.0	0.0	0.0	0.0	0.0	0.0	0.0	0.0	0.0	0.0	0.1	0.2

Observatory of Barajas Airport (609 m) (1991–2020)
Variable	Jan	Feb	Mar	Apr	May	Jun	Jul	Aug	Sep	Oct	Nov	Dec	Year
Daily thermal range (Cº)	10.4	12.0	13.1	13.1	14.0	15.6	16.6	16.1	14.6	12.2	10.5	9.9	13.2
Average no. of days with max. temperature ≥ 35 °C (95 °F)	0.0	0.0	0.0	0.0	0.1	4.6	13.8	10.9	0.7	0.0	0.0	0.0	30.1
Average no. of days with max. temperature ≥ 30 °C (86 °F)	0.0	0.0	0.0	0.1	4.0	16.7	26.6	26.2	10.9	0.6	0.0	0.0	85.1
Average no. of days with max. temperature ≥ 25 °C (77 °F)	0.0	0.0	0.5	4.2	13.7	25.4	30.5	30.5	22.4	6.8	0.0	0.0	134
Average no. of days with min. temperature ≥ 20 °C (68 °F)	0.0	0.0	0.0	0.0	0.0	1.3	5.2	4.3	0.2	0.0	0.0	0.0	11
Average no. of days with min. temperature ≤ 0 °C (32 °F)	15.3	11.5	3.6	0.6	0.0	0.0	0.0	0.0	0.0	0.2	4.7	12.5	48.4
Average no. of days with min. temperature ≤ −5 °C (23 °F)	1.9	0.8	0.1	0.0	0.0	0.0	0.0	0.0	0.0	0.0	0.2	1.4	4.4

Observatory of Cuatro Vientos (690 m) (1991–2020)
Variable	Jan	Feb	Mar	Apr	May	Jun	Jul	Aug	Sep	Oct	Nov	Dec	Year
Daily thermal range (Cº)	8.8	10.1	11.2	11.7	12.6	13.8	14.6	14.2	12.8	10.5	8.9	8.3	11.5
Average no. of days with max. temperature ≥ 35 °C (95 °F)	0.0	0.0	0.0	0.0	0.1	3.9	12.2	9.5	0.5	0.0	0.0	0.0	26.2
Average no. of days with max. temperature ≥ 30 °C (86 °F)	0.0	0.0	0.0	0.0	3.5	15.6	25.9	25.0	9.6	0.5	0.0	0.0	80.1
Average no. of days with max. temperature ≥ 25 °C (77 °F)	0.0	0.0	0.4	3.7	13.2	24.5	30.4	30.2	21.9	6.1	0.0	0.0	130.4
Average no. of days with min. temperature ≥ 20 °C (68 °F)	0.0	0.0	0.0	0.0	0.0	3.8	12.1	10.5	1.1	0.0	0.0	0.0	27.5
Average no. of days with min. temperature ≤ 0 °C (32 °F)	8.7	4.8	1.4	0.1	0.1	0.0	0.0	0.0	0.0	0.0	1.6	6.4	23.1
Average no. days with min. temperature ≤ −5 °C (23 °F)	0.4	0.2	0.1	0.0	0.0	0.0	0.0	0.0	0.0	0.0	0.0	0.3	1

== Seasons ==
=== Spring ===
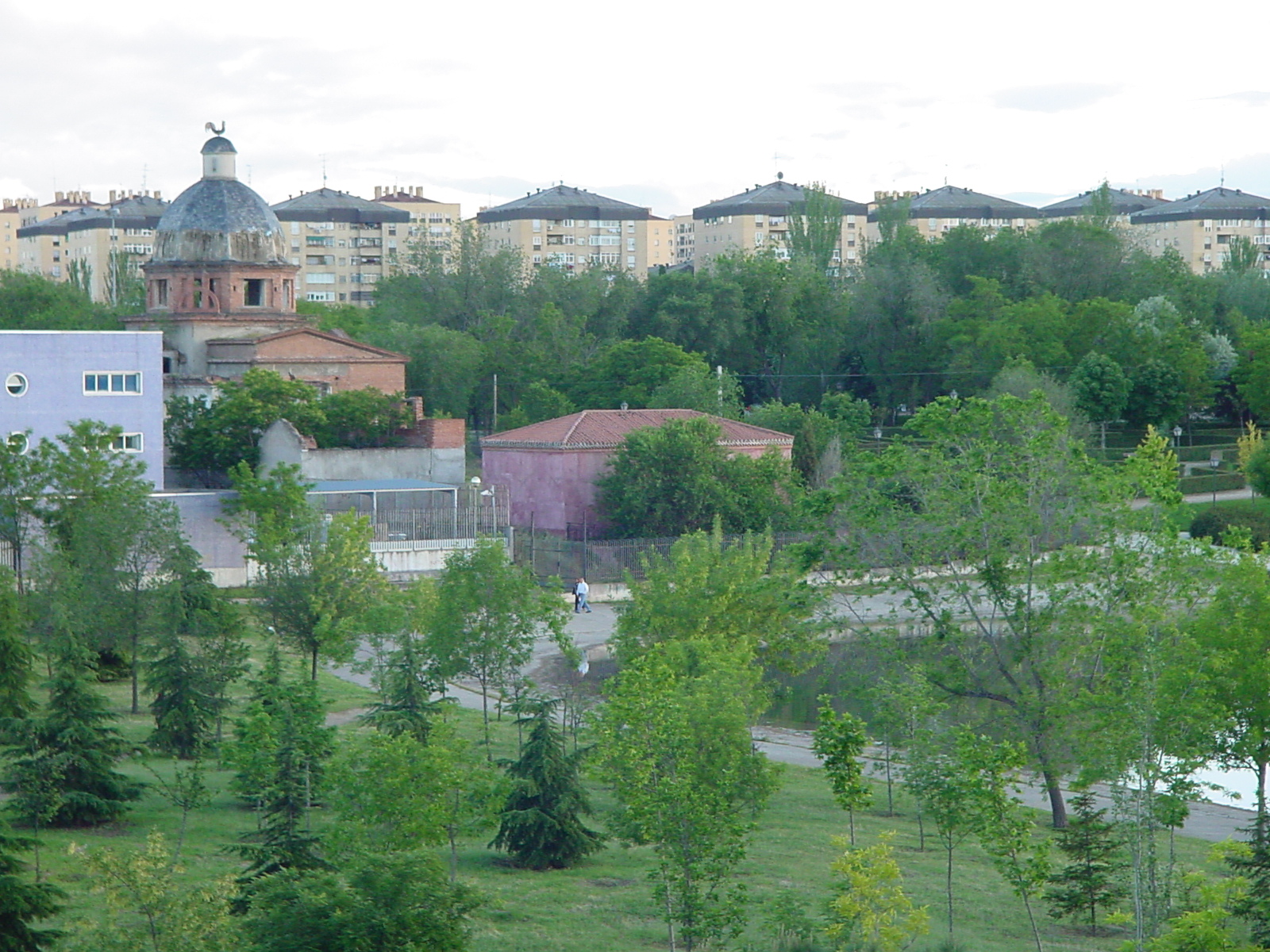
May 2008 in Pradolongo.

Late Spring, in the months of May and June, is witness to the peak of pollinization of Gramineae, the main culprit behind rhinitis and bronchial asthma in Madrid. Years with high concentrations have proven a public health issue, with punctual cases of asthma epidemics among the inhabitants of Madrid in the aforementioned months.

== Precipitation ==
Madrid has on average only 59 precipitation days a year, therein average several rainy days per month (≥ 1 mm), ranging from 2 days in July and August to 7 days in October. The average annual precipitation is less than 417 millimetres (16.4 in) on the center and around 373 millimetres (14.7 in) on airport on eastern half of the city. Madrid is the European capital with the least annual precipitation, as well as the only with a semi-arid climate

Climate data for Madrid, Retiro Park (1991–2020)
Month	Jan	Feb	Mar	Apr	May	Jun	Jul	Aug	Sep	Oct	Nov	Dec	Year
Average precipitation mm (inches)	32.0 (1.26)	34.0 (1.34)	35.0 (1.38)	46.0 (1.81)	48.0 (1.89)	20.0 (0.79)	9.0 (0.35)	10.0 (0.39)	24.0 (0.94)	64.0 (2.52)	52.0 (2.05)	42.0 (1.65)	416 (16.37)
Average precipitation days (≥ 1 mm)	5.5	5.1	5.4	6.7	6.8	3.3	1.5	1.5	3.5	7.2	6.7	5.9	59.1
Source: Agencia Estatal de Meteorología

Climate data for Madrid Airport (1991–2020)
Month	Jan	Feb	Mar	Apr	May	Jun	Jul	Aug	Sep	Oct	Nov	Dec	Year
Average precipitation mm (inches)	28.1 (1.11)	29.5 (1.16)	32.5 (1.28)	39.1 (1.54)	40.8 (1.61)	20.3 (0.80)	9.1 (0.36)	10.0 (0.39)	25.4 (1.00)	57.1 (2.25)	47.3 (1.86)	34.3 (1.35)	373.5 (14.71)
Average precipitation days (≥ 1 mm)	5.2	4.2	4.8	6.4	6.1	3.3	1.3	1.4	2.9	6.9	6.3	5.5	54.3
Source: Agencia Estatal de Meteorología

Climate data for Madrid Cuantro Vientos (1991–2020)
Month	Jan	Feb	Mar	Apr	May	Jun	Jul	Aug	Sep	Oct	Nov	Dec	Year
Average precipitation mm (inches)	33.3 (1.31)	35.4 (1.39)	34.7 (1.37)	44.2 (1.74)	44.0 (1.73)	19.4 (0.76)	8.4 (0.33)	10.8 (0.43)	25.7 (1.01)	62.2 (2.45)	51.5 (2.03)	42.5 (1.67)	412.1 (16.22)
Average precipitation days	5.4	5.2	5.4	6.8	6.3	2.8	1.4	1.4	3.5	7.1	6.5	5.9	57.7
Source: Agencia Estatal de Meteorologia

Observatory of Buen Retiro Park (667 m) (1991–2020)
Variable	Jan	Feb	Mar	Apr	May	Jun	Jul	Aug	Sep	Oct	Nov	Dec	Year
Average precipitation days ≥ 0.1mm	8.5	7.3	8.0	9.8	9.5	5.3	2.2	2.8	5.7	9.8	9.4	8.8	87.1
Average precipitation days ≥ 10 mm	1.0	1.1	1.1	1.5	1.6	0.6	0.3	0.3	0.7	2.3	1.9	1.4	13.8
Average precipitation days ≥ 30 mm	0.0	0.0	0.0	0.0	0.2	0.0	0.0	0.0	0.1	0.2	0.1	0.0	0.6
Average hail days	0.0	0.0	0.3	0.5	0.3	0.1	0.0	0.1	0.1	0.1	0.0	0.0	1.5

Observatory of Barajas Airport (609 m) (1991–2020)
Variable	Jan	Feb	Mar	Apr	May	Jun	Jul	Aug	Sep	Oct	Nov	Dec	Year
Average precipitation days ≥ 0.1mm	7.3	6.8	7.5	9.0	9.0	4.9	2.1	2.1	4.6	9.0	8.8	8.3	79.4
Average precipitation days ≥ 10 mm	0.8	0.9	1.0	1.1	1.3	0.6	0.2	0.3	0.8	2.1	1.7	1.0	11.8
Average precipitation days ≥ 30 mm	0.0	0.0	0.0	0.0	0.0	0.0	0.0	0.0	0.1	0.2	0.1	0.0	0.4
Average hail days	0.0	0.1	0.1	0.2	0.1	0.0	0.1	0.1	0.1	0.0	0.0	0.0	0.8

Observatory of Cuatro Vientos (690 m) (1991–2020)
Variable	Jan	Feb	Mar	Apr	May	Jun	Jul	Aug	Sep	Oct	Nov	Dec	Year
Average precipitation days ≥ 0.1mm	8.5	7.0	7.8	9.5	8.9	4.2	2.0	2.3	5.0	9.4	9.2	9.1	82.9
Average precipitation days ≥ 10 mm	1.0	1.0	1.2	1.5	1.4	0.4	0.3	0.4	0.7	2.4	1.7	1.5	13.5
Average precipitation days ≥ 30 mm	0.0	0.0	0.0	0.0	0.1	0.0	0.0	0.0	0.1	0.2	0.2	0.0	0.6
Average hail days	0.0	0.2	0.1	0.6	0.4	0.2	0.1	0.1	0.1	0.0	0.0	0.0	1.8

== Sunshine and UV index ==
Sunshine duration is 2,769 hours per year, from 124 (4 hours per day on average) in December to 359 (above 11.6 hours per day on average) in July. This makes Madrid one of the sunnier cities in Europe. It is also slightly above average for the southern half of Europe, where annual sunshine duration typically varies from about 2,000 to about 3,000 hours per year. In the northern half of Europe, sunshine duration is around 1500 hours per year. In winter Madrid has about three times more sun duration than in the northern half of Europe. Madrid has the second highest UV value among continental European capitals after Athens and Lisbon. The values are close to that of Pittsburgh, Pennsylvania as ultraviolet radiation suffers little interference from other geographic variables. Although values are still average, which is not as risky as almost the entire continent, except the afternoons of the warmer months, where exposure should be reduced. The amount varies from 2 between November and January to 9 between June and July.

Climate data for Madrid Barajas Airport
Month	Jan	Feb	Mar	Apr	May	Jun	Jul	Aug	Sep	Oct	Nov	Dec	Year
Mean monthly sunshine hours	152	175	223	234	273	324	372	341	264	205	153	136	2,852
Mean daily sunshine hours	4.9	6.2	7.2	7.8	8.8	10.8	12.0	11.0	8.8	6.6	5.1	4.4	7.8
Percentage possible sunshine	50	58	60	58	61	72	81	80	70	59	51	47	62
Average ultraviolet index	2	3	5	6	8	9	9	8	6	4	2	2	5
Source: Agencia Estatal de Meteorología (mean daily, monthly sunshine hours and percent possible sunshine), and Weather Atlas (UV index)

== Humidity ==
Average relative humidity is around 55–58%, ranging from 32–39% in July to 75–76% in December, with more humidity in the centre and less in airport.

Climate data for Madrid, Retiro (1991–2020)
Month	Jan	Feb	Mar	Apr	May	Jun	Jul	Aug	Sep	Oct	Nov	Dec	Year
Average relative humidity (%)	72	64	57	56	54	45	39	42	51	66	72	75	58
Source: Agencia Estatal de Meteorología

Climate data for Madrid Airport (1991–2020)
Month	Jan	Feb	Mar	Apr	May	Jun	Jul	Aug	Sep	Oct	Nov	Dec	Year
Average relative humidity (%)	73	65	58	55	50	39	32	34	45	62	71	76	55
Source: Agencia Estatal de Meteorología

== Snow ==
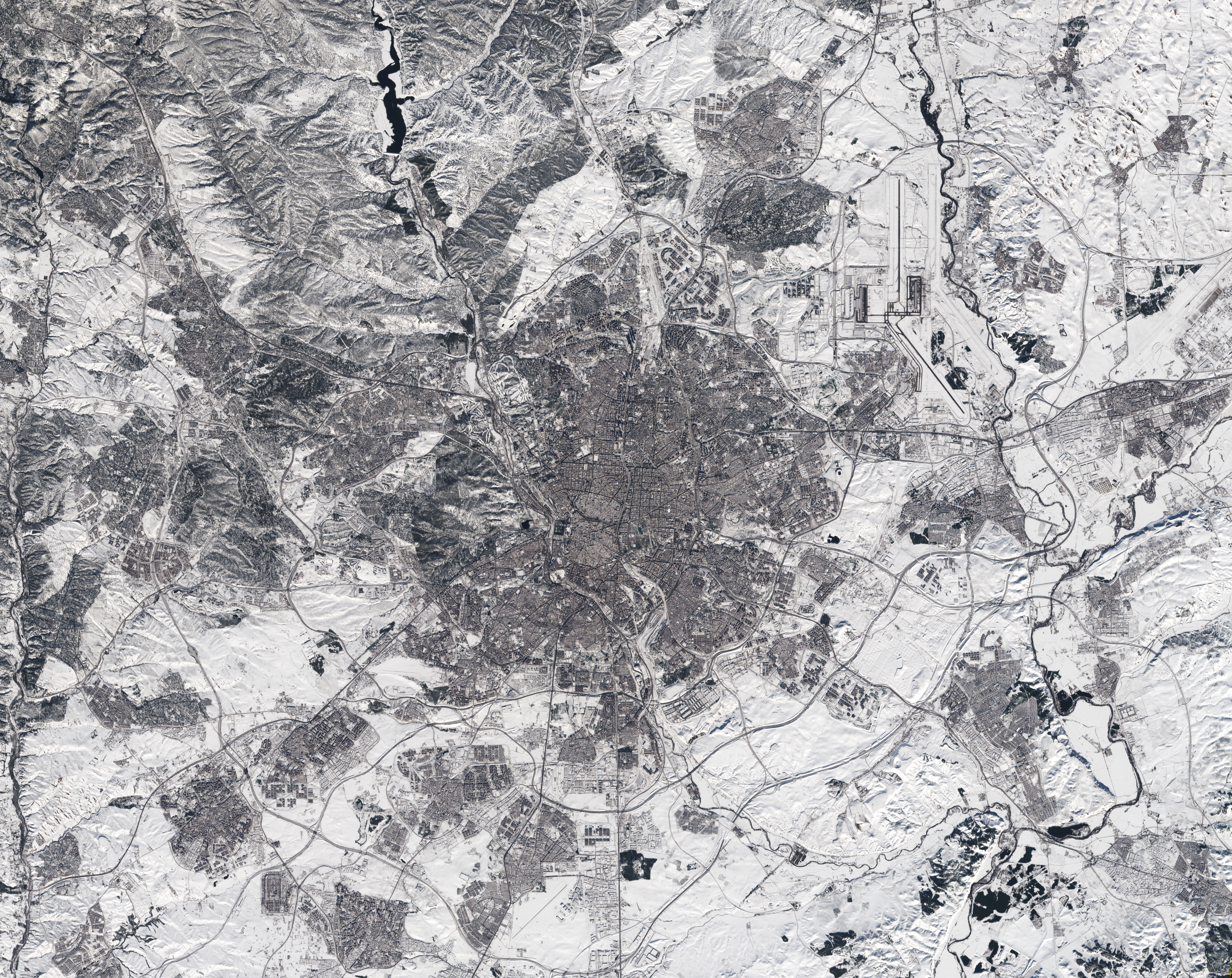
Over the passage of Storm Filomena in January 2021, Madrid was covered by a historic snowfall.

Snowfalls are occasional, happening only a few days per year. In January 1941, 8 snow days were recorded, the most for any month.

From 7 January to 10 January 2021, Madrid received its heaviest snowfall in five decades; Spain's meteorological agency AEMET reported between 50 and 60 centimetres (20 and 24 in) of accumulated snow at its weather stations within the city.

Climate data for Madrid, Retiro (1991–2020)
Month	Jan	Feb	Mar	Apr	May	Jun	Jul	Aug	Sep	Oct	Nov	Dec	Year
Average snowy days	0.9	1.0	0.2	0.2	0	0	0	0	0	0	0.1	0.5	2.9
Source: Agencia Estatal de Meteorología

Climate data for Madrid Airport (1991–2020)
Month	Jan	Feb	Mar	Apr	May	Jun	Jul	Aug	Sep	Oct	Nov	Dec	Year
Average snowy days	0.7	0.9	0.4	0	0	0	0	0	0	0	0.1	0.5	2.6
Source: Agencia Estatal de Meteorología

== Temperature extremes ==
The highest temperature recorded during the day at the Retiro station is 40.7 °C (105.3 °F) on 28 June 2019, 14 August 2021, and 14 July 2022, but higher maximum temperatures have been recorded in other stations. On July 10, 2026, a minimum temperature of 26.7 °C (80.1 °F) was recorded, making it the warmest night ever in Madrid. However, the Cuatro Vientos station, outside the city center, recorded a minimum of 27.6 °C (81.7 °F) on July 28, 1951.

The coldest temperature recorded was −10.1 °C (13.8 °F) at night on 16 January 1945, while on January 16, 1945, the maximum temperature did not exceed −3 °C (27 °F), making it the coldest day ever recorded in the region.

Climate data for Madrid Buen Retiro Park
Month	Jan	Feb	Mar	Apr	May	Jun	Jul	Aug	Sep	Oct	Nov	Dec	Year
Record high °C (°F)	19.9 (67.8)	22.0 (71.6)	26.7 (80.1)	30.9 (87.6)	35.5 (95.9)	40.7 (105.3)	40.7 (105.3)	40.7 (105.3)	38.9 (102.0)	30.0 (86.0)	22.7 (72.9)	18.6 (65.5)	40.7 (105.3)
Record low °C (°F)	−10.1 (13.8)	−9.1 (15.6)	−5.1 (22.8)	−1.6 (29.1)	0.6 (33.1)	4.4 (39.9)	8.5 (47.3)	9.2 (48.6)	4.0 (39.2)	−0.4 (31.3)	−3.4 (25.9)	−9.2 (15.4)	−10.1 (13.8)
Source: Agencia Estatal de Meteorología

Climate data for Madrid Barajas Airport
Month	Jan	Feb	Mar	Apr	May	Jun	Jul	Aug	Sep	Oct	Nov	Dec	Year
Record high °C (°F)	20.9 (69.6)	24.5 (76.1)	27.1 (80.8)	32.5 (90.5)	36.5 (97.7)	41.2 (106.2)	42.2 (108.0)	42.7 (108.9)	40.2 (104.4)	31.7 (89.1)	24.7 (76.5)	21.3 (70.3)	42.2 (108.0)
Record low °C (°F)	−15.2 (4.6)	−14.8 (5.4)	−6.6 (20.1)	−4.0 (24.8)	−0.5 (31.1)	3.9 (39.0)	7.0 (44.6)	7.4 (45.3)	1.9 (35.4)	−2.4 (27.7)	−7.4 (18.7)	−10.5 (13.1)	−15.2 (4.6)
Source: Agencia Estatal de Meteorología

=== Mean temperatures ===
==== Madrid, Retiro ====
Variable	Temperature	Month recorded
Highest mean maximum temperature	36.8 °C (98.2 °F)	July 2022
Highest mean monthly temperature	29.6 °C (85.3 °F)	July 2015
Highest mean minimum temperature	22.9 °C (73.2 °F)	July 2015
Lowest mean maximum temperature	5.6 °C (42.1 °F)	January 1945
Lowest mean monthly temperature	1.9 °C (35.4 °F)	February 1956
Lowest mean minimum temperature	−2.6 °C (27.3 °F)	February 1956

==== Madrid, Cuatro Vientos ====
Variable	Temperature	Month recorded
Highest mean maximum temperature	37.3 °C (99.1 °F)	July 2022
Highest mean monthly temperature	29.8 °C (85.6 °F)	July 2022
Highest mean minimum temperature	22.4 °C (72.3 °F)	July 2015
Lowest mean maximum temperature	5.9 °C (42.6 °F)	January 1946
Lowest mean monthly temperature	1.5 °C (34.7 °F)	February 1956
Lowest mean minimum temperature	−3.5 °C (25.7 °F)	February 1956

==== Madrid, Barajas Airport ====
Variable	Temperature	Month recorded
Highest mean maximum temperature	37.7 °C (99.9 °F)	July 2022
Highest mean monthly temperature	28.9 °C (84.0 °F)	July 2022
Highest mean minimum temperature	20.7 °C (69.3 °F)	July 2015
Lowest mean maximum temperature	6.2 °C (43.2 °F)	January 1945
Lowest mean monthly temperature	1.2 °C (34.2 °F)	January 1945
Lowest mean minimum temperature	−3.8 °C (25.2 °F)	December 2001

== Daylight ==
Madrid, as well as the rest of Spain (except the Canary Islands), are in the UTC +1 time zone and UTC +2 in summer time. Sunrise and sunset occur relatively late compared to other countries in southern Europe or even slightly higher latitudes. Madrid enjoys one of the most optimal number of hours of daylight in Europe. Days in winter are not as short as in the northern part of the continent, the average hours of daylight in December, January and February is 10 hours (for comparison: London or Moscow or Warsaw – about 8 hours), and it is the European capital with the latest sunsets during winter. During the summer, the days have an average length of 14 hours, being the European capital with the latest sunrises in summer, as well as the capital with the latest sunset in southern Europe. Sunset occurs after 21:00 (9:00 pm) throughout most of the summer.

Average hours of daylight
Hours	Jan	Feb	Mar	Apr	May	Jun	Jul	Aug	Sep	Oct	Nov	Dec
Day	10	11	12	13	14	15	15	14	12	11	10	9
Twilight/Night	14	13	12	11	10	9	9	10	12	13	14	15

== See also ==
Climate in other places in Iberian Peninsula:

- Climate of Barcelona
- Climate of Bilbao
- Climate of Valencia
- Climate of Gibraltar
- Climate of Lisbon
- Climate of Spain
