= Climate of Lisbon =

Lisbon

Climate chart (precipitation, max. and min. temperature)
J	F	M	A	M	J	J	A	S	O	N	D
104 15 9	78 16 9	69 19 11	72 20 12	58 23 14	14 26 17	2.6 28 18	5.4 29 19	39 27 18	111 23 15	134 18 12	109 15 9
- █ Average max. and min. temperatures in °C
- █ Precipitation totals in mm
- Source: Instituto de Meteorologia
Imperial conversion
J	F	M	A	M	J	J	A	S	O	N	D
4.1 59 47	3.1 62 48	2.7 66 52	2.8 69 54	2.3 74 58	0.6 79 62	0.1 83 65	0.2 84 65	1.5 80 64	4.4 73 59	5.3 65 53	4.3 60 49
- █ Average max. and min. temperatures in °F
- █ Precipitation totals in inches

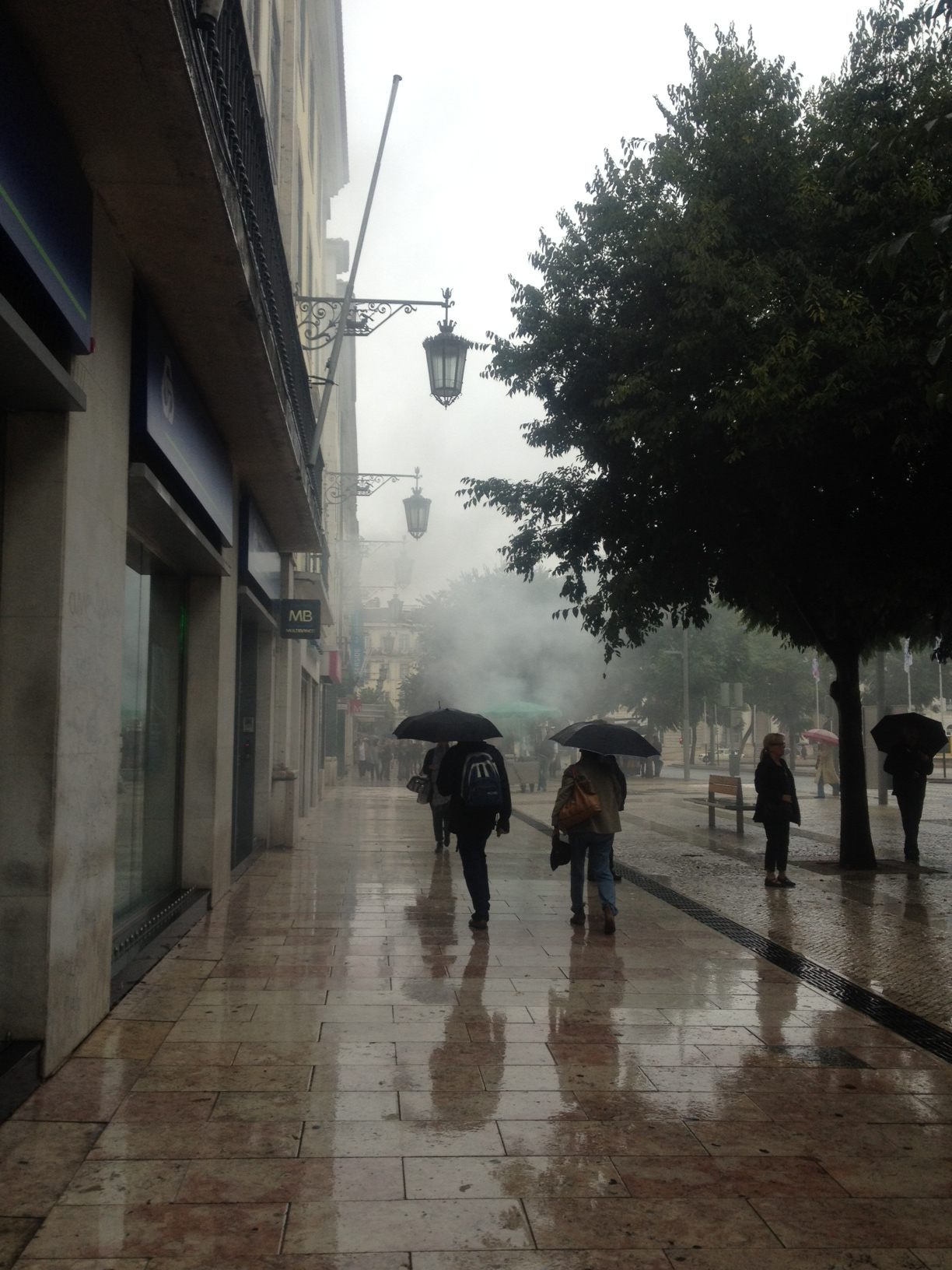
Rainy day in Lisbon

Lisbon and its metropolitan area feature a mild Mediterranean climate (Köppen: Csb/Csa), with short, mild and rainy winters and warm to hot, dry summers. According to the Troll-Paffen climate classification, Lisbon has a warm-temperate subtropical climate (Warmgemäßigt-subtropisches Zonenklima). According to the Siegmund/Frankenberg climate classification, Lisbon has a subtropical climate.

== Classifications ==
Lisbon Climate according to major climate systems
Climatic scheme	Initials	Description
Köppen system	Csa	hot-summer Mediterranean climate
Trewartha system	Cs	Subtropical dry summer
Alisov system	—N/a	Subtropical climate
Strahler system	—N/a	Mediterranean climate
Thornthwaite system	C1 w2 B’2 a’	Subhumid Mesothermal
Neef system	—N/a	West coast − rainy winter climate

== Temperature ==
=== Normals ===
Lisbon has mild to warm, moderated temperatures. Winters are mild especially for its latitude with average daytime temperatures between 15 and 16 °C (59 and 61 °F) and nighttime lows between 8 and 10 °C (46 and 50 °F). Summers are warm to hot, but due to the upwelling phenomena in the western coasts of its metropolitan area, maxima in summer fluctuates considerably depending on the location. Regions across the Tagus Estuary, for example, typically average around 30 °C (86 °F) maxima in July and August, while areas west of the city and close to the coast, such as Cascais or Sintra, will usually average around 23–25 °C (73–77 °F) maxima, reaching as low as 21 °C (70 °F) in Cabo da Roca. Costa da Caparica is an exception to this rule as it is far less exposed to the cooler ocean currents and is therefore warmer in the summer. Nighttime lows during summer are often dependent on the location, generally around 16–19 °C (61–66 °F), but the typical urban heat island phenomenon felt by the capital can increase these lows significantly compared to rural areas of its district.

Climate data for Lisbon
Month	Jan	Feb	Mar	Apr	May	Jun	Jul	Aug	Sep	Oct	Nov	Dec	Year
Mean daily maximum °C (°F)	14.8 (58.6)	16.2 (61.2)	18.8 (65.8)	19.8 (67.6)	22.1 (71.8)	25.7 (78.3)	27.9 (82.2)	28.3 (82.9)	26.5 (79.7)	22.5 (72.5)	18.2 (64.8)	15.3 (59.5)	21.3 (70.4)
Daily mean °C (°F)	11.6 (52.9)	12.7 (54.9)	14.9 (58.8)	15.9 (60.6)	18.0 (64.4)	21.2 (70.2)	23.1 (73.6)	23.5 (74.3)	22.1 (71.8)	18.8 (65.8)	15.0 (59.0)	12.4 (54.3)	17.4 (63.4)
Mean daily minimum °C (°F)	8.3 (46.9)	9.1 (48.4)	11.0 (51.8)	11.9 (53.4)	13.9 (57.0)	16.6 (61.9)	18.2 (64.8)	18.6 (65.5)	17.6 (63.7)	15.1 (59.2)	11.8 (53.2)	9.4 (48.9)	13.5 (56.2)
Source: Instituto de Meteorologia

=== Extremes ===
Lisbon's location on the westernmost side of continental Europe makes it much less vulnerable to both heatwaves and coldwaves, though outbreaks of the Saharan Air Layer can sometimes push the temperatures above 40 °C (104 °F) as it happened as part of the 2018 European heat wave, skies were a shade of white due to the extreme concentrations of airborne dust particles. Temperatures in two of Lisbon's stations reached an all-time high of 44.0 °C (111.2 °F) on 4 August of that same year. The third station (Tapada da Ajuda) recorded 43.3 °C (109.9 °F). The coldest temperature ever recorded in the city was −1.5 °C (29.3 °F) on both 15 February 1860 and 15 January 1985

In a normal year, the recorded maxima can go anywhere from 12–19 °C (54–66 °F) in the winter and 23–35 °C (73–95 °F) in the summer, and the minima from 3–13 °C (37–55 °F) in the winter and 16–24 °C (61–75 °F) in the summer. Temperatures beyond these are usually considered irregular and limited to exceptional years. Lisbon is on the USDA hardiness zone 10b.

Climate data for Lisbon
Month	Jan	Feb	Mar	Apr	May	Jun	Jul	Aug	Sep	Oct	Nov	Dec	Year
Record high °C (°F)	24.1 (75.4)	26.8 (80.2)	30.4 (86.7)	33.2 (91.8)	37.8 (100.0)	44.0 (111.2)	40.6 (105.1)	44.0 (111.2)	41.4 (106.5)	34.6 (94.3)	28.3 (82.9)	25.2 (77.4)	44.0 (111.2)
Record low °C (°F)	−1.5 (29.3)	−1.2 (29.8)	0.0 (32.0)	2.5 (36.5)	5.0 (41.0)	8.0 (46.4)	10.2 (50.4)	11.0 (51.8)	9.0 (48.2)	6.0 (42.8)	3.4 (38.1)	0.5 (32.9)	−1.5 (29.3)
Source: Instituto de Meteorologia

== Precipitation ==
Lisbon can be described both as a moist and a dry city depending on the season of the year. Precipitation is most common in Autumn and Winter. Summers in Lisbon tend to be very dry due to the Azores High though exceptions happen and low-pressure areas can come into play bringing much more rainfall than normal but still avoiding a wet summer (>30 mm (1.2 in)). Foggy mornings are also common in the summer, especially in coastal areas and can bring drizzle which can sometimes be observed early in the day in wet roads and calçadas.

Lisbon has on average 112 precipitation days a year of which around 30% is drizzle (below 1 mm (0.039 in)). The driest months, July and August, have on average two days of precipitation (4–6 mm (0.16–0.24 in) of which 50% is drizzle), and the wettest months, November and December, have on average 12–15 days of precipitation and around 127 mm (5.0 in). December is the rainiest month of which half the days receive some form of precipitation. The average annual rainfall is 774 mm (30.5 in).

Climate data for Lisbon
Month	Jan	Feb	Mar	Apr	May	Jun	Jul	Aug	Sep	Oct	Nov	Dec	Year
Average precipitation mm (inches)	99.9 (3.93)	84.9 (3.34)	53.2 (2.09)	68.1 (2.68)	53.6 (2.11)	15.9 (0.63)	4.2 (0.17)	6.2 (0.24)	32.9 (1.30)	100.8 (3.97)	127.6 (5.02)	126.7 (4.99)	774 (30.5)
Average precipitation days (≥ 0.1mm)	13.0	13.0	10.0	13.0	9.0	5.0	2.0	2.0	6.0	11.0	12.0	15.0	112.0
Source: Instituto de Meteorologia, Hong Kong Observatory for data of avg. precipitation days

== Humidity ==
In the same way precipitation varies greatly from month to month, the average relative humidity also experiences considerable seasonal changes. Lisbon has very humid winters, averaging 78-80% humidity. The air in the summer is otherwise dry, 60 to 65%, and is particularly variable, often going below 40% during the day and surpassing 70% at night.

Climate data for Lisbon
Month	Jan	Feb	Mar	Apr	May	Jun	Jul	Aug	Sep	Oct	Nov	Dec	Year
Average relative humidity (%)	80	78	71	69	66	66	63	61	67	72	77	79	71
Source: NOAA

== Sunshine ==
Lisbon is one of the sunniest capital cities in mainland Europe and one of the sunniest overall places in southern Europe, with more than 2,800 yearly sunshine hours despite the relatively high yearly precipitation. Sunshine and precipitation stack up oppositely with the dullest month being also the rainiest (December) which has around 140-150 total hours. Despite July having the most sun hours, August is on average the sunniest month with around 80% chance of direct sunlight hitting the ground.

In the Lisbon area, sunshine hours reach their maximum value in the southwestern Setúbal Peninsula (near Cabo Espichel), and their lowest in the Sintra Mountains and parts of the northwest District.

Climate data for Lisbon, 1961–1990
Month	Jan	Feb	Mar	Apr	May	Jun	Jul	Aug	Sep	Oct	Nov	Dec	Year
Mean monthly sunshine hours	142.6	156.6	207.7	234.0	291.4	303.0	353.4	344.1	261.0	213.9	156.0	142.6	2,806.3
Source: Hong Kong Observatory

Climate data for Lisbon, 1990–2019
Month	Jan	Feb	Mar	Apr	May	Jun	Jul	Aug	Sep	Oct	Nov	Dec	Year
Mean monthly sunshine hours	158.6	174.7	216.0	248.0	296.8	322.2	349.7	339.9	259.8	196.4	163.1	149.7	2,874.9
Mean daily sunshine hours	5.1	6.2	7.0	8.3	9.6	10.7	11.3	11.0	8.7	6.3	5.4	4.8	7.9
Percentage possible sunshine	52	57	58	63	67	73	77	81	70	57	54	51	63
Average ultraviolet index	2	3	5	6	8	9	9	8	6	4	3	2	5
Source 1: German Meteorological Service
Source 2: Weather Atlas

== Daylight ==
Due to its southern position in Europe, Lisbon has a rather optimal number of hours of daylight. Winter days are not as short as in the northern part of the continent and summers have at least 9 hours of nighttime. The average duration of daylight in the wintertime is 10.3 hours (for comparison: London or Moscow or Warsaw have about 8 hours).

Average hours of daylight
Month	Jan	Feb	Mar	Apr	May	Jun	Jul	Aug	Sep	Oct	Nov	Dec
hours of light	9.8	10.7	11.9	13.2	14.2	14.8	14.5	13.6	12.4	11.1	10	9.5
hours of Twilight/Night	14.2	13.3	12.1	10.8	9.8	9.2	9.5	10.4	11.6	12.9	14	14.5

== Wind ==
Lisbon is generally still, though it can become quite windy in occasional Atlantic storms, accompanied by rain. The average wind speed depends largely on the area. Tapada da Ajuda has almost no sign of wind, other areas such as Gago Coutinho, near the airport, get double that wind speed. The District of Lisbon, especially the west, is one of Portugal's windiest zones. Cabo da Roca has registered wind gusts of up to 169 km/h (105 mph).

Average wind speed (km/h) 1971–2000
	Jan	Feb	Mar	Apr	May	Jun	Jul	Aug	Sep	Oct	Nov	Dec	Year
Instituto Geofísico	12.2	13.2	13.0	13.6	13.7	13.9	13.9	12.1	11.8	11.7	13.0	13.0	13.0
Tapada da Ajuda	5.7	6.1	5.9	6.1	6.3	6.6	6.8	6.8	6.1	5.8	5.4	6.1	6.1
Gago Coutinho	11.7	12.6	13.2	14.2	13.9	14.5	15.3	14.6	12.6	11.8	11.1	11.7	13.1

== Sea temperature ==
As with the rest of Portugal, ocean temperatures are extremely moderate and cool year-round, only varying 5 °C (9.0 °F) between the coldest and warmest month. The coolest months are February and March (around 15–15.5 °C (59.0–59.9 °F)) while the warmest are from August through October (around 19–20 °C (66–68 °F)). The average annual sea surface temperature is around 17.5 °C (63.5 °F).

Average sea temperature, according to surf-forecast.com:
Jan	Feb	Mar	Apr	May	Jun	Jul	Aug	Sep	Oct	Nov	Dec	Year
15.5 °C (59.9 °F)	15.0 °C (59.0 °F)	15.0 °C (59.0 °F)	16.0 °C (60.8 °F)	17.0 °C (62.6 °F)	18.5 °C (65.3 °F)	19.5 °C (67.1 °F)	20.5 °C (68.9 °F)	20.5 °C (68.9 °F)	19.5 °C (67.1 °F)	18.0 °C (64.4 °F)	16.5 °C (61.7 °F)	17.6 °C (63.7 °F)

Average sea temperature, according to seatemperature.org:
Jan	Feb	Mar	Apr	May	Jun	Jul	Aug	Sep	Oct	Nov	Dec	Year
15.8 °C (60.4 °F)	15.2 °C (59.4 °F)	15.1 °C (59.2 °F)	16.3 °C (61.3 °F)	17.4 °C (63.3 °F)	18.6 °C (65.5 °F)	18.9 °C (66.0 °F)	19.5 °C (67.1 °F)	19.9 °C (67.8 °F)	19.8 °C (67.6 °F)	18.1 °C (64.6 °F)	16.5 °C (61.7 °F)	17.6 °C (63.7 °F)

== Lisbon Metropolitan Area ==
Temperature and precipitation variation across various sections of the metropolitan area of Lisbon:

Cabo da Roca

Climate chart (precipitation, max. and min. temperature)
J	F	M	A	M	J	J	A	S	O	N	D
55 14 10	47 15 10	43 16 11	41 17 12	35 19 14	10 20 15	3.2 21 16	6.2 22 17	24 22 16	70 20 15	77 17 13	59 15 11
- █ Average max. and min. temperatures in °C
- █ Precipitation totals in mm
- Source: IPMA
Imperial conversion
J	F	M	A	M	J	J	A	S	O	N	D
2.2 58 50	1.8 58 50	1.7 61 52	1.6 62 53	1.4 65 56	0.4 69 60	0.1 70 61	0.2 71 62	0.9 71 62	2.7 68 60	3 63 55	2.3 60 52
- █ Average max. and min. temperatures in °F
- █ Precipitation totals in inches

Cascais

Climate chart (precipitation, max. and min. temperature)
J	F	M	A	M	J	J	A	S	O	N	D
97 15 9	68 16 9	91 17 11	50 19 12	38 21 13	13 24 16	2.4 26 17	4.4 26 17	29 25 17	68 22 15	82 18 12	94 16 9
- █ Average max. and min. temperatures in °C
- █ Precipitation totals in mm
- Source: IPMA
Imperial conversion
J	F	M	A	M	J	J	A	S	O	N	D
3.8 59 47	2.7 60 48	3.6 63 51	2 67 54	1.5 69 56	0.5 74 60	0.1 78 63	0.2 79 63	1.1 77 62	2.7 72 58	3.2 65 53	3.7 60 49
- █ Average max. and min. temperatures in °F
- █ Precipitation totals in inches

Oeiras

Climate chart (precipitation, max. and min. temperature)
J	F	M	A	M	J	J	A	S	O	N	D
95 15 8	93 15 8	60 17 9	59 18 10	39 21 12	17 24 14	3.8 26 16	5.6 27 17	18 26 16	70 22 14	110 18 10	96 15 8
- █ Average max. and min. temperatures in °C
- █ Precipitation totals in mm
- Source: Instituto de Meteorologia
Imperial conversion
J	F	M	A	M	J	J	A	S	O	N	D
3.7 58 46	3.7 59 47	2.4 62 48	2.3 65 50	1.5 70 53	0.7 75 58	0.1 80 61	0.2 81 62	0.7 78 60	2.8 72 56	4.3 64 51	3.8 59 47
- █ Average max. and min. temperatures in °F
- █ Precipitation totals in inches

Lisbon

Climate chart (precipitation, max. and min. temperature)
J	F	M	A	M	J	J	A	S	O	N	D
104 15 9	78 16 9	69 19 11	72 20 12	58 23 14	14 26 17	2.6 28 18	5.4 29 19	39 27 18	111 23 15	134 18 12	109 15 9
- █ Average max. and min. temperatures in °C
- █ Precipitation totals in mm
- Source: IPMA
Imperial conversion
J	F	M	A	M	J	J	A	S	O	N	D
4.1 59 47	3.1 62 48	2.7 66 52	2.8 69 54	2.3 74 58	0.6 79 62	0.1 83 65	0.2 84 66	1.5 80 64	4.4 73 60	5.3 65 53	4.3 60 49
- █ Average max. and min. temperatures in °F
- █ Precipitation totals in inches

Setúbal

Climate chart (precipitation, max. and min. temperature)
J	F	M	A	M	J	J	A	S	O	N	D
91 16 5	67 17 6	68 20 8	64 21 9	54 24 12	15 28 14	2.1 30 16	3.2 31 17	31 28 15	99 24 13	107 19 9	103 16 6
- █ Average max. and min. temperatures in °C
- █ Precipitation totals in mm
- Source: IPMA
Imperial conversion
J	F	M	A	M	J	J	A	S	O	N	D
3.6 60 41	2.6 62 42	2.7 67 46	2.5 70 49	2.1 76 53	0.6 82 58	0.1 86 61	0.1 87 62	1.2 83 59	3.9 75 55	4.2 66 48	4 61 43
- █ Average max. and min. temperatures in °F
- █ Precipitation totals in inches

Pegões, Montijo

Climate chart (precipitation, max. and min. temperature)
J	F	M	A	M	J	J	A	S	O	N	D
74 16 5	54 17 6	59 20 8	55 21 9	47 25 12	13 29 14	2.3 31 15	4.2 32 15	31 29 14	87 24 12	87 19 9	77 16 6
- █ Average max. and min. temperatures in °C
- █ Precipitation totals in mm
- Source: IPMA
Imperial conversion
J	F	M	A	M	J	J	A	S	O	N	D
2.9 60 41	2.1 62 42	2.3 68 46	2.2 71 49	1.9 77 53	0.5 84 57	0.1 89 59	0.2 89 60	1.2 84 58	3.4 76 54	3.4 66 47	3 61 43
- █ Average max. and min. temperatures in °F
- █ Precipitation totals in inches

== Other stations in the city of Lisbon ==
Climate data for Lisbon (Instituto Geofísico), elevation: 77 m or 253 ft, 1981–2010 normals
Month	Jan	Feb	Mar	Apr	May	Jun	Jul	Aug	Sep	Oct	Nov	Dec	Year
Record high °C (°F)	22.6 (72.7)	24.8 (76.6)	29.4 (84.9)	32.2 (90.0)	35.0 (95.0)	41.5 (106.7)	40.6 (105.1)	44.0 (111.2)	37.3 (99.1)	32.6 (90.7)	25.3 (77.5)	25.1 (77.2)	44.0 (111.2)
Mean daily maximum °C (°F)	14.8 (58.6)	16.2 (61.2)	18.8 (65.8)	19.8 (67.6)	22.1 (71.8)	25.7 (78.3)	27.9 (82.2)	28.3 (82.9)	26.5 (79.7)	22.5 (72.5)	18.2 (64.8)	15.3 (59.5)	21.3 (70.4)
Daily mean °C (°F)	11.6 (52.9)	12.7 (54.9)	14.9 (58.8)	15.9 (60.6)	18.0 (64.4)	21.2 (70.2)	23.1 (73.6)	23.5 (74.3)	22.1 (71.8)	18.8 (65.8)	15.0 (59.0)	12.4 (54.3)	17.4 (63.4)
Mean daily minimum °C (°F)	8.3 (46.9)	9.1 (48.4)	11.0 (51.8)	11.9 (53.4)	13.9 (57.0)	16.6 (61.9)	18.2 (64.8)	18.6 (65.5)	17.6 (63.7)	15.1 (59.2)	11.8 (53.2)	9.4 (48.9)	13.5 (56.2)
Record low °C (°F)	0.4 (32.7)	−1.2 (29.8)	0.2 (32.4)	5.5 (41.9)	6.8 (44.2)	10.3 (50.5)	13.1 (55.6)	13.8 (56.8)	10.7 (51.3)	8.0 (46.4)	3.9 (39.0)	2.1 (35.8)	−1.2 (29.8)
Average precipitation mm (inches)	99.9 (3.93)	84.9 (3.34)	53.2 (2.09)	68.1 (2.68)	53.6 (2.11)	15.9 (0.63)	4.2 (0.17)	6.2 (0.24)	32.9 (1.30)	100.8 (3.97)	127.6 (5.02)	126.7 (4.99)	774 (30.5)
Source: IPMA

Climate data for Lisbon (Instituto Geofísico), elevation: 77 m or 253 ft, 1971–2000 normals and extremes
Month	Jan	Feb	Mar	Apr	May	Jun	Jul	Aug	Sep	Oct	Nov	Dec	Year
Record high °C (°F)	20.6 (69.1)	24.8 (76.6)	28.3 (82.9)	29.4 (84.9)	35.0 (95.0)	41.5 (106.7)	40.6 (105.1)	37.9 (100.2)	37.1 (98.8)	32.6 (90.7)	25.0 (77.0)	25.1 (77.2)	41.5 (106.7)
Mean daily maximum °C (°F)	14.5 (58.1)	15.9 (60.6)	18.2 (64.8)	19.2 (66.6)	21.4 (70.5)	24.8 (76.6)	27.5 (81.5)	27.8 (82.0)	26.2 (79.2)	22.1 (71.8)	18.0 (64.4)	15.2 (59.4)	20.9 (69.6)
Daily mean °C (°F)	11.3 (52.3)	12.6 (54.7)	14.3 (57.7)	15.3 (59.5)	17.3 (63.1)	20.3 (68.5)	22.7 (72.9)	22.9 (73.2)	21.7 (71.1)	18.4 (65.1)	14.8 (58.6)	12.4 (54.3)	17.0 (62.6)
Mean daily minimum °C (°F)	8.1 (46.6)	9.2 (48.6)	10.4 (50.7)	11.5 (52.7)	13.3 (55.9)	15.9 (60.6)	17.9 (64.2)	18.1 (64.6)	17.3 (63.1)	14.6 (58.3)	11.5 (52.7)	9.5 (49.1)	13.1 (55.6)
Record low °C (°F)	0.4 (32.7)	1.2 (34.2)	2.9 (37.2)	5.5 (41.9)	6.9 (44.4)	10.3 (50.5)	13.1 (55.6)	13.8 (56.8)	10.7 (51.3)	8.0 (46.4)	3.9 (39.0)	2.4 (36.3)	0.4 (32.7)
Average precipitation mm (inches)	96.8 (3.81)	90.2 (3.55)	51.2 (2.02)	64.7 (2.55)	55.6 (2.19)	17.2 (0.68)	6.1 (0.24)	6.8 (0.27)	28.5 (1.12)	79.8 (3.14)	107.1 (4.22)	121.8 (4.80)	725.8 (28.59)
Source: IPMA

Climate data for Lisbon (Tapada da Ajuda), elevation: 37 m or 121 ft, 1971–2000 normals and extremes
Month	Jan	Feb	Mar	Apr	May	Jun	Jul	Aug	Sep	Oct	Nov	Dec	Year
Record high °C (°F)	20.1 (68.2)	24.5 (76.1)	29.0 (84.2)	29.5 (85.1)	35.6 (96.1)	41.0 (105.8)	41.2 (106.2)	38.0 (100.4)	37.5 (99.5)	33.0 (91.4)	25.5 (77.9)	23.1 (73.6)	41.2 (106.2)
Mean daily maximum °C (°F)	14.6 (58.3)	15.8 (60.4)	18.0 (64.4)	19.0 (66.2)	21.3 (70.3)	24.9 (76.8)	27.6 (81.7)	28.0 (82.4)	26.2 (79.2)	22.2 (72.0)	18.2 (64.8)	15.5 (59.9)	20.9 (69.7)
Daily mean °C (°F)	11.0 (51.8)	12.1 (53.8)	13.5 (56.3)	14.4 (57.9)	16.5 (61.7)	19.6 (67.3)	22.0 (71.6)	22.3 (72.1)	20.9 (69.6)	17.8 (64.0)	14.5 (58.1)	12.2 (54.0)	16.4 (61.5)
Mean daily minimum °C (°F)	7.3 (45.1)	8.3 (46.9)	9.0 (48.2)	9.9 (49.8)	11.8 (53.2)	14.4 (57.9)	16.3 (61.3)	16.6 (61.9)	15.6 (60.1)	13.5 (56.3)	10.9 (51.6)	8.9 (48.0)	11.9 (53.4)
Record low °C (°F)	−1.5 (29.3)	0.5 (32.9)	0.0 (32.0)	2.5 (36.5)	5.0 (41.0)	8.0 (46.4)	10.2 (50.4)	11.0 (51.8)	9.0 (48.2)	6.0 (42.8)	3.4 (38.1)	0.5 (32.9)	−1.5 (29.3)
Average precipitation mm (inches)	90.7 (3.57)	85.4 (3.36)	47.4 (1.87)	59.9 (2.36)	50.9 (2.00)	16.9 (0.67)	5.5 (0.22)	5.6 (0.22)	28.3 (1.11)	76.2 (3.00)	100.3 (3.95)	113.3 (4.46)	680.4 (26.79)
Source: IPMA

Climate data for Lisbon (Gago Coutinho), elevation: 104 m or 341 ft, 1982–2000 normals and extremes
Month	Jan	Feb	Mar	Apr	May	Jun	Jul	Aug	Sep	Oct	Nov	Dec	Year
Record high °C (°F)	19.6 (67.3)	23.8 (74.8)	28.0 (82.4)	30.4 (86.7)	33.8 (92.8)	37.6 (99.7)	42.0 (107.6)	39.0 (102.2)	38.1 (100.6)	32.3 (90.1)	25.7 (78.3)	23.1 (73.6)	42.0 (107.6)
Mean daily maximum °C (°F)	14.0 (57.2)	15.4 (59.7)	18.5 (65.3)	19.0 (66.2)	21.5 (70.7)	25.3 (77.5)	28.1 (82.6)	28.3 (82.9)	26.7 (80.1)	22.1 (71.8)	17.5 (63.5)	14.8 (58.6)	20.9 (69.7)
Daily mean °C (°F)	10.5 (50.9)	11.9 (53.4)	14.3 (57.7)	15.0 (59.0)	17.4 (63.3)	20.5 (68.9)	22.9 (73.2)	23.2 (73.8)	21.9 (71.4)	18.1 (64.6)	14.4 (57.9)	11.8 (53.2)	16.8 (62.3)
Mean daily minimum °C (°F)	7.1 (44.8)	8.4 (47.1)	10.0 (50.0)	11.1 (52.0)	13.2 (55.8)	15.8 (60.4)	17.7 (63.9)	18.0 (64.4)	17.1 (62.8)	14.1 (57.4)	11.2 (52.2)	8.9 (48.0)	12.7 (54.9)
Record low °C (°F)	−1.0 (30.2)	−0.5 (31.1)	2.4 (36.3)	3.1 (37.6)	7.0 (44.6)	9.3 (48.7)	12.4 (54.3)	13.7 (56.7)	11.4 (52.5)	7.8 (46.0)	3.3 (37.9)	1.2 (34.2)	−1.0 (30.2)
Average precipitation mm (inches)	97.7 (3.85)	82.3 (3.24)	36.1 (1.42)	68.7 (2.70)	64.4 (2.54)	14.1 (0.56)	6.0 (0.24)	5.1 (0.20)	30.6 (1.20)	86.0 (3.39)	135.8 (5.35)	127.3 (5.01)	754.1 (29.7)
Source: IPMA

Climate data for Lisbon (Príncipe Real), elevation: 95 m or 312 ft, 1961–1990 normals and extremes
Month	Jan	Feb	Mar	Apr	May	Jun	Jul	Aug	Sep	Oct	Nov	Dec	Year
Record high °C (°F)	20.6 (69.1)	24.8 (76.6)	26.2 (79.2)	28.6 (83.5)	35.1 (95.2)	41.5 (106.7)	38.5 (101.3)	39.3 (102.7)	37.1 (98.8)	32.6 (90.7)	27.8 (82.0)	23.2 (73.8)	41.5 (106.7)
Mean daily maximum °C (°F)	14.5 (58.1)	15.6 (60.1)	17.6 (63.7)	19.1 (66.4)	21.7 (71.1)	24.8 (76.6)	27.4 (81.3)	27.9 (82.2)	26.4 (79.5)	22.4 (72.3)	17.8 (64.0)	14.8 (58.6)	20.8 (69.5)
Daily mean °C (°F)	11.4 (52.5)	12.3 (54.1)	13.7 (56.7)	15.1 (59.2)	17.4 (63.3)	20.2 (68.4)	22.4 (72.3)	22.8 (73.0)	21.7 (71.1)	18.5 (65.3)	14.5 (58.1)	11.8 (53.2)	16.8 (62.3)
Mean daily minimum °C (°F)	8.2 (46.8)	9.0 (48.2)	9.9 (49.8)	11.1 (52.0)	13.0 (55.4)	15.6 (60.1)	17.4 (63.3)	17.7 (63.9)	17.0 (62.6)	14.6 (58.3)	11.2 (52.2)	8.9 (48.0)	12.8 (55.1)
Record low °C (°F)	0.4 (32.7)	1.2 (34.2)	2.9 (37.2)	5.5 (41.9)	6.9 (44.4)	10.2 (50.4)	13.1 (55.6)	13.5 (56.3)	10.7 (51.3)	8.0 (46.4)	3.9 (39.0)	0.5 (32.9)	0.4 (32.7)
Average precipitation mm (inches)	110.0 (4.33)	111.0 (4.37)	69.0 (2.72)	64.0 (2.52)	39.0 (1.54)	21.0 (0.83)	5.0 (0.20)	6.0 (0.24)	26.0 (1.02)	80.0 (3.15)	114.0 (4.49)	108.0 (4.25)	753 (29.66)
Average precipitation days (≥ 1.0 mm)	11.0	11.0	8.0	8.0	6.0	3.0	1.0	1.0	4.0	8.0	10.0	10.0	81
Average relative humidity (%)	80.0	78.0	71.0	69.0	66.0	66.0	63.0	61.0	67.0	72.0	77.0	79.0	70.8
Mean monthly sunshine hours	144.0	151.0	208.0	235.0	291.0	302.0	352.0	343.0	261.0	213.0	157.0	142.0	2,799
Source: NOAA

== See also ==
Climate in other places in Iberian Peninsula:

- Climate of Porto
- Climate of Portugal
- Climate of Barcelona
- Climate of Valencia
- Climate of Madrid
- Climate of Bilbao
