= Climate of Porto =

Porto

Climate chart (precipitation, max. and min. temperature)
J	F	M	A	M	J	J	A	S	O	N	D
147 14 5	111 15 6	96 17 8	118 18 9	90 20 12	40 24 15	20 25 16	33 26 16	72 24 15	158 21 12	172 17 9	181 14 7
- █ Average max. and min. temperatures in °C
- █ Precipitation totals in mm
- Source: Instituto de Meteorologia
Imperial conversion
J	F	M	A	M	J	J	A	S	O	N	D
5.8 57 41	4.4 59 43	3.8 63 46	4.6 65 48	3.5 68 53	1.6 74 58	0.8 78 61	1.3 78 61	2.8 75 58	6.2 69 54	6.8 63 48	7.1 58 44
- █ Average max. and min. temperatures in °F
- █ Precipitation totals in inches

Porto and its metropolitan area feature a Mediterranean climate (Köppen: Csb) with mild wet winters and warm dry summers. According to the Troll-Paffen climate classification, Porto has a warm-temperate subtropical climate (Warmgemäßigt-subtropisches Zonenklima), and a subtropical climate according to Siegmund/Frankenberg. Porto is the wettest major city with a Mediterranean climate.

== Classifications ==
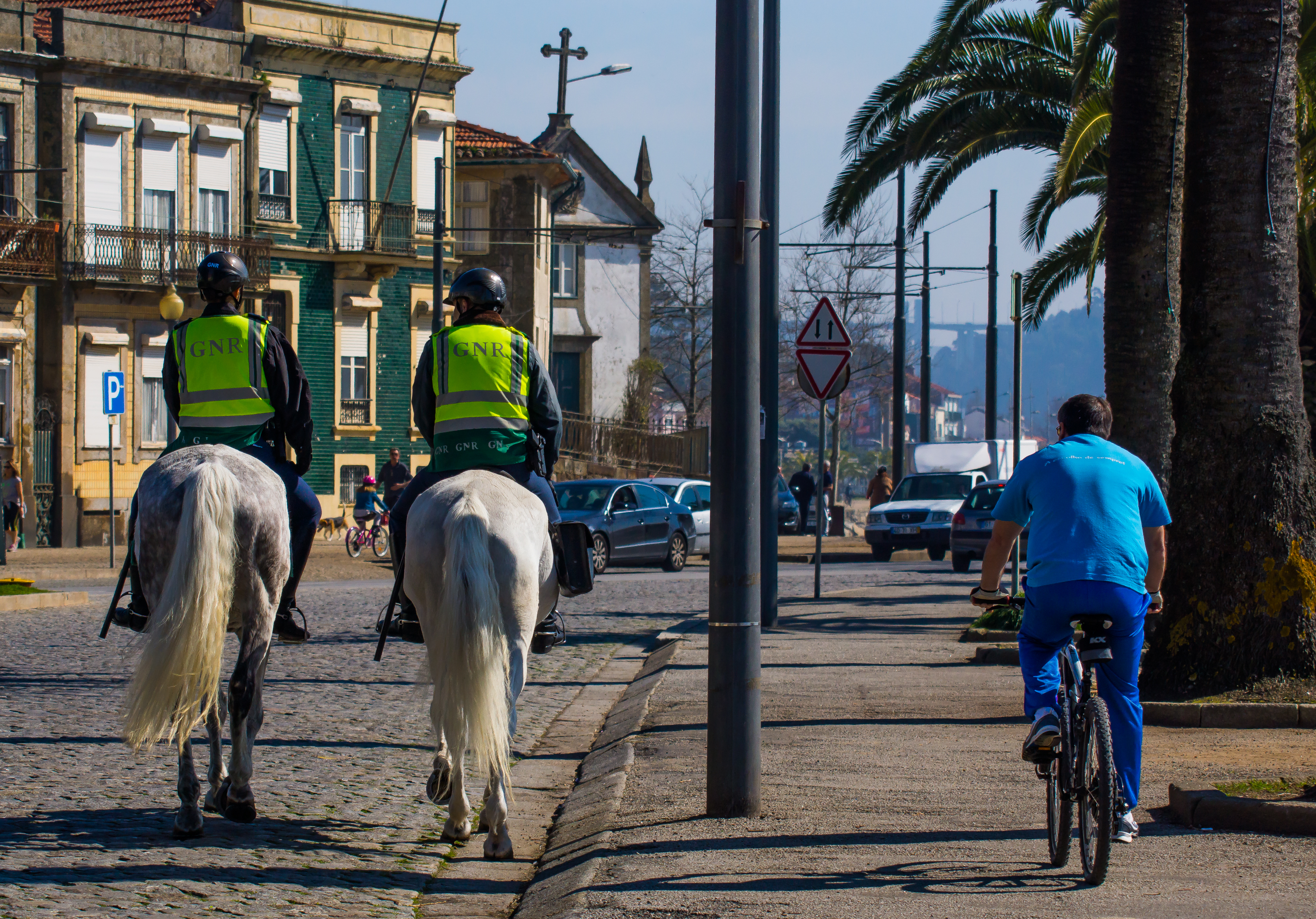
Street in Porto

Porto Climate according to major climate systems
Climatic scheme	Initials	Description
Köppen system	Csb	warm-summer Mediterranean climate
Trewartha system	Cs	Subtropical dry summer
Alisov system	—	Subtropical climate
Strahler system	—	Marine west coast climate
Thornthwaite system	B4 B'2	Humid Mesothermal
Neef system	—	West coast maritime / wet winter climate

== Temperature ==
=== Normals ===
Porto has generally moderate temperatures. The average annual high is around 20 °C (68 °F) and average low around 11 °C (52 °F). The climate is also only mildly seasonal, from a maxima of 14 °C (57 °F) in January to 25–26 °C (77–79 °F) in August, while minima is around 5–6 °C (41–43 °F) in January and 15–16 °C (59–61 °F) in July and August. In its metropolitan area, January lows can vary between 7 °C (45 °F) at the coast and 3 °C (37 °F) on the mountainous interior, and August highs vary between 24 °C (75 °F) at the coast and 28 °C (82 °F) in the interior near the Douro valley.

Climate data for Porto (Fontainhas), elevation: 93 m or 305 ft, 1981-2010 normals
Month	Jan	Feb	Mar	Apr	May	Jun	Jul	Aug	Sep	Oct	Nov	Dec	Year
Mean daily maximum °C (°F)	13.8 (56.8)	15.0 (59.0)	17.4 (63.3)	18.1 (64.6)	20.1 (68.2)	23.5 (74.3)	25.3 (77.5)	25.7 (78.3)	24.1 (75.4)	20.7 (69.3)	17.1 (62.8)	14.4 (57.9)	19.6 (67.3)
Daily mean °C (°F)	9.5 (49.1)	10.4 (50.7)	12.6 (54.7)	13.7 (56.7)	15.9 (60.6)	19.0 (66.2)	20.6 (69.1)	20.8 (69.4)	19.5 (67.1)	16.4 (61.5)	13.0 (55.4)	10.7 (51.3)	15.2 (59.4)
Mean daily minimum °C (°F)	5.2 (41.4)	5.9 (42.6)	7.8 (46.0)	9.1 (48.4)	11.6 (52.9)	14.5 (58.1)	15.9 (60.6)	15.9 (60.6)	14.7 (58.5)	12.2 (54.0)	8.9 (48.0)	6.9 (44.4)	10.7 (51.3)
Source: IPMA

Climate data for Porto (Fontainhas), elevation: 93 m or 305 ft, 1971-2000 normals
Month	Jan	Feb	Mar	Apr	May	Jun	Jul	Aug	Sep	Oct	Nov	Dec	Year
Mean daily maximum °C (°F)	13.5 (56.3)	14.8 (58.6)	16.8 (62.2)	17.7 (63.9)	19.4 (66.9)	22.8 (73.0)	25.0 (77.0)	25.0 (77.0)	23.7 (74.7)	20.4 (68.7)	16.8 (62.2)	14.4 (57.9)	19.2 (66.5)
Daily mean °C (°F)	9.3 (48.7)	10.4 (50.7)	11.9 (53.4)	13.2 (55.8)	15.2 (59.4)	18.3 (64.9)	20.2 (68.4)	20.1 (68.2)	18.9 (66.0)	16.0 (60.8)	12.6 (54.7)	10.6 (51.1)	14.7 (58.5)
Mean daily minimum °C (°F)	5.0 (41.0)	5.9 (42.6)	7.1 (44.8)	8.6 (47.5)	11.0 (51.8)	13.8 (56.8)	15.5 (59.9)	15.2 (59.4)	14.1 (57.4)	11.5 (52.7)	8.3 (46.9)	6.8 (44.2)	10.2 (50.4)
Source: IPMA

Climate data for Porto São Gens, elevation: 90 m or 300 ft, 1971-2000
Month	Jan	Feb	Mar	Apr	May	Jun	Jul	Aug	Sep	Oct	Nov	Dec	Year
Mean daily maximum °C (°F)	13.6 (56.5)	14.6 (58.3)	16.4 (61.5)	17.3 (63.1)	19.0 (66.2)	22.3 (72.1)	24.4 (75.9)	24.5 (76.1)	23.3 (73.9)	20.2 (68.4)	16.9 (62.4)	14.5 (58.1)	18.9 (66.0)
Daily mean °C (°F)	9.7 (49.5)	10.7 (51.3)	12.1 (53.8)	13.1 (55.6)	15.0 (59.0)	17.9 (64.2)	19.8 (67.6)	19.7 (67.5)	18.7 (65.7)	15.9 (60.6)	12.8 (55.0)	10.8 (51.4)	14.7 (58.4)
Mean daily minimum °C (°F)	5.7 (42.3)	6.8 (44.2)	7.8 (46.0)	8.9 (48.0)	11.0 (51.8)	13.5 (56.3)	15.2 (59.4)	14.8 (58.6)	14.1 (57.4)	11.6 (52.9)	8.8 (47.8)	7.1 (44.8)	10.4 (50.8)
Source: IPMA

Climate data for Francisco Sá Carneiro Airport, elevation: 70 m or 230 ft, 1971-2000
Month	Jan	Feb	Mar	Apr	May	Jun	Jul	Aug	Sep	Oct	Nov	Dec	Year
Mean daily maximum °C (°F)	13.8 (56.8)	14.7 (58.5)	16.5 (61.7)	17.3 (63.1)	19.0 (66.2)	22.1 (71.8)	24.1 (75.4)	24.2 (75.6)	23.1 (73.6)	20.1 (68.2)	16.8 (62.2)	14.6 (58.3)	18.9 (66.0)
Daily mean °C (°F)	9.6 (49.3)	10.5 (50.9)	11.9 (53.4)	13.0 (55.4)	14.9 (58.8)	17.7 (63.9)	19.4 (66.9)	19.3 (66.7)	18.4 (65.1)	15.8 (60.4)	12.7 (54.9)	10.8 (51.4)	14.5 (58.1)
Mean daily minimum °C (°F)	5.4 (41.7)	6.4 (43.5)	7.3 (45.1)	8.6 (47.5)	10.8 (51.4)	13.3 (55.9)	14.7 (58.5)	14.4 (57.9)	13.6 (56.5)	11.4 (52.5)	8.6 (47.5)	7.0 (44.6)	10.1 (50.2)
Source: IPMA

=== Extremes ===
Due to its coastal position, temperatures below freezing (0 °C (32 °F)) are rare, and frosts are never severe. Porto is placed in the USDA hardiness zone 10a. The lowest temperature ever recorded in the city was −4.1 °C (24.6 °F) on 11 January 1941.

Climate data for Porto (Fontainhas), elevation: 93 m or 305 ft, 1981-2010
Month	Jan	Feb	Mar	Apr	May	Jun	Jul	Aug	Sep	Oct	Nov	Dec	Year
Record high °C (°F)	23.3 (73.9)	23.2 (73.8)	28.5 (83.3)	30.2 (86.4)	34.1 (93.4)	38.7 (101.7)	40.0 (104.0)	40.9 (105.6)	36.9 (98.4)	32.2 (90.0)	26.3 (79.3)	24.8 (76.6)	40.9 (105.6)
Record low °C (°F)	−3.3 (26.1)	−2.8 (27.0)	−1.6 (29.1)	−0.1 (31.8)	3.3 (37.9)	5.6 (42.1)	9.5 (49.1)	8.0 (46.4)	5.5 (41.9)	1.4 (34.5)	−0.3 (31.5)	−1.2 (29.8)	−3.3 (26.1)
Source: IPMA

Climate data for Porto (Fontainhas), elevation: 93 m or 305 ft, 1971-2000
Month	Jan	Feb	Mar	Apr	May	Jun	Jul	Aug	Sep	Oct	Nov	Dec	Year
Record high °C (°F)	22.3 (72.1)	23.2 (73.8)	28.0 (82.4)	28.9 (84.0)	34.1 (93.4)	38.7 (101.7)	38.3 (100.9)	37.6 (99.7)	36.9 (98.4)	32.2 (90.0)	26.3 (79.3)	24.8 (76.6)	38.7 (101.7)
Record low °C (°F)	−3.3 (26.1)	−2.8 (27.0)	−1.3 (29.7)	0.1 (32.2)	3.3 (37.9)	5.6 (42.1)	9.5 (49.1)	8.0 (46.4)	5.5 (41.9)	1.4 (34.5)	−0.3 (31.5)	−1.2 (29.8)	−3.3 (26.1)
Source: IPMA

Climate data for Porto São Gens, elevation: 90 m or 300 ft, 1971-2000
Month	Jan	Feb	Mar	Apr	May	Jun	Jul	Aug	Sep	Oct	Nov	Dec	Year
Record high °C (°F)	22.0 (71.6)	23.6 (74.5)	27.6 (81.7)	29.0 (84.2)	33.6 (92.5)	39.0 (102.2)	38.0 (100.4)	37.6 (99.7)	36.5 (97.7)	32.5 (90.5)	25.0 (77.0)	25.0 (77.0)	39.0 (102.2)
Record low °C (°F)	−3.0 (26.6)	−2.0 (28.4)	−2.0 (28.4)	0.0 (32.0)	0.5 (32.9)	4.0 (39.2)	8.0 (46.4)	7.0 (44.6)	4.0 (39.2)	1.0 (33.8)	−2.0 (28.4)	−2.5 (27.5)	−3.0 (26.6)
Source: IPMA

Climate data for Francisco Sá Carneiro Airport, elevation: 70 m or 230 ft, 1971-2000
Month	Jan	Feb	Mar	Apr	May	Jun	Jul	Aug	Sep	Oct	Nov	Dec	Year
Record high °C (°F)	23.3 (73.9)	24.4 (75.9)	27.6 (81.7)	28.2 (82.8)	33.5 (92.3)	38.3 (100.9)	37.7 (99.9)	37.1 (98.8)	36.4 (97.5)	31.7 (89.1)	26.3 (79.3)	24.8 (76.6)	38.3 (100.9)
Record low °C (°F)	−3.5 (25.7)	−3.8 (25.2)	−2.6 (27.3)	−0.1 (31.8)	1.5 (34.7)	5.4 (41.7)	8.0 (46.4)	6.1 (43.0)	5.0 (41.0)	1.0 (33.8)	−1.1 (30.0)	−2.5 (27.5)	−3.8 (25.2)
Source: IPMA

== Precipitation ==
Porto has abundant levels of precipitation. Despite averaging above 1,000 mm (39 in) of precipitation a year, July and August are relatively dry with around 15–30 mm (0.59–1.18 in) falling each month. The wettest period is between October and February, mostly between October and December, the wettest month.

Climate data for Porto (Fontainhas), elevation: 93 m or 305 ft, 1981-2010
Month	Jan	Feb	Mar	Apr	May	Jun	Jul	Aug	Sep	Oct	Nov	Dec	Year
Average precipitation mm (inches)	147.1 (5.79)	110.5 (4.35)	95.6 (3.76)	117.6 (4.63)	89.6 (3.53)	39.9 (1.57)	20.4 (0.80)	32.9 (1.30)	71.9 (2.83)	158.3 (6.23)	172.0 (6.77)	181.0 (7.13)	1,237 (48.7)
Source: IPMA

Climate data for Porto (Fontainhas), elevation: 93 m or 305 ft, 1971-2000 normals
Month	Jan	Feb	Mar	Apr	May	Jun	Jul	Aug	Sep	Oct	Nov	Dec	Year
Average precipitation mm (inches)	157.6 (6.20)	139.7 (5.50)	89.9 (3.54)	115.6 (4.55)	97.6 (3.84)	46.0 (1.81)	18.3 (0.72)	26.7 (1.05)	71.0 (2.80)	138.0 (5.43)	158.4 (6.24)	194.7 (7.67)	1,253.5 (49.35)
Source: IPMA

Climate data for Porto São Gens, elevation: 90 m or 300 ft, 1971-2000
Month	Jan	Feb	Mar	Apr	May	Jun	Jul	Aug	Sep	Oct	Nov	Dec	Year
Average precipitation mm (inches)	153.2 (6.03)	136.8 (5.39)	88.0 (3.46)	109.2 (4.30)	92.7 (3.65)	46.2 (1.82)	18.0 (0.71)	23.9 (0.94)	71.6 (2.82)	138.1 (5.44)	160.1 (6.30)	186.5 (7.34)	1,224.3 (48.2)
Source: IPMA

Climate data for Francisco Sá Carneiro Airport, elevation: 70 m or 230 ft, 1971-2000
Month	Jan	Feb	Mar	Apr	May	Jun	Jul	Aug	Sep	Oct	Nov	Dec	Year
Average precipitation mm (inches)	142.4 (5.61)	126.7 (4.99)	81.5 (3.21)	96.4 (3.80)	89.4 (3.52)	42.9 (1.69)	16.5 (0.65)	23.3 (0.92)	61.6 (2.43)	132.1 (5.20)	152.9 (6.02)	181.4 (7.14)	1,147.1 (45.18)
Source: IPMA

== Humidity ==
The average relative humidity is around 77%. 81% from November to January and 73% in the summer. Summer can be slightly muggy in the hottest days but is generally comfortable, as temperatures rarely surpass 30 °C (86 °F).

Climate data for Porto (Fontainhas), elevation: 93 m or 305 ft, 1961-1990
Month	Jan	Feb	Mar	Apr	May	Jun	Jul	Aug	Sep	Oct	Nov	Dec	Year
Average relative humidity (%)	81	80	75	74	74	74	73	73	76	80	81	81	77
Source: NOAA

== Other phenomena ==
=== Sunshine, UV and daylight ===
Despite its precipitation, the total hours of sunshine are relatively normal for a region of its latitude. Winters, especially December, are somewhat dull, and summers are sunny.

Climate data for Porto (Fontainhas), elevation: 93 m or 305 ft, 1961-1990
Month	Jan	Feb	Mar	Apr	May	Jun	Jul	Aug	Sep	Oct	Nov	Dec	Year
Mean monthly sunshine hours	124.0	129.0	192.0	217.0	258.0	274.0	308.0	295.0	224.0	184.0	139.0	124.0	2,468
Mean daily daylight hours	9.6	10.7	12.0	13.3	14.5	15.1	14.8	13.8	12.5	11.1	9.9	9.3	12.2
Percentage possible sunshine	40	42	52	55	55	61	66	68	63	54	46	44	54
Average ultraviolet index	2	3	4	6	7	8	8	8	6	4	2	1	5
Source 1: NOAA
Source 2: Weather Atlas

Climate data for Porto (Fontainhas), elevation: 93 m or 305 ft, 1987-2007
Month	Jan	Feb	Mar	Apr	May	Jun	Jul	Aug	Sep	Oct	Nov	Dec	Year
Mean monthly sunshine hours	142.4	155.0	199.6	221.9	276.4	277.3	302.1	284.8	230.1	162.0	139.3	118.2	2,509.1
Source: German Meteorological Service

=== Wind ===
As a coastal Atlantic city, winds are most predominant in winter. In the summer, nortada winds prevail and can refresh the city in the hottest days. The city centre is sheltered and seldom gets any strong winds.

Average wind speed (km/h) 1971-2000
	Jan	Feb	Mar	Apr	May	Jun	Jul	Aug	Sep	Oct	Nov	Dec	Year
Porto (Fontainhas)	19.6	19.7	19.2	19.0	18.1	16.9	17.3	16.3	15.2	16.8	18.4	20.0	18.0
Porto São Gens	8.6	8.7	8.8	9.0	8.3	7.7	7.4	6.8	6.5	6.5	6.5	6.9	8.4
Porto Pedras Rubras	15.7	16.3	15.0	15.0	14.9	13.5	12.5	12.2	11.9	13.3	14.2	16.3	14.2

== Sea Temperature ==
Average sea temperature, according to seatemperature.org:
Jan	Feb	Mar	Apr	May	Jun	Jul	Aug	Sep	Oct	Nov	Dec	Year
14.3 °C (57.7 °F)	13.8 °C (56.8 °F)	13.8 °C (56.8 °F)	14.9 °C (58.8 °F)	16.2 °C (61.2 °F)	17.2 °C (63.0 °F)	17.3 °C (63.1 °F)	17.9 °C (64.2 °F)	18.3 °C (64.9 °F)	17.8 °C (64.0 °F)	16.8 °C (62.2 °F)	15.4 °C (59.7 °F)	16.1 °C (61.0 °F)

Average sea temperature, according to surf-forecast.com:
Jan	Feb	Mar	Apr	May	Jun	Jul	Aug	Sep	Oct	Nov	Dec	Year
14.5 °C (58.1 °F)	13.5 °C (56.3 °F)	14.0 °C (57.2 °F)	14.5 °C (58.1 °F)	15.5 °C (59.9 °F)	17.5 °C (63.5 °F)	18.5 °C (65.3 °F)	19.0 °C (66.2 °F)	18.5 °C (65.3 °F)	17.5 °C (63.5 °F)	16.0 °C (60.8 °F)	15.5 °C (59.9 °F)	16.2 °C (61.2 °F)

== 1961-1990 data ==
Climate data for Porto (Fontainhas), elevation: 100 m or 330 ft, 1961-1990 normals and extremes
Month	Jan	Feb	Mar	Apr	May	Jun	Jul	Aug	Sep	Oct	Nov	Dec	Year
Record high °C (°F)	22.3 (72.1)	22.7 (72.9)	26.5 (79.7)	27.5 (81.5)	34.7 (94.5)	38.7 (101.7)	38.3 (100.9)	38.2 (100.8)	36.9 (98.4)	32.2 (90.0)	27.7 (81.9)	24.8 (76.6)	38.7 (101.7)
Mean daily maximum °C (°F)	13.5 (56.3)	14.3 (57.7)	16.2 (61.2)	17.5 (63.5)	19.6 (67.3)	22.7 (72.9)	24.7 (76.5)	25.0 (77.0)	24.0 (75.2)	20.9 (69.6)	16.7 (62.1)	13.9 (57.0)	19.1 (66.4)
Daily mean °C (°F)	9.3 (48.7)	10.1 (50.2)	11.5 (52.7)	12.9 (55.2)	15.1 (59.2)	18.1 (64.6)	19.9 (67.8)	19.8 (67.6)	19.0 (66.2)	16.2 (61.2)	12.3 (54.1)	9.9 (49.8)	14.5 (58.1)
Mean daily minimum °C (°F)	5.1 (41.2)	5.9 (42.6)	6.8 (44.2)	8.3 (46.9)	10.6 (51.1)	13.5 (56.3)	15.0 (59.0)	14.6 (58.3)	13.9 (57.0)	11.4 (52.5)	7.9 (46.2)	5.9 (42.6)	9.9 (49.8)
Record low °C (°F)	−3.3 (26.1)	−3.0 (26.6)	−1.8 (28.8)	0.1 (32.2)	2.6 (36.7)	5.6 (42.1)	9.0 (48.2)	8.0 (46.4)	5.5 (41.9)	1.4 (34.5)	−0.6 (30.9)	−2.1 (28.2)	−3.3 (26.1)
Average precipitation mm (inches)	171.0 (6.73)	169.0 (6.65)	112.0 (4.41)	112.0 (4.41)	89.0 (3.50)	53.0 (2.09)	16.0 (0.63)	22.0 (0.87)	64.0 (2.52)	131.0 (5.16)	152.0 (5.98)	176.0 (6.93)	1,267 (49.88)
Average precipitation days (≥ 1.0 mm)	14.0	13.0	11.0	10.0	9.0	6.0	2.0	3.0	6.0	10.0	12.0	12.0	108
Average relative humidity (%)	81.0	80.0	75.0	74.0	74.0	74.0	73.0	73.0	76.0	80.0	81.0	81.0	76.8
Mean monthly sunshine hours	124.0	129.0	192.0	217.0	258.0	274.0	308.0	295.0	224.0	184.0	139.0	124.0	2,468
Source: NOAA
