= Climate of Gibraltar =

The climate of Gibraltar is Mediterranean/Subtropical with mild winters and warm summers. Gibraltar has two main prevailing winds, an easterly one known as the Levante coming from the Sahara in Africa which brings humid weather and warmer sea currents and the other as Poniente which is westerly and brings fresher air and colder sea. Its terrain consists of the 430-metre (1,411 ft) high Rock of Gibraltar and the narrow coastal lowland surrounding it. Rain occurs mainly in winter; the summers are generally dry.

Average morning relative humidity: 82%, evening relative humidity: 64%. Sunshine hours are up to 2,778 per year, from 150 in November (~5 hours of sunshine per day) to 341 in July (~11 hours of sunshine per day).

== Temperature ==
Its average annual temperature is 18.8 °C (65.8 °F): 21.7 °C (71.1 °F) during the day and 15.8 °C (60.4 °F) at night. In the coldest month – January – the typical temperature ranges from 11–18 °C (52–64 °F) during the day and 9–14 °C (48–57 °F) at night (sometimes above and below these temperatures). The average sea temperature is 15–16 °C (59–61 °F). In the warmest month – August – the typical temperature ranges from 25–31 °C (77–88 °F) during the day, and averages 21.2 °C (70.2 °F) at night, and the average sea temperature is 22 °C (72 °F). The average number of days above 21 °C (70 °F) is 181, average number of days above 32 °C (90 °F) is 5–6 (2 in July, 3 in August). The highest temperature ever recorded was 40.6 °C (105.1 °F) on 5 July 1994 while the lowest temperature ever recorded was 0.0 °C (32.0 °F) on 13 January 1978.

Climate data for Gibraltar International Airport (GIB) weather station (ICAO indicator (Note: An ICAO indicator is a unique identifying 4-letter identifier, assigned to airports and airfields. As of September 2018, there were 22,503 ICAO indicator assignments in current use): LXGB, WMO identifier (Note: A WMO identifier is a unique 5-digit numeric code to identify a land weather station. As of September 2018 there were 18,762 WMO identifier assignments in current use.): 08495), 5m amsl (Note: Above mean sea level.), 1991–2020 normals (except dewpoints and humidity), 1985–2015 dewpoints and humidity, extremes 1958–present
Month	Jan	Feb	Mar	Apr	May	Jun	Jul	Aug	Sep	Oct	Nov	Dec	Year
Record high °C (°F)	24.0 (75.2)	24.1 (75.4)	30.3 (86.5)	32.0 (89.6)	33.2 (91.8)	38.0 (100.4)	40.6 (105.1)	40.2 (104.4)	34.5 (94.1)	33.7 (92.7)	29.6 (85.3)	25.0 (77.0)	40.6 (105.1)
Mean daily maximum °C (°F)	16.3 (61.3)	16.7 (62.1)	18.3 (64.9)	20.0 (68.0)	22.6 (72.7)	25.6 (78.1)	28.1 (82.6)	28.4 (83.1)	25.9 (78.6)	22.5 (72.5)	19.1 (66.4)	17.0 (62.6)	21.7 (71.1)
Daily mean °C (°F)	13.8 (56.8)	14.2 (57.6)	15.6 (60.1)	17.0 (62.6)	19.3 (66.7)	22.1 (71.8)	24.3 (75.7)	24.8 (76.6)	22.8 (73.0)	19.9 (67.8)	16.6 (61.9)	14.7 (58.5)	18.8 (65.8)
Mean daily minimum °C (°F)	11.2 (52.2)	11.5 (52.7)	12.7 (54.9)	13.9 (57.0)	16.0 (60.8)	18.5 (65.3)	20.5 (68.9)	21.2 (70.2)	19.7 (67.5)	17.3 (63.1)	14.1 (57.4)	12.4 (54.3)	15.8 (60.4)
Record low °C (°F)	0.0 (32.0)	0.6 (33.1)	2.0 (35.6)	0.0 (32.0)	9.0 (48.2)	9.0 (48.2)	14.4 (57.9)	13.9 (57.0)	12.3 (54.1)	9.0 (48.2)	5.7 (42.3)	0.8 (33.4)	0.0 (32.0)
Average precipitation mm (inches)	97.5 (3.84)	93.6 (3.69)	83.4 (3.28)	68.8 (2.71)	26.9 (1.06)	8.5 (0.33)	0.7 (0.03)	1.1 (0.04)	25.6 (1.01)	84.9 (3.34)	99.1 (3.90)	150.7 (5.93)	740.8 (29.16)
Average precipitation days (≥ 1.0 mm)	7.20	6.36	6.64	6.51	3.74	0.94	0.23	0.20	2.66	6.25	7.34	7.94	56.01
Average relative humidity (%)	75	75	74	72	71	70	71	72	76	79	77	77	74
Average dew point °C (°F)	9 (48)	9 (48)	11 (52)	11 (52)	13 (55)	16 (61)	18 (64)	19 (66)	18 (64)	16 (61)	12 (54)	11 (52)	14 (56)
Mean monthly sunshine hours	147	143	204	233	289	319	326	309	240	197	135	134	2,676
Source 1: Deutscher Wetterdienst (February, July and August record lows only)
Source 2: Meteoclimat (normals except dewpoints and humidity) Source 3: Meteoclimat (records except February, July and August record lows) Source 4: Time and Date (dewpoints and humidity)

== Temperature of sea ==
Average sea temperature, according to seatemperature.org:
Jan	Feb	Mar	Apr	May	Jun	Jul	Aug	Sep	Oct	Nov	Dec	Year
16.3 °C (61.3 °F)	15.8 °C (60.4 °F)	15.7 °C (60.3 °F)	16.9 °C (62.4 °F)	18.5 °C (65.3 °F)	21.0 °C (69.8 °F)	22.8 °C (73.0 °F)	23.3 °C (73.9 °F)	21.8 °C (71.2 °F)	20.5 °C (68.9 °F)	18.3 °C (64.9 °F)	16.8 °C (62.2 °F)	19.0 °C (66.2 °F)

== See also ==
- Climate of Spain
