= Climate of Spain =

Köppen climate types of Spain

The climate of Spain is highly diverse and varies considerably across the country's various regions. In fact, Spain is sometimes described as the most climatically diverse country in Europe and has 13 different Köppen climates.

The four most dominant climates in the country include: The hot-summer Mediterranean climate (Csa), the warm-summer Mediterranean climate (Csb), the semi-arid climate (BSk) and the oceanic climate (Cfb).

The average annual temperature in the mainland varies from less than 2.5 °C (36.5 °F) in the north of the Pyrenees, close to the border with France, to more than 20 °C (68 °F). on small regions of Mediterranean coast on Almeria, Granada and Malaga provinces, reaching as high as 20.6 °C (69.1 °F) in Rincón de la Victoria. The annual average precipitation ranges from more than 2,600 millimetres (100 in) on the northwest of Galicia and in the Pyrenees near San Sebastián to less than 156 millimetres (6.1 in) in southeastern Spain in Cabo de Gata-Níjar Natural Park.

In the Canary Islands, annual average temperature varies from less than 10 °C (50 °F) in the highest altitude area of Santa Cruz de Tenerife to more than 21.5 °C (70.7 °F) on lower areas of Santa Cruz de Tenerife, while the average annual precipitation ranges from more than 1,000 millimetres (39 in) on the highest altitudes of La Palma to less than 100 millimetres (3.9 in) in parts of Lanzarote and Fuerteventura.

Spain, like other countries of the Mediterranean Basin, is vulnerable to climate change, with greater risk of heatwaves and dry weather.

== Zones ==
Four main climatic zones can be distinguished, according to the country's Köppen-Geiger climate classification and orographic conditions:

- The hot-summer Mediterranean climate (Csa) which is also characterized by dry and warm/hot summers and cool to mild and wet winters. According to the Köppen climate classification, this climate is dominant on the Iberian Peninsula, particularly the variety with summer droughts, covering all but the far northern part of the country where the Oceanic climate predominates. The hot-summer Mediterranean climate covers coastal areas (excluding the northern Atlantic coast and southeast Mediterranean coast), the Guadalquivir river basin and the lower reaches of the Tagus and Guadiana basins to the west of the country. It also extends to parts of the interior of the Valencian Community, Castilla-La-Mancha and Catalonia.
- The warm-summer Mediterranean climate (Csb) which predominates in parts of northwestern Spain and mostly inland in central-northern Spain at altitudes above 900-1000 masl.
- The semi-arid climate (BSh and BSk) is predominant in the south eastern part of the country (Almeria province in Eastern Andalusia, Murcia region and Alicante province in Southern Valencia) and in the middle reaches of the Ebro valley to the north east (Zaragoza province), reaching as far west as southern Navarre. It is also present in large areas of the central table lands (primarily in Madrid and in the La Mancha region which includes parts of Cuenca, Guadalajara, and Toledo provinces) and some of the driest areas of Extremadura. In contrast to the Mediterranean climate, the sunny season continues beyond the end of summer and the vegetation is less dense.
- The oceanic climate (Cfb) is located in the northern part of the country, especially in the regions of Galicia, Basque Country, Asturias, Cantabria, and Navarre.

Apart from the four main climate zones, other noticeable sub-zones can be found, such as the humid subtropical climate in large areas in the northern half of Catalonia going down to Barcelona, the province of Huesca and northern Navarre. The warm-summer humid continental climate (Dfb) which can be found in many areas in north-eastern Spain, in areas starting with altitudes above 1000-1100 masl. It can be found also in some areas in the Cantabrian Mountains and the highest areas of the Sistema Ibérico mountain range in central-eastern Spain. The dry continental climates all across Spain in the highest areas (notably in the Sierra Nevada and the highest areas in central-northern Spain), the alpine climate and the Subarctic climate in the higher areas of northern Spain's various mountain ranges (notably the Cantabrian Mountains and the Pyrenees) and a hot desert climate in the southeastern coastline, on Almeria and Murcia provinces. Hot desert climates and hot semi-desert climates can also be found in the Canary Islands, most notably on the islands of Lanzarote and Fuerteventura, but also in the coastal areas of Gran Canaria and in the south of Santa Cruz de Tenerife. On the remaining islands, this climate is also present, but in a much smaller portion. In the coastal areas of the Canary Islands, there are some regions that are influenced by a tropical climate, as the average temperature in the coldest month is above 18 °C (64 °F).

=== Hot summer Mediterranean climate ===
The hot-summer Mediterranean climate (Csa) is found in many parts of Spain's Mediterranean coast, from the border with Portugal to the middle of the province of Granada. Then it starts in Calpe, and goes to the border with France (with some exceptions such as the city of Valencia). It also extends inland in Andalusia and Extremadura. It is characterized by hot, dry summers and mild winters with infrequent frosts. The summers are hot, the winters are mild and most of precipitation falls in the autumn. Examples of cities with Csa climate are Málaga, Barcelona, Palma or Seville.

Climate data for Málaga Airport (AGP), Churriana coordinates 36°39′58″N 04°28′56″W; elevation: 6 m (20 ft); (1991–2020, extremes 1942–present)
Month	Jan	Feb	Mar	Apr	May	Jun	Jul	Aug	Sep	Oct	Nov	Dec	Year
Record high °C (°F)	26.8 (80.2)	30.0 (86.0)	31.4 (88.5)	34.3 (93.7)	35.6 (96.1)	41.0 (105.8)	44.2 (111.6)	44.0 (111.2)	40.0 (104.0)	36.3 (97.3)	30.4 (86.7)	29.9 (85.8)	44.2 (111.6)
Mean daily maximum °C (°F)	17.2 (63.0)	17.9 (64.2)	19.7 (67.5)	21.8 (71.2)	24.7 (76.5)	28.5 (83.3)	31.0 (87.8)	31.5 (88.7)	28.4 (83.1)	24.3 (75.7)	20.2 (68.4)	17.8 (64.0)	23.6 (74.5)
Daily mean °C (°F)	12.5 (54.5)	13.2 (55.8)	14.9 (58.8)	16.8 (62.2)	19.8 (67.6)	23.6 (74.5)	26.1 (79.0)	26.7 (80.1)	23.8 (74.8)	19.9 (67.8)	15.8 (60.4)	13.4 (56.1)	18.9 (66.0)
Mean daily minimum °C (°F)	7.9 (46.2)	8.4 (47.1)	10.1 (50.2)	11.9 (53.4)	14.9 (58.8)	18.6 (65.5)	21.2 (70.2)	22.0 (71.6)	19.2 (66.6)	15.4 (59.7)	11.4 (52.5)	9.1 (48.4)	14.2 (57.5)
Record low °C (°F)	−2.6 (27.3)	−3.8 (25.2)	−1.2 (29.8)	2.8 (37.0)	5.0 (41.0)	9.8 (49.6)	10.0 (50.0)	12.2 (54.0)	10.2 (50.4)	5.6 (42.1)	1.4 (34.5)	−0.8 (30.6)	−3.8 (25.2)
Average precipitation mm (inches)	62.1 (2.44)	56.1 (2.21)	66.0 (2.60)	41.3 (1.63)	23.1 (0.91)	4.4 (0.17)	0.1 (0.00)	2.7 (0.11)	25.2 (0.99)	60.6 (2.39)	77.1 (3.04)	87.7 (3.45)	506.4 (19.94)
Average precipitation days (≥ 0.1 mm)	5.4	4.6	5.1	4.4	3.2	0.6	0.0	0.4	2.3	4.5	5.4	5.6	41.5
Average relative humidity (%)	67	66	65	62	58	56	57	59	63	70	69	71	64
Mean monthly sunshine hours	183	189	223	249	301	336	353	322	261	220	177	161	2,975
Percentage possible sunshine	59	62	60	63	68	77	80	77	70	63	57	54	66
Source: Agencia Estatal de Meteorología

=== Warm summer Mediterranean climate ===
The Csb warm-summer Mediterranean climate is found in parts of Galicia and the western areas of Castilla y Leon. Coastal Mediterranean region is marked by Leveche winds: hot, dry, easterly or southeasterly air currents that originate over North Africa. Periods of these winds, which sometimes carry fine Saharan dust, are more common in spring and are associated with a sudden, usually short-lived, increase in temperature. A cooler easterly wind, the Levante, funnels between the Sistema Penibético and the Atlas Mountains of North Africa. These easterly winds are the ones which most influence the Mediterranean climate. The most populous city with Csb climate in Spain is Vigo. Other cities with this climate are Ávila, León and Salamanca.

It is characterised by year-round mild temperatures with drier summer months, often resulting in moderate drought conditions with at least one month per year usually recording less than 40 mm (1.6 in). Cool ocean currents, upwelling and higher latitudes are often the reason for this cooler type of Mediterranean climate. Winters in this zone are rainy and can be mild to chilly. Some locales in this zone experience some amount of snowfall, while others do not. Annual rainfall is higher than in the eastern and southern regions, usually ranging from 800 to 2,000 mm (31.5 to 78.7 in). Not all Galicia has a Csb climate, most of the north and central mountains have a typical oceanic Cfb. Some valleys in the south are classified as Hot-summer Mediterranean (Csa), like the comarca of O Condado, the city of Ourense or O Ribeiro.

In North-West Castile, the climate is classified also as Csb because the temperatures of summer are cooler due to the altitude.

Climate data for Lugo Airport 445 metres (1,460 ft) (1991–2020)
Month	Jan	Feb	Mar	Apr	May	Jun	Jul	Aug	Sep	Oct	Nov	Dec	Year
Record high °C (°F)	21.3 (70.3)	24.0 (75.2)	27.8 (82.0)	31.8 (89.2)	34.3 (93.7)	36.4 (97.5)	41.2 (106.2)	40.8 (105.4)	37.8 (100.0)	31.9 (89.4)	23.1 (73.6)	23.4 (74.1)	41.2 (106.2)
Mean daily maximum °C (°F)	10.7 (51.3)	12.3 (54.1)	15.1 (59.2)	16.5 (61.7)	19.6 (67.3)	22.7 (72.9)	24.7 (76.5)	25.4 (77.7)	23.1 (73.6)	18.7 (65.7)	13.3 (55.9)	11.1 (52.0)	17.9 (64.2)
Daily mean °C (°F)	6.5 (43.7)	7.1 (44.8)	9.3 (48.7)	10.7 (51.3)	13.6 (56.5)	16.5 (61.7)	18.6 (65.5)	18.8 (65.8)	16.7 (62.1)	13.3 (55.9)	9.2 (48.6)	7.1 (44.8)	12.4 (54.3)
Mean daily minimum °C (°F)	2.4 (36.3)	1.9 (35.4)	3.4 (38.1)	4.8 (40.6)	7.5 (45.5)	10.4 (50.7)	12.4 (54.3)	12.2 (54.0)	10.3 (50.5)	7.9 (46.2)	5.1 (41.2)	3.2 (37.8)	6.9 (44.4)
Record low °C (°F)	−9.2 (15.4)	−11.6 (11.1)	−8.2 (17.2)	−4.6 (23.7)	−1.6 (29.1)	1.0 (33.8)	3.0 (37.4)	1.6 (34.9)	0.6 (33.1)	−2.2 (28.0)	−7.4 (18.7)	−10 (14)	−11.6 (11.1)
Average precipitation mm (inches)	126.5 (4.98)	94.9 (3.74)	100.3 (3.95)	104.9 (4.13)	82.6 (3.25)	51.0 (2.01)	33.3 (1.31)	39.7 (1.56)	67.8 (2.67)	141.0 (5.55)	153.8 (6.06)	141.2 (5.56)	1,137 (44.77)
Average precipitation days (≥ 1.0 mm)	15.1	11.5	12.5	13.8	11.5	6.4	4.7	5.8	8.2	13.6	15.6	14.4	133.1
Mean monthly sunshine hours	85	118	158	169	201	215	234	238	191	144	82	73	1,908
Source: Météo Climat

=== Oceanic climate ===
An oceanic climate prevails from the Pyrenees to Galicia, area which is sometimes called "Green Spain", characterized by relatively mild winters and warm summers. The climate and landscape are determined by the Atlantic Ocean winds whose moisture gets trapped by the mountains circumventing the Spanish Atlantic coast. Because of the Foehn effect, the southern slopes fall inside the rain shadow zone and so Green Spain contrasts starkly with the rest of Spain. The rainfall is generally abundant, exceeding 1,000 mm (39.4 in) and is fairly evenly spread out over the year, with the driest month above 30 mm (1.2 in), which is the minimum criteria for an oceanic climate according to Köppen. Although Köppen officially limits the oceanic domain to the Asturias and the Basque Country region, certain authors such as Trewartha prefer to extend this climatic zone to the north-west part of the peninsula to Galicia, due to the moderate summer temperatures.

Temperatures vary only slightly, both on a diurnal and a seasonal basis, and averages range from 9 °C (48.2 °F) in January to 21 °C (69.8 °F) in July. The moderating effects of the sea are less prominent further inland, where temperatures are more extreme than those on the coast. Distance from the Atlantic Ocean also has an effect on precipitation levels, so there is less rainfall in the east than in the west. Autumn (October to December) is the wettest season, while July is the driest month. The high humidity and the prevailing off-shore winds make fog and mist common along the north west coast; this phenomenon is less frequent a short distance inland because the mountains form a barrier to the maritime moisture.

Climate data for Bilbao airport (1991–2020 normals, extremes 1947-present)
Month	Jan	Feb	Mar	Apr	May	Jun	Jul	Aug	Sep	Oct	Nov	Dec	Year
Record high °C (°F)	24.9 (76.8)	26.8 (80.2)	29.8 (85.6)	33.1 (91.6)	36.0 (96.8)	41.2 (106.2)	42.0 (107.6)	42.9 (109.2)	41.7 (107.1)	33.4 (92.1)	27.6 (81.7)	24.7 (76.5)	42.9 (109.2)
Mean daily maximum °C (°F)	13.5 (56.3)	14.2 (57.6)	16.6 (61.9)	18.1 (64.6)	21.0 (69.8)	23.5 (74.3)	25.4 (77.7)	26.3 (79.3)	24.5 (76.1)	21.5 (70.7)	16.6 (61.9)	14.1 (57.4)	19.6 (67.3)
Daily mean °C (°F)	9.5 (49.1)	9.7 (49.5)	11.6 (52.9)	13.1 (55.6)	16.0 (60.8)	18.7 (65.7)	20.6 (69.1)	21.2 (70.2)	19.2 (66.6)	16.6 (61.9)	12.5 (54.5)	10.1 (50.2)	14.9 (58.8)
Mean daily minimum °C (°F)	5.3 (41.5)	5.1 (41.2)	6.7 (44.1)	8.1 (46.6)	11.0 (51.8)	13.8 (56.8)	15.8 (60.4)	16.1 (61.0)	13.9 (57.0)	11.6 (52.9)	8.3 (46.9)	6.1 (43.0)	10.2 (50.3)
Record low °C (°F)	−7.6 (18.3)	−8.6 (16.5)	−5.0 (23.0)	−1.2 (29.8)	0.4 (32.7)	3.6 (38.5)	6.6 (43.9)	6.8 (44.2)	3.8 (38.8)	0.6 (33.1)	−6.2 (20.8)	−7.4 (18.7)	−8.6 (16.5)
Average precipitation mm (inches)	130 (5.1)	109 (4.3)	98 (3.9)	97 (3.8)	76 (3.0)	58 (2.3)	52 (2.0)	53 (2.1)	75 (3.0)	112 (4.4)	171 (6.7)	127 (5.0)	1,158 (45.6)
Average precipitation days	12.8	11.1	10.5	12.0	10.3	7.2	7.4	7.4	8.9	10.7	13.7	12.4	124.4
Average snowy days	0.3	0.7	0.3	0	0	0	0	0	0	0	0.1	0.3	1.7
Average relative humidity (%)	73	70	68	69	69	71	72	71	72	71	74	73	71
Mean monthly sunshine hours	81	96	136	144	177	180	186	183	162	130	84	81	1,640
Percentage possible sunshine	28	32	36	36	38	39	40	43	43	38	29	28	36
Source 1: Agencia Estatal de Meteorología
Source 2: Agencia Estatal de Meteorología

=== Humid subtropical climate ===
The humid subtropical climate exists in large areas of north-eastern Spain, mostly in the northern half of Catalonia and the province of Huesca. This climate is also found across northern Navarra and the northern areas of the province of Guadalajara. The climate usually occurs in the transition zone between the oceanic climates further north and the mediterranean climates further south. The largest city with this climate in Spain is Girona.

This type of humid subtropical climate is atypical for normal humid subtropical climates, with there not being the characteristic inflow of warm, moist air during summer causing convective thunderstorms but is nonetheless classified as humid subtropical by Köppen.

Climate data for Girona Airport (1991-2020), extremes (1973-present)
Month	Jan	Feb	Mar	Apr	May	Jun	Jul	Aug	Sep	Oct	Nov	Dec	Year
Record high °C (°F)	24.6 (76.3)	25.8 (78.4)	29.0 (84.2)	31.6 (88.9)	37.3 (99.1)	43.0 (109.4)	41.3 (106.3)	42.5 (108.5)	37.0 (98.6)	33.1 (91.6)	30.0 (86.0)	23.5 (74.3)	43.0 (109.4)
Mean daily maximum °C (°F)	13.7 (56.7)	14.7 (58.5)	17.4 (63.3)	19.6 (67.3)	23.3 (73.9)	27.8 (82.0)	30.6 (87.1)	30.7 (87.3)	26.6 (79.9)	22.4 (72.3)	17.1 (62.8)	14.1 (57.4)	21.5 (70.7)
Daily mean °C (°F)	7.5 (45.5)	8.2 (46.8)	10.8 (51.4)	13.1 (55.6)	16.8 (62.2)	21.1 (70.0)	23.9 (75.0)	24.0 (75.2)	20.3 (68.5)	16.5 (61.7)	11.2 (52.2)	8.1 (46.6)	15.1 (59.2)
Mean daily minimum °C (°F)	1.3 (34.3)	1.6 (34.9)	4.1 (39.4)	6.5 (43.7)	10.2 (50.4)	14.4 (57.9)	17.1 (62.8)	17.2 (63.0)	14.0 (57.2)	10.6 (51.1)	5.3 (41.5)	2.0 (35.6)	8.7 (47.7)
Record low °C (°F)	−13.0 (8.6)	−8.2 (17.2)	−5.8 (21.6)	−3.0 (26.6)	0.6 (33.1)	5.1 (41.2)	8.0 (46.4)	8.4 (47.1)	4.6 (40.3)	−2.0 (28.4)	−7.0 (19.4)	−9.4 (15.1)	−13.0 (8.6)
Average precipitation mm (inches)	58 (2.3)	42 (1.7)	51 (2.0)	66 (2.6)	65 (2.6)	58 (2.3)	40 (1.6)	49 (1.9)	75 (3.0)	86 (3.4)	63 (2.5)	51 (2.0)	704 (27.9)
Average precipitation days (≥ 1 mm)	4.8	4.4	5.2	7.2	7.1	5.1	3.8	5.1	6.5	6.6	5.1	4.1	65
Average snowy days	0.2	0.5	0.1	0	0	0	0	0	0	0	0	0.1	0.9
Average relative humidity (%)	74	71	70	68	66	60	58	62	70	75	75	76	69
Mean monthly sunshine hours	155	167	195	204	229	255	288	273	210	183	153	143	2,455
Percentage possible sunshine	52	55	53	51	51	56	62	64	56	53	52	50	55
Source: Agencia Estatal de Meteorología

=== Semi-arid climates ===
The semi-arid climate (BSh and BSk in the Köppen climate classification) is predominant in south-eastern Spain (covering most of Alicante, Murcia and Almería provinces), and in certain parts of the Ebro Valley. It is also present in parts of the centre (Madrid, Toledo, Ciudad Real and Albacete provinces), south and west of the country which borders between a Mediterranean and semi-arid climate. It is very hot during the summer (temperatures can exceed 40 °C (104 °F)) and the drought usually extends into the autumn. Rainfall in these areas are usually between 200 mm and 500 mm.

Climate data for Murcia (1991–2020), extremes (1984–)
Month	Jan	Feb	Mar	Apr	May	Jun	Jul	Aug	Sep	Oct	Nov	Dec	Year
Record high °C (°F)	28.7 (83.7)	29.4 (84.9)	33.6 (92.5)	37.4 (99.3)	41.0 (105.8)	42.5 (108.5)	45.7 (114.3)	46.2 (115.2)	44.6 (112.3)	35.5 (95.9)	31.0 (87.8)	27.2 (81.0)	46.2 (115.2)
Mean daily maximum °C (°F)	17.2 (63.0)	18.5 (65.3)	21.1 (70.0)	23.6 (74.5)	27.2 (81.0)	31.5 (88.7)	34.3 (93.7)	34.5 (94.1)	30.5 (86.9)	26.1 (79.0)	20.7 (69.3)	17.6 (63.7)	25.2 (77.4)
Daily mean °C (°F)	11.3 (52.3)	12.4 (54.3)	14.8 (58.6)	17.2 (63.0)	20.7 (69.3)	24.9 (76.8)	27.8 (82.0)	28.1 (82.6)	24.6 (76.3)	20.3 (68.5)	15.0 (59.0)	12.0 (53.6)	19.1 (66.4)
Mean daily minimum °C (°F)	5.3 (41.5)	6.3 (43.3)	8.4 (47.1)	10.7 (51.3)	14.2 (57.6)	18.2 (64.8)	21.2 (70.2)	21.8 (71.2)	18.6 (65.5)	14.6 (58.3)	9.4 (48.9)	6.3 (43.3)	12.9 (55.2)
Record low °C (°F)	−7.5 (18.5)	−3.9 (25.0)	−2.4 (27.7)	0.0 (32.0)	4.0 (39.2)	8.0 (46.4)	13.0 (55.4)	14.0 (57.2)	9.6 (49.3)	4.4 (39.9)	−1.0 (30.2)	−6.0 (21.2)	−7.5 (18.5)
Average precipitation mm (inches)	26.7 (1.05)	18.9 (0.74)	30.3 (1.19)	29.5 (1.16)	20.5 (0.81)	16.5 (0.65)	1.2 (0.05)	11.9 (0.47)	37.6 (1.48)	27.3 (1.07)	29.0 (1.14)	32.5 (1.28)	281.9 (11.09)
Average precipitation days (≥ 1 mm)	3.2	3.1	3.5	3.8	3.0	1.8	0.3	1.3	3.0	3.8	4.0	3.2	34
Average snowy days	0.1	0	0	0	0	0	0	0	0	0	0	0	0.1
Average relative humidity (%)	63	60	57	53	50	48	49	53	59	63	64	66	57
Mean monthly sunshine hours	198	198	229	261	310	342	366	326	249	226	192	180	3,077
Percentage possible sunshine	65	65	62	66	70	77	81	78	67	65	63	60	68
Source: Agencia Estatal de Meteorología

=== Desert climate ===
The desert climate exists in a few heavily rain-shadowed zones of the south-eastern coast of Spain and in many parts of the Canary Islands. Within mainland Spain, it appears predominantly in Almería, with the city of Almería bordering a hot desert climate categorization (Köppen: BWh) as the average temperature is 19.1 °C (66.4 °F) and the average precipitation is approximately 200mm. This area extends to the Andarax and Almanzora river valleys and the Cabo de Gata-Níjar Natural Park, which are also known for having also a hot desert climate (Köppen: BWh), with a precipitation amount of 156 mm (6.1 in) per year which is reportedly the driest place in Europe. In fact, Almeria, Murcia and Alicante provinces are the only areas in Europe within the hot desert climatic zone. The desert climate exists in other areas of the southeast, such as the Tabernas Desert. It also exists in areas of Murcia and specific points inland of the province of Alicante.

Climate data for Almería (Almería Airport) elevation: 21 m (69 ft); (1991–2020) extremes (1933–present)
Month	Jan	Feb	Mar	Apr	May	Jun	Jul	Aug	Sep	Oct	Nov	Dec	Year
Record high °C (°F)	25.7 (78.3)	27.0 (80.6)	32.4 (90.3)	32.1 (89.8)	36.3 (97.3)	40.8 (105.4)	41.6 (106.9)	42.0 (107.6)	38.4 (101.1)	34.5 (94.1)	29.0 (84.2)	27.7 (81.9)	42.0 (107.6)
Mean daily maximum °C (°F)	17.0 (62.6)	17.6 (63.7)	19.4 (66.9)	21.3 (70.3)	24.3 (75.7)	27.8 (82.0)	30.5 (86.9)	31.2 (88.2)	28.2 (82.8)	24.5 (76.1)	20.3 (68.5)	17.9 (64.2)	23.3 (73.9)
Daily mean °C (°F)	12.8 (55.0)	13.4 (56.1)	15.1 (59.2)	17.1 (62.8)	20.1 (68.2)	23.6 (74.5)	26.4 (79.5)	27.2 (81.0)	24.2 (75.6)	20.6 (69.1)	16.3 (61.3)	13.9 (57.0)	19.2 (66.6)
Mean daily minimum °C (°F)	8.7 (47.7)	9.2 (48.6)	10.9 (51.6)	12.9 (55.2)	15.8 (60.4)	19.3 (66.7)	22.2 (72.0)	23.1 (73.6)	20.2 (68.4)	16.6 (61.9)	12.3 (54.1)	9.8 (49.6)	15.1 (59.2)
Record low °C (°F)	0.1 (32.2)	1.0 (33.8)	1.0 (33.8)	6.0 (42.8)	8.4 (47.1)	10.4 (50.7)	12.0 (53.6)	14.8 (58.6)	10.1 (50.2)	3.4 (38.1)	3.1 (37.6)	2.0 (35.6)	0.1 (32.2)
Average precipitation mm (inches)	20.8 (0.82)	23.3 (0.92)	20.7 (0.81)	15.2 (0.60)	10.9 (0.43)	5.5 (0.22)	0.6 (0.02)	2.3 (0.09)	16.1 (0.63)	25.2 (0.99)	25.1 (0.99)	31.8 (1.25)	197.5 (7.78)
Average precipitation days (≥ 1 mm)	2.7	2.7	3.1	2.6	1.6	0.6	0.2	0.3	1.9	3.1	3.2	3.0	25
Average relative humidity (%)	66	65	65	63	61	61	60	62	65	68	66	67	64
Mean monthly sunshine hours	195	198	242	270	307	336	353	329	261	226	192	186	3,095
Percentage possible sunshine	63	65	65	68	70	77	79	78	70	65	63	62	69
Source: Agencia Estatal de Meteorologia (AEMET OpenData)

=== Other types ===
Besides the above three major climate zones, there are four other climate types in Spain:

- The mountainous climate is present in the Picos de Europa, Sistema Central, Sistema Ibérico, Pyrenees and Sierra Nevada, qualified as an Alpine climate, Spain's major mountain systems.
- The low-lying areas of the Canary Islands have influences of tropical climate in terms of temperature, this being mild and stable (18 to 26 °C or 64 to 79 °F) throughout the year. Most of the islands have hot desert climates or hot semi-desert climates, and a low altitude areas have tropical steppe climates, like the cities of Santa Cruz de Tenerife, Las Palmas de Gran Canaria or La Palma. In terms of precipitation, the eastern islands are arid while the westernmost ones are semi-arid and receive more rainfall, with some very wet areas in the mountains of La Gomera, La Palma and Tenerife, home to the cloud forest known as laurisilva. The easternmost islands are arid with Saharan climate moderated by the Atlantic Ocean.

The southernmost coast of Spain (Málaga and Granada's coastal strip) has the warmest winters across Europe, with very sunny and mostly warm days with total absence of winter frosts allowing for the prolific cultivation of tropical fruits such as mango, papaya, cherimoya, pitaya and the carambola, amongst others. The benign winter, with minimum night temperatures in January rarely falling below 5 °C (46 °F) is due to the microclimate created by the Sierra Nevada mountains to the north of this coastal strip, preventing cooler north winds from reaching the area.

== Percentage of predominant climates and diversity ==
According to AEMET, the climate in Spain is extremely diverse, due to its very diverse orography. In total, there are 13 Köppen climate types in Spain, with the polar tundra type (ET) becoming extinct from the period 1981-2010. These are the climates that are found in majority of Spain:

- Mediterranean climate (Cs): Predominates the country and occupies around 60.2% of the territory. It is characterized by dry (warm or hot) summers and mild, rainy winters. The hot summer (Csa) is more extensive compared to the warm summer (Csb).
- Semi-arid climate (Bs): It is present in a significant part, occupying around 21.3% of the country. It is predominant in the southeast, but also in a significant portion of the country's interior, such as the Meseta Central. The cold semi-arid (BSk) is much more extensive than the hot semi-arid (BSh). However, the hot semi-arid still occupies more than 1% of the territory, which is significant compared to continental climates that occupy a smaller percentage. Spain has the largest semi-arid areas on the European continent.
- Temperate climate without dry season (Cf): The oceanic climate (Cfb) and the humid subtropical (Cfa) also occupy a significant portion, although in a smaller percentage. Around 17.4% has the Cf climate, with the oceanic climate accounting for around 13% and the humid subtropical climate accounting for around 4.4%. It is predominant in the north of Spain, with mild winters and warm summers (or hot in the case of Cfa) and it is rainy throughout the year.

In addition to these, the continental climates with dry summer Dsa, Dsb, Dsc and no dry season Dfb and Dfc are also present. The hot desert climate (BWh) and the cold desert climate (BWk) occupy around 0.3% of the territory and are only present in the southeast of the country.

=== Canary Islands ===
In the Canary Islands, arid and semi-arid climates predominate, but there is also a significant portion with a Mediterranean climate:

- Desert climate (BW): It occupies around 48.1% of the territory, with the hot arid (BWh) being significantly more extensive than the cold arid (BWk).
- Semi-arid climate (BS): It occupies around 21.4%, with the hot semi-arid (BSh) being more extensive than the cold semi-arid (BSk).
- Mediterranean climate (Cs): Occupies around 30.5%, with the warm summer Mediterranean (Csb) being more extensive than the hot summer Mediterranean (Csa).

Also present are extremely small areas that have a dry summer continental climate (Ds).

A very limited area, located right at the eastern coastline of La Palma can be described as closely bordering on wet and dry tropical climate with dry season experienced during high sun months (As), given the mean temperature of the coldest month of the year is generally at or slightly above 18 °C at sea level, and the average yearly amount of precipitation results in a borderline non-arid climate by Köppen's definition.

== Climate change ==
Climate change has caused temperatures in the world to rise in the last few decades, and temperatures in Europe have risen twice as fast as the average change in the rest of the world. In Spain, which already has a hot and dry climate, extreme events such as heatwaves are becoming increasingly frequent. The country is also experiencing more episodes of drought and increased severity of these episodes. Water resources will be severely affected in various climate change scenarios. Also, the mediterranean climate (Köppen: Csa), as well as other temperate climates in the country, is becoming less and less common, being replaced by the semi-arid climate (Köppen: BSk/BSh) and even the expansion of desert regions. Some forecasts indicate that the semi-arid climate will be the most common in Spain by 2050.

To mitigate the effects of climate change, Spain is promoting an energy transition to renewable energies, such as solar and wind energy. In 2021, to support this process, the government approved a law on climate change and energy transition.

Spanish society as a whole is one of the most climate change conscious societies in the EU. Due to the effects of global warming, Spanish society is demanding stronger measures.

== Temperature averages for Spanish mainland cities ==
=== Atlantic (Northern) Spain ===
Average daily maximum and minimum temperatures for selected cities in Atlantic Spain
Location	Coldest month	April	Warmest month	October
A Coruña	13.5 / 8.1 (56.3 / 46.6)	16.2 / 9.9 (61.2 / 49.8)	22.8 / 16.4 (73.0 / 61.5)	19.1 / 13.0 (66.4 / 55.4)
Bilbao	13.4 / 5.1 (56.1 / 41.2)	17.6 / 7.6 (63.7 / 45.7)	26.0 / 15.7 (78.8 / 60.3)	21.4 / 11.4 (70.5 / 52.5)
Gijón	13.1 / 4.7 (55.6 / 40.5)	15.6 / 8.1 (60.1 / 46.6)	23.2 / 16.2 (73.8 / 61.2)	19.0 / 11.0 (66.2 / 51.8)
Oviedo	12.0 / 4.6 (53.6 / 40.3)	15.7 / 6.8 (60.3 / 44.2)	23.3 / 14.8 (73.9 / 58.6)	18.7 / 10.4 (65.7 / 50.7)
Santander	13.6 / 5.8 (56.5 / 42.4)	16.6 / 8.3 (61.9 / 46.9)	24.2 / 16.4 (75.6 / 61.5)	20.3 / 11.8 (68.5 / 53.2)
Vigo	11.9 / 5.4 (53.4 / 41.7)	16.6 / 8.2 (61.9 / 46.8)	24.7 / 15.0 (76.5 / 59.0)	18.8 / 11.2 (65.8 / 52.2)
Vitoria	8.7 / 1.2 (47.7 / 34.2)	15.4 / 4.1 (59.7 / 39.4)	25.9 / 12.5 (78.6 / 54.5)	18.3 / 7.5 (64.9 / 45.5)

=== Continental Spain ===
Average daily maximum and minimum temperatures for selected cities in Continental Spain
Location	Coldest month	April	Warmest month	October
Albacete	10.5 / −0.2 (50.9 / 31.6)	18.4 / 5.4 (65.1 / 41.7)	33.2 / 16.9 (91.8 / 62.4)	24.9 / 14.5 (76.8 / 58.1)
Córdoba	14.9 / 3.6 (58.8 / 38.5)	22.8 / 9.3 (73.0 / 48.7)	36.9 / 19.0 (98.4 / 66.2)	25.1 / 13.0 (77.2 / 55.4)
Madrid	9.8 / 2.7 (49.6 / 36.9)	18.2 / 7.7 (64.8 / 45.9)	32.1 / 19.0 (89.8 / 66.2)	19.4 / 10.7 (66.9 / 51.3)
Murcia	16.6 / 4.7 (61.9 / 40.5)	23.3 / 9.7 (73.9 / 49.5)	34.2 / 20.9 (93.6 / 69.6)	25.6 / 13.9 (78.1 / 57.0)
Seville	16.0 / 5.7 (60.8 / 42.3)	23.4 / 11.1 (74.1 / 52.0)	36.0 / 20.3 (96.8 / 68.5)	26.0 / 14.4 (78.8 / 57.9)
Valladolid	8.2 / 0.2 (46.8 / 32.4)	16.9 / 4.6 (62.4 / 40.3)	30.7 / 14.0 (87.3 / 57.2)	18.9 / 7.6 (66.0 / 45.7)
Zaragoza	10.5 / 2.7 (50.9 / 36.9)	19.6 / 7.9 (67.3 / 46.2)	32.4 / 18.3 (90.3 / 64.9)	21.4 / 11.0 (70.5 / 51.8)

=== Mediterranean Spain ===
Average daily maximum and minimum temperatures for selected cities in Mediterranean Spain
Location	Coldest month	April	Warmest month	October
Alicante	17.0 / 6.7 (62.6 / 44.1)	21.3 / 10.9 (70.3 / 51.6)	30.8 / 21.5 (87.4 / 70.7)	24.9 / 14.9 (76.8 / 58.8)
Almería	16.9 / 8.3 (62.4 / 46.9)	21.4 / 12.5 (70.5 / 54.5)	31.0 / 22.4 (87.8 / 72.3)	24.5 / 16.3 (76.1 / 61.3)
Barcelona	14.8 / 8.8 (58.6 / 47.8)	19.1 / 12.5 (66.4 / 54.5)	29.0 / 23.1 (84.2 / 73.6)	22.5 / 16.5 (72.5 / 61.7)
Castellón de la Plana	15.3 / 5.8 (59.5 / 42.4)	20.5 / 10.3 (68.9 / 50.5)	30.3 / 20.9 (86.5 / 69.6)	23.5 / 14.4 (74.3 / 57.9)
Málaga	16.8 / 7.4 (62.2 / 45.3)	21.4 / 11.1 (70.5 / 52.0)	30.8 / 21.1 (87.4 / 70.0)	24.1 / 15.0 (75.4 / 59.0)
Valencia	16.4 / 7.1 (61.5 / 44.8)	20.8 / 11.5 (69.4 / 52.7)	30.2 / 21.9 (86.4 / 71.4)	24.4 / 15.2 (75.9 / 59.4)

== Temperature averages for Spanish non-mainland cities ==
Average daily maximum and minimum temperatures for selected cities in the Canaries
Location	Coldest month	April	Warmest month	October
El Hierro Airport	20.8 / 16.4 (69.4 / 61.5)	21.6 / 17.0 (70.9 / 62.6)	26.5 / 21.7 (79.7 / 71.1)	25.6 / 20.9 (78.1 / 69.6)
Gran Canaria	20.8 / 15.0 (69.4 / 59.0)	22.6 / 16.2 (72.7 / 61.2)	27.5 / 21.6 (81.5 / 70.9)	26.2 / 20.1 (79.2 / 68.2)
La Laguna	16.0 / 10.2 (60.8 / 50.4)	18.5 / 10.9 (65.3 / 51.6)	25.7 / 16.6 (78.3 / 61.9)	22.5 / 15.2 (72.5 / 59.4)
Los Cancajos	20.7 / 15.3 (69.3 / 59.5)	21.6 / 16.2 (70.9 / 61.2)	26.6 / 21.3 (79.9 / 70.3)	25.5 / 20.2 (77.9 / 68.4)
Santa Cruz	21.0 / 15.4 (69.8 / 59.7)	22.7 / 16.5 (72.9 / 61.7)	29.0 / 21.9 (84.2 / 71.4)	26.3 / 20.3 (79.3 / 68.5)

Average daily maximum and minimum temperatures for selected cities in the Balearic Islands
Location	Coldest month	April	Warmest month	October
Ibiza	15.7 / 8.1 (60.3 / 46.6)	19.7 / 11.4 (67.5 / 52.5)	30.3 / 22.2 (86.5 / 72.0)	24.0 / 16.5 (75.2 / 61.7)
Palma	15.4 / 8.3 (59.7 / 46.9)	19.2 / 11.7 (66.6 / 53.1)	29.8 / 22.5 (85.6 / 72.5)	23.7 / 16.6 (74.7 / 61.9)
Menorca Airport	14.2 / 7.4 (57.6 / 45.3)	18.0 / 10.6 (64.4 / 51.1)	29.2 / 21.5 (84.6 / 70.7)	22.7 / 16.1 (72.9 / 61.0)

== Extreme temperature records in selected cities ==
Nationwide, the official lowest temperature ever reported in Spain is −32.0 °C (−25.6 °F) in Estany Gento, Province of Lleida on 2 February 1956; although in recent years lower temperatures have been recorded by stations not belonging to AEMET, the lowest being −35.8 °C (−32.4 °F) at Vega de Liordes, in the Picos de Europa.
Conversely, the highest, officially, is 47.6 °C (117.7 °F) at La Rambla, Córdoba on 14 August 2021.

Location	Record highs	Record lows
Mediterranean		
La Rambla, province of Córdoba	47.6 °C (117.7 °F)	—
Montoro, Córdoba	47.4 °C (117.3 °F)	—
Córdoba	46.9 °C (116.4 °F)	−8.2 °C (17.2 °F)
Seville	46.6 °C (115.9 °F)	−5.5 °C (22.1 °F)
Granada	46 °C (115 °F)	−14.2 °C (6.4 °F)
Málaga	44.2 °C (111.6 °F)	−3.8 °C (25.2 °F)
Continental		
Zaragoza	44.5 °C (112.1 °F)	−14 °C (7 °F)
Albacete	42.7 °C (108.9 °F)	−24.0 °C (−11.2 °F)
Teruel	41.3 °C (106.3 °F)	−21 °C (−6 °F)
Valladolid	41.1 °C (106.0 °F)	−11.5 °C (11.3 °F)
Northern Atlantic		
Ourense	44.1 °C (111.4 °F)	−8.6 °C (16.5 °F)
Bilbao	44 °C (111 °F)	−8.6 °C (16.5 °F)
A Coruña	39.6 °C (103.3 °F)	−3.0 °C (26.6 °F)
Oviedo	39 °C (102 °F)	−6.0 °C (21.2 °F)
Vigo	40.8 °C (105.4 °F)	−5.0 °C (23.0 °F)

== Sea temperature ==
Bilbao
Jan	Feb	Mar	Apr	May	Jun	Jul	Aug	Sep	Oct	Nov	Dec	Year
13 °C (55 °F)	12 °C (54 °F)	12 °C (54 °F)	13 °C (55 °F)	15 °C (59 °F)	18 °C (64 °F)	20 °C (68 °F)	21 °C (70 °F)	20 °C (68 °F)	18 °C (64 °F)	15 °C (59 °F)	13 °C (55 °F)	15.8 °C (60.4 °F)

Barcelona
Jan	Feb	Mar	Apr	May	Jun	Jul	Aug	Sep	Oct	Nov	Dec	Year
13 °C (55 °F)	13 °C (55 °F)	13 °C (55 °F)	14 °C (57 °F)	17 °C (63 °F)	20 °C (68 °F)	23 °C (73 °F)	25 °C (77 °F)	23 °C (73 °F)	20 °C (68 °F)	17 °C (63 °F)	15 °C (59 °F)	18 °C (64 °F)

Valencia
Jan	Feb	Mar	Apr	May	Jun	Jul	Aug	Sep	Oct	Nov	Dec	Year
14 °C (57 °F)	13 °C (55 °F)	13 °C (55 °F)	15 °C (59 °F)	17 °C (63 °F)	21 °C (70 °F)	24 °C (75 °F)	26 °C (79 °F)	24 °C (75 °F)	21 °C (70 °F)	18 °C (64 °F)	15 °C (59 °F)	18.5 °C (65.3 °F)

Alicante
Jan	Feb	Mar	Apr	May	Jun	Jul	Aug	Sep	Oct	Nov	Dec	Year
14 °C (57 °F)	14 °C (57 °F)	14 °C (57 °F)	15 °C (59 °F)	17 °C (63 °F)	21 °C (70 °F)	24 °C (75 °F)	25 °C (77 °F)	24 °C (75 °F)	21 °C (70 °F)	18 °C (64 °F)	16 °C (61 °F)	18.6 °C (65.5 °F)

Gibraltar/Algeciras area
Jan	Feb	Mar	Apr	May	Jun	Jul	Aug	Sep	Oct	Nov	Dec	Year
16 °C (61 °F)	15 °C (59 °F)	16 °C (61 °F)	16 °C (61 °F)	17 °C (63 °F)	19 °C (66 °F)	22 °C (72 °F)	22 °C (72 °F)	22 °C (72 °F)	20 °C (68 °F)	18 °C (64 °F)	17 °C (63 °F)	18.4 °C (65.1 °F)

Las Palmas
Jan	Feb	Mar	Apr	May	Jun	Jul	Aug	Sep	Oct	Nov	Dec	Year
19 °C (66 °F)	19 °C (66 °F)	19 °C (66 °F)	19 °C (66 °F)	20 °C (68 °F)	21 °C (70 °F)	22 °C (72 °F)	23 °C (73 °F)	23 °C (73 °F)	23 °C (73 °F)	22 °C (72 °F)	20 °C (68 °F)	20.9 °C (69.6 °F)

== See also ==
- Climate of Barcelona
- Climate of Valencia
- Climate of Madrid
- Climate of Bilbao
- Climate of Gibraltar
- Wave height
- Western Mediterranean oscillation
