= Climate change in Spain =

Climate change has caused temperatures in the world to rise in the last few decades, and temperatures in Europe have risen twice as fast as the average change in the rest of the world. In Spain, which already has a hot and dry climate, extreme events such as heatwaves are becoming increasingly frequent. The country is also experiencing more episodes of drought and increased severity of these episodes. Water resources will be severely affected in various climate change scenarios. Also, the mediterranean climate (Köppen: Csa), as well as other temperate climates in the country, is becoming less and less common, being replaced by the semi-arid climate (Köppen: BSk/BSh) and even the expansion of desert regions. Some forecasts indicate that the semi-arid climate will be the most common in Spain by 2050.

To mitigate the effects of climate change, Spain is promoting an energy transition to renewable energies, such as solar and wind energy. In 2021, to support this process, the government approved a law on climate change and energy transition.

Spanish society as a whole is one of the most climate change conscious societies in the EU. Due to the effects of global warming, Spanish society is demanding stronger measures.

== Greenhouse gas emissions ==
Annual Greenhouse gas emissions (not including land use change)

Four sectors generate 90% of emissions: transport, industry, agriculture and energy.

Greenhouse gas emissions by sector

Per capita CO_{2} emissions (not including land use change) were 5 tonnes in 2021. Spain accounts for 9% of the total CO_{2} emissions in the European Union. CO_{2} emissions are dominated by the combustion of fossil fuels for transport and electricity generation, and by the industrial production of materials such as cement.

=== Fossil fuels ===
A large part of Spain's energy demand comes from fossil fuels, which account for over 70% of the total. In 2021 oil was responsible for 60% of the emissions and natural gas 30% of emissions.

=== Transportation ===
Greenhouse gas emissions are the highest in the transportation sector, accounting for 27% of total GHG emissions. Of that, 90% of emissions come from road transport, with light-duty vehicles, such as passenger cars and motorbikes, contributing 66% and heavy trucks and buses accounting for the remaining 34%.

=== Electricity generation ===
Spain is considered an energy island, as its electricity import and export capacity is very limited, at 2.8 GW with France and 3.70 GW with Portugal.

In 2022 coal-fired power plants emitted 15% of the CO_{2} from electricity generation, but these will be shut down by 2030. Almost all the rest is from gas-fired power plants.

In the Balearic Islands electricity production is mainly natural gas and some solar energy, while the Canary Islands produce almost all their electricity with oil.

=== Agriculture and waste ===
Agriculture produces two potent greenhouse gasses: nitrous oxide and methane.

== Impacts on the natural environment ==
=== Temperature and weather changes ===
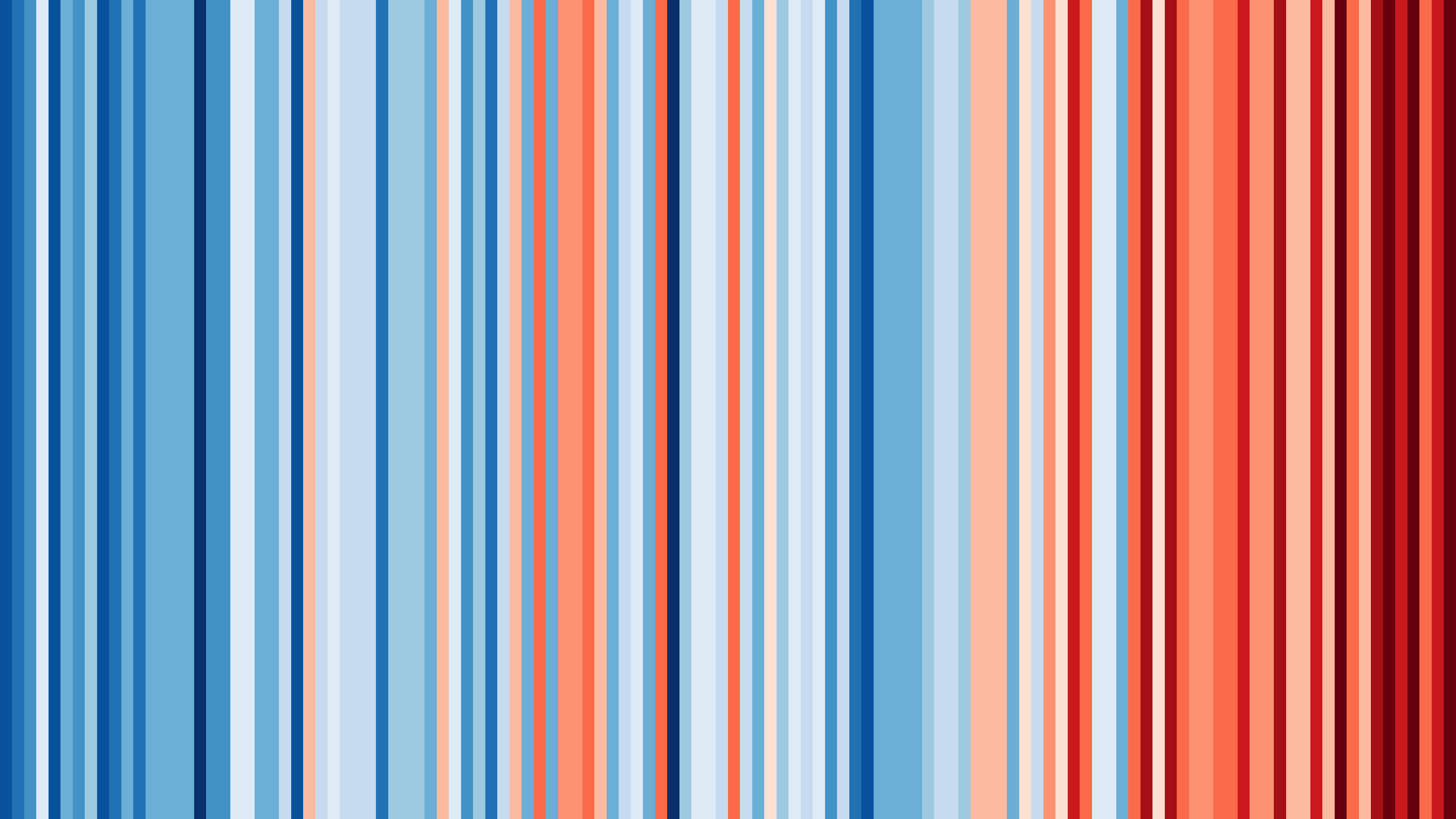
Warming stripes: Spain 1901-2020

Köppen climate classification map for Spain for 1980–2016

2071–2100 map under the most intense climate change scenario. Mid-range scenarios are currently considered more likely

Between 1965 and 2015 the average temperature rose by 1.5 °C (2.7 °F). According to Aemet the frequency of heatwaves have doubled since 2010. Between 1980 and 2000 were 10 to 12 heatwaves per decade, whereas between 2010 and 2020 there were 24. The duration of these heatwaves will also be longer, with at least 41 days of extreme heat predicted in 2050 and, in the worst emissions scenario, 50 days. Compare this to heatwaves in 1971-2000 when the average number of days was 21 days annually.

Based on the IPCC reports, different scenarios have been developed in order to study the future climate. The AEMET (Spanish meteorology agency) has studied how three of these would affect the Spanish climate through the year 2100: RCP 4.5, RCP 6, and RCP 8.5. The first scenario (RCP 4.5) envisages an increase in greenhouse gas emissions for several more decades, before stabilising and then decreasing before the end of the century. The RCP 8.5 scenario models the most extreme case, with no regulation of greenhouse gas emissions.

In the best-case scenario (RCP 4.5), between 2081 and 2100 the annual maximum temperature would increase 2–4 °C (3.6–7.2 °F), with an uncertainty of 0.5–1.5 °C (0.90–2.70 °F). In RCP 6.0 that becomes an increase of 1-4 °C ± 0.5-1.5 °C (1.8–7.2 °F ± 0.90–2.70 °F) between 2046 and 2065, and of 3–5 °C (5.4–9.0 °F) between 2081 and 2100.

In the worst-case scenario (RCP 8.5), the annual maximum temperature increases of 4–7 °C (7.2–12.6 °F) are expected for 2081–2100. In this scenario there is an uncertainty of 1.5–3 °C (2.7–5.4 °F).

Changes are also predicted regarding precipitation. In scenario RCP 4.5, predicted changes for the years 2081-2100 range from +10% (in specific localised regions) to -20% with an uncertainty of up to 30%. Whereas in scenario RCP 8.5 the expected annual precipitation change varies from +10% to -30% with uncertainties of 10-30% between 2081 and 2100.

=== Extreme weather events ===
==== Heatwaves ====
Of Spain's many heat waves, some that stand out are:

- 2017 for being the year with most heat waves, having had 5, totaling 25 days - 1991 and 2016 had 4 heat waves each.
- 2003 for having had the hottest summer ever recorded with an average national temperature of 24.94 °C (76.89 °F), and for having had the longest heatwave at the time. This 16 day heatwave caused thousands of deaths in Europe.
- 2015 for having the longest heat wave which lasted for 26 days, ten days more than the previous record holder.
- 2012 for having the most extensive heatwave. On August 10, it affected 40 out of 50 provinces.

Climate change made the April 2023 heatwave at least 100 times more likely. The previous year (2022) heatwaves killed almost 4,000 people in Spain.

Heatwaves from 1901 to 2010

==== Winter of 2022-2023 ====
The winter of 2022-2023 was, in general, hot and humid. December 2022 was the hottest December in the historical record, with the winter being the fifth hottest of the 21st century.

==== Meteorological drought ====
In March 2022 AEMET analysed the previous 12 months and found that peninsular Spain has been in a meteorological drought since January 2022. These events are probably made more likely by climate change.

=== Water resources ===
The annual precipitation was 601.2 mm (23.7 in) between 1991 and 2020, and may decrease by 64.52 mm (2.5 in) in 2040–2059. The effect that climate change has on water resources can be worse in regions that already have low water resources levels and recurring droughts.

According to existing climate change scenarios, Spain's water resources will be severely affected. However, these effects are difficult to accurately measure due to the natural variability of the water cycle and the impact of water usage on flow rates. As a result, enhancing the assessment of climate change impacts by hydrological simulation models is needed.

River basin districts with a higher water exploitation index appear to experience more significant reductions in mean annual runoff. If the predicted climate change scenarios in Spain materialize, the traditional measures used to combat water scarcity must be applied more intensely and in ways consistent with regional effects on water resources. Policymakers in Spain face the challenge of understanding the impact of climate change and devising and executing policies that guarantee the best adaptation to the expected decrease in water resources in the most impacted regions, particularly those already facing water scarcity.

Water resources in Spain are expected to experience temperature increases, more frequent and severe droughts and floods, and decreases in river flows, resulting in reduced water availability. These impacts may aggravate existing conflicts between Spanish regions and further elevate water as a potential powerful political tool.

=== Sea level rise ===
The Ebro Delta is a significant wetland area in the western Mediterranean, about 40% of the delta plain is less than 0.5 metres (20 in) above mean sea level, and parts of the southern margin are at mean sea level but protected by dikes. The delta may see a sea level rise of at least 3 mm (1/8 in) per year. The government is investing millions of euros into shifting sediments to alleviate the impacts of erosion, however this is not seen as a long-term solution.

To offset negative impacts from waterlogging and saltwater intrusion, and to maintain land elevation, future management plans should consider the relative sea level rise. Plans will also need to regulate freshwater and sediment flows from the river. Doing this will entail the partial removal of sediments trapped behind the Ribarroja Dam and Mequinença Dam, as the stocks and inputs of sediments in the corresponding reservoirs are sufficient to elevate the delta plain by around 50 cm (20 in).

Coastal measurements indicate that the global mean sea level has risen at a rate of 1.8 mm (1/16 in) per year from 1950 to 2000, with regional variability. Gauge records in the Bay of Biscay indicate that sea-level rise is accelerating, which is in line with rates observed from satellite imagery in the open ocean since 1993.

Coastal habitats have been mapped via historical airborne photography since 1954 and via high-resolution imagery since 2004. The analysis of tide gauge records from Santander in northern Spain shows that relative mean sea level has been rising at a rate of 2.08 ± 0.33 mm (0.082 ± 0.013 in) per year from 1943 to 2004, consistent with trends from measurements elsewhere in the region. Using a LIDAR-based DTM, the study predicts an 11.1 ha (27 acres) sea-level rise in the Gipuzkoan coast within a 50-year period. However, only 2.95 hectares (7.3 acres) change was detected from historical and recent orthophotography, possibly due to sea-level rise. While 98 hectares (240 acres; 0.98 km^{2}; 0.38 sq mi) were transformed by human impacts, suggesting that human impact poses a greater threat to Basque coastal and estuarine habitats than natural erosive processes and global climate change.

=== Biodiversity ===
A study conducted in northeast Spain concluded that the disappearances of white-clawed crayfish, Mediterranean barbel, chub, European eel, and southern water vole were clearly related to the hydrological changes of the studied stream. The study suggested that no other factors could explain their disappearance: there is no industrial or agrarian sewage in the Olzinelles valley that could cause water quality to deteriorate; the industrial pollution in the river Tordera has been reduced by the construction of sewage treatment plants and other administrative measures; these species had no market value in the study area, and fishing and capturing were occasional, making it unlikely that negative effects on their populations resulted from these activities. Additionally, the human pressure on these species has decreased over the years, as the valley's population dropped by 76% from 1924 to 2007.

The disappearance of white-clawed crayfish in the Olzinelles stream may have been due to the loss of water flow or from the impact of red swamp crayfish. The red swamp crayfish became one of the most widespread invasive species in Spain after its introduction to streams in the Montnegre Mountains in 1989. Though as of 2011 surveys conducted in the Olzinelles stream had not found the crayfish, which was believed related to the absence of water.

== Impacts on people ==
=== Economic impact ===
==== Tourism ====
Although the scientific community has made significant progress in predicting the magnitude and regional variation of climate change in upcoming decades, it is remains challenging to estimate the economic costs of climate change. The challenge mainly lies in the uncertainties of future climate change and economic projections, as well as the intricacies of connecting physical impacts and economic processes.

As many of the tourist activities in Spain are weather-dependent, the industry may be strongly impacted by climate change. It has been projected that the Tourist Climate Index (TCI), which was 'excellent' and 'very good' during the summers (June–August) of 1961 through 1990, will become 'acceptable' around Spain, and 'good' and 'very good' in the north of the country for the years 2051–2080.

=== Agriculture impact ===
Climate change impacts are being observed globally, with certain regions that are already water scarce having higher levels of vulnerability. Spain is predicted to be highly vulnerable because of uneven availability of water resources, and due to existing demands. As a result of its geographic and socio-economic characteristics, Spain is regarded as one of the most vulnerable countries to climate change in the European Union. Models forecast further increases in temperature and reductions in precipitation, which will likely have a profound impact on the region.

Desertification, one of the most significant impacts of climate change in Spain, poses a significant threat to a substantial portion of the country. Over 30% of the area is already severely impacted by desertification, with human activity in arid regions exacerbating the situation. Causes of desertification include forest fires, loss of vegetation cover, erosion, and salinization processes. Climate change projections predict an exacerbation of these issues, particularly in regions with a dry and semi-arid Mediterranean climate.

The agricultural sector is responsible for about 10% of greenhouse gas emissions in Spain. Livestock, particularly pig manure management, accounts for over half the emissions, while crop systems account for the remainder. While agriculture has shown the ability to adapt to long term changes, the magnitude of the changes due to climate change is likely to exceed the adaptive capacity of many European farmers. Therefore, sustainable agriculture requires the synergy of adaptation and mitigation, with no clear separation between them. The Spanish agriculture sector has already implemented several measures aimed at reducing emissions, improving knowledge about them, and introducing energy efficiency criteria in modernizing irrigation systems.

Climate change will have significant impacts on agriculture, ecosystems, and biodiversity, resulting in alterations to Spain's characteristics, accentuating the existing desertification issues, reducing water availability, increasing costs of adaptation measures, and potentially causing future problems such as pests, invasive species, and reduced crop yields. While agriculture is responsible for significant emissions, the efforts being made to address this also recognize its role as a carbon sink.

=== Health impacts ===
Between 1998 and 2012 over three thousand people died annually due to heatwaves. In the (now unlikely) worst-case scenario that number could become 14,500 in 2035-2064 and over 30,000 between 2070 and 2099.

Rising temperatures, ozone levels, and particulate matter concentrations, particularly in urban areas, have been found to increase heat stress, leading to higher risk of death from various health conditions including ischaemic heart disease, stroke, metabolic disorders, and kidney disease. The health impacts of climate change may disproportionately affect groups such as people with chronic illnesses, the elderly, children, and people who are pregnant.

== Mitigation and adaptation ==
=== Renewable energy ===
The Institute for the Diversification and Saving of Energy (IDAE) is a public agency tasked with promoting renewable energy in Spain. It implemented the National Renewable Energy Action Plan 2011–2020, which achieved Spain’s 2020 renewable energy targets in compliance with the EU directive mandating that 20% of energy consumption come from renewable sources. The agency is now responsible for contributing to the EU’s updated goal of 27% renewable energy by 2030, in alignment with commitments made during the Paris Agreement to limit global temperature rise to 1.5 °C (2.7 °F). Policy support from Spain and the EU has contributed to significant cost reductions in solar and wind technologies, making them cost-competitive with, and in some cases cheaper than, fossil fuels.

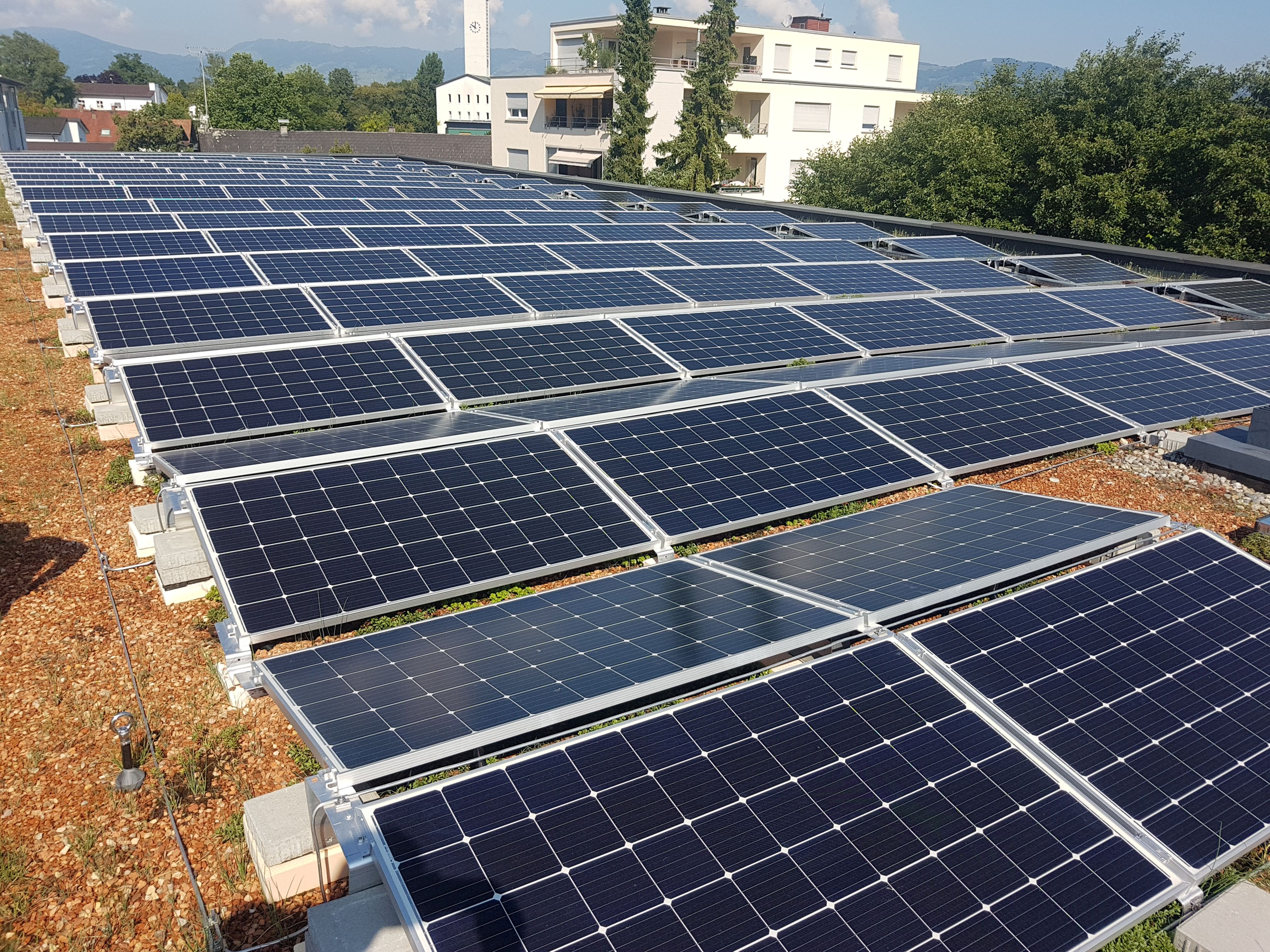
Photovoltaic system on the roof of the KOM event centre in Altach

Renewables account for nearly 40% of Spain’s electricity generation mix. The country benefits from approximately 3,000 hours of sunlight per year, making it one of the sunniest in Europe and ideal for solar power development. In 2022, solar energy saw record growth of 33%, becoming the fourth-largest electricity source with 28,000 GWh of generation and 3.4 GW in new capacity added.

Self-consumption solar energy is another rapidly growing sector. In 2022, installed capacity more than doubled to 2,507 MW compared to 1,203 MW in 2021—an increase of 108%. Spain’s total self-consumption capacity has now surpassed 5,249 MW, driven by regulatory easing and local incentives.

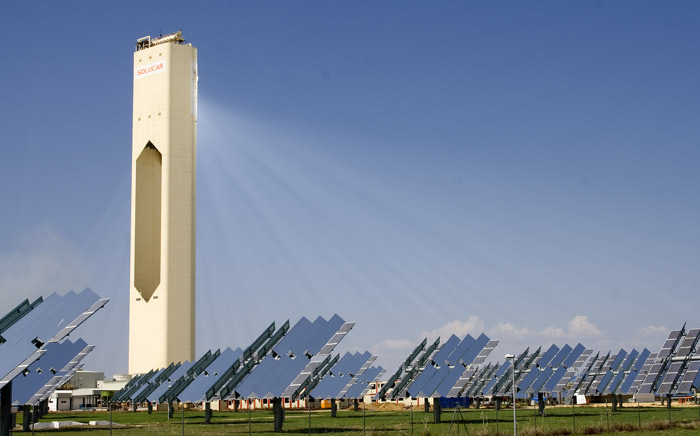
PS10 solar power tower

Spain ranks second in Europe for wind power generation and fourth in installed capacity, with 30.8 GW. Several leading global renewable energy companies are Spanish, including the world’s largest producer of solar thermal energy. Spain hosts the largest installed solar thermal capacity worldwide, operating across all four major technologies: tower, parabolic trough, fresnel, and dish systems.

The Control Centre of Renewable Energies (CECRE) serves as a global reference in renewable energy grid integration. It is the first national control centre dedicated exclusively to monitoring and optimizing renewable energy inputs, managing intermittency, and ensuring grid stability. One major challenge it faces is Spain’s limited interconnection with France, which restricts electricity exchange with the broader European grid.

Spain also hosts pioneering projects such as that on El Hierro, a self-sufficient island powered entirely by a hybrid system of wind and hydroelectric energy. Surplus wind energy is stored via pumped hydro, allowing El Hierro to operate on 100% renewable energy.

Battery Energy Storage Systems (BESS) have emerged as a central component of Spain’s energy transition, improving flexibility and enhancing grid resilience. This became especially evident following the blackout of 28 April 2025, when the Iberian Peninsula was disconnected from the European grid in just five seconds, causing estimated losses of up to €4.5 billion. In response, energy providers such as Iberdrola and Solaria are accelerating the deployment of hybrid solar-plus-battery installations to mitigate the effects of solar overproduction and declining market prices. Solaria alone is developing eight new BESS projects in Castilla y León and Castilla-La Mancha.

=== Transportation ===
The transportation sector has the highest energy consumption in Spain, accounting for 40.4% of the total demand. Of that demand road transport accounts for 81.3%, the vast majority of which uses imported oil. This energy dependence cost approximately €40 billion in 2014, equivalent to 3.8% of Spain's GDP, with consequent problems for the economy, environment, and energy security.

In order to solve this problem, policies have been established at the national level, with a special focus on trucks, private cars, and buses, which account for the largest share of road transport consumption. Spain approved the Strategy for Boosting Alternative Energy in 2015 and the National Action Framework for the development of the market and the infrastructures for alternative fuels in the transport sector in 2016. These measures are structured according to 3 priorities: infrastructure, market and industrialisation.

Spain has several factories that produce alternative fuels for vehicles, as well as companies that produce the infrastructure equipment for recharging. Electric vehicles on Spanish roads account for less than 1% of all vehicles, although the number of electric vehicles has been increasing. For the promotion of these electric vehicles, and more sustainable transport in general, the Spanish government has launched the MOVES III Plan. The plan, provides direct aid to electric vehicles and charging infrastructure, has a €400 million budget, with the option to increase it to €800 million depending on demand.

The beneficiaries of the MOVES III Plan can be individuals or companies, as long as they purchase an electric vehicle, a plug-in hybrid, or an electric vehicle with a long range. The price of the vehicle must be less than €45,000, and the maximum aid is €7,000.

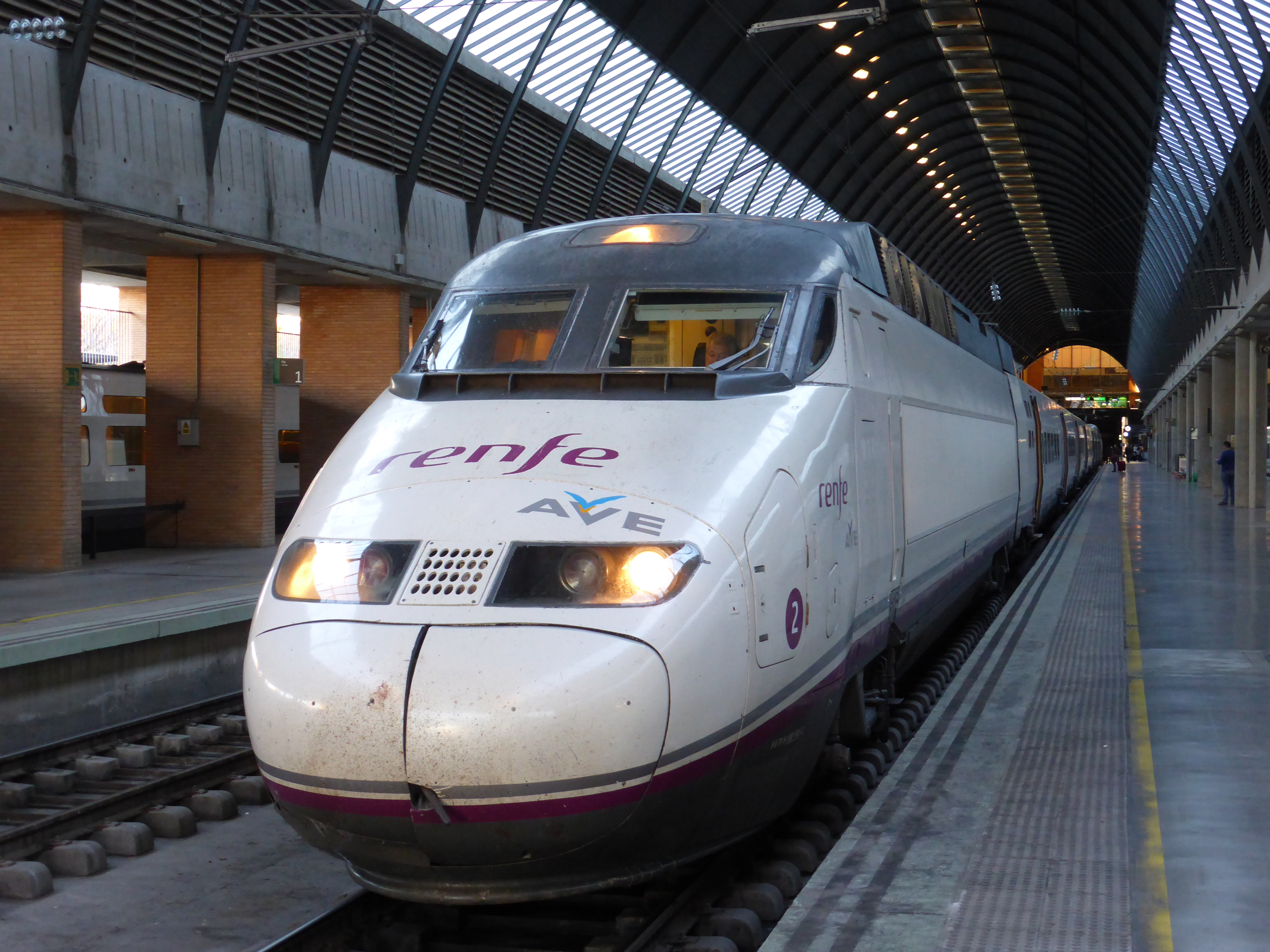
Renfe Series 100 train at Seville-Santa Justa railway station

Spain is the European leader in sustainable rail transportation, as its 3,100 km (1,900 mi) of high speed train tracks are the most extensive high speed network in Europe. Reaching speeds of 310 km/h (190 mph), it possible to connect the North and South of the country in 5 hours. Also 90% of the vehicles using compressed natural gas are public buses, and use in taxis is increasing in some metropolitan areas.

=== Policies and legislation ===
On September 11, 2019, Spain declared a climate emergency.

In 2021, the Spanish parliament approved a law on climate change and energy transition that calls for a 23% reduction of emissions by 2030 (compared to 1990 levels) and carbon neutrality by 2050. By or before 2030 all coal-fired power plants will have been shut down and coal-phase out is supported by EU funds for a just transition. By 2040 Spain plans to limit car sales to electric vehicles.

On 20 May 2021, The Climate Change and Energy Transition Law went into force; the law requires reaching climate neutrality by 2050 at the latest. Article 3 establishes the long-term objective of decarbonising the economy by 2050 with a 100% renewable electricity system. In addition, the law establishes a series of shorter term objectives, including: reducing greenhouse gas emissions at least 23% by 2030, compared to 1990 levels; achieving 42% renewable energy in energy consumption and 74% renewable energy in electricity generation; as well as reducing energy consumption by 39.5% by improving energy efficiency.

The law also prohibits authorisations for hydrocarbon exploration and exploitation, instead establishing direct subsidies for biogas, biomethane, hydrogen and other renewable fuels. By 2040 new commercial vehicles must all be zero emission and by 2023 all municipalities with more than 50,000 inhabitants, and all islands, must implement their own climate change mitigation measures.

Law 7/2021 on climate change and energy transition establishes 7 main objectives:

- Carbon neutrality by 2050
- Reduce emissions by at least 55% by 2030, compared to 1990
- Reduce greenhouse gas emissions at least 23% compared to 1990 levels
- Reduce greenhouse gas emissions at least 55% by 2030, compared to 1990 levels
- Improve energy efficiency at least 39.5%
- Renewable energies should account for at least 74% of electricity generation by 2030
- Renewable energies should account for at least 42% of energy consumption by 2030

=== Paris Agreement ===
Spain signed the Paris Agreement on 22 April 2016 and ratified it on 12 June 2017. Prior to this agreement, Spain had signed the Kyoto Protocol on 29 April 1998, which was ratified on 31 May 2002. The last annual conference on climate change took place in Madrid in December 2019.

On 23 March 2023, Teresa Ribera, Vice President of the Spanish Government, and Fatih Birol, International Executive Director of the International Energy Agency, announced Madrid will host an international climate and energy summit on 2 October 2023. The goal of the summit is to build a coalition to maintain the commitment reached in the Paris agreement—limiting the global temperature increase to below 1.5 °C (2.7 °F).

According to the IEA, global CO_{2} emissions need to peak before 2025, and drop to net zero by 2050, to prevent global temperatures from rising by more than 1.5 °C (2.7 °F). The summit is confirmation of the Paris agreement and will be useful to provide global decision-makers with the opportunity to send a signal of strength for our common future.

In the words of Fatih Birol, the meeting in Madrid will be "the moment to come together in a grand coalition of all stakeholders – encompassing governments, the energy industry, investors and civil society – that are genuinely committed to reducing emissions while safeguarding energy security. We need to send a strong message ahead of COP28 that the 1.5 °C goal is still alive."

== Society and culture ==
=== Public awareness ===
As the effects of climate change are being felt more in Spain than in central and northern European countries, Spanish society is more concerned about climate change than countries traditionally considered environmentalist such as Germany or Sweden.

In Spain 82% of people think that climate change is the biggest challenge for humanity in the 21st century. Furthermore, 81% of Spanish people believe that climate change has an impact on their lives, versus 77% of Europeans in general. A majority of Spanish people also believe that their country should rely more on renewable energies.

Spanish people also think that the governmental measures are too flexible and that they allow individuals and companies to avoid changing their behaviour. Therefore 58% of Spanish people think that Spain will not succeed in reducing greenhouse gas emissions as set out in the Paris agreement.

Among the most popular Spanish solutions against climate change are: educating and improving children's concern for sustainable consumption; the creation of a specific tax for those products and services that contribute the most to climate change; and eliminating short-haul flights, instead promoting high-speed trains.

=== Activism ===
Climate movements in Spain are growing especially among the youth. A slogan used by a wide range of civil society groups including climate activists, workers' unions and fair housing movements is that "without sustainability there is no social justice."

Spanish environmental activists have spoken out against plans to expand airports in Madrid and Barcelona; the organisers of these protests have united around a platform called Zeroport.

The Fridays for Future movement has also become very popular in Spain. The first demonstration took place at the University of Girona and quickly spread to the rest of the country.

In 2019, half a million people took to the streets because of climate change.

== See also ==
- Plug-in electric vehicles in Spain
