= Climate of Barcelona =

Barcelona (Can Bruixa, Barcelona city)

Climate chart (precipitation, max. and min. temperature)
J	F	M	A	M	J	J	A	S	O	N	D
44 15 9	31 16 9	33 17 11	48 19 13	47 23 16	33 26 20	25 29 23	41 29 23	82 26 20	97 23 17	45 18 12	47 15 10
- █ Average max. and min. temperatures in °C
- █ Precipitation totals in mm
- Source: Servei Meteorològic de Catalunya
Imperial conversion
J	F	M	A	M	J	J	A	S	O	N	D
1.7 59 48	1.2 60 49	1.3 63 52	1.9 66 55	1.9 73 61	1.3 79 68	1 83 73	1.6 84 74	3.2 79 68	3.8 73 62	1.8 64 53	1.8 59 49
- █ Average max. and min. temperatures in °F
- █ Precipitation totals in inches

El Prat de Llobregat, Josep Tarradellas Barcelona–El Prat Airport (15 kilometres (9.3 mi)) from the city centre

Climate chart (precipitation, max. and min. temperature)
J	F	M	A	M	J	J	A	S	O	N	D
41 14 6	30 15 6	42 16 8	47 19 10	42 22 14	26 26 18	27 28 21	51 29 21	86 26 18	82 22 14	46 18 9	37 15 6
- █ Average max. and min. temperatures in °C
- █ Precipitation totals in mm
- Source: AEMET
Imperial conversion
J	F	M	A	M	J	J	A	S	O	N	D
1.6 57 42	1.2 58 43	1.7 62 47	1.9 65 51	1.7 71 57	1 78 64	1.1 83 69	2 84 70	3.4 79 64	3.2 72 58	1.8 64 48	1.5 58 43
- █ Average max. and min. temperatures in °F
- █ Precipitation totals in inches

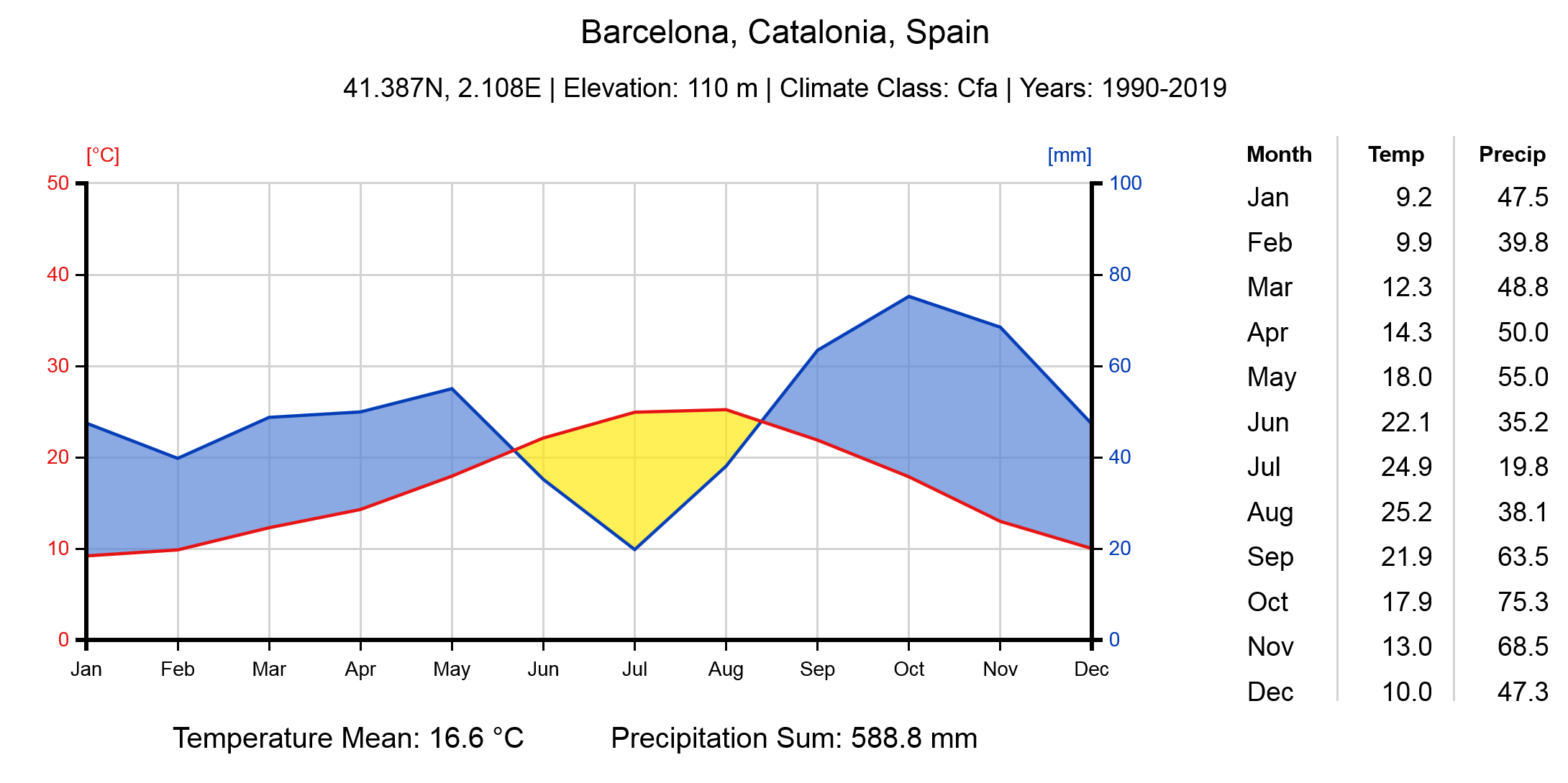
Barcelona climate chart

Barcelona has a Mediterranean climate (Csa) according to Köppen-Geiger classification, a warm-temperate subtropical climate (Warmgemäßigt-subtropisches Zonenklima) according to Troll-Paffen climate classification, and a subtropical climate according to Siegmund/Frankenberg climate classification.

== Temperature ==
=== General ===
Yearly max temp	Yearly mean temp	Yearly min temp
21 °C (70 °F)	18 °C (64 °F)	15 °C (59 °F)

Barcelona's average annual temperature is 21.2 °C (70.2 °F) during the day and 15.1 °C (59.2 °F) at night. In the coldest month, January, the temperature typically ranges from 12 to 18 °C (54 to 64 °F) during the day and 6 to 12 °C (43 to 54 °F) at night. In the warmest month, August, the temperature typically ranges from 27 to 31 °C (81 to 88 °F) during the day and from 20 to 24 °C (68 to 75 °F) at night. Large fluctuations in temperature are very rare.

=== Seasonal climate ===
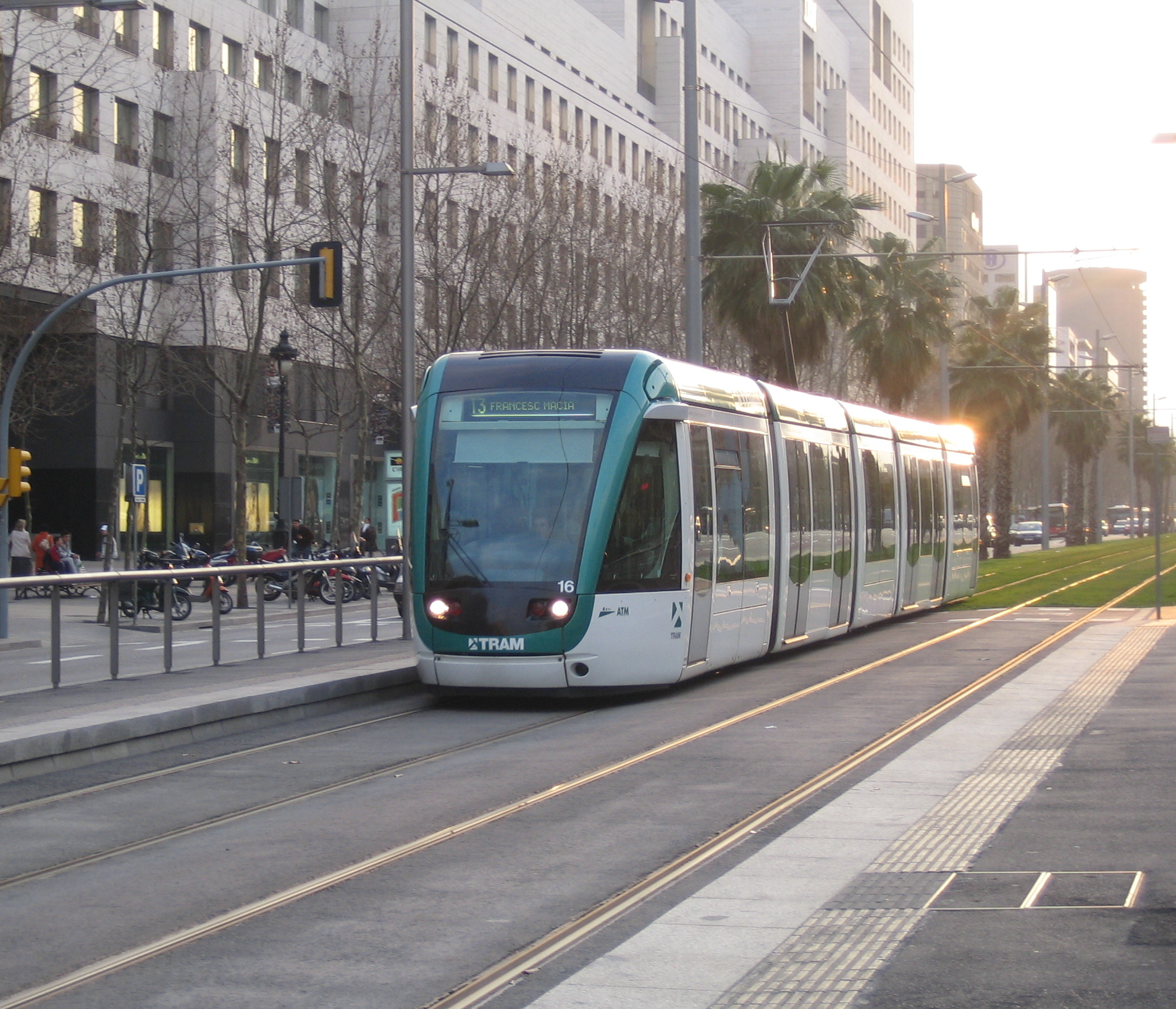
Winter in Barcelona: mild and relatively dry

==== Winter ====
Winters in Barcelona are mild. January and February are the coldest months, with average temperatures around 15 °C (59 °F) during the day and 9 °C (48 °F) at night. The hills around the city (such as Montjuic) and in the outer metropolitan area, further from the sea, occasionally record frost at night. Frost during the day has been recorded in the city and inner metropolitan area during the strongest cold waves and snowstorms, but is very rare overall. The last time the city recorded a temperature below freezing was on 27 January 2005.

==== Spring ====
Spring lasts usually from March to late May, although in some years it might get into June. Maximum is around 19–20 °C (66–68 °F) and the minimum is around 13–14 °C (55–57 °F). Rain is more frequent in spring than in winter and summer, but less than autumn.

==== Summer ====
Generally the summer season lasts from late May or early June to late September or early October. July and August are the warmest months, with average temperatures around 28–29 °C (82–84 °F) during the day and 22–23 °C (72–73 °F) at night. In June and September the average temperature is around 26 °C (79 °F) during the day and 20 °C (68 °F) at night. Daytime temperatures above 34 °C (93 °F) are rare.

==== Autumn ====
Autumn is the rainiest season of the year, lasting from October to December. Maximum is around 18–19 °C (64–66 °F) and the minimum is around 12–13 °C (54–55 °F).

== Sunshine ==
Sunshine duration is 2,524 hours per year, from 138 - average 4.5 hours of sunshine per day in December to 310 - average 10 hours of sunshine per day in July. Barcelona has an average seasonal UV index close to that of Madrid, different only in March but with the same annual average of 5, with the values varying from 9 in June and July to 1 in December. Although at about the same latitude New Haven, Connecticut has values a little lower than Barcelona but still close.

Climate data for Barcelona
Month	Jan	Feb	Mar	Apr	May	Jun	Jul	Aug	Sep	Oct	Nov	Dec	Year
Mean monthly sunshine hours	149	163	200	220	244	262	310	282	219	180	146	138	2,524
Mean daily sunshine hours	4.80	5.71	6.45	7.33	7.87	8.73	10.0	9.09	7.30	5.80	4.86	4.45	6.9
Percentage possible sunshine	50	56	48	54	57	62	69	67	55	52	52	47	55
Average ultraviolet index	2	3	4	6	7	9	9	8	6	4	2	1	5
Source: Agencia Estatal de Meteorología (mean daily and monthly sunshine hours), climatemps.com (percent possible sunshine) and Weather Atlas (UV index)

== Daylight ==
In winter, days are not as short as in the northern part of the continent, as the average hours of daylight in December, January and February is 10 (for comparison: London or Moscow or Warsaw - about 8 hours).

Average hours of daylight
Month	Jan	Feb	Mar	Apr	May	Jun	Jul	Aug	Sep	Oct	Nov	Dec
hours of light	10	11	12	13	15	15	15	14	12	11	10	9
hours of Twilight/Night	14	13	12	11	9	9	9	10	12	13	14	15

== Precipitation ==
Barcelona has on average only 55 precipitation (≥ 1 mm) days a year, therein average several rainy days per month, ranging from 2 in July to 6 in October. The average annual precipitation is less than 640 mm (25 inches), ranging from 20 mm (0.79 inch) in July to 91 mm (3.58 inch) in October.

As the city lies on a leeward location relative to the westerlies, the largest amounts of rainfall in the cold season are produced by easternly (backdoor) cold fronts or "Levanters", which can last several days and be enhanced when an Atlantic cutoff travels through the Straits of Gibraltar and the Alboran Sea. So although Atlantic cyclones usually produce little or no precipitation at all, the slipstream effect (rebuf in Catalan) behind a cold front or a trough, when N-NW winds from the Ebro valley ("mestral") and the easternmost Pyrenees ("tramuntana") converge around Barcelona, brings rain or, in case of enough low temperatures, snow, as in November 1999. Especially in summer, when sea surface temperature (SST) is higher, convective precipitation can happen in the form of warm rain (i.e. from the coalescence of water droplets without ice formation) instead of a conventional thunderstorm. Either way, these storms can be heavy and lead to flash floods in the lowest parts of the city.

Climate data for Barcelona (precipitation days - 1 mm)
Month	Jan	Feb	Mar	Apr	May	Jun	Jul	Aug	Sep	Oct	Nov	Dec	Year
Average precipitation mm (inches)	41 (1.6)	29 (1.1)	42 (1.7)	49 (1.9)	59 (2.3)	42 (1.7)	20 (0.8)	61 (2.4)	85 (3.3)	91 (3.6)	58 (2.3)	51 (2.0)	640 (25.2)
Average precipitation days (≥ 1 mm)	5	4	5	5	5	4	2	4	5	6	5	5	55
Source: Agencia Estatal de Meteorología

Climate data for Barcelona (precipitation days - 0.1 mm)
Month	Jan	Feb	Mar	Apr	May	Jun	Jul	Aug	Sep	Oct	Nov	Dec	Year
Average precipitation days (≥ 0.1 mm)	6	5	6	7	7	6	3	6	6	8	6	6	72
Source: World Meteorological Organization

== Humidity ==
Average relative humidity is 72%, ranging from 69% in July to 75% in October.

Climate data for Barcelona
Month	Jan	Feb	Mar	Apr	May	Jun	Jul	Aug	Sep	Oct	Nov	Dec	Year
Average relative humidity (%)	73	71	71	71	73	72	69	72	73	75	74	73	72
Source: Agencia Estatal de Meteorología

== Snow ==
Snowfalls in the city are rare, but light snowfall events can happen any year on the top of the mountains around the city and in the depths of the metropolitan area (far from the sea) more frequently. A heavy snowfall occurred in Christmas 1962, being the heaviest snowfall recorded in Barcelona since 1887. In the 21st century, the heaviest snowfall happened on 8 March 2010, a thundersnow during which public transport and roads were shut down.

Climate data for Barcelona Airport (El Prat de Llobregat) about 20 kilometres (12 mi) from the city center
Month	Jan	Feb	Mar	Apr	May	Jun	Jul	Aug	Sep	Oct	Nov	Dec	Year
Average snowy days	0.1	0.2	0.1	0	0	0	0	0	0	0	0.1	0	0.4
Source: Agencia Estatal de Meteorología

Climate data for Fabra Observatory, altitude: 408 metres (1,339 ft) m.a.s.l.
Month	Jan	Feb	Mar	Apr	May	Jun	Jul	Aug	Sep	Oct	Nov	Dec	Year
Average snowy days	0.5	0.7	0.3	0	0	0	0	0	0	0	0.1	0.2	2.0
Source: Agencia Estatal de Meteorología

== Mean maximums and minimums ==
Climate data for Barcelona Can Bruixa, 1987–2010
Month	Jan	Feb	Mar	Apr	May	Jun	Jul	Aug	Sep	Oct	Nov	Dec	Year
Mean maximum °C (°F)	19.9 (67.8)	20.4 (68.7)	23.7 (74.7)	24.4 (75.9)	27.7 (81.9)	31.4 (88.5)	32.7 (90.9)	33.8 (92.8)	30.0 (86.0)	26.9 (80.4)	23.0 (73.4)	20.4 (68.7)	33.8 (92.8)
Mean minimum °C (°F)	4.1 (39.4)	4.7 (40.5)	6.2 (43.2)	8.2 (46.8)	11.6 (52.9)	15.3 (59.5)	17.9 (64.2)	18.6 (65.5)	15.4 (59.7)	12.1 (53.8)	6.9 (44.4)	4.8 (40.6)	4.1 (39.4)
Source: Agencia Estatal de Meteorología - Servei Meteorològic de Catalunya

== Temperature extremes ==
The highest temperature recorded during the day was 37.4 °C (99.3 °F) on 27 August 2010; the average August 2003 maximum temperature during the day was 32.8 °C (91.0 °F). The coldest temperature recorded was −8.0 °C (17.6 °F) at night on 27 December 1962.

Climate data for Barcelona centre extremes (1994-present)
Month	Jan	Feb	Mar	Apr	May	Jun	Jul	Aug	Sep	Oct	Nov	Dec	Year
Record high °C (°F)	22.5 (72.5)	23.2 (73.8)	25.8 (78.4)	26.7 (80.1)	30.3 (86.5)	35.2 (95.4)	35.9 (96.6)	36.2 (97.2)	30.7 (87.3)	29.0 (84.2)	25.9 (78.6)	21.7 (71.1)	36.2 (97.2)
Record low °C (°F)	−1.3 (29.7)	−0.2 (31.6)	0.9 (33.6)	4.3 (39.7)	8.1 (46.6)	12.6 (54.7)	15.3 (59.5)	16.0 (60.8)	12.7 (54.9)	6.9 (44.4)	1.4 (34.5)	1.1 (34.0)	−1.3 (29.7)
Source: Agencia Estatal de Meteorología

Climate data for Barcelona Can Bruixa - Barcelona city (1987-2010)
Month	Jan	Feb	Mar	Apr	May	Jun	Jul	Aug	Sep	Oct	Nov	Dec	Year
Record high °C (°F)	22.4 (72.3)	24.8 (76.6)	28.8 (83.8)	27.7 (81.9)	31.6 (88.9)	35.8 (96.4)	36.8 (98.2)	38.2 (100.8)	33.4 (92.1)	32.6 (90.7)	26.1 (79.0)	23.1 (73.6)	38.2 (100.8)
Record low °C (°F)	−1.0 (30.2)	0.6 (33.1)	0.4 (32.7)	6.2 (43.2)	6.3 (43.3)	12.4 (54.3)	15.5 (59.9)	15.2 (59.4)	12.5 (54.5)	5.4 (41.7)	1.7 (35.1)	0.7 (33.3)	−1.0 (30.2)
Source: Agencia Estatal de Meteorología - Servei Meteorològic de Catalunya

Climate data for Barcelona Airport, El Prat de Llobregat city (1924-present)
Month	Jan	Feb	Mar	Apr	May	Jun	Jul	Aug	Sep	Oct	Nov	Dec	Year
Record high °C (°F)	22.4 (72.3)	24.5 (76.1)	27.5 (81.5)	26.5 (79.7)	32.0 (89.6)	34.9 (94.8)	36.0 (96.8)	37.4 (99.3)	34.0 (93.2)	30.4 (86.7)	27.0 (80.6)	27.0 (80.6)	37.4 (99.3)
Record low °C (°F)	−7.2 (19.0)	−6.6 (20.1)	−1.4 (29.5)	0.1 (32.2)	3.0 (37.4)	7.8 (46.0)	11.4 (52.5)	9.5 (49.1)	7.6 (45.7)	3.8 (38.8)	−1.4 (29.5)	−8 (18)	−8 (18)
Source: Agencia Estatal de Meteorología

Climate data for Barcelona, 1931-1960
Month	Jan	Feb	Mar	Apr	May	Jun	Jul	Aug	Sep	Oct	Nov	Dec	Year
Record high °C (°F)	22.8 (73.0)	23.0 (73.4)	24.9 (76.8)	27.8 (82.0)	32.2 (90.0)	35.0 (95.0)	35.4 (95.7)	36.1 (97.0)	32.6 (90.7)	27.9 (82.2)	24.5 (76.1)	20.9 (69.6)	36.1 (97.0)
Record low °C (°F)	−2.4 (27.7)	−6.7 (19.9)	0.8 (33.4)	3.9 (39.0)	4.8 (40.6)	11.0 (51.8)	13.8 (56.8)	13.2 (55.8)	10.4 (50.7)	5.0 (41.0)	2.8 (37.0)	−2.5 (27.5)	−6.7 (19.9)
Source: Agencia Estatal de Meteorología

== Fog ==
Although Barcelona is generally a sunny city, some days of fog and spells of overcast days are not rare. Sea fog is frequent in early spring, when the first warm African air masses come in over the cold sea water.

== Thunderstorms ==
Thunderstorms, which occasionally reach severe limits, are common from mid July until November. The most recent major summer storm was on the 31 July 2002, when over 200 mm (7.87 in) of rain were recorded at some observatories.

== Winds ==
Although Barcelona is normally not a windy city, it is affected by sea breezes from May/June to September and winds from the west and northwest in winter. Eastern gales sometimes cause floods on the coastline. East and northeast winds can exceed 100 km/h (62.14 mph). In winter Barcelona is sometimes affected by the tramontana or mistral winds, like other places in the Northwestern Mediterranean Basin.

Wind direction in Barcelona

Wind direction in Barcelona from 2002 to 2012 (average values)
North	Northeast	East	South East	Southern	Southwest	West	Northwest
7.2%	3.7%	15.2%	11.3%	21.1%	33.7%	4.4%	3.4%
Source: world-weather.ru

== Sea temperature ==
Average annual temperature of sea is about 18 °C (64 °F). In the coldest month – January, the average sea temperature is 13 °C (55 °F). In the warmest month – August, the average sea temperature is 24 to 25 °C (75 to 77 °F).

Average sea temperature, according to weather2travel.com:
Jan	Feb	Mar	Apr	May	Jun	Jul	Aug	Sep	Oct	Nov	Dec	Year
13 °C (55 °F)	13 °C (55 °F)	13 °C (55 °F)	14 °C (57 °F)	17 °C (63 °F)	20 °C (68 °F)	23 °C (73 °F)	25 °C (77 °F)	23 °C (73 °F)	20 °C (68 °F)	17 °C (63 °F)	15 °C (59 °F)	18 °C (64 °F)

Average sea temperature, according to seatemperature.org:
Jan	Feb	Mar	Apr	May	Jun	Jul	Aug	Sep	Oct	Nov	Dec	Year
13.3 °C (55.9 °F)	13.1 °C (55.6 °F)	13.3 °C (55.9 °F)	14.7 °C (58.5 °F)	17.5 °C (63.5 °F)	20.9 °C (69.6 °F)	22.9 °C (73.2 °F)	24.1 °C (75.4 °F)	23.1 °C (73.6 °F)	20.9 °C (69.6 °F)	17.7 °C (63.9 °F)	15.1 °C (59.2 °F)	18.1 °C (64.6 °F)

== Seasonal information ==
Snow is rare in Barcelona (falling only once every two years on average), although there are resorts for winter sports in the Pyrenees 100–150 km from the city such as La Molina. Summers in Barcelona area are warm. Summer temperatures - above 20 °C (68 °F) - begin as early as May, although in this month the sea temperature is still mild: around 17–18 °C (63–64 °F). The summer season ends in October. Over the summer season (4 months), the average temperatures is 26–29 °C (79–84 °F) during the day and the average sea temperature is 23 °C (73 °F). The weather in Barcelona during spring and autumn can be very changeable. During these months it can rain for quite long periods, but consecutive sunny days are also fairly common. The difference between temperatures during day and night is small because of the strong maritime influence, very rarely surpassing 10 °C.

== Climatic data for Barcelona area ==
Climate data for Barcelona centre (1994-2020), extremes (1994-present)
Month	Jan	Feb	Mar	Apr	May	Jun	Jul	Aug	Sep	Oct	Nov	Dec	Year
Record high °C (°F)	22.5 (72.5)	23.2 (73.8)	25.8 (78.4)	26.7 (80.1)	30.3 (86.5)	35.2 (95.4)	35.9 (96.6)	36.2 (97.2)	30.7 (87.3)	29.0 (84.2)	25.9 (78.6)	21.7 (71.1)	36.2 (97.2)
Mean daily maximum °C (°F)	14.5 (58.1)	14.4 (57.9)	16.0 (60.8)	17.7 (63.9)	20.6 (69.1)	24.3 (75.7)	27.0 (80.6)	27.6 (81.7)	25.1 (77.2)	21.9 (71.4)	17.5 (63.5)	14.9 (58.8)	20.1 (68.2)
Daily mean °C (°F)	11.3 (52.3)	11.3 (52.3)	13.1 (55.6)	15.1 (59.2)	18.0 (64.4)	21.9 (71.4)	24.7 (76.5)	25.2 (77.4)	22.4 (72.3)	19.1 (66.4)	14.4 (57.9)	11.9 (53.4)	17.4 (63.3)
Mean daily minimum °C (°F)	8.1 (46.6)	8.2 (46.8)	10.1 (50.2)	12.4 (54.3)	15.4 (59.7)	19.4 (66.9)	22.4 (72.3)	22.8 (73.0)	19.7 (67.5)	16.2 (61.2)	11.3 (52.3)	8.8 (47.8)	14.6 (58.2)
Record low °C (°F)	−1.3 (29.7)	−0.2 (31.6)	0.9 (33.6)	4.3 (39.7)	8.1 (46.6)	12.6 (54.7)	15.3 (59.5)	16.0 (60.8)	12.7 (54.9)	6.9 (44.4)	1.4 (34.5)	1.1 (34.0)	−1.3 (29.7)
Average precipitation mm (inches)	33.1 (1.30)	29.6 (1.17)	38.0 (1.50)	46.5 (1.83)	31.3 (1.23)	17.9 (0.70)	25.2 (0.99)	27.8 (1.09)	65.0 (2.56)	75.2 (2.96)	37.6 (1.48)	32.8 (1.29)	460 (18.1)
Average precipitation days (≥ 1 mm)	3.7	3.7	4.0	5.3	4.3	2.7	1.9	3.2	5.3	5.6	4.2	3.7	47.6
Source: Agencia Estatal de Meteorología

Climate data for Barcelona - Les Corts (1987-2010)
Month	Jan	Feb	Mar	Apr	May	Jun	Jul	Aug	Sep	Oct	Nov	Dec	Year
Mean daily maximum °C (°F)	14.8 (58.6)	15.6 (60.1)	17.4 (63.3)	19.1 (66.4)	22.5 (72.5)	26.1 (79.0)	28.6 (83.5)	29.1 (84.4)	26.0 (78.8)	22.5 (72.5)	17.9 (64.2)	15.1 (59.2)	21.2 (70.2)
Daily mean °C (°F)	11.7 (53.1)	12.4 (54.3)	14.2 (57.6)	15.8 (60.4)	19.3 (66.7)	23.0 (73.4)	25.7 (78.3)	26.1 (79.0)	23.0 (73.4)	19.5 (67.1)	14.9 (58.8)	12.3 (54.1)	18.2 (64.8)
Mean daily minimum °C (°F)	8.8 (47.8)	9.3 (48.7)	10.9 (51.6)	12.5 (54.5)	16.1 (61.0)	19.8 (67.6)	22.7 (72.9)	23.1 (73.6)	20.0 (68.0)	16.5 (61.7)	11.9 (53.4)	9.5 (49.1)	15.1 (59.2)
Average precipitation mm (inches)	43.7 (1.72)	31.4 (1.24)	33.0 (1.30)	47.7 (1.88)	47.4 (1.87)	25.5 (1.00)	25.1 (0.99)	40.8 (1.61)	81.9 (3.22)	96.5 (3.80)	45.1 (1.78)	46.8 (1.84)	565.0 (22.24)
Average precipitation days (≥ 0.1 mm)	6.0	5.0	6.2	7.9	7.5	5.5	3.1	5.8	8.0	8.0	6.6	7.0	76.6
Source: Servei Meteorològic de Catalunya

Climate data for Barcelona Airport (1981-2010, altitude: 4 m.a.s.l., location)
Month	Jan	Feb	Mar	Apr	May	Jun	Jul	Aug	Sep	Oct	Nov	Dec	Year
Mean daily maximum °C (°F)	13.6 (56.5)	14.3 (57.7)	16.1 (61.0)	18.0 (64.4)	21.1 (70.0)	24.9 (76.8)	28.0 (82.4)	28.5 (83.3)	26.0 (78.8)	22.1 (71.8)	17.3 (63.1)	14.3 (57.7)	20.3 (68.5)
Daily mean °C (°F)	9.2 (48.6)	9.9 (49.8)	11.8 (53.2)	13.7 (56.7)	16.9 (62.4)	20.9 (69.6)	23.9 (75.0)	24.4 (75.9)	21.7 (71.1)	17.8 (64.0)	13.0 (55.4)	10.0 (50.0)	16.1 (61.0)
Mean daily minimum °C (°F)	4.7 (40.5)	5.4 (41.7)	7.4 (45.3)	9.4 (48.9)	12.8 (55.0)	16.8 (62.2)	19.8 (67.6)	20.2 (68.4)	17.4 (63.3)	13.5 (56.3)	8.6 (47.5)	5.7 (42.3)	11.8 (53.2)
Average precipitation mm (inches)	37 (1.5)	35 (1.4)	36 (1.4)	40 (1.6)	47 (1.9)	30 (1.2)	21 (0.8)	62 (2.4)	81 (3.2)	91 (3.6)	59 (2.3)	40 (1.6)	588 (23.1)
Average precipitation days (≥ 1 mm)	4	4	5	5	5	4	2	5	5	6	5	4	53
Average snowy days	0.1	0.2	0.1	0	0	0	0	0	0	0	0.1	0	0.5
Average relative humidity (%)	70	70	70	69	70	68	67	68	70	73	71	69	70
Mean monthly sunshine hours	158	171	206	239	258	287	293	264	229	196	153	137	2,591
Source: Agencia Estatal de Meteorología

Climate data for Barcelona, 1931-1960
Month	Jan	Feb	Mar	Apr	May	Jun	Jul	Aug	Sep	Oct	Nov	Dec	Year
Mean daily maximum °C (°F)	12.7 (54.9)	13.6 (56.5)	15.7 (60.3)	18.2 (64.8)	21.3 (70.3)	25.1 (77.2)	27.8 (82.0)	27.7 (81.9)	25.0 (77.0)	20.7 (69.3)	16.4 (61.5)	13.0 (55.4)	19.8 (67.6)
Daily mean °C (°F)	9.5 (49.1)	10.3 (50.5)	12.3 (54.1)	14.6 (58.3)	17.7 (63.9)	21.5 (70.7)	24.3 (75.7)	24.3 (75.7)	21.9 (71.4)	17.6 (63.7)	13.5 (56.3)	10.3 (50.5)	16.5 (61.7)
Mean daily minimum °C (°F)	6.4 (43.5)	6.9 (44.4)	9.0 (48.2)	10.9 (51.6)	14.0 (57.2)	18.0 (64.4)	20.7 (69.3)	20.9 (69.6)	18.8 (65.8)	14.6 (58.3)	10.6 (51.1)	7.5 (45.5)	13.2 (55.7)
Average precipitation mm (inches)	30 (1.2)	40 (1.6)	53 (2.1)	45 (1.8)	54 (2.1)	40 (1.6)	30 (1.2)	47 (1.9)	82 (3.2)	77 (3.0)	54 (2.1)	49 (1.9)	601 (23.7)
Average precipitation days (≥ 0.1 mm)	5	6	8	8	8	6	4	6	8	8	7	7	81
Mean monthly sunshine hours	146	165	177	213	251	279	313	273	201	177	150	133	2,478
Source: Agencia Estatal de Meteorología

Climate data for Barcelona - El Raval (2007-2016)
Month	Jan	Feb	Mar	Apr	May	Jun	Jul	Aug	Sep	Oct	Nov	Dec	Year
Mean daily maximum °C (°F)	15.0 (59.0)	15.2 (59.4)	17.1 (62.8)	19.5 (67.1)	22.6 (72.7)	26.5 (79.7)	28.8 (83.8)	29.0 (84.2)	26.2 (79.2)	22.8 (73.0)	18.4 (65.1)	15.4 (59.7)	21.4 (70.5)
Daily mean °C (°F)	11.8 (53.2)	11.9 (53.4)	13.7 (56.7)	16.3 (61.3)	19.3 (66.7)	23.2 (73.8)	25.8 (78.4)	26.0 (78.8)	23.3 (73.9)	19.8 (67.6)	15.2 (59.4)	12.3 (54.1)	18.2 (64.8)
Mean daily minimum °C (°F)	8.6 (47.5)	8.5 (47.3)	10.2 (50.4)	13.0 (55.4)	15.7 (60.3)	19.8 (67.6)	22.7 (72.9)	23.0 (73.4)	20.3 (68.5)	16.8 (62.2)	12.0 (53.6)	9.2 (48.6)	15.0 (59.0)
Average precipitation mm (inches)	30.3 (1.19)	35.3 (1.39)	65.0 (2.56)	52.7 (2.07)	55.4 (2.18)	27.2 (1.07)	39.3 (1.55)	25.9 (1.02)	58.3 (2.30)	83.7 (3.30)	60.7 (2.39)	25.4 (1.00)	559.2 (22.02)
Average precipitation days (≥ 1 mm)	5.2	5.4	6.3	8.3	6.4	3.9	2.9	3.8	5.7	6.9	6.1	4.6	65.5
Average relative humidity (%)	61	59	60	64	63	61	63	64	64	67	62	61	62
Source: Servei Meteorològic de Catalunya

Climate data for Barcelona (since 2000)
Month	Jan	Feb	Mar	Apr	May	Jun	Jul	Aug	Sep	Oct	Nov	Dec	Year
Mean daily maximum °C (°F)	13.9 (57.0)	14.2 (57.6)	16.2 (61.2)	18.6 (65.5)	21.6 (70.9)	25.8 (78.4)	28.3 (82.9)	29.1 (84.4)	26.3 (79.3)	22.8 (73.0)	18.0 (64.4)	14.4 (57.9)	20.8 (69.4)
Daily mean °C (°F)	9.0 (48.2)	9.7 (49.5)	11.9 (53.4)	14.6 (58.3)	17.8 (64.0)	22.2 (72.0)	24.9 (76.8)	25.3 (77.5)	22.4 (72.3)	18.6 (65.5)	13.4 (56.1)	9.6 (49.3)	16.6 (61.9)
Mean daily minimum °C (°F)	5.0 (41.0)	5.4 (41.7)	7.7 (45.9)	10.6 (51.1)	14.1 (57.4)	18.5 (65.3)	21.3 (70.3)	21.3 (70.3)	18.2 (64.8)	14.5 (58.1)	9.2 (48.6)	5.6 (42.1)	12.6 (54.7)
Average precipitation mm (inches)	38.4 (1.51)	30.1 (1.19)	37.8 (1.49)	43.7 (1.72)	71.2 (2.80)	19.2 (0.76)	22.2 (0.87)	53.9 (2.12)	63.2 (2.49)	86.7 (3.41)	53.0 (2.09)	40.6 (1.60)	560.0 (22.05)
Average precipitation days	5.6	5.7	6.1	7.2	7.3	3.9	3.0	5.4	7.0	8.6	6.8	6.9	73.5
Source: Climatebase.ru

Climate data for Barcelona - Fabra Observatory (1981-2010, altitude: 408 m.a.s.l., location)
Month	Jan	Feb	Mar	Apr	May	Jun	Jul	Aug	Sep	Oct	Nov	Dec	Year
Mean daily maximum °C (°F)	11.1 (52.0)	12.5 (54.5)	15.2 (59.4)	17.2 (63.0)	21.0 (69.8)	25.2 (77.4)	28.4 (83.1)	28.3 (82.9)	24.6 (76.3)	20.1 (68.2)	14.7 (58.5)	11.8 (53.2)	19.2 (66.6)
Daily mean °C (°F)	8.2 (46.8)	9.1 (48.4)	11.4 (52.5)	13.2 (55.8)	16.8 (62.2)	20.8 (69.4)	23.8 (74.8)	23.9 (75.0)	20.7 (69.3)	16.8 (62.2)	11.8 (53.2)	9.1 (48.4)	15.5 (59.9)
Mean daily minimum °C (°F)	5.3 (41.5)	5.7 (42.3)	7.6 (45.7)	9.1 (48.4)	12.5 (54.5)	16.4 (61.5)	19.3 (66.7)	19.5 (67.1)	16.7 (62.1)	13.4 (56.1)	8.8 (47.8)	6.4 (43.5)	11.7 (53.1)
Average precipitation mm (inches)	50 (2.0)	43 (1.7)	44 (1.7)	53 (2.1)	58 (2.3)	30 (1.2)	24 (0.9)	41 (1.6)	75 (3.0)	91 (3.6)	66 (2.6)	46 (1.8)	621 (24.4)
Average precipitation days (≥ 1 mm)	4.8	4.3	5.1	5.8	5.7	3.5	1.9	4.3	5.5	6.5	5.1	4.6	57.1
Mean monthly sunshine hours	166	175	188	211	248	270	304	262	190	178	158	156	2,506
Source: Agencia Estatal de Meteorología

Climate data for Badalona , suburb joined to Barcelona
Month	Jan	Feb	Mar	Apr	May	Jun	Jul	Aug	Sep	Oct	Nov	Dec	Year
Mean daily maximum °C (°F)	13.7 (56.7)	14.1 (57.4)	15.7 (60.3)	17.4 (63.3)	20.2 (68.4)	23.7 (74.7)	26.8 (80.2)	27.9 (82.2)	24.8 (76.6)	21.5 (70.7)	17.2 (63.0)	14.4 (57.9)	19.8 (67.6)
Daily mean °C (°F)	10.1 (50.2)	10.7 (51.3)	12.5 (54.5)	14.2 (57.6)	17.4 (63.3)	21.3 (70.3)	24.3 (75.7)	25.0 (77.0)	21.8 (71.2)	18.3 (64.9)	13.7 (56.7)	11.0 (51.8)	16.7 (62.1)
Mean daily minimum °C (°F)	6.7 (44.1)	7.2 (45.0)	9.3 (48.7)	11.0 (51.8)	14.6 (58.3)	18.6 (65.5)	21.7 (71.1)	21.8 (71.2)	18.8 (65.8)	15.1 (59.2)	10.3 (50.5)	7.6 (45.7)	13.6 (56.5)
Average precipitation mm (inches)	43.8 (1.72)	36.3 (1.43)	36.3 (1.43)	41.8 (1.65)	49.7 (1.96)	37.2 (1.46)	25.2 (0.99)	49.3 (1.94)	78.4 (3.09)	80.9 (3.19)	54.4 (2.14)	41.2 (1.62)	575 (22.6)
Average precipitation days (≥ 0.1 mm)	7.8	7.3	7.5	8.7	7.6	4.4	3.8	4.8	7.0	6.7	6.5	4.0	76
Average relative humidity (%)	67	65	69	72	73	72	73	73	72	73	69	68	70
Source: MeteoBDN (1981-2010, 2009-2017 for precipitation days and humidity)

Climate data for Sant Adrià de Besòs, suburb joined to Barcelona (data from 1932 to 1970)
Month	Jan	Feb	Mar	Apr	May	Jun	Jul	Aug	Sep	Oct	Nov	Dec	Year
Mean daily maximum °C (°F)	13.5 (56.3)	14.4 (57.9)	16.7 (62.1)	19.4 (66.9)	22.2 (72.0)	25.2 (77.4)	29.0 (84.2)	28.9 (84.0)	26.9 (80.4)	23.0 (73.4)	17.0 (62.6)	13.8 (56.8)	20.8 (69.4)
Daily mean °C (°F)	8.6 (47.5)	9.2 (48.6)	11.6 (52.9)	14.2 (57.6)	17.1 (62.8)	20.4 (68.7)	23.9 (75.0)	23.9 (75.0)	21.9 (71.4)	17.8 (64.0)	12.3 (54.1)	9.4 (48.9)	15.9 (60.6)
Mean daily minimum °C (°F)	3.7 (38.7)	4.0 (39.2)	6.6 (43.9)	8.9 (48.0)	12.0 (53.6)	15.6 (60.1)	18.8 (65.8)	18.9 (66.0)	16.9 (62.4)	12.5 (54.5)	7.6 (45.7)	5.0 (41.0)	10.9 (51.6)
Source: Sistema de Classificación Bioclimática Mundial

Climate data for El Prat de Llobregat, suburb joined to Barcelona (data from 1935 to 1969)
Month	Jan	Feb	Mar	Apr	May	Jun	Jul	Aug	Sep	Oct	Nov	Dec	Year
Mean daily maximum °C (°F)	12.8 (55.0)	13.8 (56.8)	15.3 (59.5)	17.8 (64.0)	20.9 (69.6)	24.6 (76.3)	27.3 (81.1)	27.4 (81.3)	25.4 (77.7)	21.5 (70.7)	17.0 (62.6)	13.7 (56.7)	19.8 (67.6)
Daily mean °C (°F)	8.4 (47.1)	9.2 (48.6)	11.2 (52.2)	13.5 (56.3)	16.4 (61.5)	20.4 (68.7)	23.0 (73.4)	23.3 (73.9)	21.4 (70.5)	17.2 (63.0)	12.7 (54.9)	9.6 (49.3)	15.5 (59.9)
Mean daily minimum °C (°F)	4.1 (39.4)	4.5 (40.1)	7.2 (45.0)	9.2 (48.6)	12.0 (53.6)	16.3 (61.3)	18.8 (65.8)	19.2 (66.6)	17.3 (63.1)	13.0 (55.4)	8.4 (47.1)	5.4 (41.7)	11.3 (52.3)
Source: Sistema de Classificación Bioclimática Mundial

Climate data for Mataró on the north-east of Barcelona (data from 1931 to 1969)
Month	Jan	Feb	Mar	Apr	May	Jun	Jul	Aug	Sep	Oct	Nov	Dec	Year
Mean daily maximum °C (°F)	14.0 (57.2)	13.7 (56.7)	15.8 (60.4)	17.2 (63.0)	20.3 (68.5)	24.0 (75.2)	26.8 (80.2)	27.3 (81.1)	25.1 (77.2)	21.6 (70.9)	16.9 (62.4)	13.8 (56.8)	19.7 (67.5)
Daily mean °C (°F)	10.3 (50.5)	10.2 (50.4)	12.3 (54.1)	14.0 (57.2)	16.9 (62.4)	20.7 (69.3)	23.5 (74.3)	23.9 (75.0)	21.7 (71.1)	18.0 (64.4)	13.6 (56.5)	10.6 (51.1)	16.3 (61.3)
Mean daily minimum °C (°F)	6.7 (44.1)	6.7 (44.1)	8.9 (48.0)	10.7 (51.3)	13.5 (56.3)	17.3 (63.1)	20.2 (68.4)	20.4 (68.7)	18.2 (64.8)	14.5 (58.1)	10.4 (50.7)	7.4 (45.3)	12.9 (55.2)
Source: Sistema de Classificación Bioclimática Mundial

Climate data for Sabadell on the north of Barcelona, on the hills (elevation: 190 m), (data from 1938-1969)
Month	Jan	Feb	Mar	Apr	May	Jun	Jul	Aug	Sep	Oct	Nov	Dec	Year
Mean daily maximum °C (°F)	12.6 (54.7)	14.2 (57.6)	17.0 (62.6)	19.6 (67.3)	22.8 (73.0)	26.8 (80.2)	29.6 (85.3)	29.1 (84.4)	26.3 (79.3)	21.9 (71.4)	16.7 (62.1)	12.9 (55.2)	20.8 (69.4)
Daily mean °C (°F)	7.5 (45.5)	8.8 (47.8)	11.2 (52.2)	13.6 (56.5)	16.8 (62.2)	20.6 (69.1)	23.5 (74.3)	23.3 (73.9)	20.9 (69.6)	16.5 (61.7)	11.5 (52.7)	8.1 (46.6)	15.2 (59.4)
Mean daily minimum °C (°F)	2.4 (36.3)	3.4 (38.1)	5.4 (41.7)	7.6 (45.7)	10.8 (51.4)	14.5 (58.1)	17.5 (63.5)	17.6 (63.7)	15.5 (59.9)	11.1 (52.0)	6.4 (43.5)	3.4 (38.1)	9.6 (49.3)
Source: Sistema de Classificación Bioclimática Mundial

Climate data for Caldes de Montbui on the north-west of Barcelona, on the hills (elevation: 203 m (666 ft), data from 1941-1969)
Month	Jan	Feb	Mar	Apr	May	Jun	Jul	Aug	Sep	Oct	Nov	Dec	Year
Mean daily maximum °C (°F)	13.3 (55.9)	14.7 (58.5)	17.7 (63.9)	20.5 (68.9)	23.7 (74.7)	27.7 (81.9)	30.9 (87.6)	29.9 (85.8)	27.4 (81.3)	23.0 (73.4)	17.6 (63.7)	13.6 (56.5)	21.7 (71.1)
Daily mean °C (°F)	6.7 (44.1)	7.8 (46.0)	10.6 (51.1)	13.1 (55.6)	16.3 (61.3)	20.2 (68.4)	23.3 (73.9)	23.0 (73.4)	20.6 (69.1)	16.2 (61.2)	11.0 (51.8)	7.5 (45.5)	14.7 (58.5)
Mean daily minimum °C (°F)	0.0 (32.0)	0.9 (33.6)	3.6 (38.5)	5.7 (42.3)	8.9 (48.0)	12.8 (55.0)	15.7 (60.3)	16.2 (61.2)	13.8 (56.8)	9.5 (49.1)	4.4 (39.9)	1.5 (34.7)	7.8 (46.0)
Source: Sistema de Classificación Bioclimática Mundial

Climate data for Martorell on the west of Barcelona in the depths of the land (elevation: 56 m, data from 1964-1970)
Month	Jan	Feb	Mar	Apr	May	Jun	Jul	Aug	Sep	Oct	Nov	Dec	Year
Mean daily maximum °C (°F)	11.6 (52.9)	12.8 (55.0)	16.3 (61.3)	20.7 (69.3)	25.8 (78.4)	29.5 (85.1)	33.0 (91.4)	31.3 (88.3)	26.3 (79.3)	21.2 (70.2)	15.0 (59.0)	10.8 (51.4)	21.2 (70.2)
Daily mean °C (°F)	6.8 (44.2)	7.6 (45.7)	10.4 (50.7)	14.1 (57.4)	18.4 (65.1)	21.9 (71.4)	25.4 (77.7)	24.8 (76.6)	20.8 (69.4)	16.2 (61.2)	10.2 (50.4)	6.6 (43.9)	15.3 (59.5)
Mean daily minimum °C (°F)	2.1 (35.8)	2.4 (36.3)	4.6 (40.3)	7.5 (45.5)	11.1 (52.0)	14.3 (57.7)	17.9 (64.2)	18.4 (65.1)	15.4 (59.7)	11.1 (52.0)	5.5 (41.9)	2.5 (36.5)	9.4 (48.9)
Source: Sistema de Classificación Bioclimática Mundial

== See also ==
Climate in other places in Iberian Peninsula:

- Climate of Valencia
- Climate of Madrid
- Climate of Bilbao
- Climate of Lisbon
- Climate of Porto
- Climate of Spain
- Climate of Gibraltar
