= Western Mediterranean oscillation =

The Western Mediterranean oscillation (WeMO or WeMOi) is an index measuring the difference between the standardized atmospheric pressure recorded at Padua (45.40◦N, 11.48◦E) in northern Italy, and San Fernando, Cádiz (36.28◦N, 6.12◦W) in Southwestern Spain. Whereas Padua is an area with a relatively high barometric variability due to the influence of the central European anticyclone, San Fernando is often under the influence of the Azores High.

This index has been proposed as a teleconnection by researches in the Climatology Group at the University of Barcelona offering an alternative to the more widely known NAO for studying the variability in rainfall in eastern Spain, in regions such as Catalonia, Valencia, and Murcia.

The WeMOi barometric pattern is believed by some climatologists to be causally related to, and thus partially predictive of, rainfall variability on the eastern side of the Iberian Peninsula. A Positive phase of the WeMOi typically shows an anticyclone in the Gulf of Cádiz area and a low-pressure area by the Ligurian Sea whereas a Negative WeMOi phase will show a Low in the Gulf of Cádiz and an anticyclone in Central Europe. During the Positive phase, the prevailing winds in the Iberian Peninsula are typically West and NorthWest, originating in the North Atlantic area; these winds, at the time of reaching the Eastern side of the Peninsula, have travelled over the peninsula’s continental areas, so they have become dry and warm (westerly winds) or cooler but equally dry (north-westerly). In contrast, a Negative WeMOi phase is associated to humid airflows which have travelled over the Mediterranean Sea; these are therefore laden with moisture when they reach the eastern side of the Iberian Peninsula, leading to increased -sometimes torrential- precipitation in this area.
