= Plug-in electric vehicles in Spain =

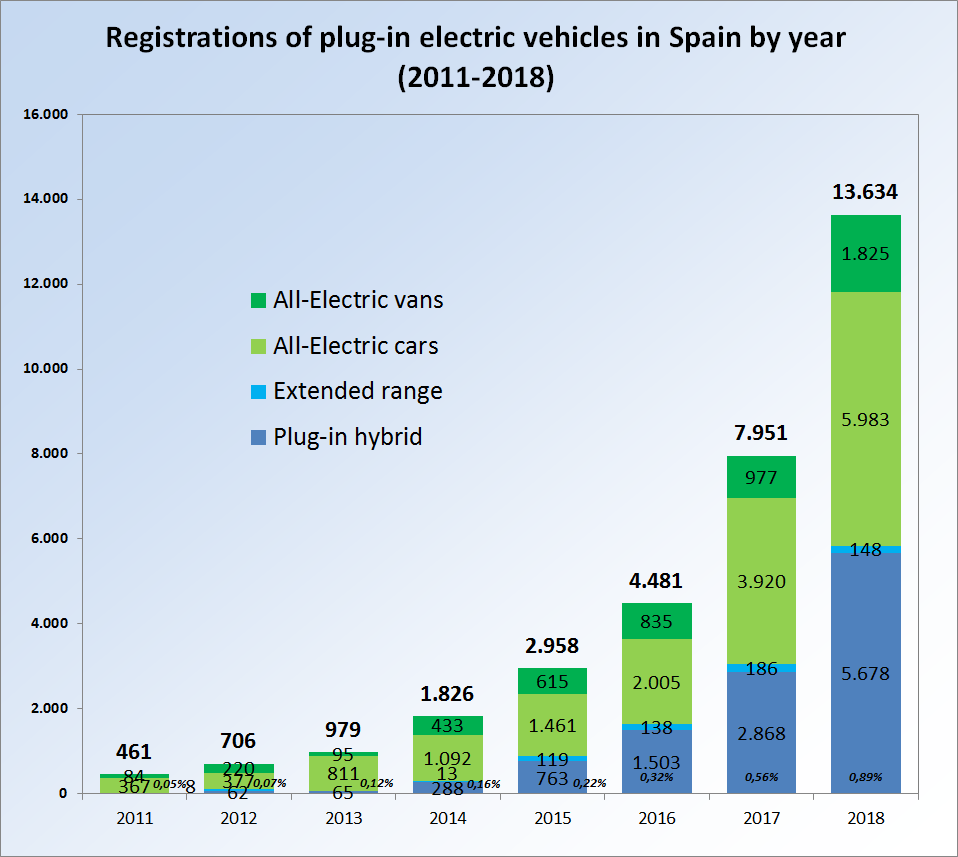
EV registrations in Spain by year between 2010 and 2018.

As of October 2022, there were 200,000 electric vehicles in Spain. As of September 2022, 6.8% of new cars registered in Spain were battery electric, and 7.4% were plug-in hybrid. Spain has a target for five million EVs in the country by 2030.

== Government policy ==
As of May 2022, the Spanish government offers tax subsidies of €5,000 for electric vehicle purchases (€7,000 if the buyer turns in a gasoline-powered car).

== Charging stations ==
As of May 2022, there were 13,411 public charging station ports in Spain. As of October 2022, there were 124 public DC charging stations in Spain.

== Public opinion ==
In a 2022 poll conducted by Roland Berger, 63% of respondents said that they intend to purchase an electric car for their next vehicle purchase.

== Manufacturing ==
As of September 2022, around 9,300 electric vehicles were being manufactured per month in Spain.

== By autonomous community ==
=== Asturias ===
As of October 2022, there were four public DC charging stations in Asturias.

=== Canary Islands ===
As of February 2023, there were 34 public charging stations on Gran Canaria.

=== Extremadura ===
As of October 2022, there were no public DC charging stations in Extremadura.
