= List of Complutense University of Madrid alumni =

This list of Complutense University of Madrid alumni includes notable graduates of Complutense University of Madrid.

== Government ==
Pre–20th century

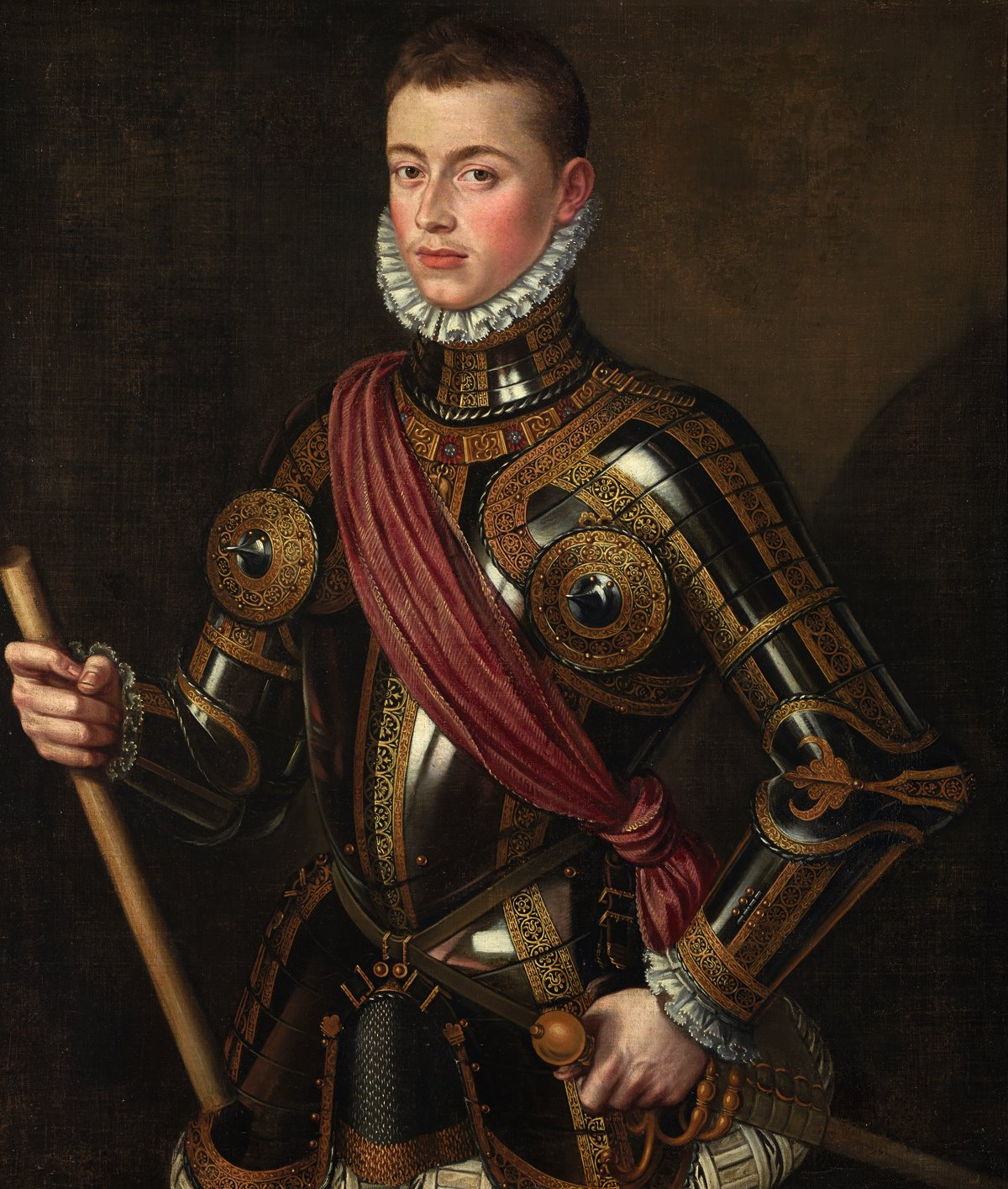
John of Austria

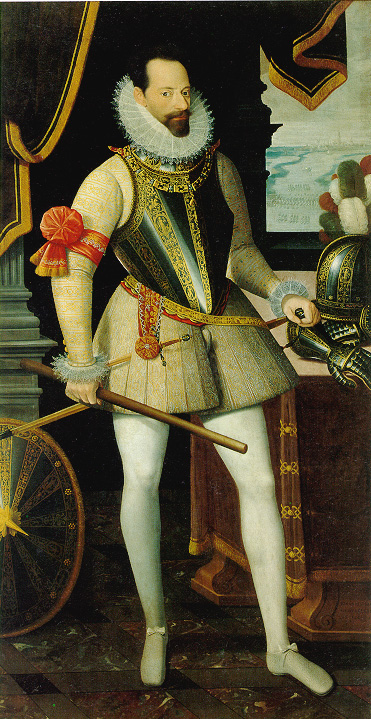
Alexander Farnese

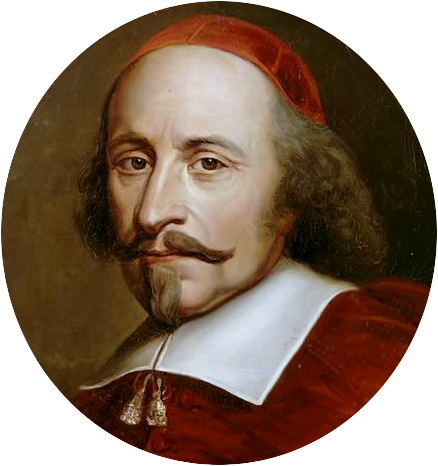
Cardinal Mazarin

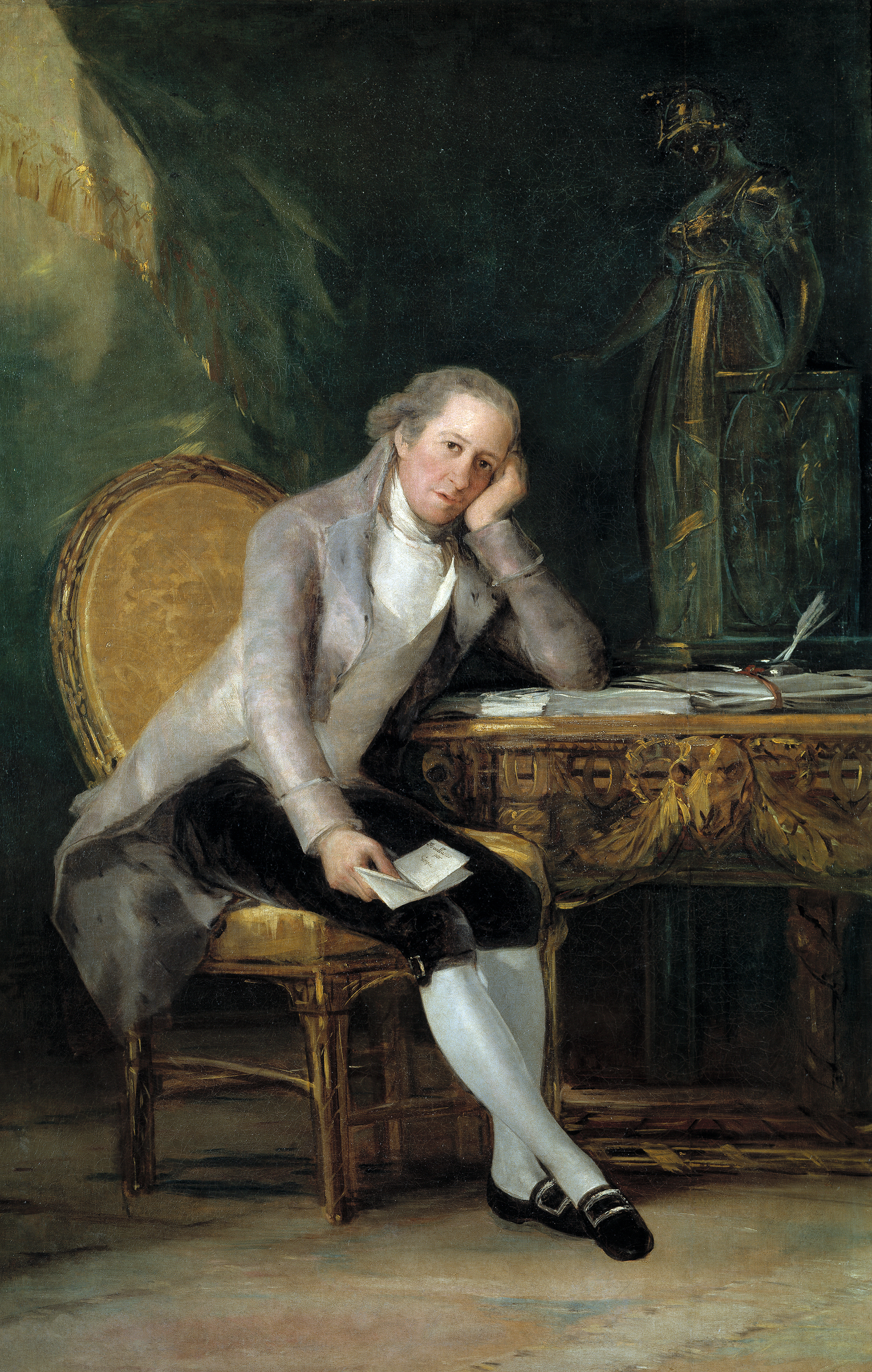
Gaspar Melchor de Jovellanos

- Don John of Austria – Victor of the Battle of Lepanto, Spanish Governor of the Netherlands, Grandee of Spain, the last Knight of Europe.
- Alexander Farnese, Duke of Parma and Piacenza.
- Cardinal Mazarin – 2nd Prime Minister of France (1642–1661), successor of Cardinal Richelieu.
- Gaspar de Borja y Velasco – Served as Primate of Spain, Archbishop of Seville, Archbishop of Toledo and viceroy of Naples.
- Gaspar Melchor de Jovellanos – Prime Minister of Spain, theorist behind the Constitution of 1812
- Nicolás Salmerón y Alonso – President of the First Spanish Republic
- Emilio Castelar y Ripoll – Journalist, Essayist, Minister during the First Spanish Republic

II Spanish Republic

- Manuel Azaña – Head of State & President of Spain at various points throughout the Second Spanish Republic
- Juan Negrín López – Last President of the Second Spanish Republic
- Gregorio Marañón – Spanish physician, scientist, historian, writer, philosopher and political reformer
- Julián Besteiro Fernández – Socialist Politician, Deputy during the Second Spanish Republic
- Clara Campoamor – Feminist Politician, Deputy during the Second Spanish Republic
- Victoria Kent – Essayist, Feminist, Deputy during the Second Spanish Republic
- Claudio Sánchez–Albornoz y Menduiña – Historian, Deputy during the Second Spanish Republic
- Fernando de los Ríos Urruti – Anarquist Politician during the Second Spanish Republic

Transition and Contemporary Administrations

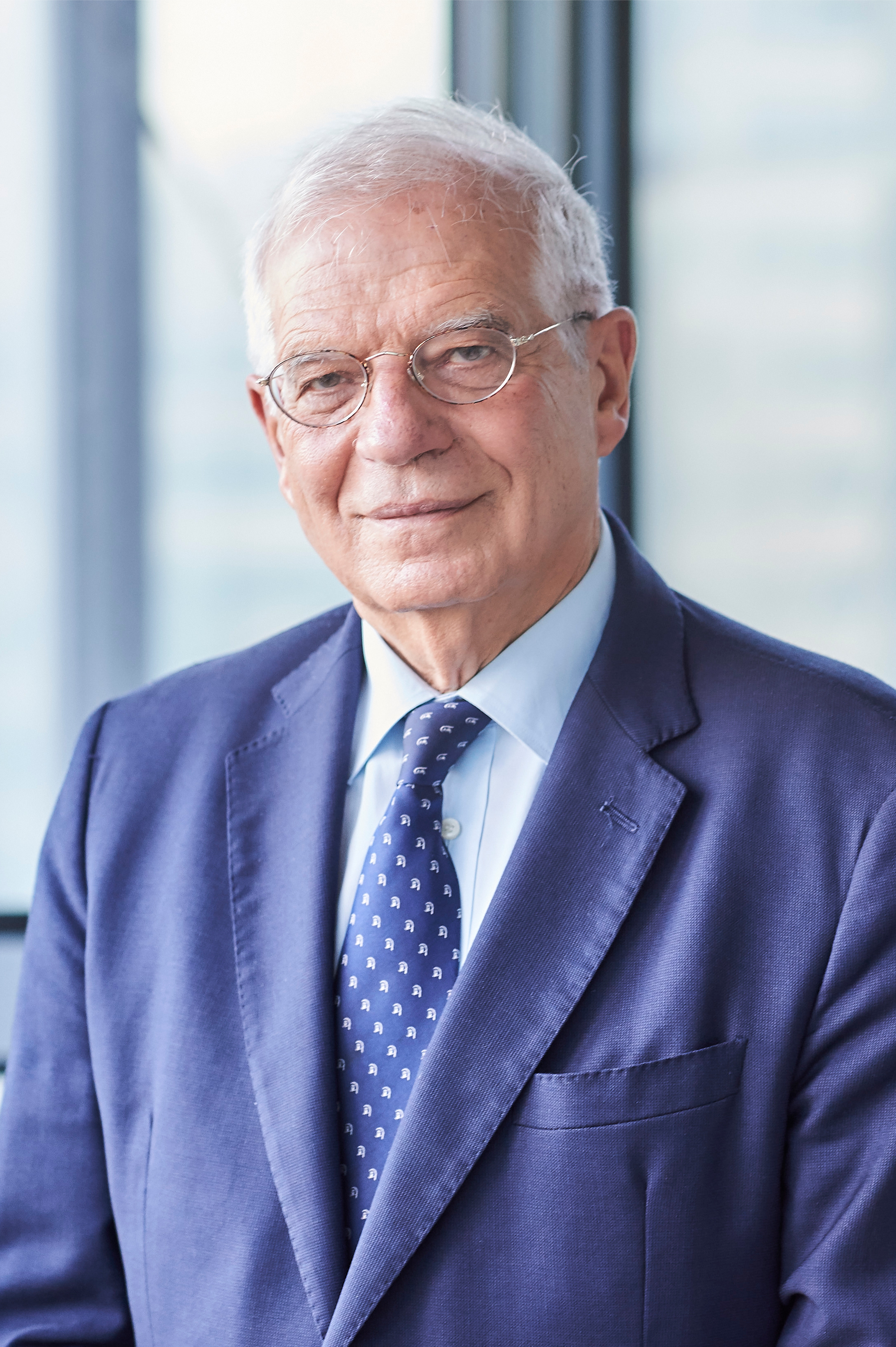
Josep Borrell

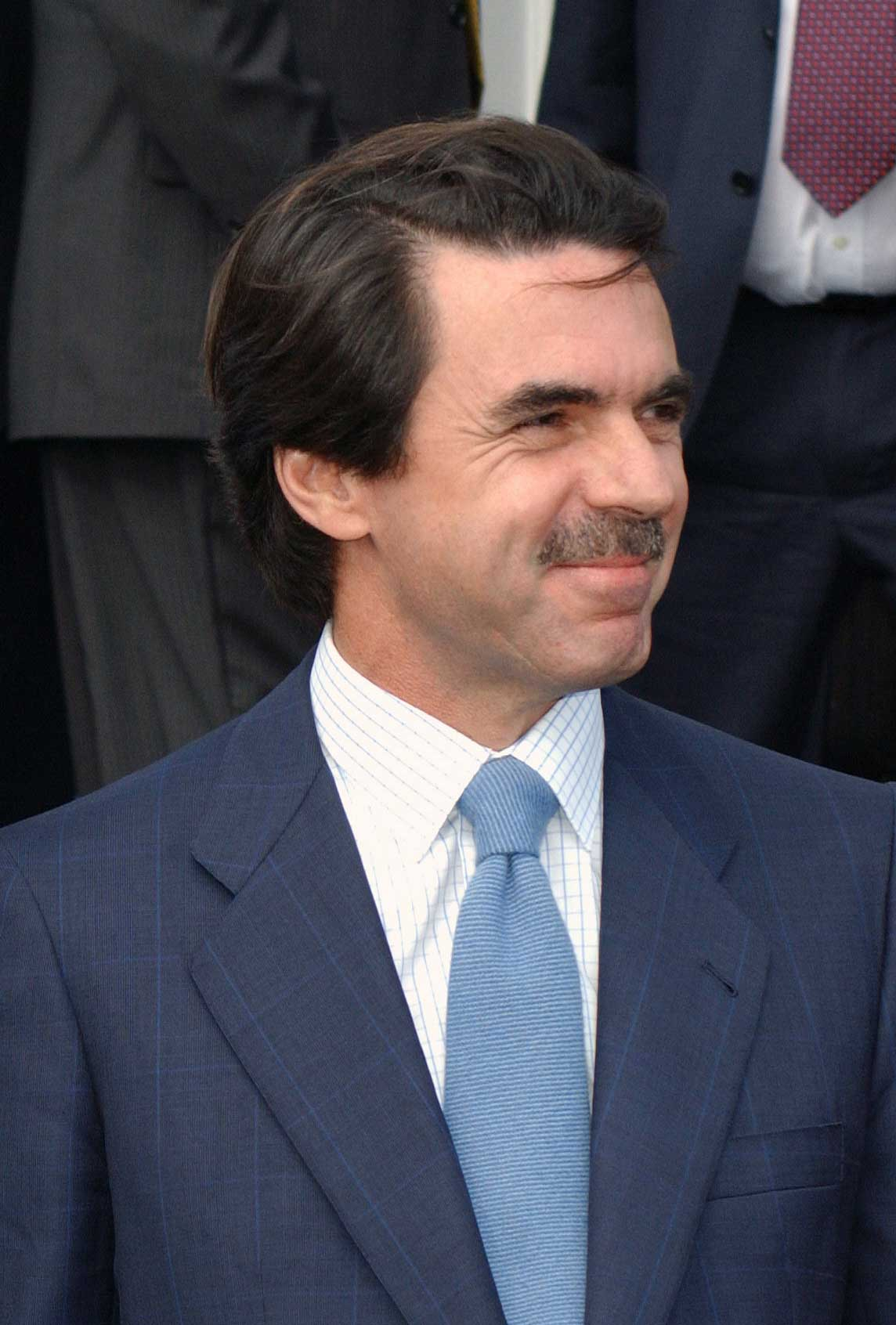
José María Aznar

- Adolfo Suárez – first democratically elected Prime Minister after the Franco regime
- Américo Castro – Politician, Spanish cultural historian, philologist, and literary critic
- José María Aznar – Former President of the Spanish Government (1996–2004)
- Javier Solana – European Union foreign policy chief and former NATO Secretary General
- Esperanza Aguirre – Former regional President of Madrid
- Enrique Barón Crespo – President of the European Parliament
- Manuel Fraga Iribarne – Former interior minister/father of the Spanish Constitution of 1978/founder and president of the Spanish conservative People's Party/former president of the Xunta de Galicia/member of the Spanish Senate
- María Teresa Fernández de la Vega – Former vice president of the Spanish Government (2004–)
- Marcelino Oreja Aguirre – Secretary General of the Council of Europe/Member of the European Parliament /European Commissioner for Transport/European Commissioner for Institutional Relations and Communication Strategy
- Manuel Prado y Colón de Carvajal – Spanish diplomat/Politician/Royal Senator/Administrator of the Royal Household

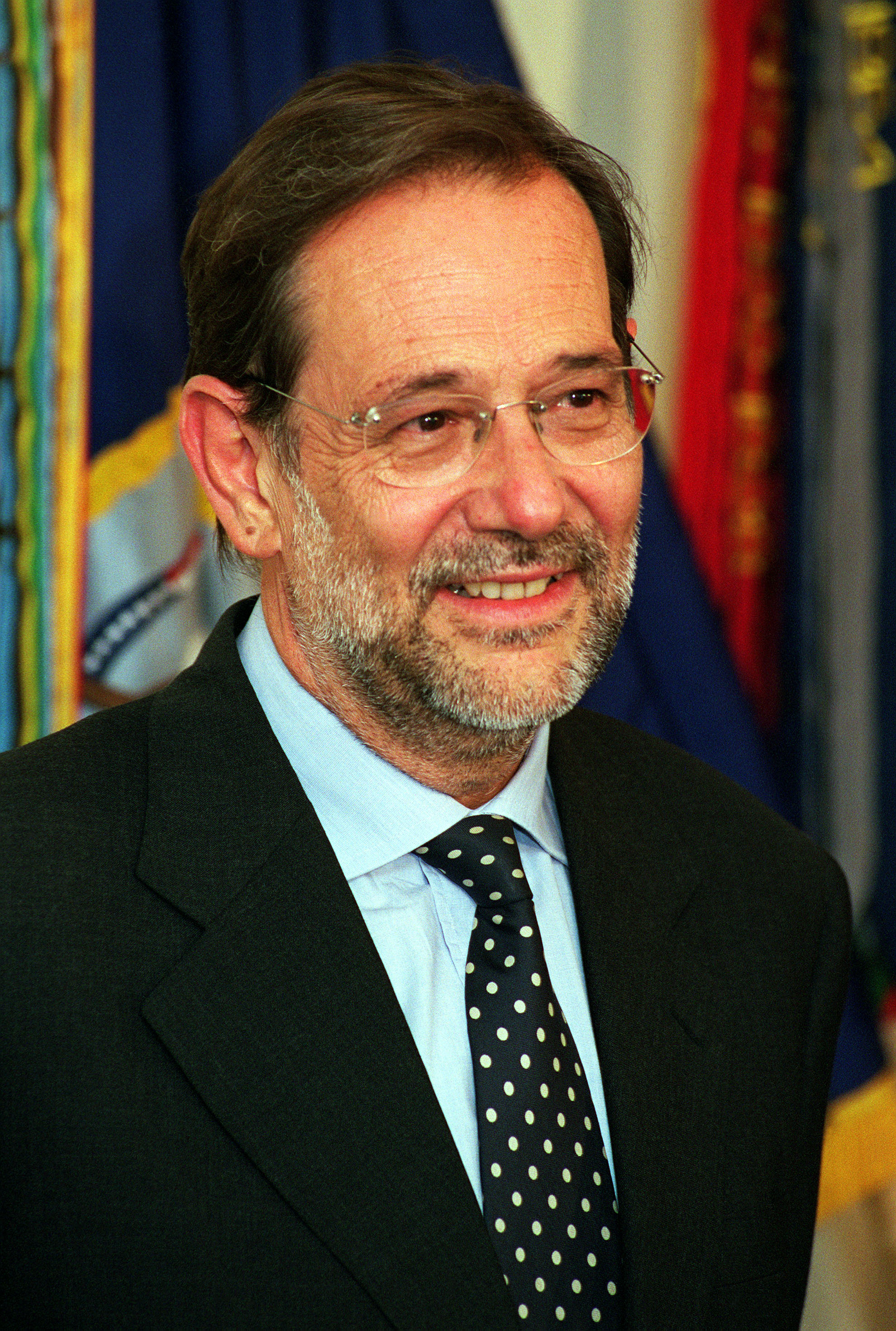
Javier Solana

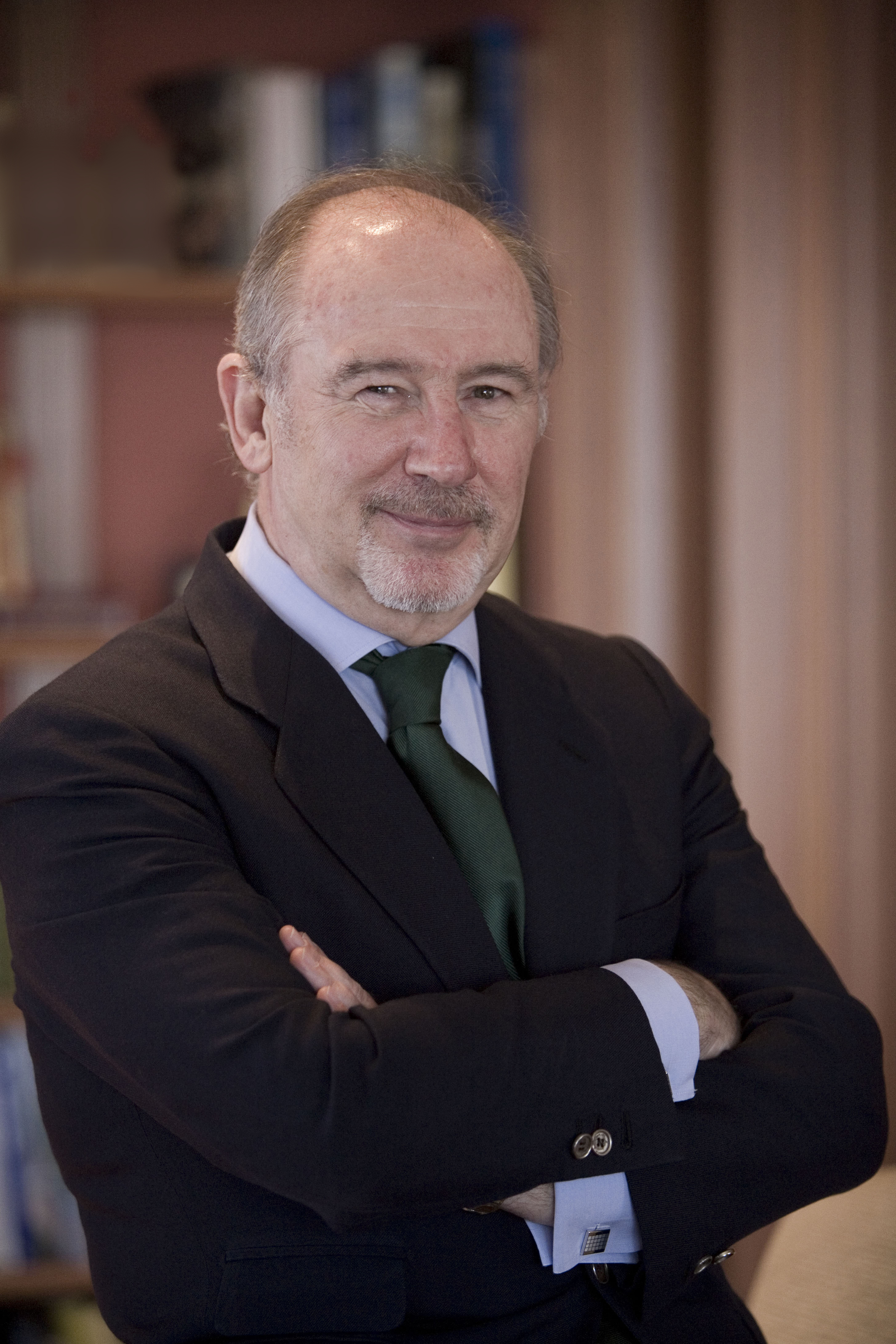
Rodrigo Rato

- Rodrigo Rato – Politician/former Spanish Minister of Economy and Finance/9th Chairman of the International Monetary Fund
- Josep Borrell – former president of the European Parliament and former High Representative of the Union for Foreign Affairs and Security Policy
- Manuel Marín – former member of the European Commission and President during the interim Santer Commission/President of the Congress of Deputies of Spain
- José Bono – former president of Castile–La Mancha, former Defense Minister, former president of the Spanish Congress of Deputies
- Ana Palacio – former Spanish minister of foreign affairs
- Alfredo Pérez Rubalcaba – Chemist/ former minister of the Ministry of Education (Spain), former Defense Minister, former minister of the Spanish Interior Minister
- Elena Salgado – former Spanish Minister of Economy and Finance
- German Vargas Lleras – former Ministry of the Interior and Justice (Colombia)
- José María Barreda – former president of Castile–La Mancha
- José Manuel González Paramo – former member of the Executive Board of the European Central Bank
- Isabel Díaz Ayuso – Politician and president of the Community of Madrid
- Juan Pizarro Navarrete – former deputy and former member of the Parliament of Andalusia
- Sara Aagesen – current Secretary of State for Energy
- Teresa Ribera – current First Executive Vice-President of the European Commission

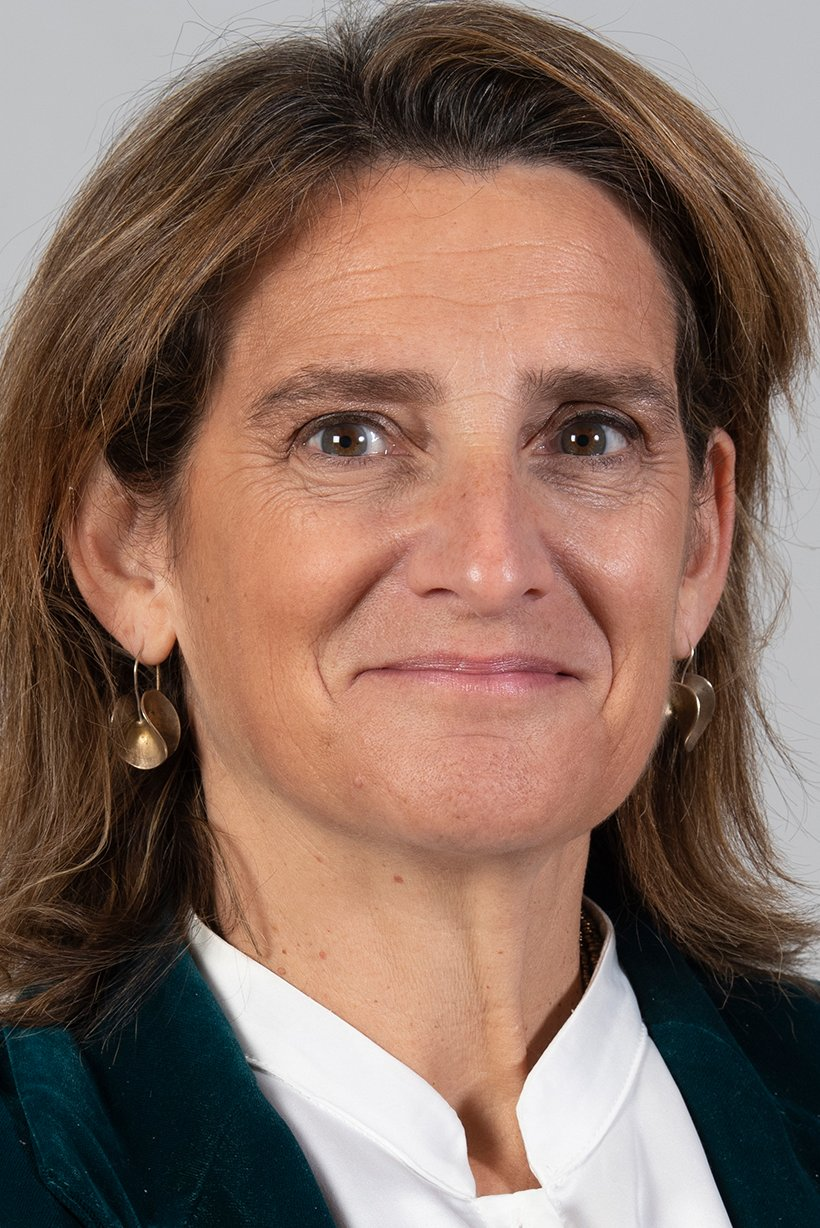
Teresa Ribera

Foreign Government Figures

- Luis J. Lauredo – former United States Ambassador to the Organization of American States and executive director of the First Summit of the Americas
- Mario Crisostomo Belisario – former Philippine Ambassador to Romania, Hungary, Consul, and Assistant Secretary of the Philippine Department of Foreign Affairs
- Manuel Sarmiento Enverga- former Congressman of the First District of Quezon Province, lawyer, academic, and founder of Enverga University, finished Doctor of Civil Law.

Royalty

- Infanta Cristina of Spain – Spanish princess, the younger daughter of King Juan Carlos I and Queen Sofía of Spain.
- Letizia Ortiz Rocasolano – Queen consort of Spain
- Miriam, Princess of Turnovo – Spanish jewellery designer and member of the Bulgarian royal family

== Journalism and literature ==
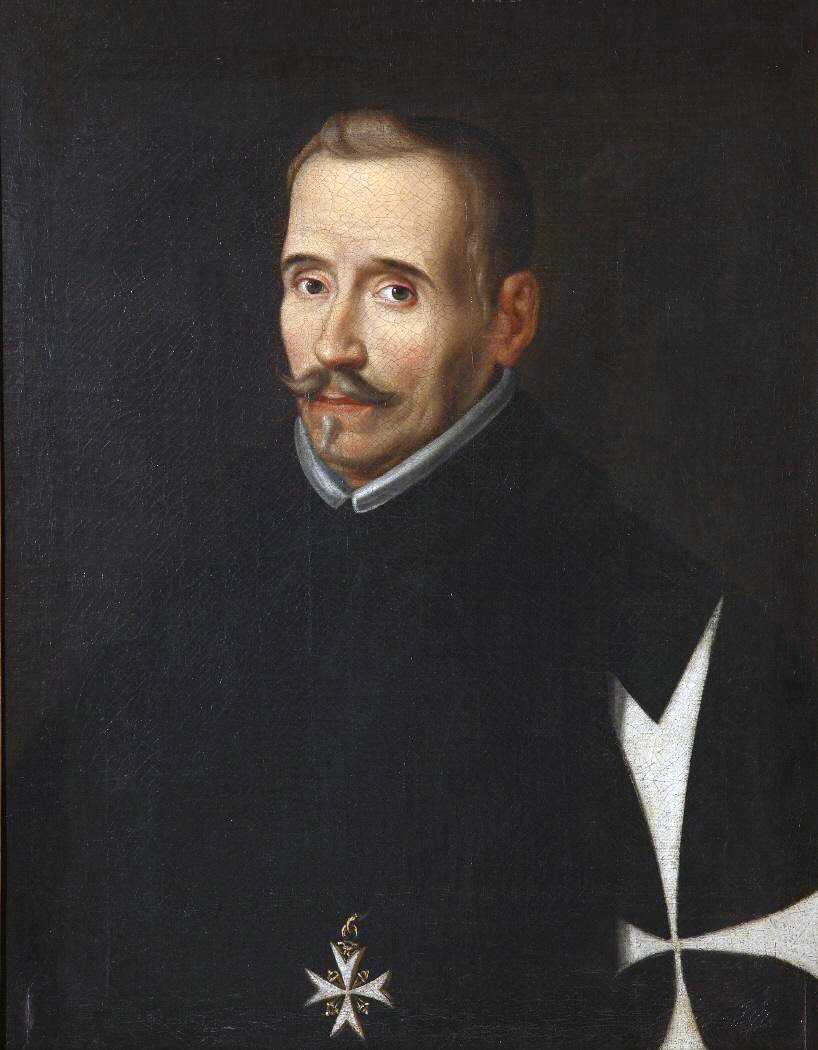
Lope de Vega

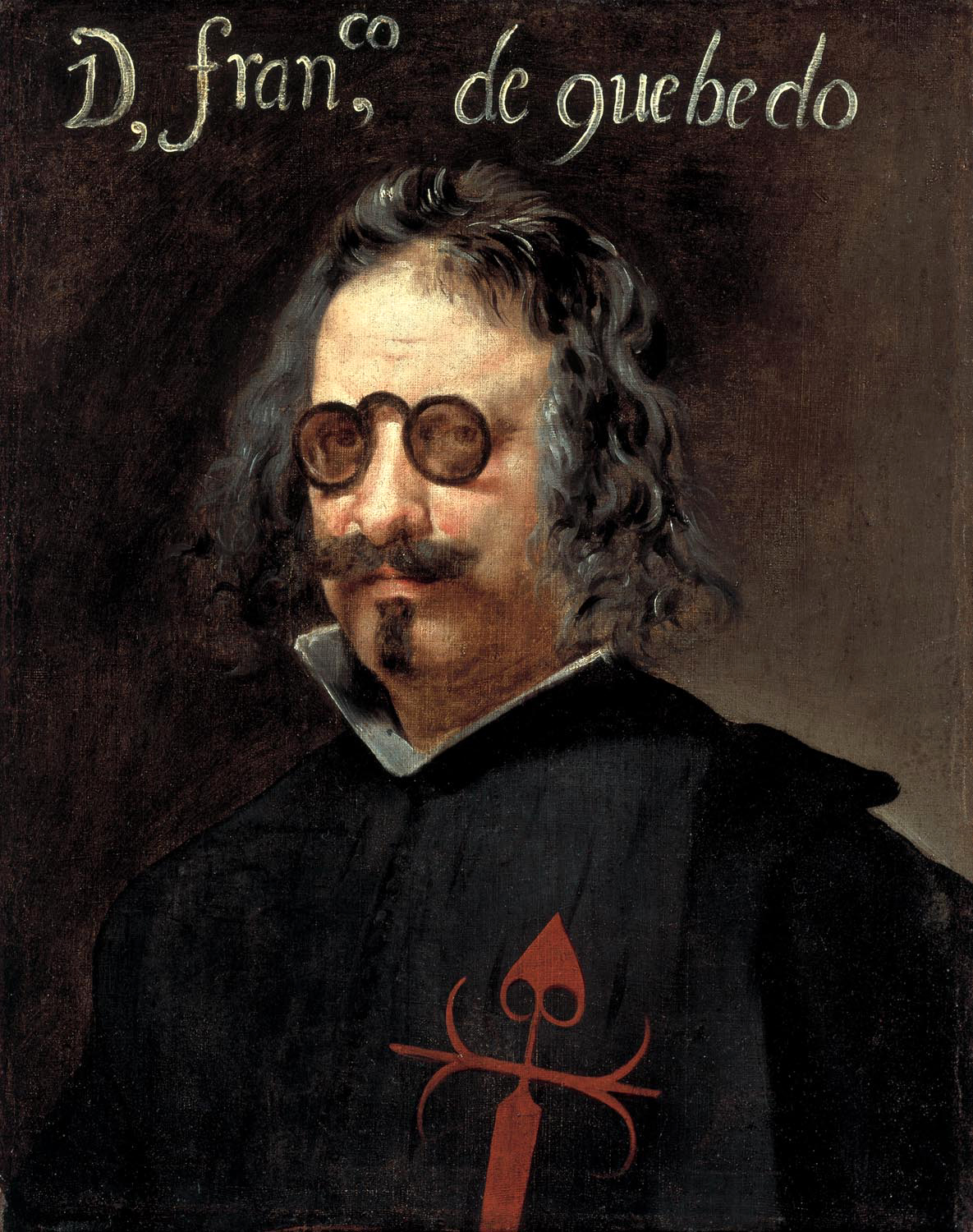
Francisco de Quevedo

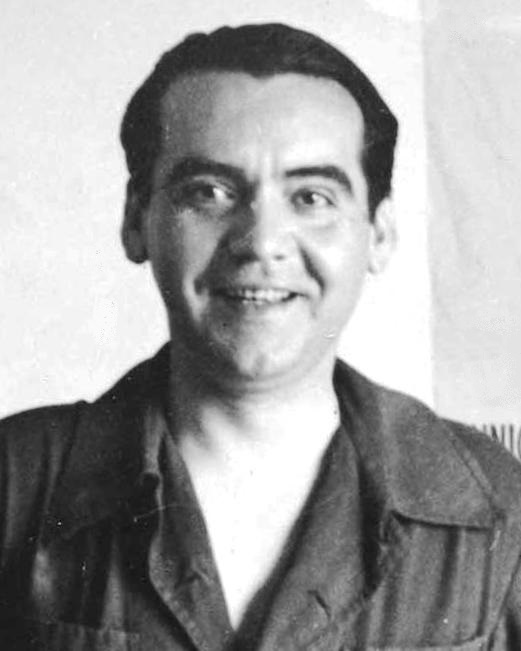
Federico García Lorca

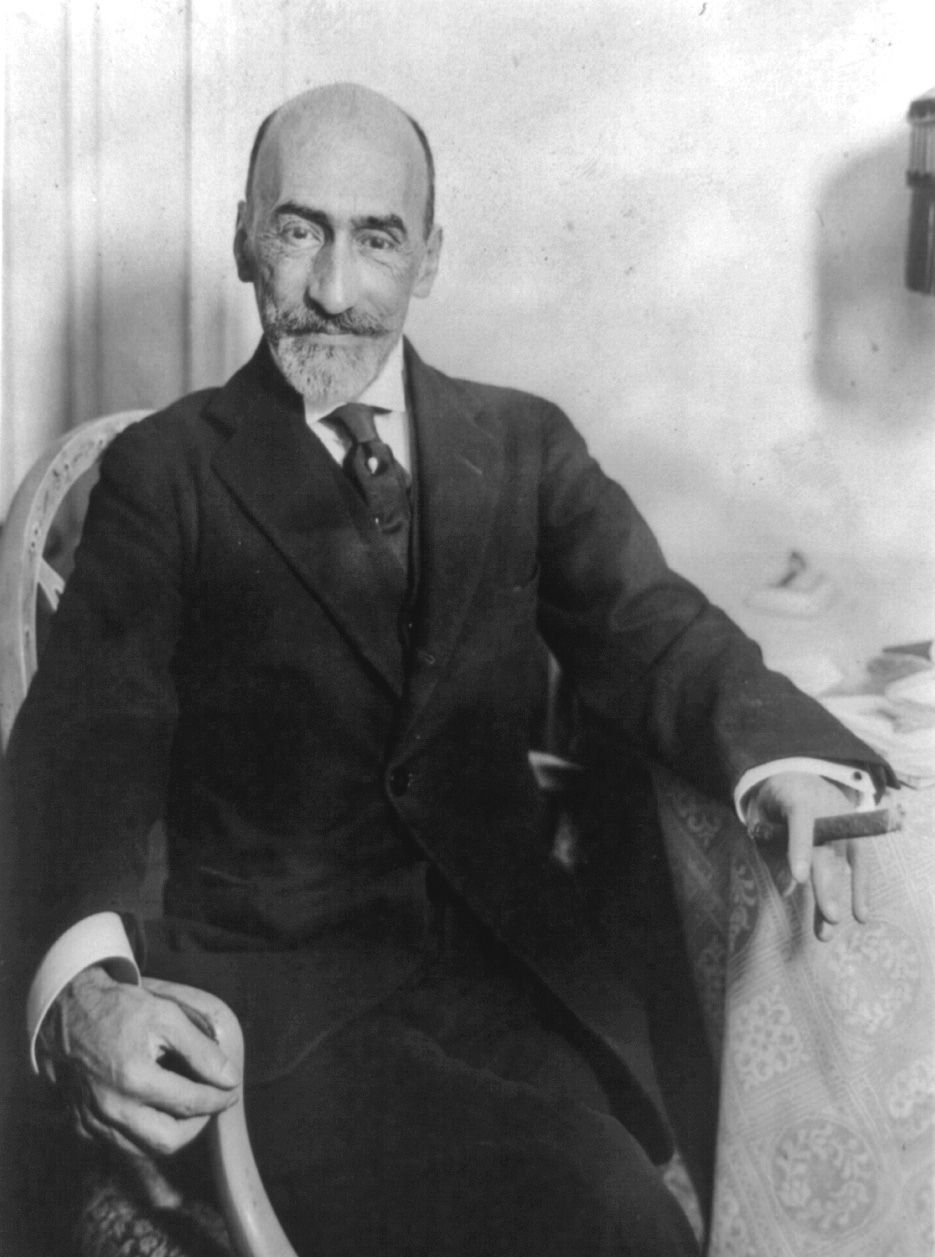
Jacinto Benavente

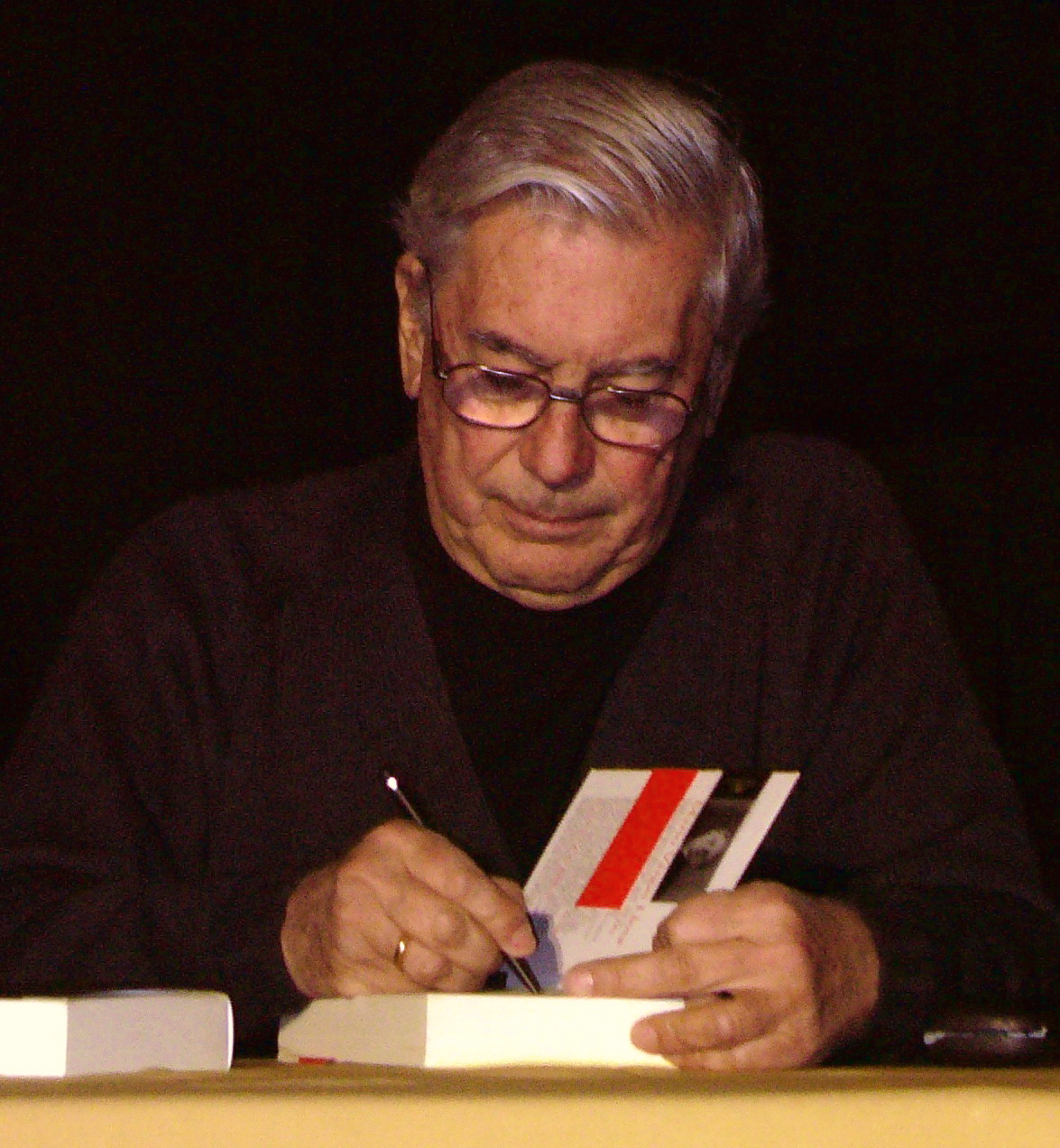
Mario Vargas Llosa

- Antonio de Nebrija – writer, grammarian
- Antonio Machado – poet, member of the Generación del '98 literary movement
- Basilio Rodríguez Cañada – writer, president of the PEN Club of Spain
- Camilo José Cela – writer, poet, Nobel Prize in Literature (1989), Miguel de Cervantes Prize Recipient, member of the Generación del '50 literary movement
- Carmen Camacho (writer) - writer, columnist
- Concepción Arenal – journalist, essayist, political figure
- Dámaso Alonso y Fernández de las Redondas – writer, poet, philologist, member of the Generación del '27 literary movement, Miguel de Cervantes Prize Recipient
- Enrique Tierno Galván – writer, politician
- Elísabet Benavent – romance writer
- Federico García Lorca – poet, playwright
- Paloma García Ovejero – journalist, news broadcaster, first woman vice director of the Holy See Press Office
- Félix Lope de Vega y Carpio – Spanish playwright
- Fermín Caballero – early journalist / publisher, Congressional Deputy

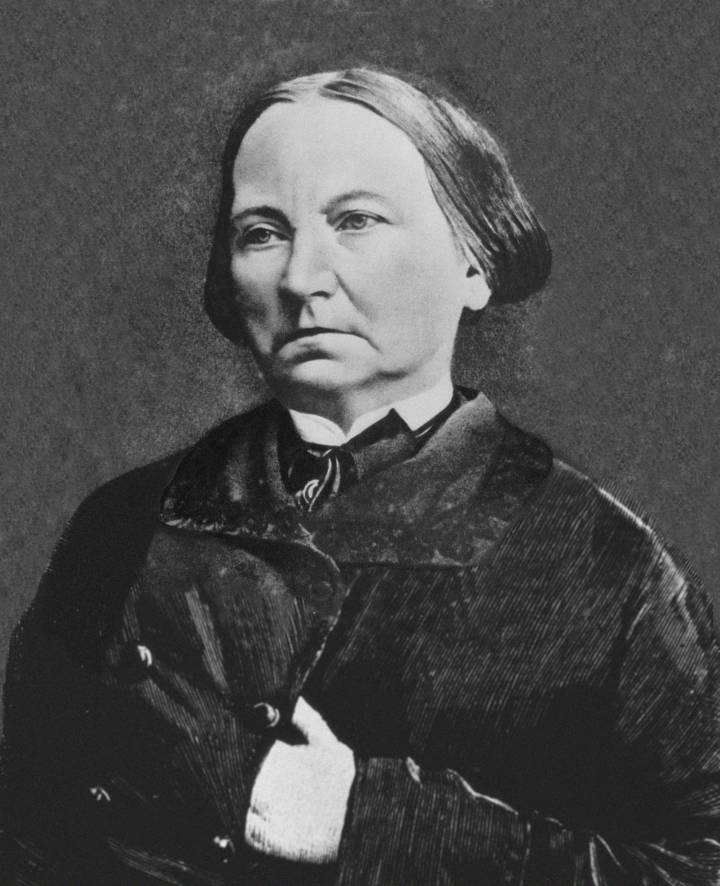
Concepción Arenal

- Francisco Ayala – writer, Nobel Prize for Literature Candidate, Principe de Asturias Award for Literature, Miguel de Cervantes Prize Recipient
- Francisco de Quevedo – classical writer
- Gerardo Diego – writer, poet, Member of the Spanish Royal Academy, Member of the Generación del '27 literary movement, Miguel de Cervantes Prize Recipient
- Giannina Braschi – author of Empire of Dreams, Yo–Yo Boing!, and United States of Banana
- Jacinto Benavente – playwright, Nobel Prize in Literature (1922)
- Javier Marías – writer, translator, member of the Spanish Royal Academy
- José Echegaray y Eizaguirre – writer, Nobel Prize in Literature (1904)
- José Rodríguez Carracido – writer, pharmacist, chemist
- Mar Abad – Spanish journalist, writer, businesswoman
- María Zambrano – writer, philosopher
- Mario Vargas Llosa – Peruvian writer (naturalized Spaniard), Principe de Asturias Award, Miguel de Cervantes Prize, Nobel Prize in Literature (2010)
- Mercedes Gallego – journalist and author
- Miguel de Unamuno – writer, member of the Generación del '98 literary movement, Neo–Humanist Philosopher
- Mónica Martínez, journalist, television presenter
- Pío Baroja – writer, member of the Generación del '98 literary movement
- Ramiro Ledesma Ramos – writer, politician
- Torcuato Luca de Tena y Álvarez–Ossorio – journalist, founder of ABC
- Juan Ignacio Luca de Tena – journalist, playwright, diplomat
- Vicente Aleixandre – writer, poet, Nobel Prize in Literature (1970)
- Xosé Luís Méndez Ferrín – writer
- José Ortega Spottorno – journalist, founder of Alianza Editorial, co–founder of El País
- Jesús de Polanco – journalist, co–founder of El País, founder of Editorial Santillana, Grupo PRISA and Cadena SER
- Juan Luis Cebrián – journalist, co–founder and former editor–in–chief of El País, member of the Real Academia Española, head of Grupo PRISA
- Ribhi Kamal, Palestinian writer, teacher, and radio broadcaster.
- Queen Letizia of Spain, Queen consort of Spain, former journalist at RTVE and EFE
- Carmen Porter – mystery journalist

== Philosophy ==
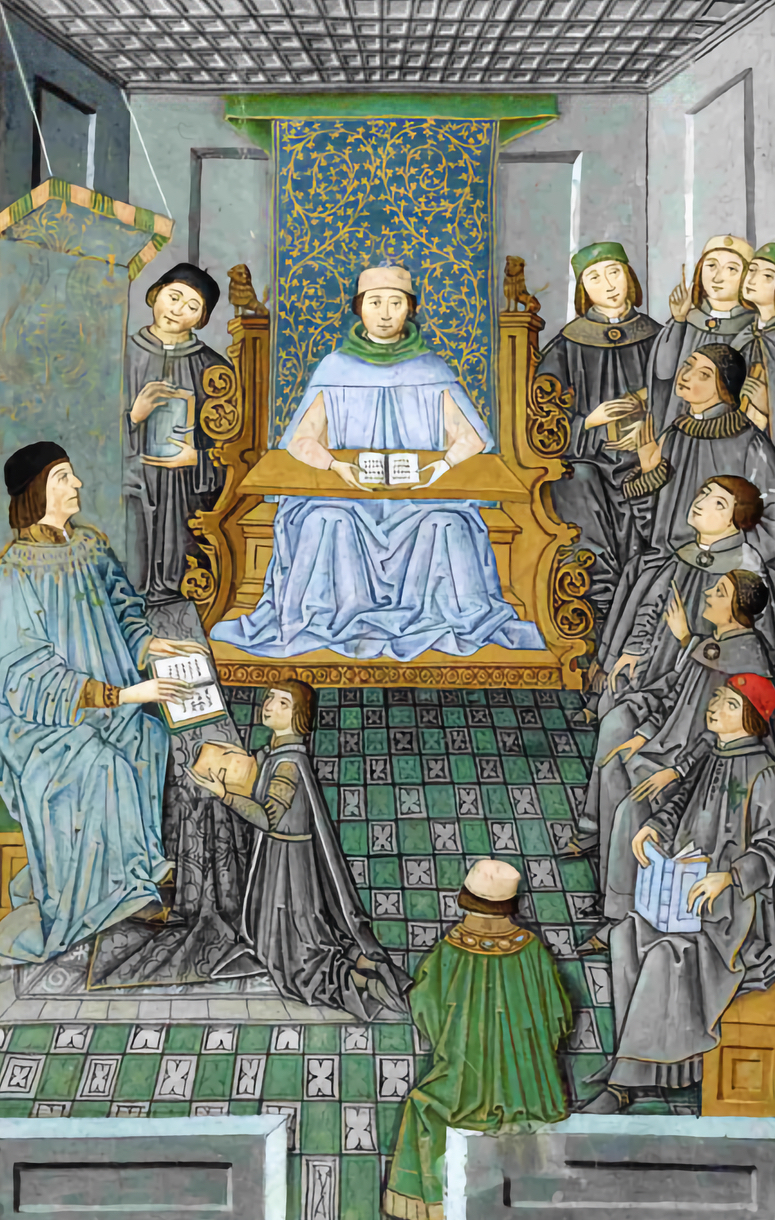
Antonio de Nebrija teaching grammar in the presence of D. Juan de Zúñiga

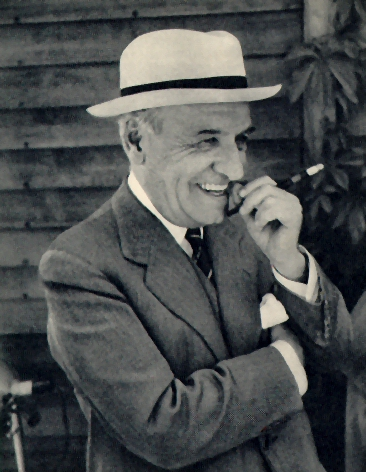
José Ortega y Gasset

- Antonio de Nebrija – Renaissance Humanist, Philologist
- Domingo de Soto – Philosopher, Theologian, Theorist at the Council of Trent
- Fernando Savater – Philosopher
- José Gaos y González Pola – Neo–Humanist Philosopher
- Jose Luis López Aranguren – Philosopher
- José Ortega y Gasset – Neo–Humanist Philosopher, Founder of Ratio–Vitalism, Writer, Journalist, Deputy during the Second Spanish Republic
- Julián Marías – Philosopher
- Francisco Elías de Tejada y Spínola – Philosopher, Law Theorist, Political Theorist
- María Isidra de Guzmán y de la Cerda – First woman to earn a doctorate in Spain, Philosopher
- Raimon Panikkar – Philosopher, Theologian, Scholar of Comparative Philosophy of Religion
- Tomás de Villanueva – Roman Catholic Saint, Archbishop of Valencia, Theologian
- Xavier Zubiri Apalategui – Philosopher, Philologist
- María Zambrano – Philosopher

== History ==
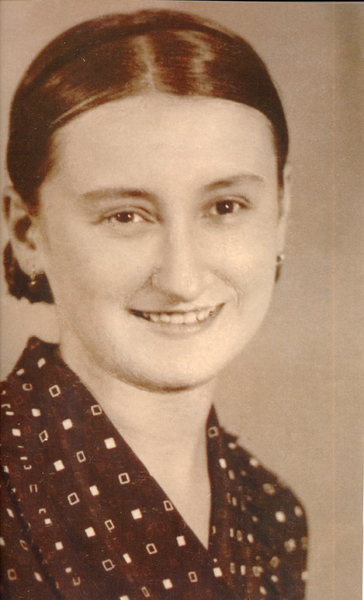
María Luz Navarro Mayor

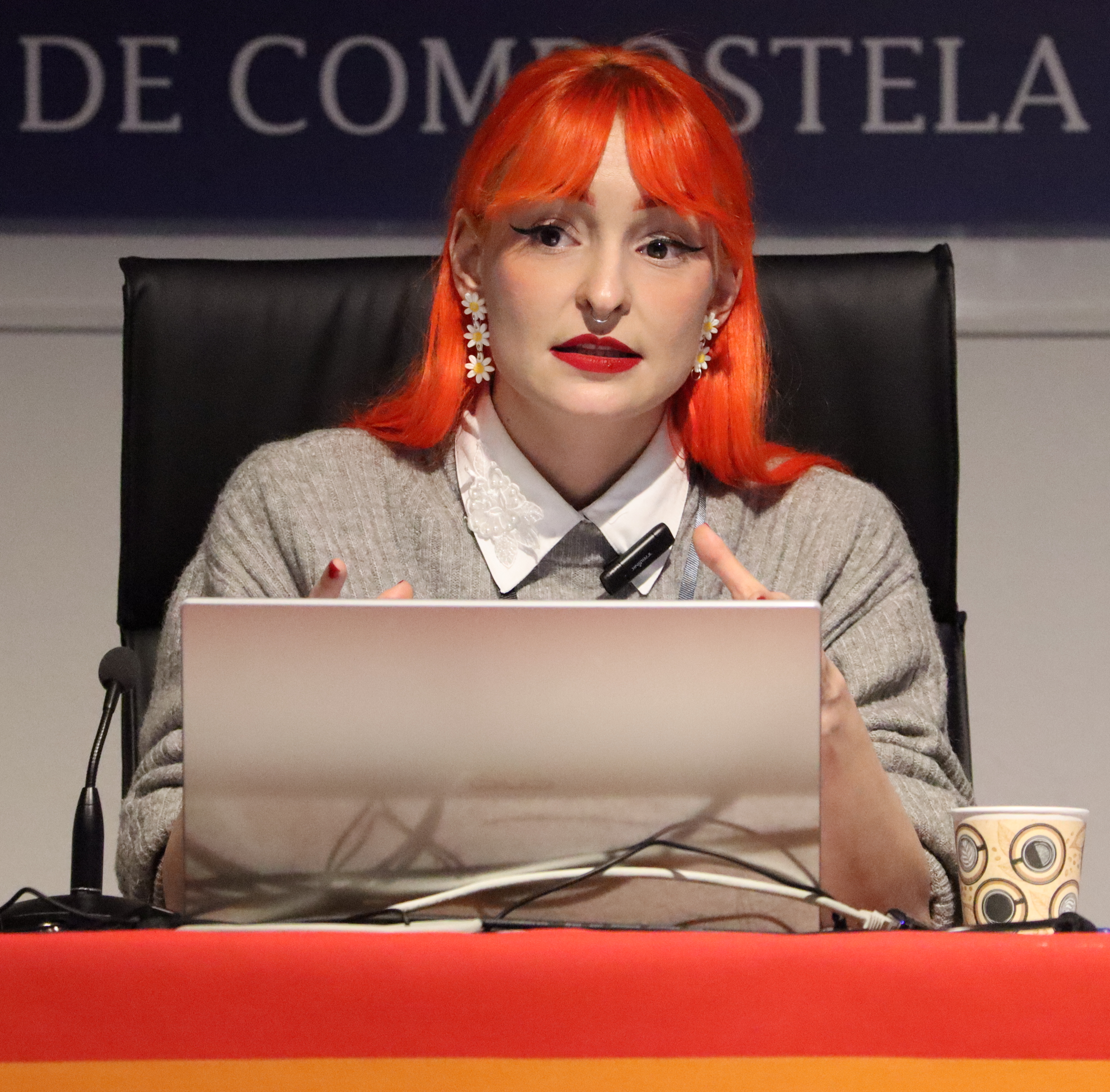
- Eugenia Tenenbaum
  Carmen Agulló Díaz – History of Education professor
- Ambrosio de Morales – historian
- Francisco Giner de los Ríos – Historian
- Juan de Mariana – historian, Political Theorist
- María Luz Navarro Mayor - curator
- Beatriz Rico – neurologist
- José Amador de los Ríos – historian
- Manuel Colmeiro Penido – economist, historian, jurist
- Marcelino Menéndez y Pelayo – scholar, historian
- Ramón Menéndez Pidal – historian
- Salvador Salort–Pons – art historian
- Eugenia Tenenbaum – art historian

== Medicine ==
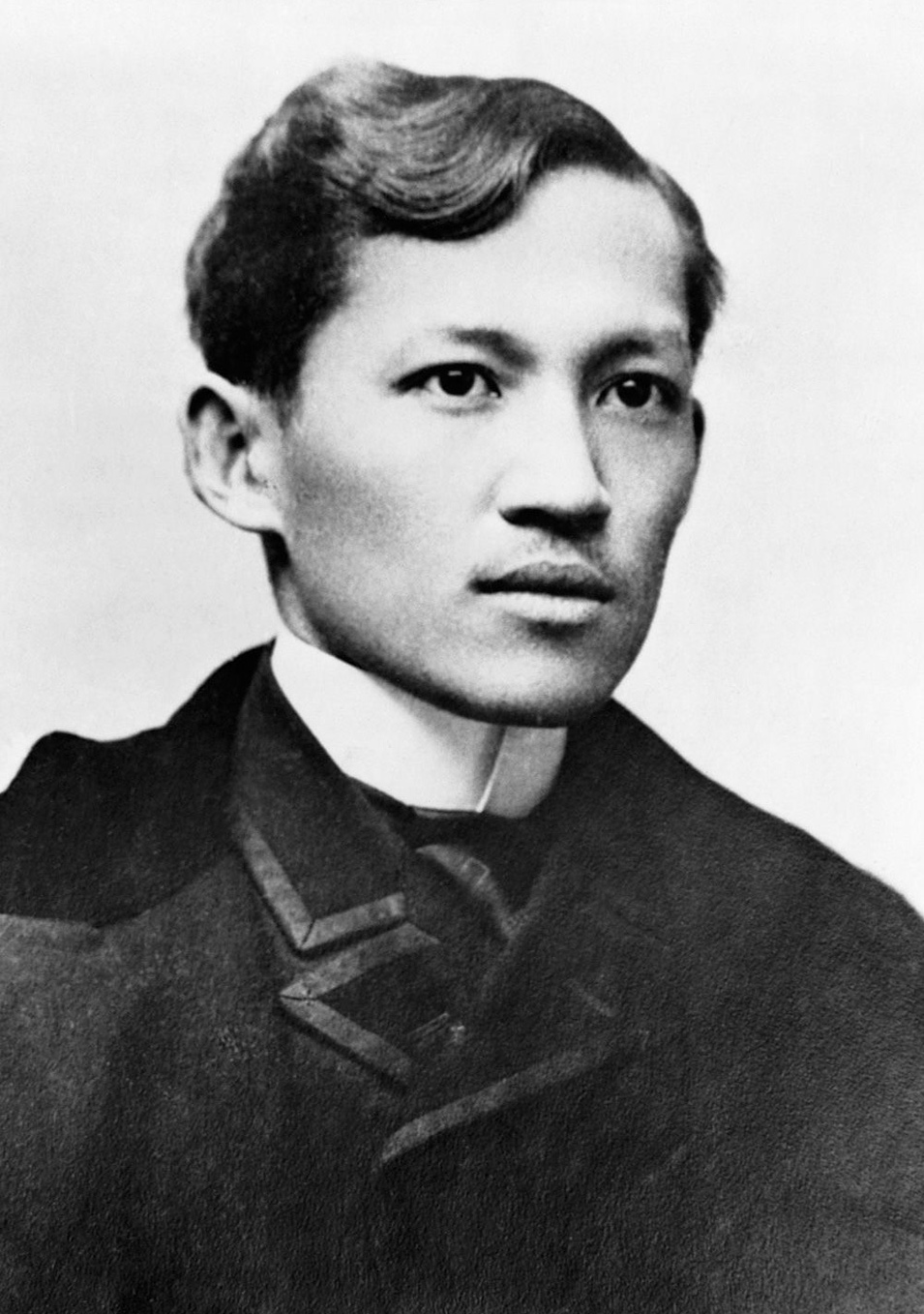
José Rizal

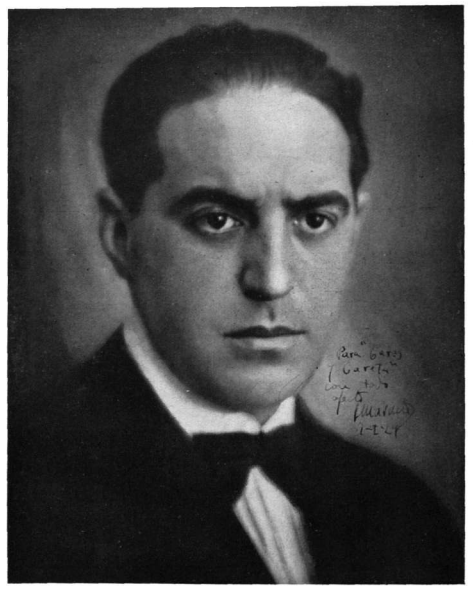
Gregorio Marañón

- Carlos Jiménez Díaz – medical pioneer
- Florestán Aguilar – medical pioneer
- Jimena Fernández de la Vega – physician and researcher
- Galo Leoz – ophthalmologist and supercentenarian
- Gregorio Marañón – Physician/Scientist/Historian/Writer/Philosopher
- José Protasio Rizal Mercado y Alonso Realonda – Philippine national hero, polyglot, writer, biologist, ophthalmologist, and author.
- Santiago Ramón y Cajal – Nobel Prize in Medicine (1906), founder of modern Neuroscience
- Javier de Felipe – neuroscientist
- Severo Ochoa – Nobel Prize in Medicine (1959)
- Elisa Soriano Fisher – physician, teacher, feminist
- Joaquín Gómez Mira – radiation oncologist and medical researcher
- Juan José López–Ibor – psychiatrist
- Simón Pardiñas – dentist, and youtuber

== Mathematics and sciences ==
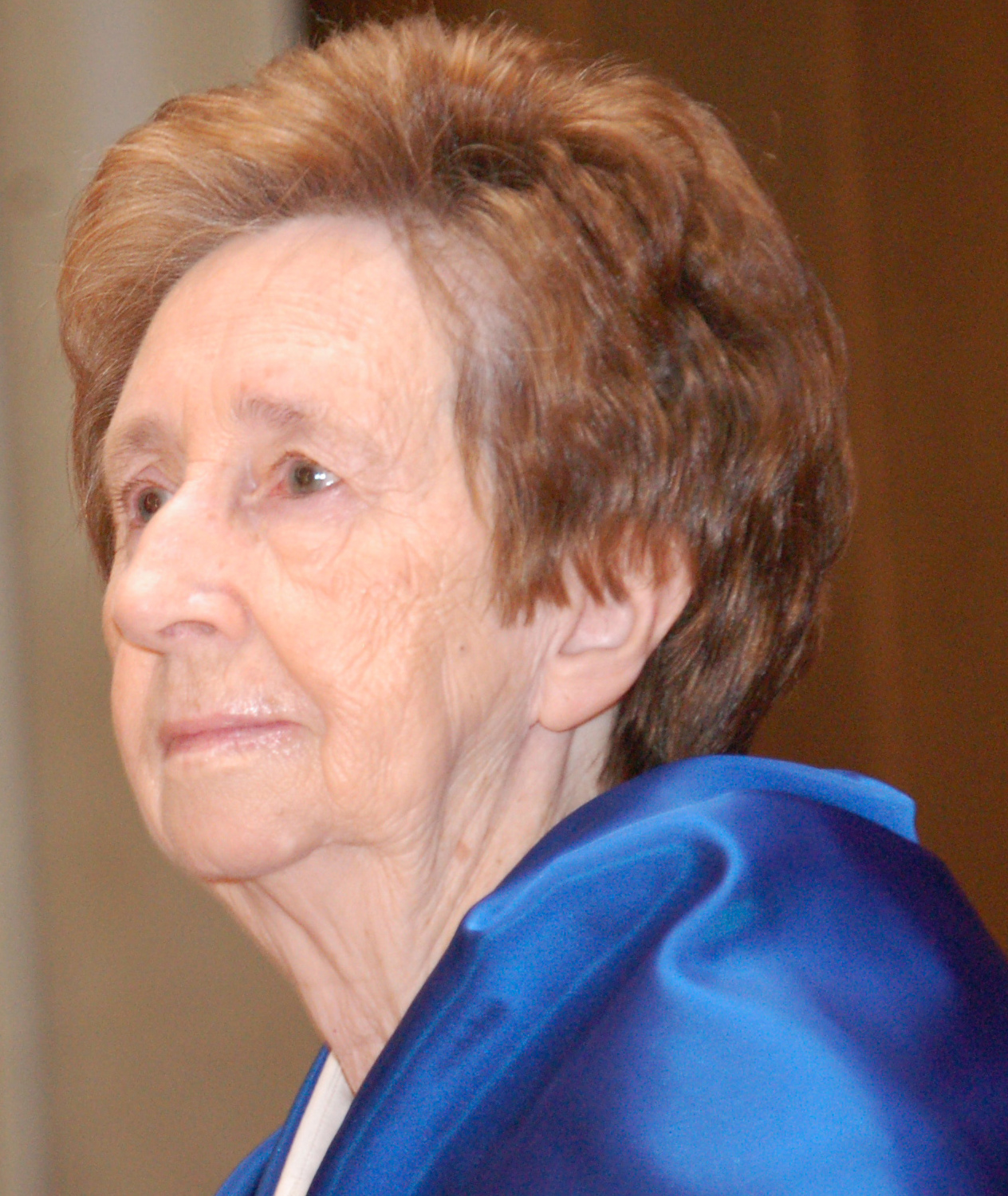
Margarita Salas

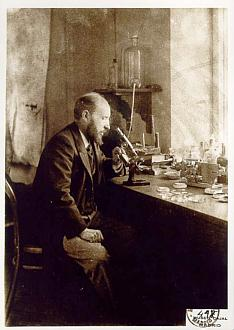
Santiago Ramón y Cajal

Severo Ochoa

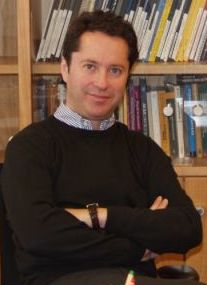
Juan Ignacio Cirac Sasturain

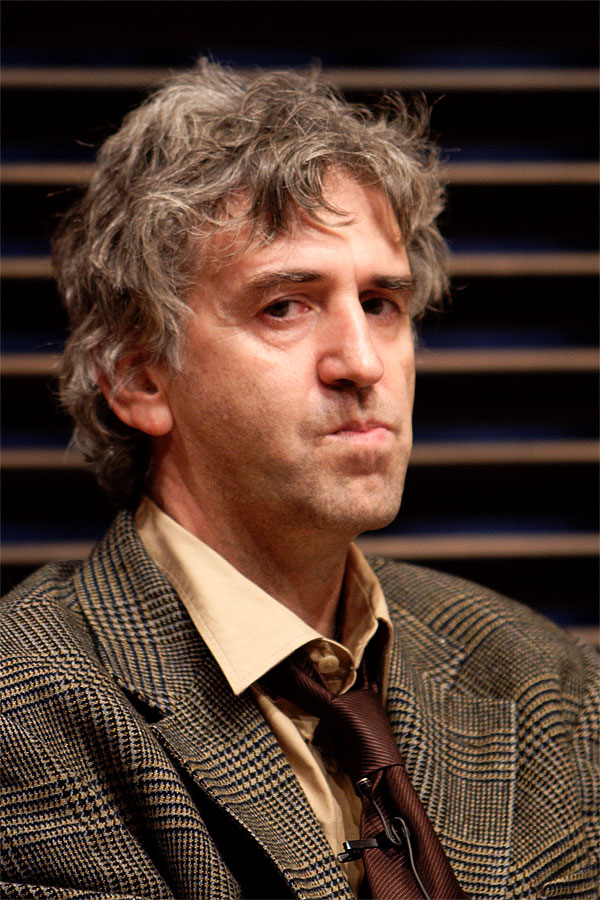
Juan Luis Arsuaga

- Albert Einstein – Doctor of Science degree Honoris Causa (first one he accepted from a European University)
- Alfredo Corell – immunologist, professor, and science communicator
- Antonia Ferrín Moreiras mathematician, professor, and the first Galician woman astronomer
- Ángel Martín Municio – chemist/pharmacist/President of the Spanish Royal Academy of Sciences
- Antonio Luna – Philippine General, Commanding General of the Philippine Revolutionary Army (Philippine–American War), Doctorate in Pharmacy (1890)
- Blas Cabrera y Felipe – physicist/President of the Spanish Royal Academy of Sciences, member of the Solvay Conference
- Bruno Brandão Fischer – Brazilian professor
- Carlos Sánchez del Río – physicist/President of the Spanish Royal Academy of Sciences
- Eduardo Torroja Caballé – mathematician, disciple of Karl Georg Christian von Staudt, member of the Spanish Royal Academy of Sciences
- Enrique Moles Ormella – physicist
- Federico Mayor Zaragoza – pharmacist/Director–General of UNESCO from 1987 to 1999
- Juan Manuel Rodríguez Parrondo – physicist
- Javier Fernández Aguado – Economics PhD, author and management expert
- Eva Barreno, Spanish botanist and lichenologist
- José Cuatrecasas – botanist
- José Rodríguez Carracido – chemist/pharmacist/Dean at the Faculty of Pharmacy/Rector of the Complutense University of Madrid /President of the Spanish Royal Academy of Sciences
- Juan Luis Arsuaga – biologist/paleontologist
- Julio Rey Pastor – mathematician
- Margarita Salas – scientist/President of the Instituto de España
- Miguel Catalán Sañudo – scientist
- Germán Sierra – theoretical physicist
- Myriam Gorospe – scientist
- Samer Hassan – computer scientist
- Sixto Ríos – mathematician/statistician
- Jesús Huerta de Soto – economist, law scholar
- Juan Ignacio Cirac Sasturain – quantum physicist, Wolf Prize in Physics 2013
- Vicente Lopez Ibor Mayor – solar energy
- Jimena Quirós – Oceanographer, scientist of the Spanish Institute for Oceanography (IEO).
- María Teresa Miras Portugal – Spanish scientist, pharmacist, biochemist, molecular biologist and Emeritus professor.
- Victoria Escandell-Vidal – theoretical linguist
- Zoe Rosinach Pedrol – pharmacist and the first Spanish woman to earn a doctorate in Pharmacy

== Film ==
- Alejandro Amenábar – Oscar–winning Filmmaker (did not graduate)
- Luis Buñuel – Surrealist Filmmaker
- Santiago Segura – Actor, Filmmaker

== Other ==
- Agustín Blánquez Fraile - latinist
- Ángel Sanz Briz – Spanish diplomat credited with saving thousands of Hungarian Jews from Nazi persecution during World War II
- Isabel de Ceballos–Escalera – museum director and curator
- Rosanna Castrillo Diaz – artist
- Chema Madoz – Photographer
- Vicente Blanco Gaspar, ambassador and writer
- Concepción Arenal – Spanish feminist writer and activist
- Emilio García Gómez – International authority on Arab culture
- Fernando Cordero Cueva – Ecuadorian politician and architect
- Hildegart Rodríguez Carballeira – Girl genius of the 1920s and renowned Socialist activist and Sexual Reformer
- Boti García Rodrigo – professor and LGBTI activist
- Cristina Lasvignes – radio and television broadcaster
- José Benedicto Luna Reyes – Filipino jurist
- José Antonio Llorente – Founder of Llorente & Cuenca
- Miguel Álvarez–Fernández – Sound artist and theorist
- Valentín García Yebra – philologist and translation scholar
- Fabio Hurtado – Artist
- Francisco Javier López Díaz – theologian
- Alejandra Andreu – Miss International 2008
- Luisa R. Seijo Maldonado – Activist, social worker and professor
- Eva Navarro – Artist
- Miren Ortubay Fuentes – Lawyer, criminologist, professor
- Gloria Oyarzabal – Visual artist
- Ronald Duterte – Filipino mayor
- Lucas Platero – Spanish educator and researcher
- Carlos Peralta – Swimmer and physician
- Cristina García Rodero – Spanish photographer
- Pablo Alfaro – Football manager and player
