= Huestis =

Huestis is a surname. Notable people with the surname include:

- David B. Huestis
- Josh Huestis (born 1991), American basketball player
- Marc Huestis (born 1954), American filmmaker
- Marilyn Huestis (born 1948), American toxicologist
- Stavert Huestis (born 1938), Canadian politician
