= David Huestis =

David Huestis may refer to:

- David B. Huestis, member of the board of the World Scout Foundation
- David L. Huestis, American physicist
