= Joaquín Gómez =

Joaquín Gómez may refer to:

- Joaquín Gómez Mira (born 1941), Spanish oncologist
- Joaquín Gómez (guerrilla) (born 1947), Colombian guerrilla leader
- Joaquín Gómez (rower) (born 1967), Mexican rower
- Joaquín Gómez (football manager) (born 1986), Spanish football coach
- Joaquín Gómez (athlete) (born 1996), Argentine hammer thrower
