= Eva Navarro =

Eva Navarro may refer to:

- Eva Navarro (painter) (born 1967), Spanish painter
- Eva Navarro (footballer) (born 2001), Spanish football forward
