= Myriam Gorospe =

Spanish scientist

Myriam Gorospe Sarasúa
- Born: San Sebastián, Spain
- Education: Complutense University of Madrid; University at Albany, SUNY

Myriam Gorospe (San Sebastián, Guipúzcoa, Spain) is a Spanish scientist, the head of the RNA Regulation Section at the National Institute on Aging (NIA) since 1998. Her group studies the influence of RNA in cellular processes related to aging.

== Biography and scientific career ==
She was born in San Sebastián, (Guipúzcoa, Basque Country, Spain). She moved to Madrid to study Biology in the Complutense University of Madrid and later to the United States for her doctoral studies at the State University of New York at Albany, which completed in 1993. She then joined the National Institute on Aging (NIA), became Principal Investigator of the RNA Regulation Section in 1998 and director of the Laboratory of Genetics and Genomics in 2014.

In 2009, she was elected as Women Scientist Advisor together with Francesca Bosetti, Cathy Wolkow and Marilyn Huestis. They developed “The NIA/NIDA WSA Awards” to recognize women scientists at their Institutes of Health for their scientific accomplishments.

In September 2013, she gave the conference L'Oréal-Unesco For Women in Science during the XXXVI Congress of the Spanish Society for Biochemistry and Molecular Biology (SEBBM).

She is part of the Editorial Board of the scientific journal Aging‑US.
