= Agustín Blánquez Fraile =

Spanish scholar

Agustín Blánquez Fraile (Valladolid, Spain 1883 – Barcelona, Spain, 1965) was a Spanish scholar, Latinist, historian and librarian.

He studied at the Central University of Madrid where he got a degree in philosophy and literature, a Ph.D. in philosophy and a law degree. He also carried out doctoral work on the Leonese dialect, publishing his dissertation "Límites del dialecto leonés" in 1907. In 1911, he studied to become a member of the Faculty of Archivists, Librarians and Archeologists. He served in Palencia, Valencia, and then in Barcelona where he was appointed Head of Archives, Libraries and Museums; and also Head of Restoration Services in Girona. In this city, he reinstated the Museo de San Pedro de Galligants, and directed the Ampurias Museum.

In 1943, he was appointed director of the University Library of Barcelona, where he organised numerous exhibitions such as "El Libro Impreso en Barcelona", the "Centenario de los Reyes Católicos", "Libros de Mística", "Estampas y Grabados". In 1945, he began the publication of the catalogs of the Library with the Incunables de la Biblioteca Universitaria.

Blánquez became a professor of the School of Librarians of the University of Barcelona where he taught Latin language and literature until 1962. He was also honorary Professor of Philosophy and Literature at the University of Barcelona. He was temporary director of the Archive of the Audiencia Territorial of Barcelona.

He is the author of the Diccionario Latino - Español (Latin-Spanish dictionary, 1946), his best work, published by Editorial Sopena until 1997. His Spanish-Latin dictionary was published posthumously in 1966.

In October 2012, Editorial Gredos launched a new edition of the two volumes of the Latin-Spanish dictionary in one single 1.744 pages volume.

== Works ==
- Diccionario Latino Español (1946-1966, 1997)
- Diccionario Español - Latino (1966)
- Diccionario Manual Latino-Español y Español-Latino (1958, 1965, 1984)
- Geografía Universal (1931, 1936, 1942)
- Geografía de España (1934, 1943)
- Elementos de Gramática Latina (1936, 1943)
- Límites del dialecto leonés occidental en Alcañices, Puebla de Sanabria y La Bañeza, JUNTA PARA AMPLIACIÓN DE ESTUDIOS É INVESTIGACIONES CIENTÍFICAS: Memoria correspondiente al año 1907. Madrid: Hijos de M. Tello, Apéndice 1 (p 67-78)
- Historia de España (1931, 1936)
- Discursos Políticos y Forenses, Cicerón, traducción, prólogo y notas (Iberia 1958)
- Dramas y Tragedias de Sófocles (Edipo Rey, Edipo en Colona, Antígona, Electra, Las traquinias, Filoctetes, Ayax) (Iberia 1955)
- Los diez libros de arquitectura, Marco Vitrubio Polión, traducción, prólogo y notas (Iberia, 1985)
- Historia de la guerra del Peloponeso, Tucídides, traducción, prólogo y notas (Iberia 1963)
- Los deberes, Cicerón, prólogo, traducción y notas (Iberia, 1946)
- Los Ocho libros de la medicina, Aurelio Cornelio Celso, traducción, prólogo y notas (Iberia, 1966)
- Teatro Completo II, Miguel de Cervantes (Iberia, 1966)
- Teatro Completo de Séneca (Medea, Las Troyanas, Las Fenicias, Hércules Enloquecido, Edipo, Agamenon Tieste, Hércules en el monte Eta), Octavia, traducción, prólogo y notas (Iberia 1958)
