= Gloria Oyarzabal =

Spanish visual artist

Gloria Oyarzabal (born 1971) is a Spanish visual artist and teacher who works in photography and cinema. She was the co-founder of the Independent Cinema “La Enana Marrón” (The Brown Dwarf) in Madrid (1999–2009), a theater that showcased films d'auteur and "experimental and alternative cinema." She is the winner of several international photography awards and prizes.

== Early life ==
Oyarzabal was born in London. She has a Bachelor of Fine Arts from the Complutense University Madrid and a Master’s degree from the Blank Paper School of Photography, Madrid. Oyarzabal lived in Mali for three years, researching "the ideal of Africa that Europe has created for its own benefit".

== Career ==
In 2016, Oyarzabal created a "docu-fiction" photography collection centred on Sir John Everett Millais's Ophelia, which was featured in The Huffington Post. She views Ophelia as the ultimate symbol of women's oppression. Speaking about her work in this series Oyarzabal said "I feel satisfied if I can convey this idea of oppression, anxiety, and the breathlessness of some women".

In 2017, Oyarzabal won the Landskrona Foto Dummy Award for her project The Picnolepsy of Tshombé. After being displayed at the Landskrona Foto Festival, the newly renamed Picnos Tshombé photobook went on to be presented and published in Arles, gaining international recognition.

in September 2018, Oyarzabal's work has been featured in the Vevey open-air photography festival, in Switzerland . This work, Pink Girl, Woman go no'gree, was also re-produced in The Guardian in 2019. Oyarzabal's work focuses on the Yoruba people, looking into evidence showing that their original society was not gendered. Her project Woman go no'gree questions the application of notions of gender in western feminism to different cultures which function differently.

In 2020, Oyarzabal was Highly Commended for the Bartur Photo Award in the COVID-19 Reflections series.

In 2020, Oyarzabal was the winner of aperture PhotoBook of the Year for Woman go no'gree. The book explores colonialism and white feminism through the use of found images and archives from West Africa and her own photographs. Farah Maakel writes in The Art Momentum, "She worked from the perspective of an artist and not an academic, nor an anthropologist, nor a writer, and her position as a white European woman here is the keystone of her work. In fact, instead of daring to use the voice of the so-called Other, she uses her voice as a translation of her own gaze onto the other – especially the western construction of the concept of women." A review in the photography magazine Conscientious states, "The viewer is made to look at women living in Africa in a variety of ways, and the overall feeling is one of self-determination: these women neither need colonial administrators to tell them what to do nor contemporary men from their own or any other culture."

== Works ==
- Woman go no'gree, RM/Vevey Images, 2021. ISBN 978-84-17975-28-9

== Awards ==
- 2017 Landskrona Foto Dummy Award
- 2018 Encontros da Imagem Discovery Award
- 2019 Images Vevey Dummy Award
- 2019 PHOTO IS:RAEL Meitar Award for Excellence in Photography
- 2019 Grand Prix Fotofestiwal
- 2020 aperture Portfolio Prize Runner-Up
- 2020 aperture PhotoBook of the Year
