= Mercedes Gallego =

Spanish journalist and author (born 1970)

- Born: July 4, 1970 (age 56); Sabadell (Barcelona)
- Education: Complutense University of Madrid
- Occupations: Journalist, Author
- Website: www.mercedesgallego.com/eng/

Mercedes Gallego (born July 4, 1970) is a Spanish journalist and author who specializes in foreign policy and the coverage of conflicts, wars, and natural disasters. She has served as a foreign correspondent for various Spanish newspapers since 1994. In 2003 she was the only Spanish female journalist who covered the invasion of Iraq as an embedded journalist among the US troops. Her experience as a female reporter in Iraq was captured in her non-fiction book Más allá de la batalla: una corresponsal de guerra en Irak (Beyond the Battle: A War Correspondent in Iraq), which uncovered the sexual abuses that she witnessed within the military. She also coauthored the award-winning documentary Rape in the Ranks: the Enemy Within with Belgian reporter Pascal Bourgaux in 2009. Currently she is the US Bureau Chief for Vocento Media Group and is a frequent guest of Channel NY1 Noticias as a political commentator on the show “Pura Política”.

== Early life and education ==
Mercedes Gallego was born in Sabadell (Barcelona) and raised in Jerez de la Frontera (Cádiz), Spain. She completed a BA degree in journalism from the Complutense University of Madrid in 1994.

== Career ==
Gallego started her career in Madrid as a reporter for musical magazines and community radio stations. In 1991 she worked in the US for the first time as a reporter for Tiempo Latino, a Hispanic daily newspaper in San Francisco, California.

After completing her degree in journalism she moved to Mexico, where she worked for several Mexican and Spanish television channels and newspapers, including Canal 22, Telecinco, Reforma, El País and El Correo. She arrived in Mexico in 1994, year of the Zapatista uprising in Chiapas, the political murders that tormented the country, and the devaluation of the peso triggering the Tequila Crisis throughout Latin America. From 1994–1999 she also covered the guerrillas in Guatemala, the political transition in Nicaragua, the devastation caused by hurricane Mitch in Honduras, and Che Guevara's funeral in Cuba, among other events of international relevance.

During the Kosovo bombing in 1999, Gallego was reassigned to New York City as US Bureau Chief for Vocento Media Group. She witnessed the September 11 attacks in 2001, the invasion of Iraq in 2003, Hurricane Katrina in 2005, the 2010 earthquake in Haiti, and Hurricane Sandy in 2012, aside from every US election since 2000.

Gallego covered the 2003 invasion of Iraq as an embedded journalist. She was one of the five international journalists attached to the headquarters battalion of the US First Marine Division. The other four were representing The New York Times, Los Angeles Times and NPR radio. One of the fruits of this experience is her non-fiction book Más allá de la batalla: una corresponsal de guerra en Irak (Beyond the Battle: A War Correspondent in Iraq), which she dedicated to her best friend and fallen colleague Julio Anguita Parrado. It is a raw, first person narrative of the war that exposes sexual abuses within the military, four months before the US Congress required the Pentagon to conduct an official investigation. Gallego’s story was also featured in the book Embedded by Bill Katovsky and Timothy Carlson (2004). For this work she has received awards from Intereconomía Radio, El País, the Messengers of Peace Association and a special mention from the Miguel Gil Foundation. In 2009 she coauthored the documentary Rape in the Ranks: The Enemy Within for France2 Télévision with Belgian reporter Pascale Bourgaux. The 30-minute-film received the Bronze Remi Award at the 2009 Annual World Fest Houston International Film Festival and in 2010 the Best Investigative Documentary at the New York International Independent Film and Video Festival.

Gallego has given numerous lectures in Spanish as well as American universities. She has also shared the stage with Tim Robbins for a discussion of his play Embedded in New York City and is frequently invited to comment on US politics in panels and international TV shows. She has been interviewed by NBC Telemundo, Telemadrid, Telecinco, Antena 3, CNN+, ABC, El Periódico de Catalunya, El Nuevo Herald and her work has been reviewed and cited by many.

Currently, she works in New York as the US Bureau Chief of the 13 syndicated newspapers of the Vocento Media Group, which reaches over 5 million readers in Spain, and is a frequent guest of Channel NY1 Noticias as a political commentator on the show Pura Política.

== Awards ==
Mercedes Gallego has been the recipient of several prestigious awards. In 2003 she received the prize for Best Journalist of the Year by Intereconomía Radio and shared a special Ortega y Gasset Award from El País with other notable correspondents of the Iraq War. In 2004 she was a recipient of the Pluma de la Paz ("Pen of Peace") presented by the Messengers of Peace Association. In 2007 she received a Special Mention of the Jury of the VI Miguel Gil Journalism Awards. Rape in the Ranks: The Enemy Within, the film she coauthored with Pascal Bourgaux, received the Bronze Remi Award at the 2009 Annual World Fest Houston International Film Festival and in 2010 the Best Investigative Documentary at the New York International Independent Film and Video Festival.

== Bibliography ==
Aside from her daily contributions to newspapers, blogs and other media, Mercedes Gallego has written a book and a documentary about her observations during the Iraq War and sexual abuses in the military in general:

- Gallego, Mercedes. Más allá de la batalla: Una corresponsal de guerra en Irak. Madrid: Temas De Hoy, 2003. Print.
- Rape in the Ranks: The Enemy Within. Directed by Pascal Bourgaux; Screenplay by Pascal Bourgaux and Mercedes Gallego. France2, 2009. Film.

She has also collaborated with other authors in the publication of books on the subject:

- Albertini, Stefano, Carlos Fresneda, and Ana Alonso. Julio Anguita Parrado: Batalla sin medalla. Madrid, España: Foca, 2004. Print.
- Katovsky, Bill and Timothy Carlson. Embedded: The Media at War in Iraq. Guilford, CT: Lyons, 2003. Print.
- Ericson, Patrick and Juan Ramón Galvez. Anochece en Irak. Madrid, España: Guadalturia, 2010. Print.
