= Zoe Rosinach Pedrol =

Spanish pharmacist (1894–1973)

- Born: 6 February 1894; Lleida
- Died: 31 January 1973 (aged 78); Zaragoza
- Education: Central University of Madrid
- Occupations: Pharmacist, microbiologist
- Spouse: Pedro Baringo
- Children: 2

Zoe Rosinach Pedrol (6 February 1894 – 31 January 1973) was a Catalan pharmacist and the first Spanish woman to earn a doctorate in pharmacy. She also participated in feminist activities and opened a branch of the National Association of Spanish Women in Barcelona with her sister.

== Biography ==
Zoe Rosinach was born in Lérida, Spain (spelled Lleida in Catalan), into the family of Pablo Rosinach, an itinerant dentist from Juneda, and Carmen Pedrol, a midwife. She had three siblings: Carmen, Carmelo and Paz (spelled Pau in Catalan).

After completing her studies at the General and Technical Institute of Lleida, Rosinach enrolled in Pharmacy at the University of Barcelona in the 1913–1914 academic year. This was a time when women needed special permits issued by the King of Spain to attend universities, making their presence there extraordinary (women were not allowed to freely attend universities until 1910). Accommodations were made for the three women in her class, which was mostly made up of young men. The women were required to sit apart from their male classmates, and they were escorted home by a professor to protect their integrity. Her studies went well until one professor denied her the opportunity to complete her work in Barcelona. Frustrated, she transferred to the Central University of Madrid where she graduated in pharmacy in 1917.

After a year as a researcher at the Alfonso XIII National Institute of Hygiene, she defended her doctoral thesis in the Department of Microbiology at the Central University of Madrid on 17 June 1920, becoming the first Spanish woman to earn a doctorate in pharmacy. Her thesis was supervised by Dr. Antonio Ruiz Falcó, who worked in the epidemiology section of that Institute; it was "unanimously approved with the highest distinction." Spanish King Alfonso XIII even congratulated her, calling her "the new doctor," at a luncheon organized by the Royal Household in honor of that year's graduates.

=== Career ===
Zoe's life took a turn when, on one of her trips to Madrid, she met the physician Pedro Baringo, whom she married in 1921 after a brief courtship. They moved to Albalate del Arzobispo, where her husband practiced medicine. In 1930, Zoe Rosinach registered with the College of Pharmacists of Teruel, and two years later she was able to open her own pharmacy in Albalate.

In 1936, the family moved to Zaragoza seeking safety after surviving an assassination attempt on her husband because Pablo Rosinach was considered a right-winger. However, upon arriving in the city, he was accused of being a leftist and was arrested. Even after his release, he remained under suspicion. These were difficult years for the couple. That same year, Zoe Rosinach attempted to register with the Zaragoza College of Pharmacists but received no response until 1937, authorizing her to open a pharmacy in the city in 1938. Her pharmacy was located at Calle Cortes de Aragón, No. 1, until 1941, when it moved to Calle Hernán Cortés, No. 34, She ran it until 1973, when she died.

As a pharmacist, she prided herself on making her own compounded preparations requested by her customers.

The couple had two sons. The eldest, Joaquín, continued running his mother's pharmacy until 1983, when it was sold. The second, Pedro, became a lawyer and eventually became president of the Provincial Council of Zaragoza.

Zoe Rosinach Pedrol died in Zaragoza on 31 January 1973.

=== Feminist activities ===
Zoe Rosinach participated in the early Spanish feminist movements and in 1920 she was appointed the first secretary of the Feminist University Youth of Madrid, an association chaired by Clara Campoamor. It is worth noting that it was founded under the auspices of the "National Association of Spanish Women," which originated in 1918, thus becoming the first Spanish organization to defend women's rights. Zoe later founded a branch in Barcelona together with her sister Pau.
