= Victoria Escandell-Vidal =

Linguist

María Victoria Escandell Vidal is a professor of linguistics at the Complutense University of Madrid known for her research in semantics, pragmatics and their interfaces.

== Education and career ==
Escandell-Vidal studied at the Complutense University of Madrid, receiving her first degree in 1983 and her doctorate in 1989. During her studies she held teaching positions at the University of Alcalá and the Spanish National University of Distance Education. Upon the award of her doctorate she took up a position as senior lecturer at the latter, carrying out research visits to the Ca' Foscari University of Venice (1991) and Lund University (1996). In 2007 she was promoted to full professor of linguistics at the National University of Distance Education, and in 2020 she returned to the Complutense University of Madrid as full professor.

== Honours and awards ==
Escandell-Vidal has been the recipient of numerous honours and awards. In 1996 she received an award for foreign female researchers from the Humanistisk Samhällsvetenskapliga Forskningsrådet of Sweden, one of the bodies which would later merge to become the Swedish Research Council. In 2013–14 she was the holder of the Emile Lorand chair of Spanish linguistics at the Vrije Universiteit Brussel. In 2022 she was elected ordinary member of the Academia Europaea.

== Research ==
Escandell-Vidal works on pragmatics, semantics, prosody, and the syntax-semantics-pragmatics interfaces. She has investigated topics in information structure, verbal tense–aspect–mood, evidentiality, politeness theory, language processing, and second-language learning, among others, with a primary empirical focus on the Romance languages Spanish, Catalan and Italian.

== Selected publications ==
- Escandell-Vidal, Victoria. 1996. Towards a cognitive approach to politeness. Language Sciences 18, 629–650. doi:10.1016/S0388-0001(96)00039-3
- Escandell-Vidal, Victoria. 1998. Politeness: A relevant issue for relevance theory. Revista alicantina de estudios ingleses 11, 45–57. doi:10.14198/raei.1998.11.05
- Escandell-Vidal, Victoria, and Manuel Leonetti. 2002. Coercion and the stage/individual distinction. In Javier Gutiérrez-Rexach (ed.), From words to discourse, 159–179. Leiden: Brill. doi:10.1163/9780585475295_011
- Escandell-Vidal, Victoria. 2006. Introducción a la pragmática (Introduction to pragmatics). Madrid: Grupo Planeta. ISBN 9788434409514
- Leonetti, Manuel, and Victoria Escandell-Vidal. 2009. Fronting and verum focus in Spanish. In Daniel Jacob and Andreas Dufter (eds.), Focus and background in Romance languages, 155–204. Amsterdam: John Benjamins. doi:10.1075/slcs.112.07leo
