= David B. Huestis =

Canadian scouting leader

- Known for: Member of the Board of the World Scout Foundation

David B. Huestis of Canada served as a member of the Board of the World Scout Foundation. In 2011, Huestis was awarded the 330th Bronze Wolf, the only distinction of the World Organization of the Scout Movement, awarded by the World Scout Committee for exceptional services to world Scouting.
