= Marilyn Huestis =

American toxicologist

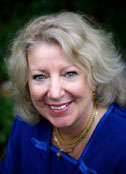
- Huestis in 2014
- Born: 1948 (age 77–78)
- Education: University of Maryland School of Medicine (PhD)
- Scientific career
- Fields: Toxicology
- Workplaces: National Institute on Drug Abuse
- Thesis: An integrated pharmacokinetic and pharmacodynamic study of acute marijuana use (1992)

Marilyn Ann Huestis (born 1948) is an American toxicologist researching the effects of illicit drugs on the body, brain, and in utero. She was chief of the chemistry and drug metabolism section at the National Institute on Drug Abuse.

== Early life and education ==
Huestis began working in a toxicology lab in 1969 as an undergraduate at a women's college. She married during her senior year, held a variety of jobs and raised a family. Ten years later, Huestis went through a two-year program to earn a M.S. in clinical chemistry. In 1988, Huestis started at the National Institute on Drug Abuse (NIDA) as a research fellow while completing her Ph.D. in toxicology in 1992 from the University of Maryland School of Medicine. Her doctoral research focused on cannabis. Her dissertation was titled An integrated pharmacokinetic and pharmacodynamic study of acute marijuana use. She was over the age of 40 before she started conducting research.

== Career and research ==
Huestis is a toxicologist who studied the effects of illicit drugs on the body, brain, and in utero. After receiving her doctorate in 1992, she founded her own company. In the late 1990s, Huestis started one of the few human clinical research labs in the world to test illicit drugs in humans. In 1998, she became chief of the chemistry and drug metabolism section of the NIDA. She retired in 2016 after 23 years at NIDA. Huestis was an adjunct professor at the University of Maryland School of Medicine.

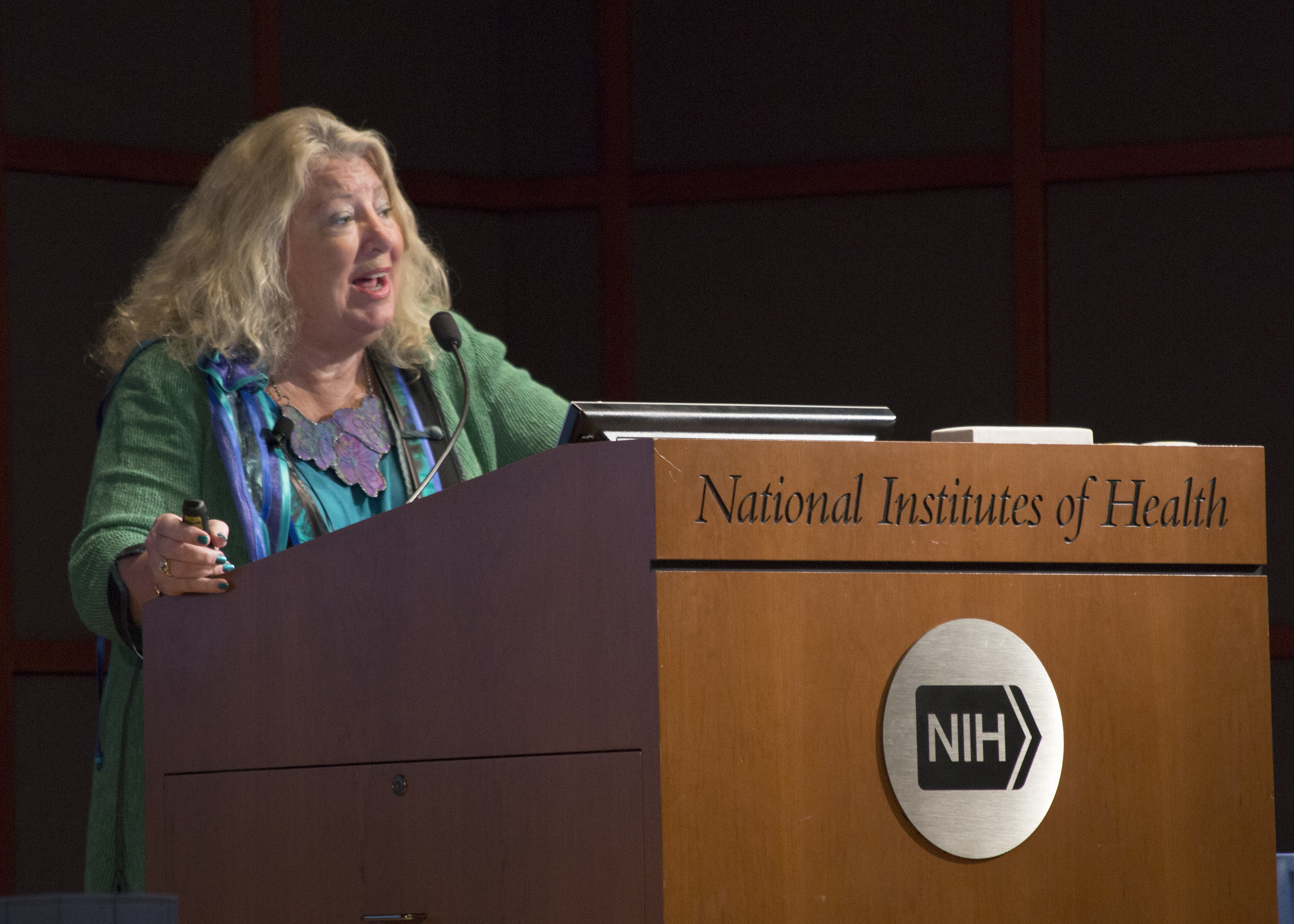
Huestis in 2016 presenting her research in Bethesda, Maryland.

Huestis' research program had sought to discover mechanisms of action of cannabinoid agonists and antagonists, effects of in utero drug exposure, and the neurobiology and pharmacokinetics of novel psychoactive substances, the emerging face of drug abuse. She studied a wide range of illicit drugs, including cocaine, methamphetamine, ecstasy, and heroin. Her research included an initiative to develop new diagnostic tests for designer drugs, which current drug tests cannot detect. Huestis' work has yielded more than 400 manuscripts, most recently with a focus on the effects of marijuana use on driving impairment. She was motivated to see how her research improved people’s lives by reducing deaths from drugged driving or reducing the effects on children when mothers use drugs during pregnancy.

Huestis was a president of the Society of Forensic Toxicologists, chair of the Toxicology Section of the American Academy of Forensic Sciences, and the first woman president of The International Association of Forensic Toxicologists.

== Awards and honors ==
In 2010, Huestis received a doctor honoris causa from the Faculty of Medicine at the University of Helsinki, a school that supported her work on in utero drug exposure.
