= Eva Navarro (painter) =

Spanish painter

- Born: Eva Navarro Quijano; 7 September 1967 (age 58); Madrid, Spain
- Education: Universidad Complutense Madrid
- Known for: Painting
- Movement: Spanish New Figurative Art

Eva Navarro (born 1967) is a Spanish painter living in Madrid, Spain. She has a bachelor's degree in Fine Arts from the Universidad Complutense de Madrid. Her work is considered part of the Spanish New Figurative Art Movement. She mostly exhibits her work in Europe and the United States.

== Work ==
Navarro's work has been described as "vivacious, uncomplicated and energetic, as well as being full of extraordinary colour". Basic elements such as movement, space, action and time, all expressed through the human figure, are reflected in her work. The Boston Globe has written that "she explores the concept of time, with long shadows lingering across paintings".

The characters that Navarro uses for her paintings are people that have crossed paths with her in different locations around the world. They stand in seas of exceptional color and are painted with a sharp realism. The characters are also washed in sun, casting shadows across the canvas. Their faces are tucked or hidden away from the viewer, creating a very deliberate emotional distance. "She photographs people on the streets, then isolates them against bold monochromatic backdrops. We rarely see their faces, though we may see the same figure again, moving forward, casting vivid shadows. They could be anyone; they could be you, and that tension between identity and anonymity is compelling.

Eva Navarro was selected as 2015 Residence Artists at the Sam and Adele Golden Foundation for the Arts in New Berlin, NY.

Navarro’s recent work has been considered livelier, as she introduces more colors, evoking a more optimistic and playful tone for some viewers.

In April 2016 Eva Navarro was the First Prize Winner of the VKR75 International Painting Competition, organized in Denmark, with her painting “Enlightenment”. Troels Rasmussen, VKR Holding company historian, states: “The winner of first prize, Eva Navarro from Spain, has worked masterfully with light, shade and sensuality. The viewer is brought close to a person sitting in a chair, reading in subdued, yet bright, lighting from above. The scene is credible and convincing, with exquisite technical detail, all of which combine to make this work the clear winner of the competition”.
