= Joaquín Gómez Mira =

Spanish oncologist

Joaquín Gómez Mira (born 26 April 1941) is a scientist and physician specialized in radiation oncology. Born and raised in Spain, he completed his studies and developed his career in the United States, where he moved in 1967. He is a member of the American Society of Clinical Oncology, and a Fellow and appointed councilor of the American College of Radiology. His work, achievements and lectures in the field of radiation oncology are held in high regard.

== Biography ==
Joaquín Mira was born in Madrid on 26 April 1941. He is the son of Joaquín Gómez Mira, an industrial engineer, and Juana Garcia Gobantes, a teacher.

He completed the Bachillerato in the Colegio del Pilar de Madrid from 1946 to 1958. He was part of a successful class that included a number of distinguished alumni. (Note: Among this group of students were the politician and minister Rafael Arias-Salgado, the ambassador Javier Rupérez, and the businessman and art collector Juan Abelló.)

While attending secondary school, he felt a special attraction for the subject of biology, and had access to books on surgery and medicine in the home of a friend whose father was a doctor. After this first contact with the subject, he had the opportunity to witness live surgeries from the observation seats for students in the operation theater. The dissection classes he attended as an observer were another convenient place to expand his knowledge before embarking on a medical career.

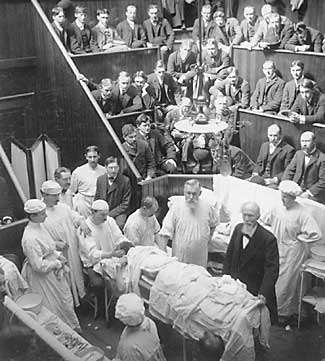
Theater for clinical teaching (1901)

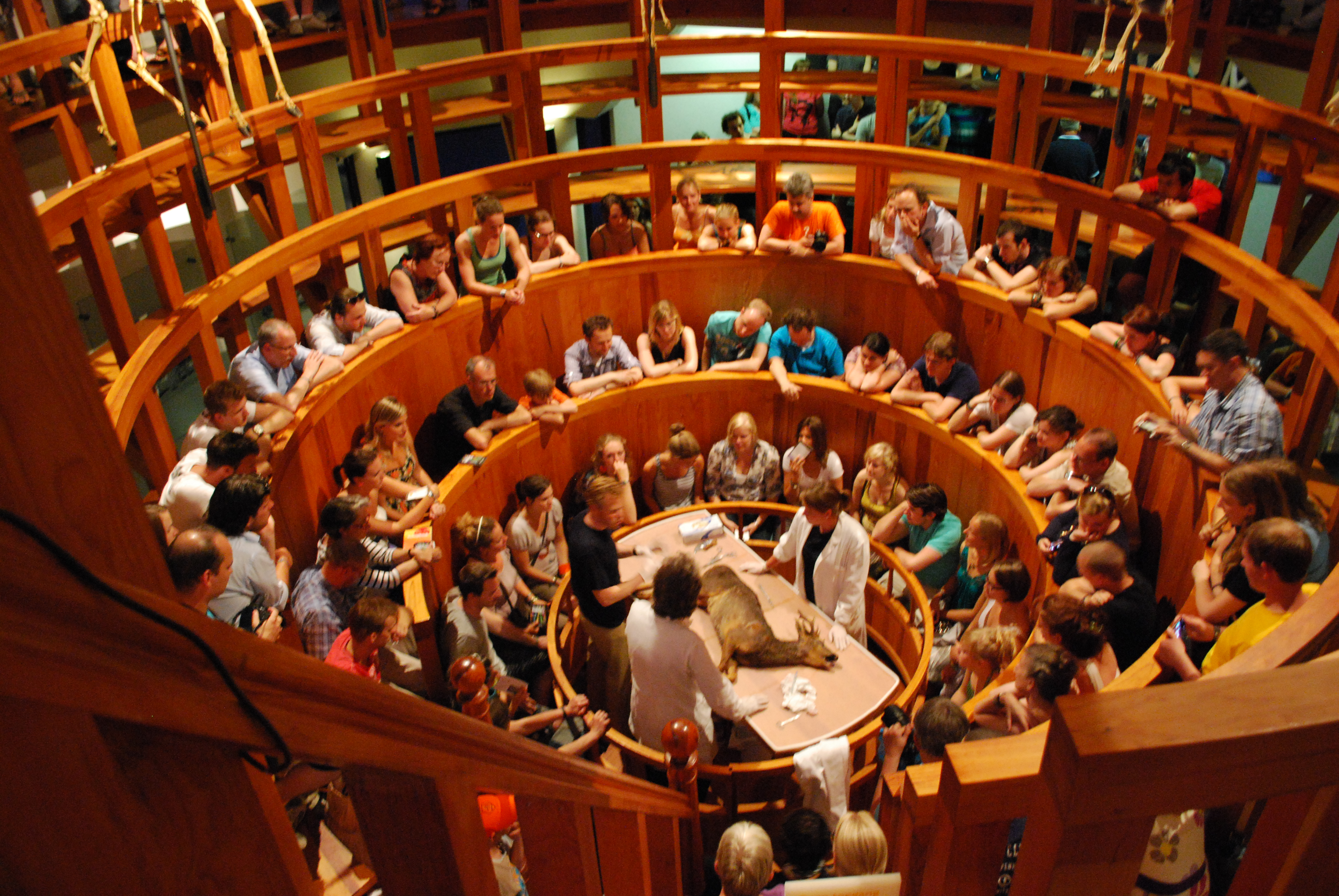
Lesson of anatomy and dissection in 2010. Museum Boerhaave.

He completed his undergraduate studies at the Complutense University of Madrid School of Medicine, where he obtained a bachelor's degree in 1965. From October of that year to June 1967 he completed an internship at the Clínica de la Concepción, Carlos Jiménez Díaz Foundation, under the supervision of Jiménez Díaz himself, and specialized in Internal Medicine. During this time he passed the required examinations to obtained his American Medical Degree ( M.D.), allowing him to be able to continue his training in the United States.

In July 1967 he arrived in Seattle (United States) to continue his medical training by doing a one-year rotating internship at the Providence Hospital, under the direction of Dr. Paul E. Hardy. This step was essential to advance his career. He went on to a residency on radiotherapy in Colorado with Dr.Juan del Regato and completed a Fellowship at the Memorial Cancer Hospital in New York under the direction of Dr. Giulio D' Angio.

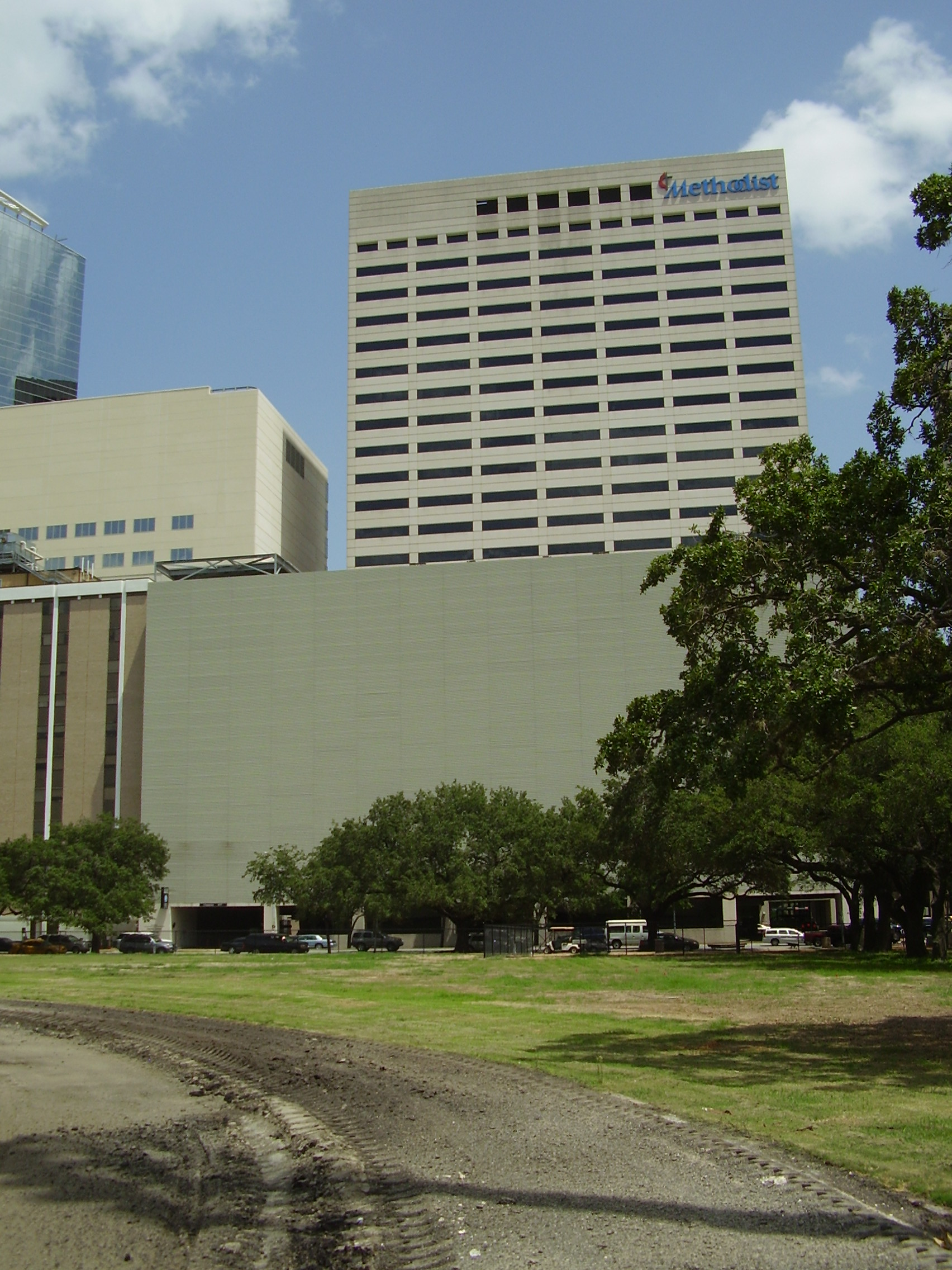
Houston Medical Center

He started his professional career at the Houston Methodist Hospital, part of the Texas Medical Center, where he worked for two years. In 1975 he moved to San Antonio, becoming the interim Head of Radiotherapy at the University of Texas in that town. During the period between 1973 and 1983 he also carried out academic research and published scientific articles in several peer-reviewed journals. He was named Director of Radiotherapy in the Cancer Therapy & Research Center, under the National Cancer Institute, where he led a team of professionals that achieved optimal results within the field.

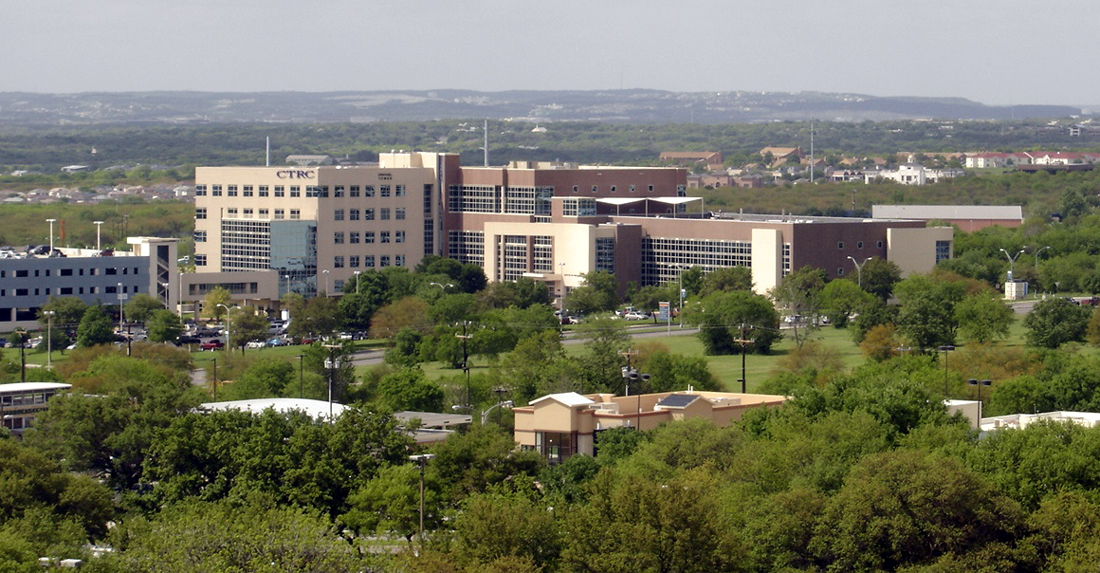
Cancer Therapy & Research Center

For 21 years, up to 1999, he successfully renewed an annual fellowship of the National Institutes of Health to be a principal investigator in the field of radiotherapy in one of the world's largest oncology groups, the SWOG the Southwest Oncology Group) with seat in San Antonio. He was the responsible for the treatment of the radiotherapy patients in protocols at that town, as well as the recruitment of qualified personnel.

He pioneered the use in Texas of a robotic tool for radiosurgery, Cyberknife. In the last stage of his professional career, since 2005, he focused on his private practice in the South Texas Oncology Hematology Group (STOH) and South Texas Accelerated Research Therapeutics (START),

== Publications ==
Joaquín Gómez Mira has authored about 74 publications in journals and books, and over 150 presentations in national and international meetings and invited talks. which include the following:.

- Mira, J.G., Chu, F.C. and Fortner, J.G.: Radiotherapy for Malignant Hemangiopericytoma: Reported Eleven Cases and Review of Literature. Cancer, 39:1254-1259, 1977.
- Mira, J.G., and Livingston, R.B.: Evaluation and Radiotherapy Implications of Chest Relapse Patterns in Small Cell Lung Carcinoma Treated With Radiotherapy-Chemotherapy: Study of 34 Cases and Review of the Literature. Cancer, 46:2557-2565, 1980.
- Mira, J.G., Livingston, R.B. and Moore, T.M.l: Influencing of Radiotherapy in Frequency and Patterns of Chest Relapse in Disseminated Small Cell Lung Carcinoma. Cancer, 50(7):1266-1272.
- Mira, J.G., Livingston, R.B. and Moore, T.N.: Influence of Chest Radiotherapy in Frequency and Patterns of Chest Radiotherapy in Frequency and Cell Lung Carcinoma. The Yearbook of Cancer 1984, Editor Roberta Medelson, Yearbook Medical Publishers, Inc., Chicago, Illinois.
- Mira, J.G., Chen, T.T., Livingston, R.B. and Wilson, H.E.:: Outcome of Prophylactic Cranial Irradiation and Therapeutic Cranial Irradiation in Disseminated Small Cell Lung Carcinoma: A Southwest Oncology Group Study. International Journal Radiation Oncology, 14(5):861-865, May, 1988.
- Mira, J.G., Elson, D.L., Taylor, S. and Osborne, C.K.: Simultaneous Chemotherapy-Radiotherapy With Prophylactic Cranial Irradiation for Inoperable Adeno and Large Cell Lung Carcinoma: A Southwest Oncology Group Study. International Journal of Radiation Oncology, 15(3):757-761, September, 1988.

=== Monographs ===
- Mira, J.G.: Description of Radiotherapy Procedures. In CRC Handbook of Medical Physics, Volume II. Waggener, R.G., Kereiakes, J.G. and Shalek, R.J. (editors), CRC Press Inc., Boca Raton, Florida, p. 165-214, 1984.
- McCracken, J.D. and Mira, J.G.: Concurrent Chemotherapy and Radiation Therapy for Limited Small Cell Lung Cancer. Monograph, Bristol-Myers, Syracuse, New York, 1986.
- Mira, J.G.: Combined Modality Treatment for Small Cell Lung Cancer. Chapter in Combined Chemotherapy and Radiotherapy in Clinical Oncology. By Professor A. Hordwich. Edward Arnold Publishers, Kent, England, 1991.

=== Radio and television broadcasts ===
- 1978 Breast Cancer Awareness Week – KWEX Television, San Antonio, Texas
- 1979 Breast Cancer Awareness Week – KWEX Television, San Antonio, Texas
- 1980 Cancer of the Breast Interview – KWEX Television, San Antonio, Texas
- 1990 Brachytherapy – KSAT Television, San Antonio, Texas
- 1991 Early Diagnosis of Cancer – KSAT Televisión, San Antonio, Texas.
- 2001 New Technology in Radiation Therapy – KWEX Television, San Antonio, Texas
- 2001 Doc Talk – In Several Texas Television Stations
- 2003 New Radiation Technology – KWEX Television, San Antonio, Texas
- 2004 New Medical Technologies – Despierta América, Univision Televisión, San Antonio, Texas
- 2005 Cyberknife Radiosurgery – KENS Television, San Antonio, Texas
- 2009 Radisosurgery, new radiation technology--- Univision Televisison
