= Women in the Spanish democratic transition period =

Women in the Spanish democratic transition period (1975–1982) were able to legally organise as feminist groups. The adultery law was repealed in 1978. Abortion was not legalized during the transition, but was in some circumstances shortly afterwards in 1985.

== 1970s in transition ==
During Spanish elections in the transition period, women favored centrist political parties and disavowed more the extremist elements like ETA, Herri Batasuna (HB), Catalan nationalists ERC, and Galician radicals.

In the transition period, HOAC, JEC, Comisiones Obreras and UGT were largely focused on the creation of a new Spanish democracy. While female only labor associations had existed underground in the Francoist period, these organizations and the specific needs of women they espoused were largely ignored by HOAC, JEC, Comisiones Obreras and UGT.

== Women's rights ==
=== Abortion ===
Because abortion was illegal in Spain, during the 1970s, Spanish women who could afford it went to London to get abortions. Between 1974 and 1988, 195,993 Spanish women traveled to England and Wales to get an abortion. Women also went to the Netherlands in this period to have abortions. France was not an option, as at the time it required women who had abortions to be French residents and have resided in the country for at least three months. Women then needed to wait a week to reflect before they could get an abortion. An unknown number of women went to North Africa and Portugal for abortions. During the mid-1970s, the Catholic Church preached that no physical barrier should be present during sex, and that even post-coital washes were problematic as they interfered with the primary goal of sex being conception. The Catholic Church taught the only acceptable reproductive control methods were abstinence and the rhythm method. The Church tried to interfere in any efforts to change this. In the 1970s and 1980s, feminists were the only major group demanding the government address women's needs to have access to abortion services. They played a critical role in changing public perception around abortion.

Total abortions among Spanish women that took place in Spain, England and Wales, and the Netherlands
1974-1995	Spain		England and Wales		The Netherlands		Total		ref
Years	Number of abortions	Rate per 1000 reproductive aged women	Number	Rate	Number	Rate	Number	Rate	ref
1975	-	-	4393	0.59	-	-	4393	0.59	
1976	-	-	6397	0.85	-	-	6397	0.85	
1977	-	-	10,187	1.35	-	-	10,187	135	
1978	-	-	14,015	1.85	-	-	14,015	1.85	
1979	-	-	17,061	2.23	-	-	17,061	2.23	
1980	-	-	18342	238	2,000	0.26	20342	2.64	
1981	-	-	20,454	2.65	4,000	0.52	24,454	3.17	
1982	-	-	21,415	2.75	4300	0.55	25,715	3.31	
1983	-	-	22,002	2.8	5,800	0.74	27,802	3.55	
1984	-	-	20,060	2.54	7,300	0.93	27360	3.47	
1985	-	-	17,688	2.22	6,344	0.8	24,032	3.02	
1986	-	-	11,935	1.44	4,581	0.55	16,516	1.99	
1987	16,766	1.99	5,878	0.7	2,524	0.3	25,168	2.99	
1988	26,069	3.07	3,188	37	1,406	0.17	30,663	3.61	
1989	30,552	3.56	1,332	0.15	572	0.07	32,456	3.77	
1990	37,231	4.3	886	0.1	313	0.04	38,430	4.43	

=== Adultery ===
In the immediate post-Franco era, feminists in Spain were united in their goal to eliminate the law that made adultery a criminal offense. Their efforts were joined by many anonymous women and some men. They found support in their goals from progressive political parties.

=== Childcare ===
Childcare was an aspect of women's rights taken up during the democratic transition period. Starting in 1975, state policy switched to offering more opportunities for children to be enrolled in free state-run educational preschool programs. These classes were for children aged three to five, the three years before the state mandated age to start attending school of six years old. The childcare programs that the government focused on had two distinct features. One was that programs for 4 and 5-year-olds be educational. Many of these programs were run through the Ministry of Education and Culture. There were few comparable programs for children three and under. Second was that private childcare facilities had to be approved and regulated by the government. This, unlike other western countries, included attempts to regulate private daycare run by people from their homes. None of these programs were focused on the needs of working parents. This was because of a widespread belief that mothers made the best caregivers of their children.

Despite increased feminist interests in childcare as a component of women's rights in the democratic period, feminists were not consistent in their demands and were unable to mobilize around the issue. Feminist groups, feminists inside state institutions and women's sections of Spanish unions differed from their European peers in that they infrequently drove needs for a wide range of childcare services to be offered by the state and have not acted as primary supporters of the needs of mothers. When they were working as actors in this area, it was generally on behalf of children and focused on the education needs of children under the age of six. Major complaints have involved the lack of government run educational opportunities for children in this age group.

Spanish feminists may have been hesitant to address the issue of motherhood and the needs of mothers for a few reasons. The first is the period of the dictatorship did not allow for the creation of detailed feminist thinking in a Spanish specific context. This development of a feminist ideology would only take place during the transition, as feminist developed specific goals that they would like to see enacted in a new democratic Spain. Second, much of the feminist thinking at the time was inspired by reading the philosophies of feminists from other countries. International feminists in the mid-1970s were largely unconcerned with the concept of motherhood or the care of minor children. Consequently, this did not peculate through internationally influenced Spanish feminist thought. Lastly, Spain was in a dictatorship, where definitions of male and female sexuality were rigidly imposed by the state. Goals in responding specifically to the end of the dictatorship were often around achieving political equality, and less so about specific economic issues of women. At the same time, not discussing motherhood was viewed by some as rejecting the dictatorship's definition of womanhood that exclusively defined women in that way.

Some parties on the right like Alianza Popular (now Partido Popular) were open to talking about educational opportunities for young children but were reticent to discuss childcare as a result of their own beliefs in traditional Spanish motherhood, where women were not allowed to participate in the labor market. Centrist parties were also hesitant to discuss the issue, lest they lose their broad base of support. Union of the Democratic Center (UCD) made no reference to childcare in their 1977 electoral campaign materials. PSOE supported educational programs for children under 6 in their campaign materials, but these were largely part of their program to try to reduce class inequality through education; this was not out of concern for childcare needs of working mothers.

=== Contraception ===
At the time of Franco's death in November 1975, almost all the laws related to female sexuality were still intact, including prohibitions on the use of contraceptives. During the mid-1970s, the Catholic Church preached that no physical barrier should be present during sex, and that even post-coital washes were problematic as they interfered with the primary goal of sex being conception. The Catholic Church taught the only acceptable reproductive control methods were abstinence and the rhythm method.

=== Divorce ===
Divorce in the late Franco period and early transition period was available via ecclesiastical tribunals. These courts could nullify marriage for a fee. Consequently, they were mostly only available to the rich, with the most famous types of this nullification involving Isabel Preysler and Carmencita Martínez Bordiú. The Civil Courts would only be involved in separation procedures at the provisional level. The Catholic Church was actively opposed to civil divorce in the mid and late 1970s.

== By year ==
=== 1975 ===
To avoid bloodshed following the death of Franco on 20 November 1975, left leaning parties like PSOE and PCE agreed to the "pact of silence" which largely involved not discussing or seeking to prosecute atrocities committed by the Franco regime during its time in power, or by either side during the Spanish Civil War.Partido Feminista de España was founded in 1975 by Lidia Falcón, constituted in 1979 in Barcelona and registered in 1981.

Palmira Pla Pechovierto returned from Venezuelan exile in the late 1970s. The teacher immediately became involved with PSOE in Castellón, and went on to represent the area in the 1977 Constitutional Legislature of Spain.

Franco's death in 1975 allowed women to emerge publicly, no longer needing to remain clandestine. It led to the mass organization of feminist organizations.

A May 1975 law meant public schools could now legally teach the Basque language. This instruction had to be optional and take place at the end of regular school hours. The principal had full discretion as to whether or not such classes would be offered. This law was not backed by government funding to pay teachers, nor train them. October 1975 saw another important law impacting the Basque language come into effect. This law acknowledge regional languages as important in Spain and that there was a need to preserve them. At the same time, it re-stated that despite this, these regional languages could not be used in official government business, courts or legislative assemblies.

=== 1976 ===
Feminists largely rejected the 15 December 1976 Political Reform Referendum. In general, they did not believe the Francoists were capable of enacting reforms that would benefit women.

Inmaculada Benito and María Ángeles Muñoz were two of the last women in Spain to be tried for adultery, only escaping prison when the adultery law was repealed in 1978. Their cases were brought in mid-1976. At the time, Benito was a 21-year-old medical student from Zaragoza while Muñoz was a 30-year-old domestic worker living in Barcelona. Both had dependent children and both had separated from their husbands. In December 1976, two women accused of adultery in Lugo and Pontevedra. The woman from Lugo was acquitted but the woman in Pontevedra was ordered to serve a six-month prison penalty and pay a fine of 100 pesetas. Their cases started after the cases of Benito and Muñoz.

As a European Christian Democratic party, UCD opposed the legalization of divorce and abortion, believing in what they saw as "the preservation of the family." At the same time, PSOE and UCD supported its legalization. Most of the independents in 1976-1977 were right wing, with the primary exception of Suárez who supported the legalization of divorce.

In the a four-month period in 1976, 2,726 Spanish women went to London for abortions.

The first organization created about women's reproductive health and birth control was opened in Madrid in 1976 by Federico Rubio. Asociación de Mujeres de Aluche was one of the earlier women's reproductive health and birth control centers, creating in the first years after the end of the dictatorship.

In 1976, Aureliano Lobo died and María Bruguera Pérez threw herself into organizing the Health Committee of CNT.

Women in PSOE and UGT in 1976

After Franco's death, María Begoña Abdelkader García was part of a group that created PSC-PSOE AS in Hospitalet (Barcelona). When the UGT was still semi-clandestine in 1976, Ludivina García Arias was elected at XXX UGT Congress in Madrid in April as UGT Secretary of Emigration of the Executive Commission. Carmen García Bloise attended the same congress, representing the Section of Grenoble (Isère). In 1976, Carmen Muriana joined UGT. At the December 1976 XXVII PSOE Congress in Madrid, Carmen García Bloise was elected secretary of Administration of the Executive Commission. Ana María Ruiz-Tagle became involved in feminist groups and trying to address women's rights starting in 1976 during the transition. She would go on to be a Spanish Senator representing PSOE in 1982, 1986 and 1989.

Women in PNV in 1976

PNV met clandestinely in a Franciscan convent in the final days of the regime. Following Franco's death, they would not have their own headquarters were in 1976 after a builder donated a house for the party to use in Bilbao. Garbiñe Urresti returned from exile in Venezuela and ran a clandestine Basque language radio station. She helped prepare programs and helped prepare information for air. She also was an on air personality.

=== 1977 ===
While the pill was still illegal in 1977, 8 million were sold in Spain. Adolfo Suarez said of legalization of contraception in 1977 "We must provide legal coverage and transparency to what is normal and usual at the street level." In 1977, Juan Luis Cebrián was charged with disclosing information about contraceptive use in an article he wrote in the newspaper Sunday Times as part of a series by British doctors. He was facing the possibility of 200,000 pesetas (GBP£1,670) fine and six months in prison. In the article, he mentioned that contraceptive use was widespread in Spain, with one million women using some form on a regular basis. Some forms were sold publicly, in pharmacies with government approval. The Suarez government sent the Cortes Generales a bill to decriminalize contraceptives on 15 December 1977.

Sección Feminana was formally dissolved in 1977, two years after the death of Franco.

Following the death of Franco in 1975 and the amnesty of 1977, many of ETA's female activists returned to the Basque region. A hardcore group though would remain outside in places like France and Latin America for many years. These activists outside the country espouse the radical philosophy that until they were their own nation, the Basque people were a people without a home.

Women in UGT in 1977

Carmen Romero became UGT's Executive Education Committee Press Secretary. Because of an amnesty, Carmen Muriana got her job at Standard back. Carmen Romero became UGT's Executive Education Committee Press Secretary. Josefina Arrillaga would briefly rejoin PSOE during the transition period.

==== Spanish general elections of 1977 ====
Ahead of the 15 June 1977 general elections, political and social conditions largely remained unchanged. Leftist parties did not necessarily accept demands of most feminists accept for certain issues like the legalization of conception. Many feminists involved in political groups abandoned specific goals in favor of broader political goals, resulting in a diluted form of feminism being adapted by major leftist parties.

PCE was legalized on 9 April 1977. Its legalization was viewed at the time as an important required step in Spain's democratic transition. The decision by Adolfo Suarez to legalize the party was sped up as a result of PCE's actions following the 24 January 1977 murders of seven labor lawyers in Atocha. Ahead of the 1977 elections, PCE announced it was "the party of the liberation of women".

Ahead of the first democratic elections in 1977 following the death of Franco in 1955, Spaniards overwhelming were supportive of the legalizing of divorce. Ahead of the 1977 elections, UCD did not put forth a coherent party policy on major social issues of the day in order to try to broaden their appeal among Spanish voters, who had largely been apolitical as a result of regime constraints on political activity. Their primary goal in the 1977 elections was to create a rupture with the past and the dictatorship via reform. The Cortes of 1977 had to try to find a way to navigate the demands of the newly liberated left, who wanted to see reforms like the legalization of abortion and divorce, with the Catholic Church who opposed both. The last time the state had been in conflict with the Church was in 1931, with the founding of the Second Republic and no one wanted to see renewed political violence.

The transition period saw Unión de Centro Democrático (UCD) come into power led in 1977 by Prime Minister Adolfo Suarez on a liberal platform espousing women's rights. Because his party lacked an absolute majority to govern, he was forced to form a coalition with other more right leaning parties. This resulted in a dilution of women's priorities and angered many women's rights advocates and feminists, serving to splinter these groups along ideological priority based grounds that saw one side view participation in the constitutional draft process as being part of emancipated citizenship while another faction saw it as oppressed women being forced to participate in their own repression. Radical feminists opposed to UCD felt vindicated in their doubts following the 1979 general elections, which saw 21 women or 6 percent of the 350 seats belonging to women, down from 22 in the previous congress. At the same time, UCD continued to be the largest political organization for women with the most representation of any party in Congress, with 11 women deputies and 4 women senators. In contrast, PSOE refused to address women's issues more broadly and to prioritize women's concerns. They did not move women's positions up their list, and consequently the number of female PSOE representatives fell in 1979 to 6 from the previous high of 11. One of the reasons UCD went into decline after the 1977 elections was the party was forced to take positions on major issues of the day, including divorce, abortion and the use of public money for private schools.

=== 1978 ===
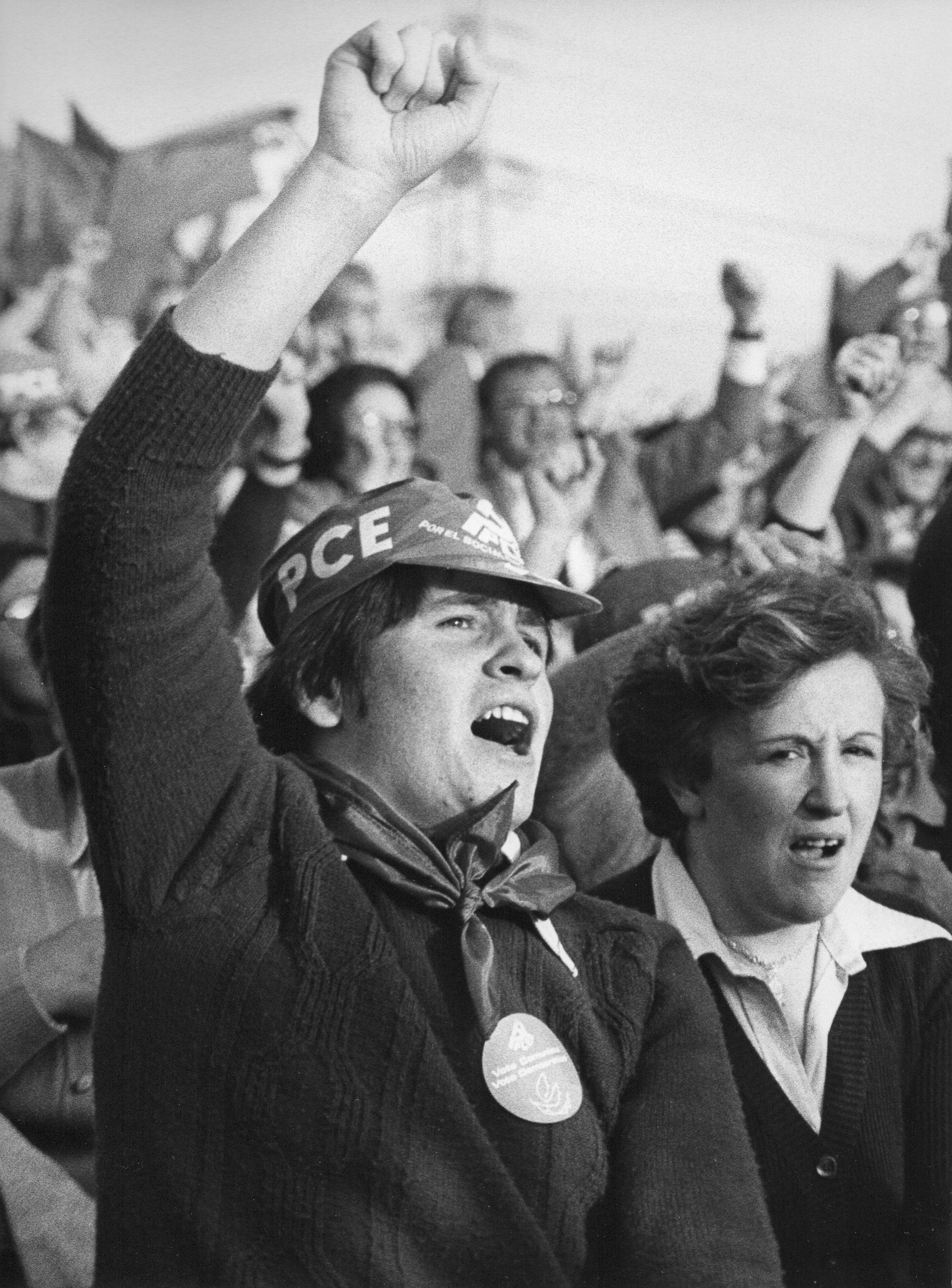
The first party of PCE in Spain's democratic transition period celebrated in Casa de Campo in 1977.

Feminist associations were legally allowed starting in 1978, a year after PCE began a legal political party.

Compulsory following of Catholic canonical law as a legal definition in Francoist Spain and the democratic transition did not end in Spain until the 1978 Spanish constitution.

The Primeras Jornadas de la Mujer were held in the Basque Country from 8–11 December 1978. The Primeras Jornadas de la Mujer were held in Granada in 1979. At both, the issue of dual militancy was discussed by women trade unionists and political party members in attendance. For many of these women, even though they were able to work, their husbands often demanded they do traditional women's housework and childcare because the husband said his unionist and political activities were more important than hers. This left many women feeling insecure in their activism.

Carmen Conde became the first won to become a member of the Real Academia Española, ascending to her position in February 1978.

In UGT elections in 1978, Carmen Muriana was elected to the Comité de Empresa, and would go on to hold many more leadership positions in UGT.

On 26 May 1978, adultery was eliminated as a criminal offense in Spain's penal code. This took place as a result of the repeal of Articles 449 and 452 of the Penal Code. The Justice Committee of the Congress of Deputies did this by unanimous consent. Definitions of abandonment were also changed, as they were not consistent for both sexes with women previously only being able to claim abandonment if her husband forced his wife to support his mistress while they were living in the same house. On 7 October 1978, the law was changed to decriminalize the sale of contraceptives, along with information on how to use them. The Senate bill that passed to decriminalize adultery was different than the one passed by Congress. Consequently, for the first time the Joint Congress-Senate Committee had to meet to reconcile these differences. The primary issue was whether adultery could be used as a reason to disinherit someone, with Congress saying it could not be used while the Senate version said it could be used. In the end, the version put forth by Congress became the final version. National Federation of Progressive Women President Yolanda Besteiro de la Fuente said of the rescinding of this law, "It meant overcoming a historical discrimination of women, who could be punished with six years in prison if they committed adultery, faced with the impunity of this same behavior if committed by a man. It consecrated the freedom of women in their sexual relations and produced an authentic social transformation changing the traditional concept of marriage and, therefore, of the family."

==== 1978 contraception decriminalization ====
1978 was the year that contraception became a driving issue among Spanish feminists. Their goal going into the year was to see contraception decriminalized by year end.

By April 1978, the issue of decriminalizing contraception was being debated in the Spanish Cortes, a new national legislative body with only 21 women. Communist María Dolores Calvet pointed out during the debate that contraception legalization was one of the issues agreed upon as part of the Moncloa Pacts. This discussion took place around the same time that the decriminalization of abortion also took place, with division along ideological lines. UCD could agree with PSOE to pass legislation to avoid procreation but not over the issue of terminating a pregnancy. UCD got support from the right to ban the sale of contraceptives that were "harmful to the health". PSOE rallied the left, managing to prevent by a single vote, the ability for the government to make decrees that would limit contraceptive advertising. This was largely a result of abstentions from UCD. Socialist Vicente Sotillo pointed out in the debate that UCD's efforts to decriminalize contraceptives while at the same time criminalizing the sale of contraceptives harmful to health was incoherent. Catalan Communist José Solé Barberá compared the government's lack of willingness to fully decriminalize contraceptives as akin to the policies of Hitler, Stalin and Franco. Communists and socialists were successful in seeing their measures come into law. By a vote of 140 to 141, contraceptive issuance was legalized but had limits on the ability to advertise them.

The Cortes Generales formally decriminalized the sale, use and disclosure of information about contraceptives on 7 October 1978. It became the first time in the history of Spain that a woman's sexuality was separated from procreation. The law gave women control over the number of children they wanted to have, when they wanted to have children, and if they wanted to have children while single or married. This would later prove pivotal in a Spanish context as it came to other rights for women that had previously centered around procreation and sexuality.

Despite the legalization of contraception in 1978, voluntary sterilization remained a crime in Spain, with doctors punishable by prison time for performing such procedures. At the same time that contraception was decriminalized, the government announced it would create 74 centers for the orientation of families to attend to married couples. Spanish gynecologists were upset about the word orientation, seeing it as paternalistic and inappropriate. Many also refused to ask women using these clinics for their family books that showed proof of marriage.

In 1978, sales of the pill would exceed 10 million units.

==== Spanish Constitution of 1978 ====
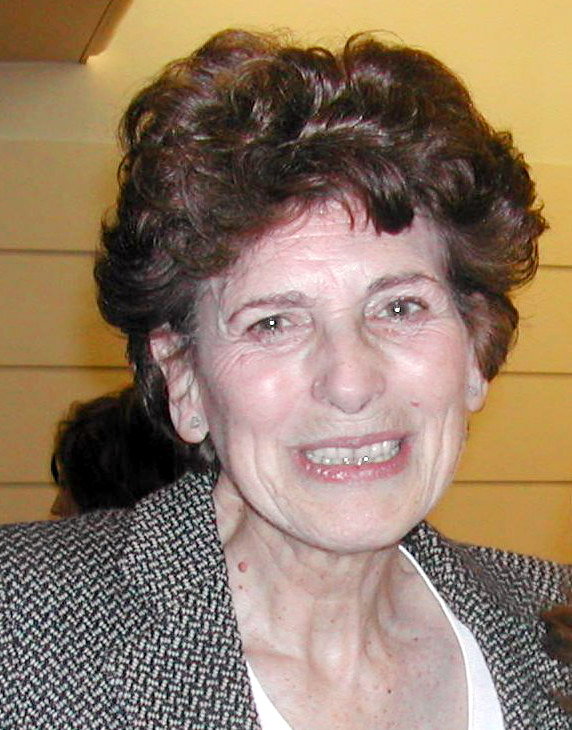
Teresa Revilla in January 2006.

Following Franco's death, Spain underwent massive change that culminated in the Constitution of 1978. This document returned Spain to being a country where women were guaranteed full equal rights under the law. Reforms in the post-Francoist period saw the Catholic Church lose official status in government, the age of legal majority moved from 21 to 18, and marriage defining men and women equally. Under Article 14 of the 1978 Spanish Constitution, all people were considered equal before the law. It prohibited the state from discriminating based on birth, sex, religion or political opinion. Article 9.2 states, "It is the responsibility of public powers to promote conditions ensuring that the freedom and equality of individuals and of the groups to which they belong are real and effective."

In the Constituent Assembly that drafted the 1978 Spanish constitution, only 27 members were women. The final drawing up of the Spanish constitution had no women involved in the process. The only woman involved in the 39 member commission that debated the constitutional process was UGT's María Teresa Revilla. Revilla said of the process, "The Constitution was a fundamental and decisive leap for women in Spain. From there, the inequalities in the laws began to be corrected. The woman really began to be able to be what she herself achieved with her effort (...) I believe that none of the deputies of that constituent legislature were satisfied with the regulation of the Crown in regard to the order of succession. How was it then possible to discriminate against women in flagrant contradiction with what was said in article 14 of the Constitution itself? Even today I can not find sufficient reason ."

The Cortes of 1977 had to try to find a way to navigate the demands of the newly liberated left, who wanted to see reforms like the legalization of abortion and divorce, with the Catholic Church who opposed both. The last time the state had been in conflict with the Church was in 1931, with the founding of the Second Republic and no one wanted to see renewed political violence.

On 22 May 1978, four UCD deputies and four Socialist deputies met at a restaurant in Madrid to try to find a compromise on major issues as they related to how they were addressed in the constitution. These issues included divorce and abortion. The UCD deputies went into the meeting having consulted their PCE and Catalan counterparts and gotten their approval for these talks. All agreed this was a necessary step to avoid a breakdown in the process of writing a new constitution. Allianza Popular was left out of these discussions. One of the reasons UCD went into decline after the 1977 elections was the party was forced to take positions on major issues of the day, including divorce, abortion and the use of public money for private schools.

In the first draft of the constitution, both PSOE and PCE supported the legalization of abortion and divorce. UCD supported the legalization of divorce, but at a later date. UCD opposed the legalization of abortion. Coalición Popular opposed both the legalization of abortion and divorce. A compromise was reached on divorce that would see the issue addressed in later legislation through the text of Article 32.2 which said, "the law will regulate the forms of matrimony... [and] the causes of separation and dissolution." No agreement could be reached over abortion, and Article 15 had the ambiguous text "todos tienan derecho a la vida" at the insistence of UCD and Coalición Popular so the door could be left open to make abortion illegal.

Feminist groups watched the process of creating a new Spanish constitution with concern. On 6 December 1978, a number of groups presented Cortes president Antonio Hernández Gil with a list of their concerns about it. Signatories included women who were members of UCD, PSOE, PC, MDM, ADM-PT and ORT-ULM. They wanted the constitution to commit the government to incorporating women into the workforce, that marriage should be based on equality of spouses, that marriages could be dissolved by mutual consent of either spouse, that every women should have the right to decide how many children she would have, and that women should have access to birth control. These women were opposed to Article 15, which said that "everyone has the right to life" (Spanish: todos tienen derecho a la vida) as they felt it could be interpreted as offering protection to fetuses. Their fears would be realized on 11 April 1985, when this constitutional wording was used to declare an abortion law illegal.

The Basque Nationalist Party objected to the new Spanish constitution of 1978 on the grounds it was a Spanish constitution.

=== 1979 ===
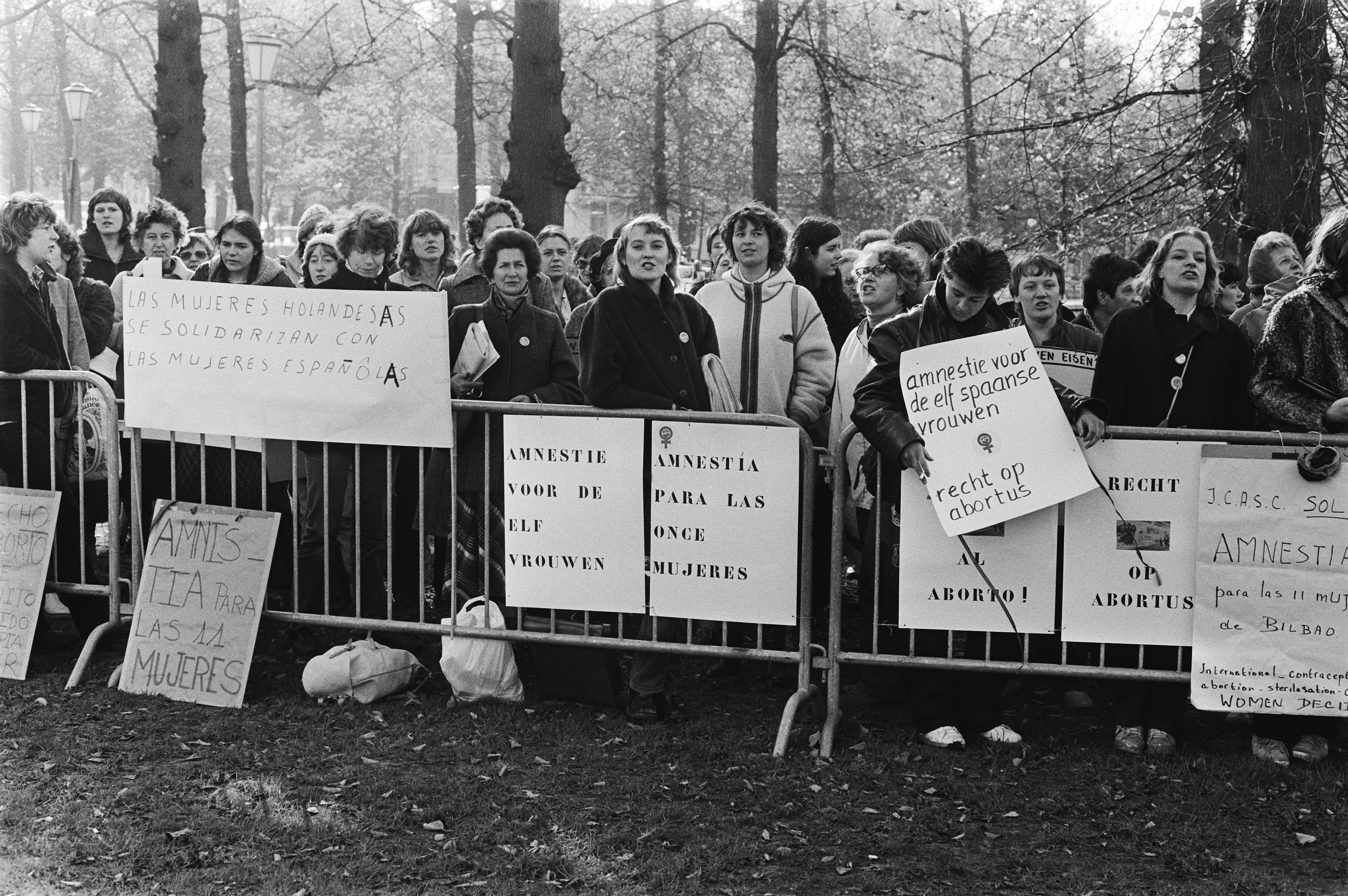
Dutch women in The Hague in 1979 demanding amnesty for the Bilbao women.

In 1979, 16,433 Spanish women had abortions in London. 1979 was a pivotal year for abortion rights with the Bilbao Trial (Spanish: Juicio de Bilbao). The trial involved ten women and one man who were prosecuted for performing abortions. Prosecutors announced their intention to seek prison time of more than 100 years. With the original trial announced on 26 October 1979, it was not held until 1982 as a result of being suspended several times in the interim. The trial absolved nine of the women involved. A man who induced the abortions and a woman who performed them were found guilty. The ruling was appealed, with the appeal being suspended several times before being heard at the end of 1983. The results of the appeal resulted in four women being acquitted, and six women and the man were given prison sentences. In the end, those seven would eventually be pardoned by the state.

The November 1979 XXXII Conferencia Episcopal said the Church did not want to interfere in the ability of legislators to do their job. Nonetheless, they advised that legislators considering legalization of divorce be allowed only in specific circumstances. This included that divorce was not a right, mutual consent not be allowed, and that divorce should only occur when there was no other remedy for the marriage. The Ministry of Justice asked the Catholic Church to stop meddling, and the Catholic Church had to accept that they would not have any involvement in civil marriages and civil divorces. Monsignor Jubany from Barcelona's final request in meeting with members of the Cortes was to make divorce expensive as a way of preventing it.

==== 1979 Spanish local elections ====
In the municipal elections of 1979, the first since Franco's death, the Basque Nationalist Party won 11 of the 21 seats in the Basque Country.

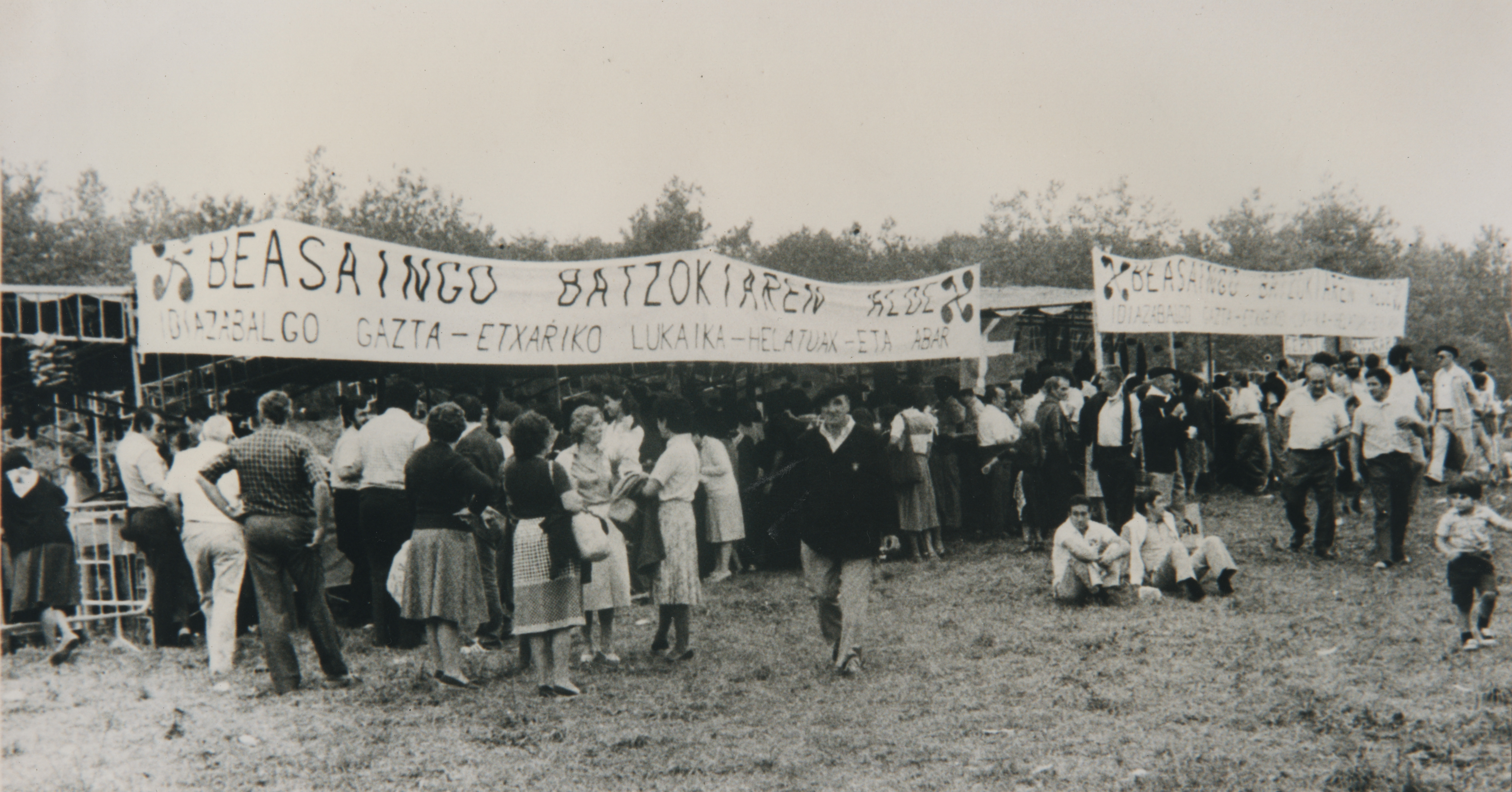
Men and women attending the EAJ-PNV Party Day in Beasain in 1979.

==== Spanish general elections of 1979 ====
The PCE adopted in their status at the 1978 Party Congress a statement that said they were "the vanguard political organization of the working class." At the same time, they also asserted they were "the progressive forces of Spain. In it are voluntarily integrated men and women proceeding from the working class, the peasantry, the forces of culture, and from other sectors of the population." Women were just one of many social groups the organization was trying to attract.

Ahead of the 1979 elections, PSOE's González decided to abandon Marxism as a party principle. He believed that doing so would make the party more attractive to Spanish women voters who were supporting more centrist oriented parties. As a result, PSOE managed to win over many women from Union of the Democratic Centre. In some regions, women PSOE voters heavily outnumber their male counterparts.

=== 1980–1981 ===
In July 1981, divorce was again legal with 260,000 legal separations and 195,000 divorces being processed between 1981 and 1990.

In 1981, 22,000 Spanish women went to London for an abortion. In 1981, the Comisión Pro Derecho al aborto de Madrid produced a 39 page document detailing statistical information about abortion in Spain based on data from the Centro de Mujeres de Vallecas. Its data found that of the 820 women who had abortions, 68% were married, 3% were widowed and 29% were single. Of the 600 women were data was available, they found that 86.9% had their abortion before 12 weeks, that 72% had gone abroad despite limited financial resources to secure an abortion, and that 45.69% had an abortion for economic reasons.

In 1981, Soledad Becerril became a minister in the Spanish government. She was the first woman minister in Spain since the Second Spanish Republic.

Partido Feminista de España was founded in 1975 by Lidia Falcón, constituted in 1979 in Barcelona and registered in 1981.

While PCE had positioned itself to be a leading left-wing organization in the transition period, generational differences and ideological differences of the role of women would speed up its political irrelevancy by 1981. Failure to address women's issues played a key role in they party's electoral losses in the 1982 Spanish general elections.

=== 1982 ===
Abortion remained illegal, with eleven women being convicted of having abortions in 1982. One of these eleven received a prison sentence of ten years. The law would not change until 1985, when medically induced abortions were allowed if a mother's life was at risk, if the pregnancy was a result rape, or if the fetus had a deformity. 58,000 abortions would take place in Spain between 1987 and 1989. An amnesty petition for the Bilbao 11 was signed by over 1,300 women, including politicians, singers, artists and journalists who all affirmed that they abortions too. All but the person who performed the abortions were given amnesty in 1982. As a consequence of the Bilbao cases, the Government stopped attempts to prosecute women who had illegal abortions.

A protest was held outside the Palau de la Generalitat in 1982 in support of the Bilbao eleven. By that point, they had been in prison for six years. At least one woman had been denounced by her ex-husband. In addition to prison times, prosecutors were seeking to strip the accused of their right to vote. At the Palau de la Generalitat protest in Barcelona, the police violently acted protesters. Police give several women head wounds.

Basque nationalists believed that the new Socialist led government of 1982 would be more willing to engage in rapprochement. The media and other Spanish political parties accused the 1982 PSOE led government of being weak on terrorism. Consequently, Prime Minister Felipe González directed his government to crack down on ETA killings. The Spanish government also reached out to their French counterparts, and got agreements to try to stop Spanish Basque ETA members from coordinating their violence against Spain from French Basque territories. The government also placed ETA members in prisons around Spain, instead of exclusively within the Basque Country, under the belief this would make it easier for members to leave the organization after their prison sentences ended.

==== Divorce law of 1981 ====
The issue of passing divorce legislation came to a head in 1981, pitting the Catholic Church more visibly against Spain's leftist elements. The new Pope John Paul II appointed a new conservative Nuncio in Madrid who would speak much more openly about his political oppositions to government reforms on the issue. At the same time UCD Minister of Justice Iñigo Cavero was replaced by the more liberal social democrat Francisco Fernández Ordóñez who changed the text of the proposed bill to be more liberal, over opposition of Christian democrats who preferred Fernández Ordóñez's text. Francisco Fernández Ordoñez famously said during the debate, "We can not prevent marriages from breaking, but we can prevent the suffering of broken marriages." (Spanish: “No podemos impedir que los matrimonios se rompan pero sí podemos impedir el sufrimiento de los matrimonios rotos”.) Because of his support for the passage of the law, his fellow ministers asked for his resignation. Ana María Pérez del Campo, the president of a feminist organization, said of the Francisco Fernández Ordoñez's actions, "The Church offered fierce resistance. The minister always remained firm and Suarez also. We must thank the UCD the law that was considered in Europe as one of the most progressive and was agreed with us." The divorce issue would split UCD, harming them going into the 1982 elections. The Catholic Church predicted that the passage of the law would result in 500,000 divorces would be applied for the first year of legalization.

The divorce law passed the Congreso de Diputados on 22 June 1981 and became official on 7 July 1981. Law 30/1981, the divorce law, passed by a vote of 162 to 128, with 7 abstentions. At the time of the passage, the divorce law required cause. This included reasons such as alcoholism, infidelity or abandonment of the home. Spouses were required to undergo a judicial review before being allowed to apply for a divorce. A couple needed to have not been cohabiting for more than a year when they filed. After having the judicial separation, they then could not be cohabiting for another year. At that step, the couple was allowed to ask for a divorce. The process was designed to make divorce difficult to get. The law came into force on 9 August. Despite the divorce law making national news, most Spaniards were indifferent to the law's passage.

The first Spanish woman to be granted a divorce was Julia Ibars, who was granted a divorce on 7 September 1981 in Santander. She filed for divorce within hours of the legislation legalizing divorce of Spain passing. Ibars had a religious divorce granted in April 1980 from Ecclesiastical Court of Santander, and the couple had no children. Ibars became a media start after her divorce to Vidal Gutiérrez was granted. She did not realize at the time how historic her divorce was. 29 divorce cases were also filed in Barcelona within hours of the law passing. Another 3 requests were filed in other parts of Catalonia. Numbers were lower in other parts of Spain. On the first day, only two divorce applications were filed in Madrid. None were applied for in Bilbao, Seville, Valladolid and Valencia. Demand would increase in Barcelona, with 1,400 additional requests for divorce within the first three months of legalization. Barcelona did not set up a Family Court to handle divorce cases until September 1981. Rafael Hueso was the first man in Catalonia to be granted a divorce in Catalonia, legally terminating his relationship with his wife whom he had been separated from for 36 years in mid-October 1981.

==== Spanish general elections of 1982 ====
The end of the transition period is generally considered 1982, with the elections that saw PSOE come to power. Women voters in general favored centrist parties during the 1982 elections. PCE had the lowest percentages of women voters among all parties elected to the Cortes.

In the democratic transition period, PNV and Convergència i Unió (CiU) were both considered moderate regional parties. Women voters in general favored centrist parties during the 1982 elections, like PNV, CiU and Centro Democrático y Social (CDS). Women disavowed more the extremist elements like ETA, Herri Batasuna (HB), Catalan nationalists ERC, and Galician radicals.

The 1982 Spanish general elections were a landslide victory of PSOE, and see 18 of the 22 women in Congress be party members. Despite this, women affiliated with PSOE continued to deal with issues of dual militancy, where they battled both for their political goals and feminist ideology that sometimes could be at odds with each other. More men than women voted for PSOE in the 1982 elections.

=== 1983 ===
1979 was a pivotal year for abortion rights with the Bilbao Trial (Spanish: Juicio de Bilbao). The trial involved ten women and one man who were prosecuted for performing abortions. The proceedings were suspended several times in the interim. The trial absolved nine of the women involved. A man who induced the abortions and a woman who performed them were found guilty. The ruling was appealed, with the appeal being suspended several times before being heard at the end of 1983. The results of the appeal resulted in four women being acquitted, and six women and the man were given prison sentences. In the end, those seven would eventually be pardoned by the state. Six of the women involved had serious health problems that would have made their pregnancies risky to their lives. The court later found justified therapeutic interventions to terminate their pregnancies.

PSOE introduced legislation to legalize abortion in 1983 through an amendment to Spain's penal code. Abortion was finally made legal by Congress later that year by a vote of 186 - 50, but did not enter into legal effect until July 1985 as Coalición Popular (now Partido Popular) challenged the constitutionality of the law. The decriminalization of abortion was allowed for three reasons. The first was that it was ethical in the case of rape. The second was it could be a necessary to save the life of the mother. The third reason was that eugenic, allowing abortion in case of fetal malformation. The three rules allowing abortion were criticized, especially on the grounds of mental health of the mother as abortion opponents believed in practice it allowed abortion on demand, even though women were required by law to have a psychiatrist testify to their mental health issues before the procedure could be performed.

=== 1984–1985 ===
María Dolores Gonzalez Catarain was murdered by two ETA members in September 1985 while out on a walk with her young child. She was targeted because having been part of the ETA Directorate, she had made the decision to dissociate herself from the group.

The abortion law would not change until 1985, when medically induced abortions were allowed if a mother's life was at risk, if the pregnancy was a result of rape (within the first 12 weeks), or if the fetus had a deformity (within the first 22 weeks). Criminal penalties still applied if abortions were provided outside these contexts, including one to three years of prison for doctors along with loss of license, and six months to a year in prison or a fine for women.

The abortion rate for Spanish women seeking the procedure abroad fell in 1984, the year before abortion was legalized. This was likely a result of an increased number of illegal abortions taking place in Spain in newly opened women's health clinics. In 1985, shortly before abortion became legal, Mari Carmen Talavera died in Madrid as the result of an illegal abortion. Her death would result in several feminist and pro-legalized abortion chants being created. In 1985, Partido Popular tabled a proposed law that would have allowed doctors to express moral objections to performing abortions, even when such an abortion would have been legal. This law did not pass. Starting in 1986, health care centers that performed abortions were required to provide the government with data regarding the total numbers of abortions they performed and demographic data about women who sought abortions. This was coupled with a law that required women to have two doctors sign off on the procedure before she could have her abortion.

A national health service was created in 1985. This service provided women for the first time with state run family planning services that included contraception.

== Basque nationalism ==
ETA militants killed women in this period, notably female members of Guardia Civil. ETA justified this as these women not being women, only representatives of Guardia Civil. Estimates in this period female membership in ETA at around 10%. Egizan was a feminist organization affiliated to ETA as their women's political organization. María Dolores Gonzalez Catarain had become a leader in ETA by the end of the 1970s. Prior to this, most women were only collaborators in the movement. Descriptions of ETA women being "dangerous elements" of Spanish society would continue into the democratic transition period.

There was no large change in the composition of Spain's security services during the 1980s. Because of the lack of a purge, many of those who had been involved in the arrest and torture of female ETA activists remained in place well into the 1980s. In the early 1980s, 8% of ETA militants in Spanish prisons were women. During the 1980s, Herri Batasuna, ETA's political arm, had a number of female participants. Much of their involvement was around seeking amnesty for ETA members in prison. Women affiliated with ETA were allegedly tortured in prison, with the worst state actors being women police officers. Some of these ETA prisoners could not understand how female police officers could not feel sympathy towards their fellow women.
