= Women in 1970s Francoist Spain =

Women in 1970s Francoist Spain were arrested and tortured for their involvement in underground unions during the Francoist period.

== 1970s Francoist Spain ==
In the Basque Country, Basque and Spanish women remained socially isolated until the 1970s when younger women began to push their way inside the dominant culture. This included going to bars and restaurants. Female internal migrants in the Basque Country began to be accepted as more Basque than those who had lived in the region for generations, in part because they were more willing to become politically engaged on discussions of Basque nationalism. This political awakening also enabled these women to become more active in efforts to counter the regime.

Women in the Cortes Españolas provided negligible contributions to the body during the 1940s and 1950s, these women would be more influential during the 1960s and 1970s as Spain's economy changed and broader Spanish culture demanded contradictory and complex things from women as the regime tried to keep the changing culture in line with its fascist ideology.

During the 1960s and 1970s, the Women's Section of Falange (Sección Femenina) aided in raising expectations of what was possible for women to accomplish by taking personal responsibility for their actions.

=== Women in opposition to the regime ===
Socialist Unión General de Trabajadores and Communist Comisiones Obreras were the two leading underground secret unions during the 1960s and 1970s. Women were involved with UGT as part of their opposition to the regime.

Women were arrested and tortured for their involvement in the Francoist period. Security officers would insult women, questioning their status as both women and mothers.

The high-profile quarrels among leftist women and increasingly involvement of male dominated political organizations led to the creation in the 1970s of third-wave radical feminism in Spain, that was both similar and notably dissimilar to their American counterparts of the same name by being more explicitly socialist and politically focused on class in their orientation. These women would found Partido Feminist (PF) and Seminario Colectivo Feminista, an organization founded in 1976 as a result in a split inside PF.

==== Partido Comunista de España ====
Women in PCE were pressured to have sex in the mid-1960s and 1970s to prove that they were free. There was an element of lack of choice if they wanted to prove their leftist credentials. According to Merche Comalleba, "The PCE militants told us that we were some sluts, some whores, that our goals were neither feminist nor political nor anything". PCE student activist Paco Fernández Buey said of the mid-1960s, "It was natural for an imprisoned male communist's girlfriend to be virtuous and faithful to force, even if her partner was not going to get out of jail in decades."

Carmen Muriana worked for ODAG and then Standard Eléctrica y Plata Meneses during the 1970s. Her work put her into contact with a number of clandestine organizations including Liga Comunista Revolucionaria, CCOO and PCE. With them, she participated in strike actions and demonstrations. She also distributed union propaganda.

==== Partido Socialista Obrero Español ====
Ludivina García Arias, daughter of Spanish exiles, returned to Spain from Mexico in 1969. She was part of a generational shift in PSOE leadership in the 1970s. Within a few years, she married PSOE Asturias leader Juan Luis Rodríguez Vigil. One of her first jobs was assisting other returning exiles in dealing with their paperwork.

During the early 1970s, Asturian socialists and militants played a critical role in providing a renewal for PSOE and UGT's leadership. During the early 1970s, Ana María Ruiz-Tagle Morales was in contact with exterior leadership in Toulouse.

Encarna Vega and Ludivina García Arias both spent time in hiding. They worked to coordinate their activities to promote UGT and PSOE in Oviedo during the early 1970s. During the 1970s, Encarna Vega ran a hair salon, and used her Oveido home to host PSOE party meetings before the local party found a more permanent home. Ana María Ruiz-Tagle Morales assisted in re-organizations socialist organizations in the Andalusia, and in reinvigorating PSOE Executive Committees during the early 1970s.

By 1970, many liberal and socialist women had left the Catholic Church in Spain. These women joined clandestine political organizations and trade unions. During the 1970s, the core female constituency of PSOE was composed of returned children of Spanish exiles. The women that proposed the Secretariado Femenino would be responsible for proposing its elimination at the 1970 PSOE Congress. Their argument was the organization had achieved limited results and PSOE had more pressing needs related to organizational restructuring. Carmen García Bloise was the primary defender of the Secretariado Femenino at the 1970 PSOE Congress. She believed that without it, it would be hard for women to become involved with and have their issues taking seriously within the socialist movement. Despite her opposition, PSOE dissolved the Secretariado Femenino. Despite Ana María Ruiz-Tagle Morales, Carmen García Bloise and Dulce del Moral working together in the early 1970s, there was never the possibility of Grupo Femenino del PSOE in Seville as it would have led to a rupture within PSOE. All three women considered the broader political goals of PSOE more important than the specific needs of socialist women as a group.

=== Basque nationalism ===
Female ETA members were portrayed by the Spanish media as being one half of a terrorist couple. During the 1970s, many of the women who joined ETA did so as a result of encouragement from their boyfriends and husbands. They would often function as a couple within the organization's operations. In other cases, the recruitment by men would mean that these new female members were only viewed inside the organization as women who could fill traditional women's roles. Only when women joined on their own could they generally escape gender discrimination. During the latter parts of the regime, some women used ETA to establish their own independence and as a form of rejecting gender norms imposed on them by both the regime and by conservative Basque society. Becoming involved with ETA represented a dual rejection of both the state and of passive womanhood.

During the 1970s, ETA was closely aligned with the Provisional Irish Republican Army (PIRA) and the Palestine Liberation Organization (PLO). Their relationship was close enough with these groups that they held joint training activities together. María Dolores González Katarain joined ETA in the early 1970s when she was in her teens. While teaching in San Sebastian, she attained the rank of militante legal. She soon became involved with José Echevarría, nicknamed as Beltza. The couple had many mutual friends. Echevarría died in 1973 after accidentally setting off a bomb he was carrying.

== Women's rights ==
=== Abortion ===
Because abortion was illegal in Spain, during the 1970s, Spanish women who could afford it went to London to get abortions. Between 1974 and 1988, 195,993 Spanish women traveled to England and Wales to get an abortion. Women also went to the Netherlands in this period to have abortions. France was not an option, as at the time it required women who had abortions to be French residents and have resided in the country for at least three months. Women then needed to wait a week to reflect before they could get an abortion. An unknown number of women went to North Africa and Portugal for abortions.

Total abortions among Spanish women that took place in Spain, England and Wales, and the Netherlands
1974-1995	Spain		England and Wales		The Netherlands		Total		ref
Years	Number of abortions	Rate per 1000 reproductive aged women	Number	Rate	Number	Rate	Number	Rate	ref
1974	-	-	2,978	0.4	-	-	2,978	0.4	
1975	-	-	4393	0.59	-	-	4393	0.59	

=== Adultery ===
During the early and mid-1970s, the Supreme Court received a large number of appeals from women over their adultery convictions. A man was convicted on 15 October 1976, and was granted an appeal a year and a half later. The Supreme Court said in granting the appeal, "nothing is said in the judgment appealed regarding the fact that the defendant had knowledge of the woman's marital status." Another woman who had a relationship was less fortunate, with the Supreme Court dismissing her appeal despite her claim that she had permission of her husband. The court said in rejecting the appeal, "there was no consent, because although the husband knew the behavior of his wife, he could not exercise the action while the guilty lived abroad." A man and a woman appealed their 14 September 1973 adultery conviction on the grounds of marital separation on the part of the woman. The Supreme Court rejected this, saying, "as long as the marriage is not annulled or the current legality is modified, the marriage bond subsists and its ethical and fidelity duties remain."

=== Contraception ===
For many married Andalusian women in this period, there was a certain fatalism about the fact they would inevitably become mothers. It was difficult for them to try to negotiate family planning with their spouses.

Prohibitions against the sale of contraception in Andalusia in the 1950s, 1960s and 1970s were largely ineffective as women had various means to try to limit the number of children they had. This was especially true for women engaging in sex outside of marriage at a time when that practice, along with having children when single, were highly condemned by the government. Women were willing to take risks to have sex for pleasure by using some form of birth control.

=== Divorce ===
During the Franco period, there was the concept of "hidden divorce". These were declarations by the Spanish Catholic Church that a marriage was nullified. They were different from ecclesiastical courts dissolution of marriages. These annulments were only allowed because of Pauline privilege, where the church may grant a nullification for a marriage where neither spouse has been baptized. This method of nullification may only be granted when one spouse wishes to convert to Catholicism and the other does not. This allows the converted Catholic spouse to be able to remarry a practicing Catholic. Another way a marriage could end under Catholic law was known as Petrine privilege. A divorce could be granted if the married coupled included a Catholic and non-Catholic spouse, where the Catholic spouse wanted the separation so they could remarry to a Catholic.

Divorce in the late Franco period and early transition period was available via ecclesiastical tribunals. These courts could nullify marriage for a fee. So, they were mostly only available to the rich, with the most famous types of this nullification involving Isabel Preysler and Carmencita Martínez Bordiú. The Civil Courts would only be involved in separation procedures at the provisional level. The Catholic Church was actively opposed to civil divorce in the mid and late 1970s.

== By year ==
=== 1970 ===
Prince Juan Carlos was appointed as Franco's official successor in 1970, with Admiral Luis Carrero Blanco being the unofficial successor.

By 1970, many liberal and socialist women had left the Catholic Church in Spain. These women joined secret political organizations and trade unions. Women also stopped becoming nuns, with a 30% decrease in the number of women in convents from the previous decade.

In 1970, 2 million units of the pill were sold in Spain.

The 1970 Education Act guaranteed free education for all Spanish citizens.

Sección Femenina had been trying to organize the Congreso Internacional de la Mujer since 1967. Their initial efforts were delayed several years, including for budget reasons in 1969. The congress was finally held in 1970 from 7–14 June in Madrid. 900 people from 44 countries attended. This conference would play an important role in the establishing of the United Nations Year of the Woman in 1975. People and groups Federation Internationale des Femmes des Carrières Juridiques, founder María Telo, Universidad de Madrid sociologist and professor María Ángeles Durán, María Moliner and María del Campo Alange, the Associations of Housewives and Italian historian Giulia Gadaleta. Most came as individuals, not as official representatives of different organizations. This was because many participants were hesitant to have their organizations being seen as supporting an organization, Sección Femenina, that they considered retrograde when it came to women's rights. Despite many attendees thinking abortion, divorce and contraceptive were important to understanding the situation of Spanish women, these topics were largely out of bounds because of Sección Femenina's positions on them. Sección Femenina tried to drive working groups to discuss the needs of children and how to incorporate women into public life.

In 1970, the First International Women's Congress was held, giving Sección Feminina contact with other Spanish and international women's groups. It was part of a reality that Sección Feminina could no longer ignore these groups as Spain started to undergo social upheaval because of contradictory demands upon women.

The 1970 Burgos military trial against ETA involved three women.

Percentage degree of regional language familiarity by Spanish housewives in 1970
Region	Understand	Speak	Read	Write
Galicia	96	92	42	24
Balearic Islands	94	91	51	10
Catalonia	90	77	62	38
Valencia	88	69	46	16
Basque Provinces	50	46	25	12

Percentage attitudes in 1970 of Spanish housewives for having their children speak regional languages
Region	Would Like it Very Much or Fairly Much	Believe it Necessary (Very Much or Fairly Much)
Galicia	97	87
Balearic Islands	91	75
Catalonia	78	50
Valencia	73	49
Basque Provinces	69	31

==== Women in PSOE in 1970 ====
From 1965 to 1970, Carmen García Bloise was a member of the PSOE Steering Committee in exile.

With the renovation of the PSOE executive committee in the period between 1970 and 1974, practices around women's issues remained the same as they had during the past. They did not create any structures to legitimize women's issues. They offered little to women to suggest the socialists were a legitimate force for deal with women's issues.

Carmen García Bloise represented the Paris Section at the XI PSOE Congress in 1970. From 1970 to 1972, Carmen García Bloise was a substitute member of the PSOE Steering Committee in exile based on her position in the sixth area (Seiene).

María Begoña Abdelkader García joined a clandestine socialist organization in July 1970.

Carmen Muriana returned to London in January 1970, but quickly made the decision to permanently return home to Madrid and takes a job in a marble shop. Fired because she became pregnant, she worked with her union Sindicato Vertical to protest the dismissal and was compensated for wrongful termination.

=== 1971 ===
Despite women having made small incremental advancements in their rights during the 1960s, there were only six female provisional deputies in 1971. This would increase some by the time of Franco's death, when 1.38% of local Councillors were women including 62 of the country's 8,635 mayors.

In 1969 at the Federación Internacional de Mujeres de Carreras Jurídicas conference, María Telo Núñez in Madrid presented a paper on the rights of women under Spain's civil code. This presentation would inspire the creation in 1971 of the Asociación Española de Mujeres Juristas. The groups's goal was to reform family law, which was done with the changes on 2 May 1975.

==== Women in UGT and PSOE in 1971 ====
As a result of her militancy, Ludivina García Arias moved to Asturias in 1971.

The XI Congreso of UGT in 1971 resulted in a rupture inside UGT as a result of divisions over who should govern the organization. The interior side was led by an executive committee formed by Nicolás Redondo, Eduardo López Albizu, Agustín González, Enrique Múgica, Pablo Castellano and Felipe González from the interior, and Antonio García Duarte, José Mata, Paulino Barrabés, Manuel Simón, and Juan Iglesias from the exterior. They were supported in their efforts by Carmen García Bloise, who at the time was working as an accountant for Renault in Paris.

Carmen García Bloise held several positions in UGT in the early 1970s, including being part of the National Committee as substitute member representing the seventh area (Seine) from 1971 to 1973, a member of the Committee of Formation of the Militant from 1971 to 1975, and a delegate of the Departmental Group of Seine to the XI UGT Congress in exile in 1971.

=== 1972 ===
The intention to organize the International Year of Women was announced by the United Nations in 1972. Sección Feminina then launched a political campaign to be the point organization for United Nation plans around women. Absent of any other organization capable of doing this, the government agreed and published their decision in Decreto 950/1974. The regime followed this with statements about plans to reform or eliminate laws that incapacitated women.

==== Women in UGT and PSOE in 1972 ====
In 1972, with the help of Asturian socialists and militants, PSOE leadership moved from the exterior in Toulouse to the interior with the decision ratified by the PSOE Congress in 1974. Carmen García Bloise represented the Paris Section at the XI PSOE Congress in 1972.

Carmen García Bloise would be appointed the Secretary of the Formación del Militante in 1972 by the new PSOE committee following the XII Congreso of PSOE that saw the interior finally come into power. Carmen García Bloise's elevation to the executive committee of PSOE in 1972 marked the first time a woman had served in this role for PSOE since the Spanish Civil War. She would be dismissed in 1974 after the election of Felipe González as PSOE Secretary General. Despite this, Carmen García Blois left her job at Renault and moved to Madrid where she became PSOE's accountant. She was joined by another woman, Miguel Ángel Martínez's Egyptian wife Myriam Soliman who served as Felipe González's personal secretary. She also served as the PSOE Organization and Administration of the Executive Commission manager.

=== 1973 ===
Carrero Blanco was assassinated in 1973 by ETA. For many people in Spain, the period that marked the beginning transition of Spain to a democracy occurred on 20 December 1973 with the death of Luis Carrero Blanco as a result of an attack by ETA. Genoveve Forest Tarat played a critical role in ETA's assassination of Spanish Premier Admiral Carrero Blanco on 12 December 1973.

The Código Penal de 1963 sees a new penal code established in Spain, with the new abortion laws bearing little difference from the 1941 laws. Minor modifications were added such as penalties given to doctors who conducted abortions and pharmacists who provided drugs to assist abortions. When the Código Penal was established again in 1973, it was a copy of the 1963 version.

=== 1974 ===
In dealing with the evolving problems of women, President of Government Arias Navarro said in 1974 ahead of the International Year of the Woman, that Spain needed a "genuine and profitable Spanish feminism", a feminism that had Spanish origins and was free of foreign influence. It should not come from "communities of traditions well differentiated to ours or that are in a very different state of development." Navarro was likely indicating support for Sección Femenina, and not for other qualified Spanish feminists of the period like Mercedes Formica and Maria Angeles Durán.

In 1974 and 1975, there were no full women's associations as the government required they have more than 19 members, and the Catholic Church was still involved in trying to discourage the official recognition of such associations.

In 1974, 2,863 Spanish women had abortions in London.

In 1974, 51% of the doctors said in a survey that they considered the existence of free birth control consultations to be something they would like to see offered by the government.

Ana María Pérez del Campo publicly announced her intention to separate from her husband of four years starting in 1961. Eight years later, in 1969, she started the process to try to legal separate from him. It would take many years before she was able to succeed. In 1974, when Franco was still alive, she founded the National Federation of Associations of Separated and Divorced Women to teach women about the rights they had under the law, and the rights women lacked. Her efforts to separate from her husband were not normal for the time, but also not unusual in that many couples just moved into separate houses.

The Spanish Association of University Women was created in 1953 in Oviedo, and then later that same year in Madrid. Delegations were then created in Barcelona in 1970, and Granada, Valencia, Santander, A Coruña and Valladolid in 1974 and 1975.

In 1974, MDM changed their name to Movimiento para la Liberación de la Mujer (MDM-MLM) and became more explicitly feminist in their political activism. In this new period of activity, they were attacked by many leftist organizations who believed they were too bourgeois and that a focus on feminist goals was a distraction from the broader class based struggle in Spain. At the same time, MDM-MLM also challenged traditional patriarchal left wing views on women. They were also attacked by the right for being communists, anti-woman and anti-regime. The group faced internal divisions on whether they needed male activists to achieve women's political goals, or whether they should remain sex segregated so as to challenge patriarchal beliefs. Movimiento Democrático de Mujeres's main issues reflected those of PCE, including lowering food prices, improved pedestrian safety by creating more crosswalks, and showing solidarity with political prisoners. PCE believed these were the only issues for which housewives could be mobilized.

1974 percentages of women by education level and birth control method based on Fundación FOESSA survey
Birth control method known	Without any education	Primary education	Middle education	Technical and professional education	Higher education	All levels of education
None	24	14	6	8	8	12
Coitus interruptus	19	22	57	44	66	31
Rhythm method and derivatives	13	30	72	60	83	41
Condoms	36	44	71	71	82	51
The pill	37	60	79	76	80	64
No answer	27	18	9	6	4	16

==== Women in PSOE and UGT in 1974 ====
Carmen Romero moved with her husband to Madrid in 1974 after he became the Secretary General of PSOE. She took up teaching in Madrid and became more active in UGT's Federación Española de Trabajadores de la Enseñanza .

Josefina Arrillaga returned to Spain in 1974. She would briefly rejoin PSOE during the transition period. Matilde Fernández joined PSOE in the last years of the dictatorship.

=== 1975 ===
The regime's relation to the Basque language and Basque nationalism has three periods. The third phase was from 1975 to 1982. Starting before the death of Franco, this period started a period of reconciliation around the Basque language and Basque culture. In August 1975, there was a second wave of violence in the Basque provinces, including the murder of several policemen. This resulted in the police arresting a number of ETA affiliated people, including ten who were arrested for the murders. Of these ten, two were women who both claimed to be pregnant. All were given death sentences. The women and four others were given a reprieve by Franco, who was trying to make the regime appear more tolerant internationally.

In 1975, 4,230 Spanish women had abortions in London.

By 1975, official estimates suggested half a million Spanish women were on the pill. The media, both general and specialized, covered the pill, where it was known as an anovulatory treatment. Its introduction in Spain allowed women's sexuality to be discussed for the first time, especially in medical and religious publications and more generally in women's publications.

Lawyer María Telo played an important role in the legal easing of restrictions for women in May 1975. The regime allowed the lifting of restrictions as part of its attempts to change its international image in light of the 1975 UN International Year of Women.

Ahead of the Year of the Woman, the government created eight commissions to investigate the status of Spanish women. The government used reports from these commissions to produce two reports that were published in 1975. They were La situación de la mujer en España and Memoria del Año Internacional de la Mujer. Among the findings were that the number of lesbians was increasing as a result of a number of factors including "physical or congenital defects", the "affective traumas and unsatisfied desires", family being unable to prevent women's conversation, "Contagion and mimicry" and "[...] the lack of relationship with men as a consequence of an excess education rigidly rigid, the existence of institutions that by their very nature eliminate these relationships: prisons, hospitals, psychiatric, religious communities etc ..., the media, tourism, alcohol, drugs and desire of search for new sensations, prostitution, and vice." To tackle the problem of the growing lesbian population, the government commission proposed solutions like "early diagnoses and medical treatments and psychotherapeutics that [corrected] possible somatic defects", creating a sex education program and the promotion of the idea that both genders can peacefully co-exist. In their reports, single motherhood was identified as a problem, though they noted it was in decline which they attributed in part to the use of the pill and other contraceptives, and to women having abortions in other countries where the practice was legal.

PSUC, the Catalan Socialist Party, had many feminists involved in 1975, the year Franco died. They were pushing both PSUC and PCE to adopt more feminists politics. PCE student activist Paco Fernández Buey said, "Many of them, considering that communism was a revolutionary ideology, pushed the PCE to recognize the need to extend universal civil liberties to women. " Trade unions were officially not allowed in Francoist Spain with the nominal exception of the Falange led union organization Comisiones Obreras (CCOO). The CCOO tended to attract little female membership. When they did, Falangist women would often find themselves working alongside socialist and communist women and would serve as a focused source of opposition to the regime before Comisiones Obreras was banned in 1967.

In October 1975, Carmen García Bloise and her husband Rafael Robledo moved to Madrid.

Franco died in November 1975. To avoid bloodshed following the death of Franco on 20 November 1975, left leaning parties like PSOE and PCE agreed to the "pact of silence" which largely involved not discussing or seeking to prosecute atrocities committed by the Franco regime during its time in power, or by either side during the Spanish Civil War.
