= Women in 1960s Spain =

Women in 1960s Spain oversaw a period of transition from the domestic sphere to the workplace.

== Period overview ==
Internal Spanish women migrants found life in Spain difficult during the 1940s, 1950s and 1960s as Francoist policy dictated they remain in the home. Unlike their husbands who could new develop social connections through outside employment, immigrant women were isolated having left behind their social networks in their home countries.

Starting in the 1950s, Spain started adopting a more consumerist economy. This would continue on into the 1960s and would play a role in introducing Spanish women to the new modern Western woman. This introduction would result in the gradual erasure of the Francoist concept of Catholic womanhood.

By the 1960s, Francoist Spain had changed its definition of Catholic womanhood. A woman's purpose was no longer considered to be solely for procreation and companionship, but as beings for whom Spanish cultural meaning rested.

Despite being contraception being illegal, by the mid-1960s, Spanish women had access to the contraceptive pill. Women could be prescribed the pill by their doctors if they were married and could make a case that they had a gynecological problem which the pill could fix, but this reason could not be a desire to avoid being pregnant.

The 1960s marked an economic shift in Spain, as the country moved from an agrarian based economy of the rural countryside to an industrial based economy of the cities. This necessitated the introduction of women on a large scale into the Spanish workforce. The 1960s saw the same inequalities of the past, with most of the economic gains going towards the bourgeois while the poor were left destitute and unable to strike for better working conditions. Parts of rural Castile and still lacked roads, electricity and running water.

By the end of the 1960s, women increasingly began to express their dissatisfaction with state imposed patriarchy. Their dissatisfaction would play a large role in the later collapse of the regime following Franco's death.

Women in the Cortes Españolas provided negligible contributions to the body during the 1940s and 1950s, these women would be more influential during the 1960s and 1970s as Spain's economy changed and broader Spanish culture demanded contradictory and complex things from women as the regime tried to keep the changing culture in line with its fascist ideology.

Pilar Primo de Rivera was viewed by many inside the regime as a critical player in successfully encouraging Franco to relax restrictions for women during this period.

Starting in the 1960s, women's groups and feminists organizations began to emerge. Women's associations were tolerated by the regime but were not completely legal.

During the 1960s and 1970s, the Women's Section of Falange (Sección Femenina) aided in raising expectations of what was possible for women to accomplish by taking personal responsibility for their actions.

=== Women in opposition to the regime ===
It was only during the 1950s and 1960s that some of the Communist women involved with POUM and Trotskyite purges began to re-evaluate their role in them; their change of hearts only occurred after Stalinist Communism lost its prestige among leftist circles.

Women were arrested and tortured for their involvement in Basque nationalist groups in the Francoist period. Security officers would insult women, questioning their status as both women and mothers.

Socialist Unión General de Trabajadores and Communist Comisiones Obreras were the two leading underground clandestine unions during the 1960s and 1970s. Women were involved with UGT as part of their opposition to the regime.

==== Confederación Nacional del Trabajo ====
The late 1950s and early 1960s saw severe repression of CNT by Franco's government that made activism even more difficult. María Bruguera Pérez participated in clandestine meetings of CNT.

CNT was in a crisis during the 1960s. Earlier, members of the organization had signed and agreement with members of the Franco government to withdraw from active resistance in the regime. They had done so under the belief that democracy would soon emerge in Spain. This left the organization adrift. When democracy finally did come, they were unprepared.

==== Partido Comunista de España ====
The leadership of Santiago José Carrillo Solares in PCE would result in the party renouncing the use of violence in the mid-1960s. This led to a split in the party, with Partido Comunista - Marxista Leninista (PC - ml) being formed and later the founding of FRAP (Revolutionary Antifascist Popular Front).

Women in PCE were pressured to have sex in the mid-1960s and 1970s to prove that they were free. There was an element of lack of choice if they wanted to prove their leftist credentials. According to Merche Comalleba, "The PCE militants told us that we were some sluts, some whores, that our goals were neither feminist nor political nor anything". PCE student activist Paco Fernández Buey said of the mid-1960s, "It was natural for an imprisoned male communist's girlfriend to be virtuous and faithful to force, even if her partner was not going to get out of jail in decades."

==== Partido Socialista Obrero Español ====
Unlike other European countries where parties held control over unions, PSOE had very little leverage over UGT in the 1940s, 1950s and 1960s despite a large overlap in leadership. During the 1950s and 1960s, neither UGT nor PSOE put much consideration into political ideologies and practices related to improving the lives of women.

During the mid-1940s, 1950s and early 1960s, Barcelona based Movimiento Socialista de Cataluña was highly influenced by the British Labor party, who had developed extensive contacts with the group to give them legitimacy within Catalonia. Female leaders in the group in this period included Serra i Moret. PSOE's relationship with the group in this era was unstable, and Lucila Fernández was the only prominent female figure in PSOE's Catalan organization.

Carmen García Bloise was one of the female leaders inside PSOE during the 1960s. She believed that PSOE and UGT needed to be governed from inside Spain, not from the exterior. Along with others in the informal Paris group, she believed that militants inside Spain should be given greater weight and consideration inside PSOE and UGT. Her position closely aligned her with ASO. She played a critical role in understanding the need for PSOE to be governed from the interior and then assisting in moving those structures there from the exterior.

=== Basque nationalism ===
Starting in the mid-1960s, more women began to become involved with ETA militancy. Most of the women who joined up were encouraged to do so because of their fathers. Such social networks played a key role in recruiting and retaining members. These women were also more willing to directly engage in violent opposition to the regime. During the 1960s and 1970s, female ETA members were portrayed by the Spanish media as being one half of a terrorist couple.

== Women's rights ==
=== Childcare ===
One of the most prominent female-dominated labor activities in the Francoist period, especially between 1940 and 1970, was childcare. The regime used Sección Femenina and Acción Católica to impose its pro-natalist policies on Spain through the concept of traditional womanhood, that demanded among other things that women tend to the home and be primary caregivers to their children. This was expected of women, even if they were required to take on extra work inside the home or they were able to pay someone to do basic domestic tasks. Men were expected to be in the workforce, providing a steady income that would cover the costs of running the household. There was no differentiation in this period paid and domestic work for women. Both were viewed as two part of the same purpose of women serving Spanish society.

Sección Feminina and Falange provided childcare services during the 1950s and 1960s to women working in the agricultural sector. Official women's participation in this industry was around 5.5%, but informal participation was much higher, resulting in the need for childcare.

=== Contraception ===
For many married Andalusian women in the 1950s, 1960s and 1970s, there was a certain fatalism about the fact they would inevitably become mothers. It was difficult for them to try to negotiate family planning with their spouses.

Prohibitions against the sale of contraception in Andalusia in the 1950s, 1960s and 1970s were largely ineffective as women had various means to try to limit the number of children they had. This was especially true for women engaging in sex outside of marriage at a time when that practice, along with having children when single, were highly condemned by the government. Women were willing to take risks to have sex for pleasure by using some form of birth control.

The most popular method in the 1960s was coitus interruptus. Contraceptive legalization began to be an issue for Spanish feminists in the mid-1960s. This was part of their broader interest in women's reproductive rights. Among the feminists involved in this period was Santiago Dexeus Trias de Bes, an assistant doctor of the Maternitat de Barcelona who had an interest in family planning. Elvira Ramos García was also among the group. The pediatrics specialist was a member of the Communist Party of Spain and promoter of the Democratic Movement of Women in Murcia.

=== Divorce ===
During the Franco period, there was the concept of "hidden divorce". These were declarations by the Spanish Catholic Church that a marriage was nullified. They were different from ecclesiastical courts dissolution of marriages. These annulments were only allowed because of Pauline privilege, where the church may grant a nullification for a marriage where neither spouse has been baptized. This method of nullification may only be granted when one spouse wishes to convert to Catholicism and the other does not. This allows the converted Catholic spouse to be able to remarry a practicing Catholic.

Another way a marriage could end under Catholic law was known as Petrine privilege. A divorce could be granted if the married coupled included a Catholic and non-Catholic spouse, where the Catholic spouse wanted the separation so they could remarry to a Catholic.

=== Guardianship ===
Up until the mid-1960s, Franco's legal system gave husbands near total control over their wives. This would not change until women started playing a more central role in the Spanish economy.

== By year ==
=== 1960 ===
PSOE, UGT, PCE, CNT, Juventudes Socialistas de España (JSE), Movimiento Libertario Español (MLE) and the Moviment Socialista de Catalunya (MSC) continued their struggle in exile. From 1944 to 1960, the French city of Toulouse served as a major publishing hub for many of these organization's home in exile. The city of Toulouse itself would see around 40,000 exiles from these groups settle permanently in the city.

Josefina Arrillaga was at the center of the battle for the heart of PSOE and UGT between groups in the interior and the exterior. She had been serving at the primary contact with Toulouse but, on 12 April 1960, she was dismissed from this role. Despite her dismissal, Josefina Arrillaga still played a key role in facilitating clandestine communications between Toulouse and key jailed socialist figures in Spain's interior. Her role would see the November 1961 trial of seven Basque nationalists attended by the British journalist and Labour MP Ernest Davies as well as Christian Democrat Right leader José Maria Gil Robles, and the secretary of the Christian Democrat Left.

=== 1961 ===
Discrimination in employment was banned based on gender in 1961, with exceptions for the judiciary, armed forces and merchant navy. Reforms also meant that women were legally guaranteed the same wage as their male counterparts. This was done with the 22 July 1961 Ley sobre Derechos Políticos, Profesionales y de Trabajo.

Josefina Arrillaga would continue to develop her contact network in 1961 to aid in the socialist cause. New contacts would include Amnesty International founder Peter Benenson, Fritz Erler of the German SPD, German metalworks union IG Metall, and UGT members like Manuel Fernández-Montesinos living in exile in Germany.

=== 1962 ===
The Second Vatican Council held from 1962 to 1965 assisted in reshaping Catholic discourse around the definition of womanhood. These conversations often found themselves in contradiction to traditional Francoist teachings.

Starting in 1962, censorship across Spain began to officially relax. Further changes to relax censorship occurred four years later in 1966.

==== Women in PSOE and UGT in 1962 ====
From 1957 to 1962, the Franco regime faced labor strikes in Asturias, with the biggest in Pozo María Luisa. Sindicato de los Obreros Mineros de Asturias (SOMA) had its greatest strength in this region, with socialist and communist women leading the organization of strikes on 23 March 1957. They organized in two locations, including the esplanade of Pozo María Luisa and at the highway connecting Oviedo with Campo de Caso. Their actions would serve as a blueprint for future strikes at the Nalón and Caudal mining basins.

On 21 May 1962, León Ramos informed the Spanish Democrats Defence Committee (SDDC) that Amat, Josefine Arillaga and Vicente Girbau were trying to destroy PSOE from within and were actively collaborating with the communist. The SDDC was a PSOE and British Labour Party working group. The British Labour party decided to maintain contact with all involved as a 1959 party rule dictated they not become involved in internal Spanish party squabbling.

Despite support from PSOE and UGT, miners faced setbacks in the period between 1962 and 1970. Consequently, PSOE became more important in urban areas like Gijón. Encarna Vega and her husband Marcelo García Suárez played an important role in restructuring the local party apparatus. Encarna Vega also became actively involved in clandestine activities like producing and distributing party propaganda, and distributing the El Socialista and Adelante magazines.

UGT militant Manuela Moreno spent time in prisons in Caspe, Torrero and Barbastro because of her membership in UGT. Her longest sentence resulted in her not leaving prison until 1962 because she was found guilty of serving as a liaison to Aragon guerrillas.

Carmen García Bloise was delegate for the Section of Paris at the VIII UGT Congress in 1962.

=== 1963 ===
Television Española (TVE) began in 1956 with an hour of daily programs. One year later, in 1957, TVE had five hours of daily programming. In this early period, it was primarily funded by the state. By 1963, this had changed with 92% of its funding coming from commercial activities while producing 66 hours of programming a week.

A 1963 legal reform meant employers could no longer dismiss women because they were married. However, the law still required women to have a husband's permission before starting work.

The Democratic Movement of Women in Catalonia first met in 1963. They held their First General Meeting of the Democratic Movement in 1965, bringing together women from around Spanish to constitute the Women's Democratic Movement. While the Catalan organization disappeared in 1969, it continued on mostly in Madrid, Galicia and Valencia.

In 1963, Spanish communist Julian Grumau was condemned to death by the Franco regime for his alleged crimes during the Spanish Civil War.

Carmen Muriana started working as a clothing store salesperson in the early 1960s, before taking a job in a wholesale drugstore. It was in the latter position that she became involved with labor organization.

The Código Penal de 1963 sees a new penal code established in Spain, with the new abortion laws being pretty much repeated verbatim from the 1941 laws. Minor modifications included penalties being given to doctors who conducted abortions and pharmacists for providing drugs to assist abortions. When the Código Penal was established again in 1973, there was no difference from the 1963 version.

The blood revenge law was rescinded in 1963, with husbands and fathers no longer having the right to kill wives or daughters caught engaging in elicit sex acts. Those who were in prison for adultery related offences were ignored. Starting in 1975, before the death of Franco, women had started to mobilize by taking to the streets to demand the decriminalization of adultery.

=== 1964 ===
Starting in the 1960s, women's groups and feminists organizations began to emerge. Women's associations were tolerated by the regime but were not completely legal. This changed when in 1964, women's associations were legally allowed.

Despite being contraception being illegal, by the mid-1960s, Spanish women had access to the contraceptive pill. It was first sold on the commercial market in 1964, where Anovial 21 de Productos Quimicos Schering was also heavily advertised. Women could be prescribed the pill by their doctors if they were married and could make a case that they had a gynecological problem which the pill could fix, but a desire to avoid being pregnant would not be accepted as a valid reason. Its usage was primarily only allowed for the regulation of a woman's period. Many married women found it difficult to get prescriptions from their doctors, having only marginal success when they sought prescriptions from private practitioners. Consequently, most of the women who were on the pill were married upper-middle class women. Some women were given the pill to control menstrual issues, but were not told of its contraceptive properties.

In 1964, Spanish exile women began publishing Mujeres Libres again. During the 1960s in Mexico, Purificación Tomás played a leading role among exiled socialist women. She was in charge of organizing the IX Congreso of PSOE in Mexico in 1964. Purificación Tomás created the Secretariado Femenino, with the goal of integrating women's issues into the broader Spanish socialist movement. She built and maintained contacts with the Socialist International Women.

=== 1965 ===
Movimiento Democrático de Mujeres (MDM) was created in 1965 in Barcelona by communist and Catalan socialist women. The organization quickly found covert support among other women in northern Spain as they tried to accomplish socio-political goals. Because of their overt feminist ideologies, some supporters worried MDM's "doble militancia" would diminish their effectiveness as they sought to work towards concrete political goals. The organization drew from two different eras of Spanish feminists. The first was a community of older women who had suffered the most under the change from the Second Republic to Francoist Spain. The second group was known as the "pro preso" generation who came of age through clandestine neighborhood led activism. This meant the organization's feminist goals were sometimes in conflict and not well defined as members had to navigate ideological differences in what being a feminist meant.

By 1965, even most Spanish Catholics thought birth control was a reasonable option to control the number of children women had. 51.5% of Spanish Catholics believed that the rhythm method was ineffective. Even most Spanish doctors agreed that birth control was important in family planning, as only 24% of them were generally opposed to birth control.

==== Women in PSOE and UGT in 1965 ====
From 1965 to 1970, Carmen García Bloise was a member of the PSOE Steering Committee in exile.

Ana María Ruiz-Tagle Morales began her militancy in PSOE in 1965. A labor lawyer by training, her militancy was assisted by Felipe González, with whom she shared an office in Seville. She played an important role by providing legal assistance on union affairs. She served as a bridge to an earlier period with her collaborations with Dulce del Moral, who had previously been the most important militant in Andalusia.

Carmen García Bloise led UGT's Secretariado Femenino from February 1965 to August 1970.

=== 1966 ===
An election was held in 1966, where people were given the option to affirm or deny Franco's leadership. With more voters than electors, Franco was affirmed as Head of State.

In 1966, the first man was convicted in Spain for selling contraceptives. He was also charged with causing a public scandal.

==== Women in PSOE and UGT in 1966 ====
Josefina Arrillaga immigrated to Germany in 1966, which along with the arrest of figures like Manuel Fernández Montesinos and the dissolution of the Madrid PSOE group, saw Alianza Sindical Obrera (ASO) go into the decline. Arrillaga had founded ASO and it drew heavily from UGT membership, advocating for a radical change in approach for the movement in the interior. The organization was radical in that this organization co-founded by a woman ended the monopoly held by Toulouse of representing PSOE internationally.

Carmen García Bloise was member of the Committee of Formation of the Militant from 1966 to 1969.

=== 1967 ===
Trade unions were officially not allowed in Francoist Spain with the semi-official exception of the Falange led union organization Comisiones Obreras (CCOO). The CCOO tended to attract little female membership. When they did though, Falangist women would often find themselves working alongside socialist and communist women and would serve as a focused source of opposition to the regime before Comisiones Obreras was banned in 1967.

The 1967 Law on Family Representation allowed women to vote, but only if they were the head of their household.

The 1967 Ley Orgánica del Estado represented a further purge of the appearance of totalitarianism in Spain. It created separate roles for the President and Chief of State, and made the Cortes more representative of the people by creating elected officials representing voters who were heads of family, including women who led households that had no men.

The 28 June 1967 Law on Religious Freedom impacted marriage rights in Spain. This came about because of new Catholic doctrines coming out of the Second Vatican Council, including a declaration that said, "the right of freedom in religious matters is really based on the dignity of the human person [...] This right to freedom religious is to be recognized in the legal order of society, in such a way that it becomes a civil right." Article 42 was modified to state, "civil marriage is authorized when none of the parties professes the Catholic religion, without prejudice to the rites or ceremonies of the different non-Catholic confessions, which may be held before or after civil marriage as long as they do not violate morals or good customs."

Sección Femenina started trying to organize the Congreso Internacional de la Mujer in 1967.

Carmen García Bloise represented the Paris Section at the X PSOE Congress in 1967.

=== 1968 ===
Sección Feminina played a critical role in advancing changes to the 1955 Ley de Regimen Local about the role of married women in 1968. Consequently, married women were allowed to vote and run in local elections.

Police commissioner Meliton Manzanas was murdered by ETA members on 2 August 1968, with his murder being witnessed by his wife and two daughters.

The Catholic Church made their opposition to birth control known again in 1968, with Pope Paul VI publishing an article affirming the Catholic Church's opposition to artificial birth control methods like the pill.

=== 1969 ===
In 1969, María Aranzazu Arruti Odriozola was arrested for her ETA connections. The state alleged she was seeking to make connections in Navarra to further her aims. They highlighted her dangerous nature by saying she was secretly married on 5 November 1968 to Bilbao's Gregorio Vincent López Isasuegi.

MDM had always been strongly susceptible to party politics of both the Communists and Socialists. In 1969, these ideological differences would lead to the organization splitting in Catalonia. Because PCE was more organized in Madrid, MDM continued there and in other PCE strongholds. This strengthened PCE's ability to guide the organization using communist ideology.

In 1969 at the Federación Internacional de Mujeres de Carreras Jurídicas conference, María Telo Núñez in Madrid presented a paper on the rights of women under Spain's civil code. This presentation would inspire the creation in 1971 of the Asociación Española de Mujeres Juristas. The groups's goal was to reform family law, which was done with the changes on 2 May 1975.

The 22 May 1969 Decree of the Regulation of the Civil Registry made it easier for couples to marry without need to prove they were not practicing Roman Catholics.

Ana María Pérez del Campo publicly announced her intention to separate from her husband of four years starting in 1961. Eight years later, in 1969, she started the process to try to legal separate from him. It would take many years before she was able to succeed. In 1974, when Franco was still alive, she founded the National Federation of Associations of Separated and Divorced Women to teach women about the rights they had under the law, and the rights women lacked. Her efforts to separate from her husband were not normal for the time, but also not unusual in that many couples just moved into separate houses.

Elvira Ramos García attended a course organized by Planned Parenthood on contraceptive usage in 1969.

==== Women in PSOE and UGT in 1969 ====
Ludivina García Arias, daughter of Spanish exiles, returned to Spain from Mexico in 1969. She was part of a generational shift in PSOE leadership in the 1970s.

Carmen Romero and Felipe González met at university in Seville, where both were already involved in anti-Francoist militancy. On 17 July 1969, the couple were civilly married by proxy as Felipe González was in Bordeaux, only returning on 18 July for a religious ceremony. The couple had their honeymoon in France so Felipe González could attend a Socialist Youth meeting in Toulouse. Returning from their honeymoon, Carmen Romero set up a house in 1969 which later became the headquarters for the Federación Española de Trabajadores de la Enseñanza de UGT at calle Espinosa and Cárcel in Seville. By 1970, Carmen Romero was working as a teacher.

In 1969, Dulcenombre del Moral and her husband were the head of a militant PSOE group in Andalusia that included Alfonso Guerra, Felipe González, Guillermo Galeote and Luis Yánez.

In 1969, Carmen Muriana immigrated to London, working in a number of jobs including waitress and hotel receptionists. It was in London that she first began to have contact with anti-Francoists. She returned home to Madrid for Christmas on holiday that year, witnessing confrontations between the regime and opponents as a result of the Burgos process, which saw people protesting the sixteen members of ETA given a death sentence after being accused of murdering three people.
