= Women in Unión General de Trabajadores in Francoist Spain =

Women's Union

Women in Unión General de Trabajadores (UGT) in Francoist Spain played important roles in the union dating back to the Second Republic period, even as their specific needs like maternity leave, childcare provisions and equal pay were subverted for the improvement of better overall working conditions. Women UGT leaders in the Civil War period included María Lacrampe and Claudina García Perez.

In the post-Civil War period, the Franco regime confiscated all UGT property and other assets. Many members of UGT went into exile, where they formed an external UGT leadership group. Women who remained faced repression, harassment, prison and were disappeared. Feminism and socialism continued to have a fraught relationship. An interior UGT body was formed in 1943, with Claudina García Perez, Julia Vigre and Carmen Guelin some of the most important women inside Spain in this period. Socialist women worked as liaisons or as messengers for clandestine PSOE and UGT activities. In the exterior, the biggest groups were in France and Mexico.

The 1950s and 1960s continued a period where women's issues were ignored as part of broader political ideologies. PSOE also found itself having little control over UGT despite a huge overlap in leadership. Mining strikes in Asturias were some of the biggest labor challenges faced by the regime in this period, with UGT activists at the center of this. Josefina Arrillaga on the interior would begin to set the stage for the fissure that would erupt in 1970 between those in Spain and those in leadership in exile. In the interior, Carmen Romero, Carmen Muriana and Manuela Moreno would be some of those most influential women. On the exterior, Carmen García Bloise would play a pivotal role in getting UGT to change leadership to the interior.

Leadership was formally changed from the exterior to the interior by 1971 with the help of Asturian unionists and militants. Franco died in 1975. The involvement of women in the movement assisted in a push for more democratic ideals that would come about in the 1970s, which would also see feminism merge politically with the movement as part of individual and collective goals towards creating a more democratic society following the death of Franco. In 2019, UGT declared itself as an explicitly feminist union.

== Background ==
Francoist Spain was a pseudo-fascist state whose ideology rejected what it considered the inorganic democracy of the Second Republic. It was an embrace of organic democracy, defined as a reassertion of traditional Spanish Roman Catholic values that served as a counterpoint to the Communism of the Soviet Union during the same period. It came into exist in 1939 following the end of the Spanish Civil War. Misogyny and heteronormativity where linchpins of fascism in Spain, where the philosophy revolved around patria and fixed gender roles that praised the role of strong male leadership.

In July 1936, the Spanish Civil War started with a military coup attempt launched from the Spanish enclave of Melilla. In October of that same year, Franco took over as the Generalissimo and Chief of State in Nationalist zones. On 19 April 1937, Catholic and Falangist parties were merged, making Falange Española Tradicionalista the official state party behind Nationalist lines. On 30 January 1938, the first National State Cabinet meeting was held, with the Spanish Civil War formally coming to an end on 1 April 1939 and an official government formalized on 8 August 1939.

The Franco regime banned all political parties and trade unions. The only permissible type organization was Falange, founded by José Antonio Primo de Rivera in 1933. An election was held in 1966, where people were given the option to affirm or deny Franco's leadership. With more voters than electors, Franco was affirmed as Head of State. Prince Juan Carlos was appointed as Franco's official successor in 1970, with Admiral Luis Carrero Blanco being the unofficial successor. Carrero Blanco was assassinated in 1973 by ETA. Franco died in November 1975.

== History ==
=== Pre-Francoism period ===
Pablo Iglesias founded Unión General de Trabajadores (UGT) on 12 August 1888 in Barcelona as a trade union affiliate to his socialist party, PSOE, that he had founded in Madrid in 1879. Early growth for UGT was slowed as it was in competition with an anarchist trade union that focused on reaching out to Spain's working class. UGT's connection with PSOE also gave the union a rigid Marxist ideology coupled with anti-clericalism. This was sometimes difficult for Spain's small industrial working class population who had many other left-wing political options to choose from. In 1921, a split developed inside PSOE which resulted in the creation of Partido Comunista Española (PCE). Despite this, during the 1920s the party continued to grow and was the largest one in the country by 1931 when the Second Republic was founded.

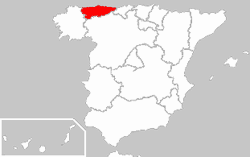
Location of Asturias, Spain, where a major mining strike took place in 1932.

Women were involved in UGT during the 1930s, playing important roles in events like the Asturian miners' strike of 1934. The strike was one of the first major conflicts of the Second Republic, when workers' militias seized control of the mines in Asturias. Originally planned as a nationwide strike, the workers collective action only really took place in Asturias. Some women were involved in propaganda and others in assisting the miners. After the government quelled the insurrection by bringing in Moroccan legionaries, some 30,000 people found themselves in prison and another 1,000 were put into graves. A large number of those put into prison were women. Women also played an advocacy role in trying to see their husbands and male relatives released. Among the UGT women involved in the strike was María Lacrampe, who had joined the union in 1932.

Near the end of 1931, workers at a shoe factor in the village of Arnedo near Logroño were fired because they were members of Unión General de Trabajadores (UGT). Villagers decided to protest their firing outside the townhall, and were fired upon for no discernible reason by the Guardia Civil. Four women, a child and a male worker were killed, while another thirty were injured.

In this period, major unions like UGT and Confederación Nacional del trabajo (CNT) ignored specific needs of women, including maternity leave, childcare provisions and equal pay; they instead focused on general needs or needs of men in the workforces they represented. Only 4% of UGT's membership was female by 1932.

=== Civil War period (1936 - 1939) ===
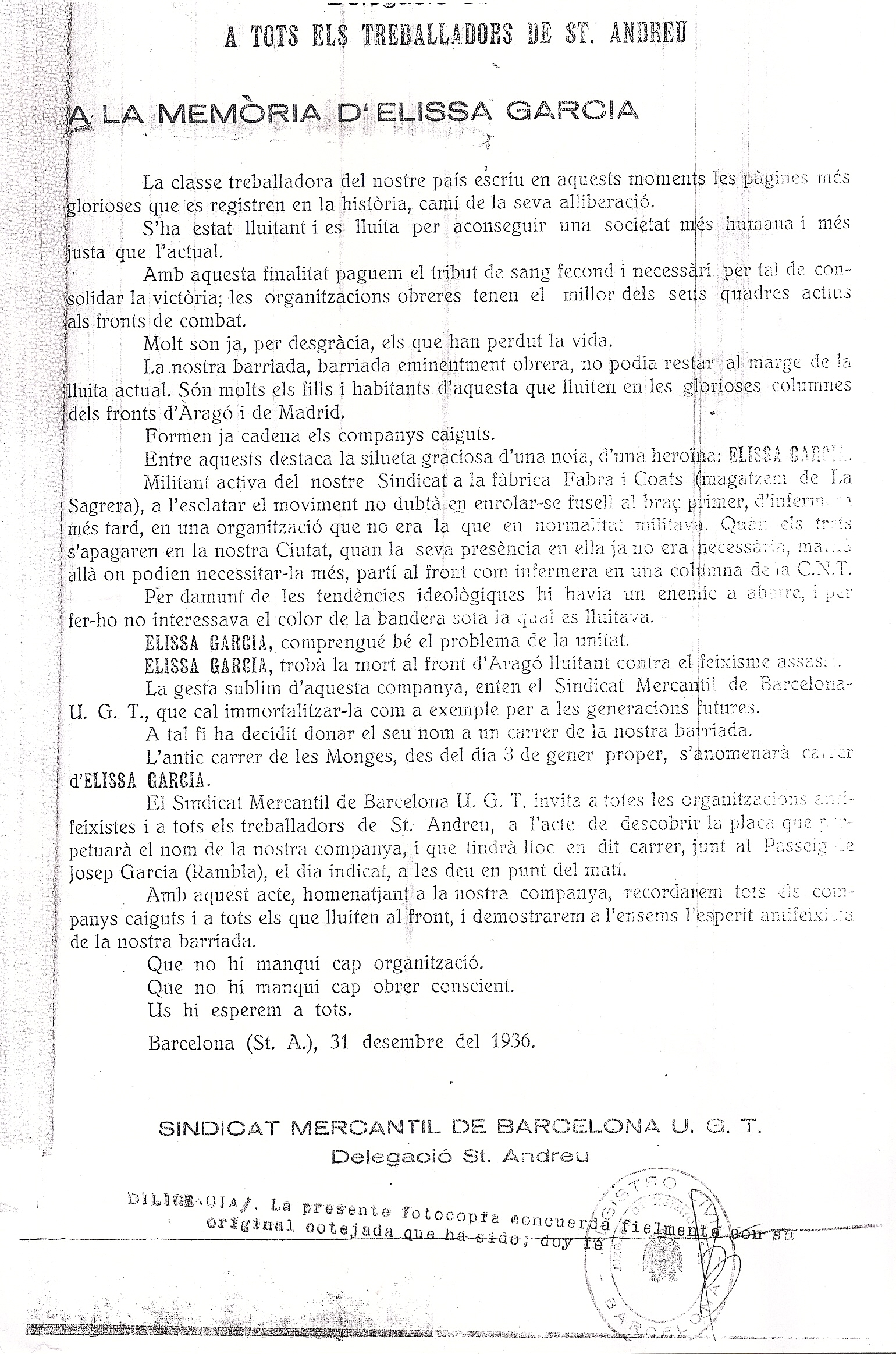
Note in memory of María Elisa Gracía Saez, published by UGT in December 1936 following her death in combat.

UGT leader Francisco Largo Caballero served as Spain's Prime Minister from 1936 to 1937. UGT and PSOE were both banned by Franco in 1938. In November 1937, María Lacrampe became the secretary of the Asociación Socialista de Madrid. As part of her work, she assisted in bringing Spanish Republican children into exile in Belgium. Claudina García Perez served as a member of UGT's Executive Committee from October 1937 to April 1939.

Most of the militias that were created during the immediate outbreak of the Civil War came from civil society groups like trade unions and political parties. CNT, UGT and other unions stepped in to provide logistical support for many of these militias. Aragón UGT militant María Elisa García Saez was killed in combat in the mountains of Múgica on 9 May 1937.

=== Post Civil War period (1939 - 1945) ===
The Franco regime confiscated all UGT property and other assets, starting in the Civil War and continuing into their early period of governance. Around the start of the War, UGT owned more than 1,100 properties in support of their activities of supporting Spanish workers, including providing relief services and assisting mutual aid societies.

Many members of UGT went into exile and the group had to rely on international support as a consequence of domestic repression. Oran, Algeria would receive around 7,000 members of PSOE and UGT who fled into exile as a result of the Spanish Civil War. UGT and PSOE party member Selina Asenjo Puello went into exile in Argentina after 12 years in France. María Lejárraga also spent time in exile in many European and South American countries.

Women who were affiliated with UGT were disappeared during the early Francoist period. UGT members also went to prison in the immediate post-Civil War period, where found themselves facing deplorable conditions. During 1939, conditions in prison for children of mothers imprisoned for political offenses were awful. In the Las Ventas prison, an average of eight children died a day as a result of lack of food an unhygienic conditions.

PSOE and UGT militant Ángeles García Ortega was sent to prison for three years in 1939. At the conclusion of the war, María Lacrampe unsuccessfully tried to escape via boat by claiming she was a French citizen. By June 1939, she was in the Las Ventas Prison in Madrid, where she used her time to work as a nurse assisting children of other female prisoners. She would also be present right before many women were put to death, with many of these women offering her their last testimonies. Because of her political involvement, Dolores Bañares Villanueva went to Las Ventas Prison in Madrid on 28 April 1939, where a court martial on 12 June 1940 gave the 39-year-old a twelve-year prison sentence. She was released from an Avila prison on 9 January 1941. PSOE and UGT militant Pilar Pascual was arrested in March 1939 in Yecla, Murcia for writing an article about socialism. Sentenced to death, she would spend time in prison in Yelca, Murcia and Las Ventas in Madrid after her conviction was commuted. After leaving prison, she rejoined PSOE and was active with the organization until she died. Ángeles Malonda was one of the UGT women imprisoned during the Franco regime as a result of her involvement with the union during the Civil War. PSOE and UGT militant María Añó was involved in clandestine PSOE organizations, and would be sent to prison several times as a result of her political activities. By May 1939, when the Spanish Civil War was officially over, Claudina García Perez was in the Las Ventas Prison in Madrid. The case against her was dismissed in 1940, and she was released from prison.

Wives of UGT members also found themselves subject to harassment in Francoist Spain. They could lose their jobs, and have the state take away their children, forcing them into internal exile. Teachers were a group particularly repressed during this period. In the Basque Country, following the Nationalist seizing control of the area, women found themselves being investigated by the new regime. In Biscay, over 300 different women were investigated in this period. Many were also imprisoned. They were subject to scrutiny because people accused them of being involved with or having sympathies for groups like PCE, PSOE, UGT, Partido Nacionalista Vasco (PNV), and Emakume Abertzaleen Batzak.

Feminism and socialism continued to have a fraught relationship during the early Francoist period.

=== 1940s ===
==== Interior ====
Following the end of the Spanish Civil War, the UGT Executive Committee officially convened abroad with no domestic body until 1943. In 1943, Claudina García Perez was invited to serve in on the interior Executive Commission. She would also on the PSOE First and Second Executive Commission in the same period. Franco's government spied on her and persecuted her, before hunting her down with the intention of arresting her. García Perez then fled to exile in France in December 1946. She then moved to Mexico in February 1948.

Socialist women worked as liaisons or as messengers for clandestine PSOE and UGT activities. Some were sent to prison for many years as a result. Socialist women played an important role in Asturias by doing clandestine work, such as coordinating between cells, supporting covert strike actions and taking over roles left vacant because male leaders were incarcerated.

PSOE and UGT militant Julia Vigre played a central role in organizing clandestine union and party activities. She went to prison several times as a result. María Lacrampe was released in 1943. Victoria Zárate Zurita had been a member of the executive committee of the UGT aligned Federación de Trabajadores de la Enseñanza (FETE). She was arrested and savagely tortured while in prison. Valencia FETE executive committee member Ángela Semper was imprisoned from the end of the Civil War until 1944. Neither woman managed to escape Spain.

Julia Vigre was released from prison in 1943, and got back into contact with members of the UGT and PSOE Executive Committees. She developed a clandestine contact network inside Spanish prisons and with militant male Spanish activities in exile in Toulouse. She then facilitated clandestine communications between the two groups. She was re-arrested in 1945 before being freed against in 1948. Upon her release from prison, she went into hiding but continued her work in some Madrid based UGT and PSOE executive committees. She became involved with Agrupación Socialista Madrileña, and collaborated with another female militant socialist, Carmen Guelin. The work of the pair was critical in establishing the “malla de cristal”, a network that allowed communication between imprisoned socialist militants with their brethren in exile.

In the Region of Murcia, the first union led strike was led by picadoras del esparto women. Coordinating between former CNT and UGT members, they managed to get work stopped in three factories. In 1946, women political prisoners in Madrid's Las Ventas prison held a hunger strike to protest the poor quality of food they were provided. Women from socialist, communist and anarchist organizations came together behind bars to coordinate the strike. While they were successful in seeing food quality improved, prison officials subsequently reorganized the prison population to prevent further political collaboration within the confines of the prison.

==== Exterior ====
In 1942, Spanish Republican groups in exile met in Mexico, forming the Unión Democrática Española (UDE). Participants included PSOE, UGT, Izquierda Republicana (IR), Unión Republicana (UR), Partido Republicano Federal (PRF), Unió de Rabassaires and Aliança Nacional de Catalunya (ANC). Partido Comunista Española (PCE) was excluded as communists were out of favor following the end of the Spanish Civil War. The goal of the meeting was to establish an alternative Juan Negrín led government abroad in opposition to Franco. Agrupación de Socialistas Asturianos en México member Purificación Tomás would play an important role among socialist women in Mexico in the 1940s and 1950s. She was affiliated with the UGT affiliated exile group Círculo Pablo Iglesias.

PSOE, UGT, PCE, CNT, Juventudes Socialistas de España (JSE), Movimiento Libertario Español (MLE) and the Moviment Socialista de Catalunya (MSC) continued their struggle in exile. From 1944 to 1960, the French city of Toulouse served as a major publishing hub for many of these organization's home in exile. The city of Toulouse itself would see around 40,000 exiles from these groups settle permanently in the city. Carmen García Bloise was the daughter of a Spanish PSOE exile, arriving in Paris in 1948 with a family that had been in exile since 1939. Santander local Dolores Rosada de Miranda was a UGT member forced into exile as a result of the Spanish Civil War. She remained active in the UGT de Castelsarrasin (Tarn et Garonne), before dying in France in January 1948.

=== 1950s ===
During the 1950s and 1960s, neither UGT nor PSOE put much consideration into political ideologies and practices related to improving the lives of women. Unlike other European countries where parties held control over unions, PSOE had very little leverage over UGT in the 1940s, 1950s and 1960s despite a large overlap in leadership.

Carmen García Bloise joined Juventudes Socialistas in 1952. Following the death of PSOE leader Tomás Centeno in prison in 1953, the PSOE Executive Committee and broader leadership were largely destroyed. Starting in the 1950s, Josefina Arrillaga Lansorena, a lawyer, began attending clandestine socialist meetings in Madrid. She became involved with Antonio Amat, who wanted to replace the dead Tomás Centeno in order to reconstruct both UGT and PSOE.

From 1957 to 1962, the Franco regime faced labor strikes in Asturias, with the biggest in Pozo María Luisa. Sindicato de los Obreros Mineros de Asturias (SOMA) had its greatest strength in this region, with socialist and communist women leading the organization of strikes on 23 March 1957. They organized in two locations, including the esplanade of Pozo María Luisa and at the highway connecting Oviedo with Campo de Caso. Their actions would serve as a blueprint for future strikes at the Nalón and Caudal mining basins.

In 1958, Josefina Arrillaga and José Federico de Carvajal created a Spain based a UGT Lawyers' Office, which allowed the organization to provide legal services to many people including Antonio Alonso Baño, Luis Castillo Almena, Carlos Zayas and María Luisa Suárez Roldán. PSOE and UGT were almost decapitated in 1958 following a police arrest of many of the leading figures of the movement from Asturias, Basque Country and Madrid. Antonio Amat was among those arrested. He was represented by Josefina Arrillaga Lansorena. While Amat was in prison, Josefina Arrillaga Lansorena took control of the PSOE party apparatus. One of the most important things Arrillaga Lansorena did was establish a relationship with the socialist backed Asturian miners. Another important thing she did was make contact with foreign newspapers including Britain's The Times, the American Associated Press, and the French Agence France-Presse where she provided a different perspective on the realities of Francoist Spain.

In November 1958, there were a large number of raids conducted by the Spanish state that saw many people arrested and sent to prison around the whole of Spain. People picked up in this period would include many women involved with the miners strike in Asturias earlier in the year. Many of the women imprisoned as a consequence of the raid would go on to play leading roles in the Spanish socialist community of the 1960s. Among those arrested was Josefina Arrillaga Lansorena.

=== 1960s ===
==== Interior ====
Socialist Unión General de Trabajadores and Communist Comisiones Obreras were the two leading underground clandestine unions during the 1960s and 1970s. Women were involved with UGT as part of their opposition to the regime.

Carmen Romero and Felipe González met at university in Seville, where both were already involved in anti-Francoist militancy. On 17 July 1969, the couple were civilly married by proxy as Felipe González was in Bordeaux, only returning on 18 July for a religious ceremony. The couple had their honeymoon in France so Felipe González could attend a Socialist Youth meeting in Toulouse. Returning from their honeymoon, Carmen Romero set up a house in 1969 which later became the headquarters for the Federación Española de Trabajadores de la Enseñanza de UGT at calle Espinosa and Cárcel in Seville. By 1970, Carmen Romero was working as a teacher.

UGT militant Manuela Moreno spent time in prisons in Caspe, Torrero and Barbastro because of her membership in UGT. Her longest sentence resulted in her not leaving prison until 1962 because she was found guilty of serving as a liaison to Aragon guerrillas.

Carmen Muriana started working as a clothing store salesperson in the early 1960s, before taking a job in a wholesale drugstore. It was in the latter position that she became involved with labor organization. In 1969, Carmen Muriana immigrated to London, working in a number of jobs including waitress and hotel receptionists. It was in London that she first began to have contact with anti-Francoists. She returned home to Madrid for Christmas on holiday that year, witnessing confrontations between the regime and opponents as a result of the Burgos process, which saw people protesting the sixteen members of ETA given a death sentence after being accused of murdering three people.

==== Exterior ====
Carmen García Bloise was one of the female leaders inside PSOE during the 1960s. She believed that PSOE and UGT needed to be governed from inside Spain, not from the exterior. Along with others in the informal Paris group, she believed that militants inside Spain should be given greater weight and consideration inside PSOE and UGT. Her position closely aligned her with ASO. Carmen García Bloise was delegate for the Section of Paris at the VIII UGT Congress in 1962, led the Secretariado Femenino from February 1965 to August 1970, and was member of the Committee of Formation of the Militant from 1966 to 1969.

==== Interior - exterior conflicts ====
By 1959, divisions had emerged between socialist elements in the Spanish interior and those in leadership in Toulouse in the exterior. Josefina Arrillaga was at the center of this battle for the heart of PSOE and UGT. She had been serving at the primary contact with Toulouse but, on 12 April 1960, she was dismissed from this role. Despite her dismissal, Josefina Arrillaga still played a key role in facilitating clandestine communications between Toulouse and key jailed socialist figures in Spain's interior. Her role would see the November 1961 trial of seven Basque nationalists attended by the British journalist and Labour MP Ernest Davies as well as Christian Democrat Right leader José Maria Gil Robles, and the secretary of the Christian Democrat Left. Josefina Arrillaga would continue to develop her contact network in 1961 to aid in the socialist cause. New contacts would include Amnesty International founder Peter Benenson, Fritz Erler of the German SPD, German metalworks union IG Metall, and UGT members like Manuel Fernández-Montesinos living in exile in Germany.

On 21 May 1962, León Ramos informed the Spanish Democrats Defence Committee (SDDC) that Amat, Josefine Arillaga and Vicente Girbau were trying to destroy PSOE from within and were actively collaborating with the communist. The SDDC was a PSOE and British Labour Party working group. The British Labour party decided to maintain contact with all involved as a 1959 party rule dictated they not become involved in internal Spanish party squabbling.

Madrid based Josefina Arrillaga and Manuel Fernández-Montesinos would further split from the Toulouse group over their support of the creation of the Alianza Sindical Obrera (ASO), which drew heavily from UGT membership and advocated for a radical change in approach for the movement in the interior. Arrillaga would support World Federation of Trade Unions (WFTU) participation by ASO, attending several of WFTU's international congresses. Arrillaga's participation internationally ended the monopoly held by Toulouse of representing PSOE internationally and as Spain's primary free trade unionist organization. Josefina Arrillaga later immigrated to Germany in 1966, which along with the arrest of figures like Manuel Fernández Montesinos and the dissolution of the Madrid PSOE group, saw ASO go into the decline.

The arrest of the core of the Madrid group including Fernández-Montesinos, Nuero and Nogués left Josefina Arrillaga uncertain. The Lawyers Group could not overcome their loss. The remaining members Madrid group still had to deal with tensions from leadership in Toulouse. Consequently, Arrillaga felt she could not overcome these difficulties and left for Germany in 1966 and became politically inactive.

=== Francoist 1970s (1970 - 1975) ===
1971 British documentary about Spain that shows women, class problems and issues of Basque nationalists.

During the early 1970s, Asturian socialists and militants played a critical role in providing a renewal for PSOE and UGT's leadership. Ludivina García Arias and José Luis Rodríguez Vigil played a critical role in rebuilding UGT in Oveido during the 1970s. Encarna Vega and Ludivina García Arias both spent time in hiding. They worked to coordinate their activities to promote UGT and PSOE in Oviedo during the early 1970s.

Carmen García Bloise held several positions in UGT in the early 1970s, including being part of the National Committee as substitute member representing the 7th area (Seine) from 1971 to 1973, a member of the Committee of Formation of the Militant from 1971 to 1975, and a delegate of the Departmental Group of Seine to the XI UGT Congress in exile in 1971. In October 1975, Carmen García Bloise and her husband Rafael Robledo moved to Madrid.

In 1971, with the help of Asturian unionists and militants, UGT leadership moved from the exterior to the interior. The XI Congreso of UGT in 1971 resulted in a rupture inside UGT as a result of divisions over who should govern the organization. The interior side was led by an executive committee formed by Nicolás Redondo, Eduardo López Albizu, Agustín González, Enrique Múgica, Pablo Castellano and Felipe González from the interior, and Antonio García Duarte, José Mata, Paulino Barrabés, Manuel Simón, and Juan Iglesias from the exterior. They were supported in their efforts by Carmen García Bloise, who at the time was working as an accountant for Renault in Paris.

Carmen Muriana returned to London in January 1970, but quickly made the decision to permanently return home to Madrid and takes a job in a marble shop. Fired because she became pregnant, she worked with her union Sindicato Vertical to protest the dismissal and was compensated for wrongful termination. Carmen Muriana worked for ODAG and then Standard Eléctrica y Plata Meneses during the 1970s. Her work put her into contact with a number of clandestine organizations including Liga Comunista Revolucionaria, CCOO and PCE. With them, she participated in strike actions and demonstrations. She also distributed union propaganda. Carmen Muriana took control of the Women's Section of the UGT in the 1970s.

Carmen Romero moved with her husband to Madrid in 1974 after he became the Secretary General of PSOE. She took up teaching in Madrid and became more active in UGT's Federación Española de Trabajadores de la Enseñanza . Josefina Arrillaga returned to Spain in 1974. Matilde Fernández joined UGT in the last years of the dictatorship.

=== Democratic transition 1970s (1976-1985) ===
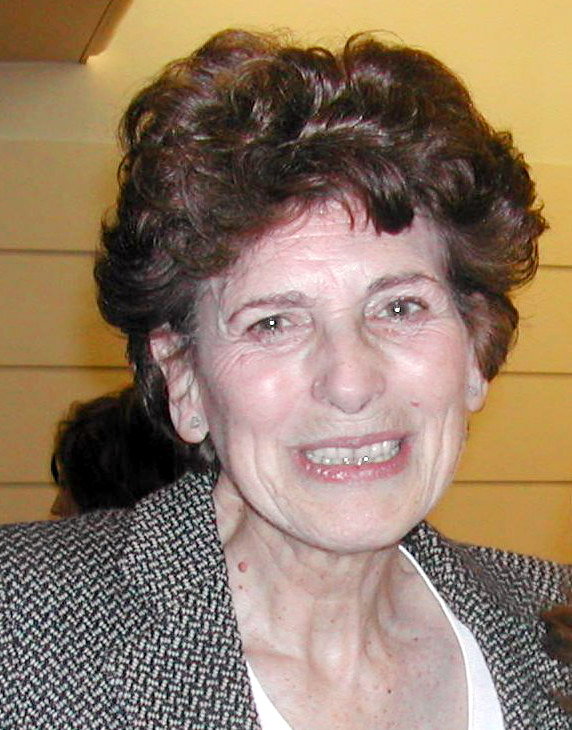
Teresa Revilla in January 2006.

The involvement of women in the movement assisted in a push for more democratic ideals that would come about in the 1970s, which would also see feminism merge politically with the movement as part of individual and collective goals towards creating a more democratic society following the death of Franco. In the transition period, HOAC, JEC, Comisiones Obreras and UGT were largely focused on the creation of a new Spanish democracy. While female only labor associations had existed underground in the Francoist period, these organizations and the specific needs of women they espoused were largely ignored by HOAC, JEC, Comisiones Obreras and UGT. Despite this, in the Constituent Assembly that drafted the 1978 Spanish constitution, only 27 members were women. The final drawing up of the Spanish constitution had no women involved in the process. The only woman involved in the 39 member commission that debated the constitutional process was UGT's María Teresa Revilla.

Revilla said of the process, "The Constitution was a fundamental and decisive leap for women in Spain. From there, the inequalities in the laws began to be corrected. The woman really began to be able to be what she herself achieved with her effort (...) I believe that none of the deputies of that constituent legislature were satisfied with the regulation of the Crown in regard to the order of succession. How was it then possible to discriminate against women in flagrant contradiction with what was said in article 14 of the Constitution itself? Even today I can not find sufficient reason ."

When the UGT was still semi-clandestine in 1976, Ludivina García Arias was elected at XXX UGT Congress in Madrid in April as UGT Secretary of Emigration of the Executive Commission. Carmen García Bloise attended the same congress, representing the Section of Grenoble (Isère). In 1976, Carmen Muriana joined UGT. In 1977, because of an amnesty, she got her job at Standard back. In UGT elections the following year, she was elected to the Comité de Empresa, and would go on to hold many more leadership positions in UGT. In 1977, Carmen Romero became UGT's Executive Education Committee Press Secretary. Josefina Arrillaga would briefly rejoin PSOE during the transition period.

The Primeras Jornadas de la Mujer were held in the Basque Country from 8–11 December 1978. The Primeras Jornadas de la Mujer were held in Granada in 1979. At both, the issue of dual militancy was discussed by women trade unionists and political party members in attendance. For many of these women, even though they were able to work, their husbands often demanded they do traditional women's housework and childcare because the husband said his unionist and political activities were more important than hers. This left many women feeling insecure in their activism.

=== Democratic Spain (1985 - present) ===
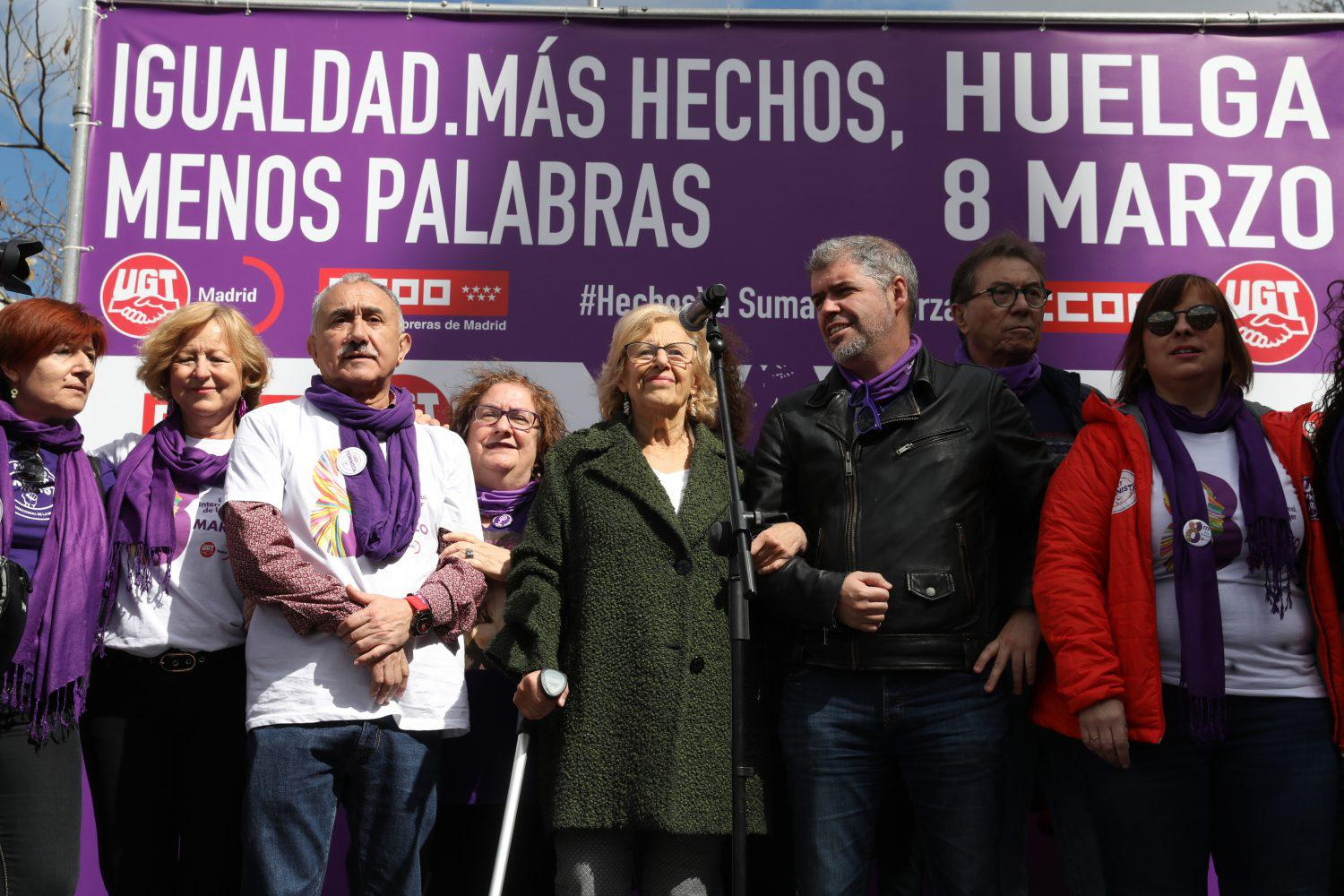
Madrid mayor Manuela Carmena on 8 March 2018 at a UGT and CCOO women's general strike event commemorating International Women's Day.

It was not until 2019 that UGT declared itself as an explicitly feminist union. On 8 March 2019, UGT Deputy Secretary General Cristina Antoñanzas was quoted as saying that UGT "has always fought against discrimination and the distribution of wealth. We have always done it, beyond that some see the fight for equality as a fad now. UGT has been, is and will always be a feminist." She went on to say, "UGT has not declared itself a feminist until today. Since our foundation, more than 130 years ago, the union was already clear that the work of women had to be paid equal to that of men and that women had to have more positions of responsibility." In 2018, an exhibition was held in Córdoba specifically to honor those women involved with UGT who were repressed in the Civil War and Francoist period. One of the purposes of the exhibit was to restore the dignity of victims as victims of repression.

Carmen García Bloise died on 13 July 1994 as the result of a failed liver transplant.
