= Divorce in Francoist Spain and the democratic transition =

Divorce in Francoist Spain and the democratic transition were illegal. While divorce had been legal during the Second Spanish Republic, Franco began to overturn these laws by March 1938. In 1945, the legislation embodied in his Fuero de los Españoles established that marriage was an indissoluble union. Divorce was still possible in Spain through the Catholic Church as a result of Pauline privilege or petrino. Marriages, primarily for the rich, could also be annulled through ecclesiastical tribunals. The Catholic Church was vigorously opposed to divorces, whether on religious or civil grounds.

The relationship between Spanish marriage and Catholic Canonical Law would fundamentally change following the death of Franco with the creation of the 1978 Spanish constitution. This came about because of the demands of the Spanish left, which finally gained representation after a long wait as a consequence of the 1977 Spanish general election. The left had run on a platform of supporting divorce. Compromises were required so that canonical law could no longer dictate the country's marriage laws. Because of divisions in the Government, the issue of the legalization of divorce itself was delayed until 1981. That year, the divorce law passed, becoming official on 7 July 1981. To appease the Church, the process was designed to make it difficult for a divorce to be granted. The first divorce was granted to Julia Ibars on 7 September 1981 in Santander. Express divorce would be many years off.

== History ==
=== Francoist period (1939–1975) ===
The concept of civil marriage did not form part of Spanish law until 18 June 1870. Prior to this, all marriages in the country were religious ones, established under law with Philip II's July 1564 Royal Decree, based on the Council of Trent. In March 1938, Franco suppressed the laws regarding civil matrimony and divorce that had been enacted by the Second Republic. On 2 March 1938, Franco declared that in all Nationalist territories lawsuits seeking legal separation or divorce were to be suspended. On 22 April 1939, an order was made that all canonical marriages carried out by the Republic be registered as such with the Francoist government.

Franco repealed the 1932 Divorce Law of the Second Republic on 23 September 1939. The 23 September 1939 law provided that in cases when women requested and received divorces as a result of allegations of mistreatment, the husband could force the wife to remarry. In all cases, the divorce request would automatically be annulled if one party asked for the marriage to be reconstituted. They had to only state a "desire to reconstitute their legitimate home, or simply, to reassure their conscience as believers". In cases where both former spouses wished to remain divorced, neither could remarry until one of them had died. Marriages that had taken place civilly between 1932 and 1939 were annulled. Couples were forced to remarry, and could only do so if both partners were Catholics.

On 10 March 1941, a Ministerial Order was issued, allowing couples to have civil marriages. This was a new interpretation of EDL 1889/1 and an amendment of Article 42 of the Civil Code. Civil marriages could take place if both partners could provide a justification for not being Catholic and for not wishing to have a Catholic marriage. Consequently, few civil marriages took place, as such marriages were considered by the Government and society to be a rejection of the Spanish state.

The 1945 Fuero de los Españoles established that marriage was an indissoluble union. The 26 October 1956 Decree of the Modification of the Regulation of the Civil Registry of 1870 was a result of the Spanish and Vatican 27 August 1953 Concordat. It resulted in the full recognition of civil marriage within Canonical Law, harmonizing civil marriages with Catholic marriages. It also meant all separation procedures had to be handled through ecclesiastical courts. The Law of 8 June 1957 of the Civil Registry saw further attempts to harmonize Canonical Law with Spain's civil code as it related to the requirements of civil marriage. The reforms in 1958 under Article 42 of the Civil Code, EDL 1889/1, continued this process. Caserón de la Goleta, the prison for women in Málaga, held thousands of women over its history. Women found themselves there for a wide variety of offenses including infidelity, divorce or lesbian relationships.

Up until the mid-1960s, Franco's legal system gave husbands near total control over their wives. This did not change until women started playing a more central role in the Spanish economy. The 28 June 1967 Law on Religious Freedom impacted marriage rights in Spain. It resulted from new Catholic doctrines following the Second Vatican Council, including a declaration that "the right of freedom in religious matters is really based on the dignity of the human person [...] This right to freedom religious is to be recognized in the legal order of society, in such a way that it becomes a civil right." Article 42 was modified to state, "Civil marriage is authorized when none of the parties professes the Catholic religion, without prejudice to the rites or ceremonies of the different non-Catholic confessions, which may be held before or after civil marriage as long as they do not violate morals or good customs." The 22 May 1969 Decree of the Regulation of the Civil Registry made it easier for couples to marry without the need to prove they were not practicing Roman Catholics.

Ana María Pérez del Campo publicly announced her intention to separate from her husband of four years starting in 1961. Eight years later, in 1969, she started the process to try to separate from him legally. It took many years before she succeeded. In 1974, when Franco was still alive, she founded the National Federation of Associations of Separated and Divorced Women to teach women about their rights under the law, and the rights still lacked. Her efforts to separate from her husband were not normal at the time, but it was not unusual either that many couples separated by simply moving into separate homes.

During the Franco period, there was the concept of "hidden divorce". These were declarations by the Spanish Catholic Church that a marriage was nullified. They were different from the ecclesiastical courts' dissolution of marriages. These divorces could come about because of Pauline privilege, where the church nullified a marriage because neither spouse had been baptized. Marriages could also be nullified if one spouse was baptized and the other not, as the Catholic spouse could not live as a faithful Catholic because of their spouse's lack of faith. As a result, the Catholic spouse could remarry another Catholic with whom they could live peacefully. Another way a Catholic divorce could occur was known as petrino, a similar formula created by Pope Pius XI. A divorce could be granted if the married coupled included a Catholic and non-Catholic spouse, where the Catholic spouse wanted the separation in order to marry a Catholic.

Divorce in the late Franco period and early transition was available via ecclesiastical tribunals. These courts could nullify marriage for a fee. Consequently, they were mostly available only to the rich, the most famous instance of this nullification involving Isabel Preysler and Carmencita Martínez Bordiú. The Civil Courts were only involved in separation procedures at the provisional level. The Catholic Church was actively opposed to civil divorce in the mid and late 1970s.

=== Democratic transition period (1975—1982) ===
For many people in Spain, the period that marked the start of Spain's transition to democracy began on 20 December 1973 with the death of Luis Carrero Blanco as a result of an attack by ETA. The end of the transition period is generally considered to be 1982, with the elections that saw the PSOE come to power. Franco died in November 1975. Ahead of the first democratic elections, in 1977 following Franco's death, Spaniards overwhelmingly supported the legalizing of divorce. Catholic canonical law, which applied in Francoist Spain and during the democratic transition, did not end until the Spanish constitution was adopted in 1978.

As a European Christian Democratic party, the UCD opposed the legalization of divorce, believing in what they saw as "the preservation of the family". By contrast, the PSOE supported its legalization. Most of the independents in 1976-1977 were right wing, with the primary exception of Adolfo Suárez who supported the legalization of divorce. Ahead of the 1977 elections, UCD did not put forth a coherent party policy on major social issues of the day in order to try to broaden the party's appeal to Spanish voters, who had largely been apolitical as a result of regime constraints on political activity. Their primary goal in the 1977 elections was to create a break with the past dictatorship by means of reform.

The Cortes of 1977 had to try to find a way to navigate the demands of the newly liberated left, who wanted to see reforms like the legalization of abortion and divorce, with the Catholic Church who opposed both. The last time the state had been in conflict with the Church was in 1931, with the founding of the Second Republic and no one wanted to see renewed political violence.

On 22 May 1978, four UCD deputies and four Socialist deputies met at a restaurant in Madrid to try to find a compromise on major issues as they were addressed in the constitution. These issues included divorce and abortion. The UCD deputies went into the meeting having consulted their PCE and Catalan counterparts. All agreed this was a necessary step to avoid a breakdown in the process of writing a new constitution. Allianz Popular was left out of the discussions. One of the reasons UCD went into decline after the 1977 elections was that the party was forced to take positions on major issues of the day, including divorce, abortion and the use of public money for private schools.

In the first draft of the constitution, both PSOE and PCE supported the legalization of abortion and divorce. UCD supported the legalization of divorce, but only at a later date. UCD opposed the legalization of abortion. Coalición Popular opposed both the legalization of abortion and divorce. A compromise was reached on divorce that would see the issue addressed in later legislation through the text of Article 32.2 which stated, "The law will regulate the forms of matrimony… [and] the causes of separation and dissolution." No agreement could be reached over abortion, and Article 15 had the ambiguous text "todos tienan derecho a la vida" (all have the right to life) at the insistence of UCD and Coalición Popular so the door could be left open to make abortion illegal.

The November 1979 XXXII Conferencia Episcopal advised that the Church did not want to interfere in the ability of legislators to conduct their business. Nonetheless, they stated that legislators considering legalization of divorce should be allowed to do so only in specific circumstances. These included that divorce was not a right, mutual consent could not be allowed, and divorce should only occur when there was no other remedy for the marriage. The Ministry of Justice asked the Catholic Church to stop meddling, and the Catholic Church had to accept that they would not have any involvement in civil marriages and civil divorces. Monsignor Jubany from Barcelona made a final request in meeting with members of the Cortes, namely that divorce should be rendered costly as a means of prevention.

Minister of Justice Francisco Fernández successfully fought the inclusion of a hardness clause in divorce legislation. The clause would have allowed judges to prevent a divorce if it was determined that allowing a divorce would cause exceptionally serious damage to the other spouse or to any children in the marriage.

The issue of passing divorce legislation came to a head in 1981, pitting the Catholic Church more visibly against Spain's leftist elements. The new Pope, John Paul II, appointed a conservative Nuncio in Madrid who would speak much more openly about his political opposition to government reforms on the issue. At the same time UCD Minister of Justice Iñigo Cavero was replaced by the more liberal social democrat Francisco Fernández Ordóñez who altered the text of the proposed bill in order to make it be more liberal, despite opposition from Christian democrats who preferred Fernández Ordóñez's text. Fernández Ordoñez famously announced during the debate, "We cannot prevent marriages breaking up, but we can prevent suffering from broken marriages." (Spanish: "No podemos impedir que los matrimonios se rompan pero sí podemos impedir el sufrimiento de los matrimonios rotos".) Because of his support for the passage of the law, his fellow ministers asked for his resignation. Ana María Pérez del Campo, the president of a feminist organization, said of the Fernández Ordoñez's actions, "The Church offered fierce resistance. The minister always remained firm and Suarez also. We must thank the UCD the law that was considered in Europe as one of the most progressive and was agreed with us." The divorce issue would split UCD, harming them going into the 1982 elections. The Catholic Church predicted that the passage of the law would result in 500,000 divorces during the first year of legalization.

The divorce law passed the Congreso de Diputados on 22 June 1981 and became official on 7 July 1981. Law 30/1981, the divorce law, passed by a vote of 162 to 128, with seven abstentions. At the time of its passage, the divorce law required cause. This included reasons such as alcoholism, infidelity or abandonment of the home. Spouses were required to undergo a judicial review before being allowed to apply for a divorce. A couple needed not to have been cohabiting for more than a year when they filed. After having the judicial separation, they could then not cohabit for another year. At that stage, the couple were allowed to ask for a divorce. The process was designed to make divorce difficult to obtain. The law entered into force on 9 August 1981. Despite the divorce law making national news, most Spaniards were indifferent to the law's passage.

The first Spanish woman to benefit was Julia Ibars, who was granted a divorce on 7 September 1981 in Santander. She filed for divorce within hours of the adoption of the law. Ibars had a religious divorce granted in April 1980 from the Ecclesiastical Court of Santander, and the couple had no children. She became a media star after a divorce to her marriage with Vidal Gutiérrez was granted. She did not realize at the time how historic her divorce had been. Twenty-nine divorce cases were filed in Barcelona within hours of the law passing. Another three requests were filed in other parts of Catalonia. Numbers were lower in other parts of Spain. On the first day, only two divorce applications were filed in Madrid. None were applied for in Bilbao, Seville, Valladolid and Valencia. Demand rapidly increased in Barcelona, with 1,400 requests for divorce within the first three months of legalization. Barcelona did not set up a Family Court to handle divorce cases until September 1981. Rafael Hueso was the first man in Catalonia to be granted a divorce, legally terminating his relationship with his wife from whom he had been separated for 36 years in mid-October 1981.

Following PSOE gaining power after the 2005 Spanish general elections, the issue of divorce was revisited with in order to facilitate the granting of a divorce. They succeeded in changing the law but obtaining a divorce was still difficult. The concept of "express divorce" was vigorously opposed by the Catholic Church. An easier process would still be many years away.
