= Carmen García Bloise =

Spanish politician (1937–1994)

Member of the Congress of Deputies
- In office 1977 – 13 July 1994
- Succeeded by: María Enedina Álvarez Gayol
- Constituency: Madrid

Personal details
- Born: 19 January 1937 Madrid, Spain
- Died: 13 July 1994 (aged 57) Madrid, Spain
- Party: Spanish Socialist Workers' Party
- Spouse: Rafael Robledo
- Education: French School of Accountants
- Profession: Accountant

Carmen García Bloise (19 January 1937 – 13 July 1994) was a socialist politician and a member of the Spanish Socialist Workers' Party (PSOE). She lived in exile in Paris between 1948 and 1975. Following her return to Spain she was elected as a deputy in the 1977 elections and served at the Congress of Deputies until 1994.

== Early life and education ==
García was born in Madrid on 19 January 1937. In 1948, García and her mother left Spain for Paris where her father, Mariano García Gala, had been living in exile since 1939 after the Spanish Civil War. She had two younger brothers who were born in Paris.

García attended the Technical High School and then obtained a degree in business organization from the School of Accountants.

== Career and activities ==
Following her graduation García worked as chief accountant at the French automobile company Renault from 1957 to 1975. She was also the secretary of the French trade union Workers' Force. She joined both the Unión General de Trabajadores and the PSOE in 1956. She was part of the François Mitterrand's election campaign team in the 1965 French presidential election. She headed the Women's Secretariat of the PSOE from February 1965 to August 1970. She was the member of the PSOE Steering Committee in exile from 1965 to 1970 and was a substitute member of the committee for the Seine region from 1970 to 1972.

García and her husband returned to Madrid in October 1975. She was elected as a deputy for Madrid from the PSOE in the 1977 general elections and was re-elected to the Parliament in the next four elections serving there until her death in 1994. María Enedina Álvarez Gayol succeeded her as the deputy of Madrid at the Parliament. She was elected organizational secretary of the PSOE's federal executive commission in September 1979. From the same date she was part of all federal executive commissions: organization secretary (1979-1984), member (1984-1988) and executive secretary (1988-1994).

== Personal life and death ==
García she married Rafael Robledo de Roa in 1961.

García died at a hospital in Madrid on 13 July 1994 at the age of 57 due to the complications resulted from the second liver transplantation.
