= Ludivina García Arias =

Former Spanish MEP

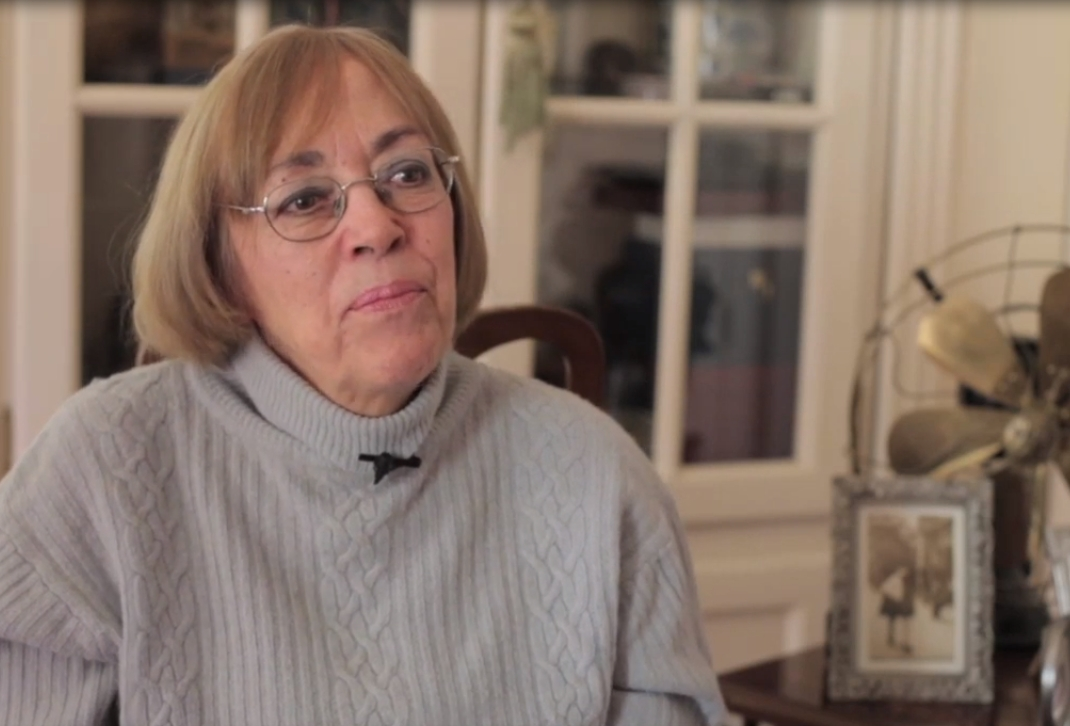
- García Arias in 2019

Member of the Congress of Deputies
- In office 5 April 2000 – 20 January 2004
- Constituency: Asturias
- In office 18 November 1982 – 23 April 1986
- Constituency: Asturias
- In office 23 March 1979 – 31 August 1982
- Constituency: Oviedo

Member of the European Parliament for Spain
- In office 4 July 1987 – 19 July 1999

Personal details
- Born: 13 December 1945 (age 79); Morelia, Michoacán
- Political party: Spanish Socialist Workers' Party (PSOE)
- Education: National Autonomous University of Mexico

Ludivina García Arias (born 13 December 1945) is a Mexican-Spanish politician and member of the Spanish Socialist Workers Party (PSOE). Having emigrated from Mexico to Spain in the 1970s, she was a Member of the Congress of Deputies for Asturias from 1979 to 1986, and from 2000 to 2004. From 1987 until 1999, she was a Member of the European Parliament.

== Life and career ==
Ludivina García Arias was born in December 1945 to Asturian parents in Morelia in the Mexican state of Michoacán. She studied history at the National Autonomous University of Mexico and moved to Spain towards the end of the Francoist dictatorship. She worked as a secondary school teacher.

García Arias joined the PSOE in 1972, and was elected to the Congress of Deputies for Asturias in the 1979 general election. She remained in this office until 1986. In 1987, she was elected to represent Spain at the European Parliament. She had this role until the 1999 European Parliament election. In 2000, she was again elected to the Congress of Deputies. Her political career ended in 2004.
