= Ana María Pérez del Campo =

Spanish lawyer, feminist and writer (born 1936)

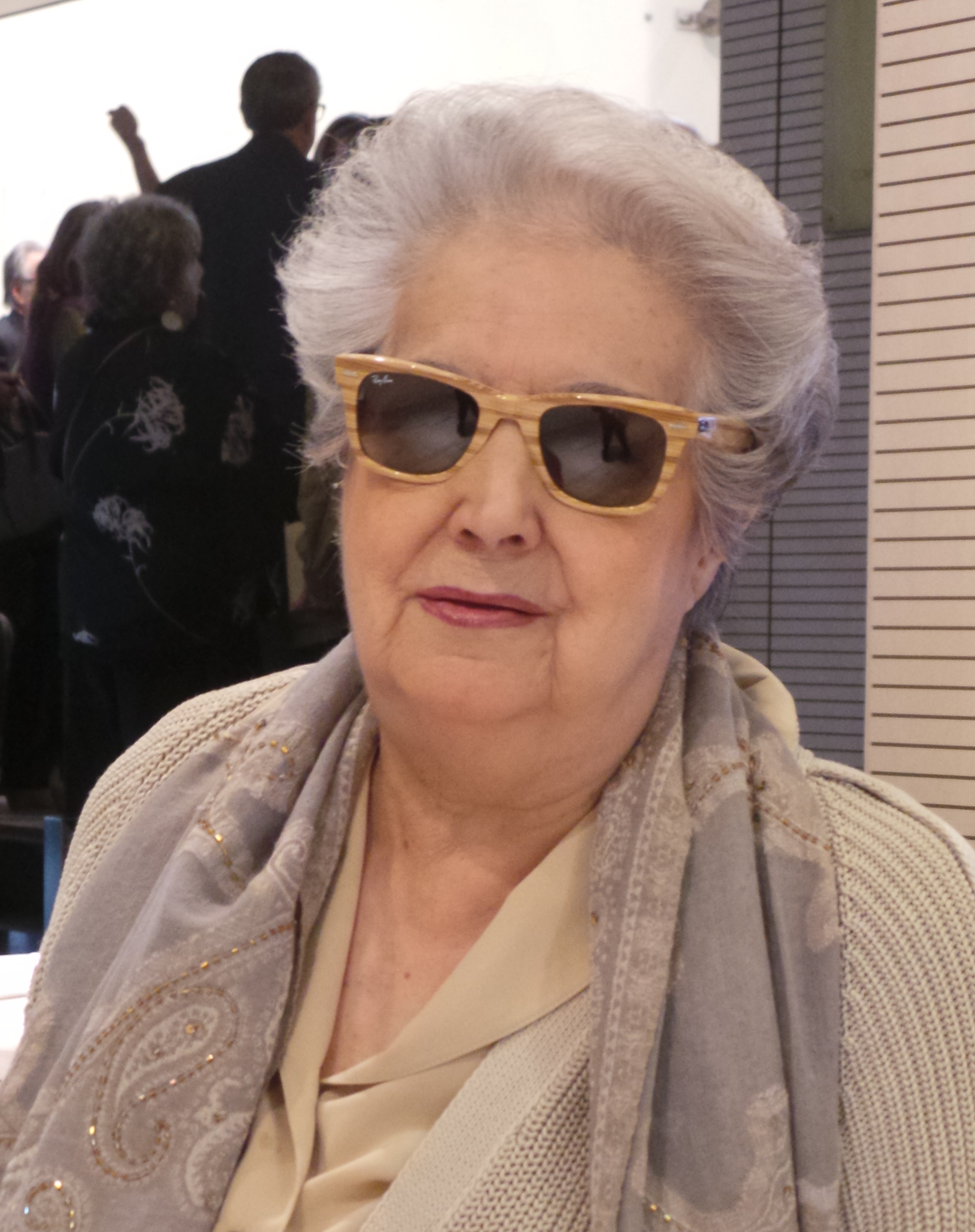
- Ana María Pérez del Campo (2015)
- Born: 19 May 1936 (age 90); Madrid, Spain
- Other name: Ana María Pérez del Campo Noriega
- Occupations: lawyer, writer
- Known for: women's rights
- Notable work: founded Asociación de Mujeres Separadas
- Spouse: m.1956, left 1961

Ana María Pérez del Campo Noriega (born 19 May 1936) is a Spanish lawyer, feminist and writer. She pioneered the struggle for women's rights under Franco and during Spain's transition to democracy. In 1974, she founded and headed the Asociación de Mujeres Separadas Association of Separated Women) at a time when divorce had not yet been legalized and went on to prepare the terms of the 1981 divorce law. She has constantly fought for equal rights for men and women, recently turning to the defence of abused women.

== Biography ==
Born in Madrid on 19 May 1936, she was brought up in a conservative family. She married in 1956 but together with her children she left her husband in 1961 after being seriously victimized both physically and psychologically.

In the late 1960s, together with the historian Mabel Pérez Serrano, she prepared the ground for a movement to defend the rights of women who had been forced to separate from their husbands. In 1974, this led to the establishment of the Asociación de Mujeres Separadas. The same year, she earned a diploma in marriage law from the Comillas Pontifical University. In 1981, she prepared the articles of the new divorce law. After it was passed, the association later changed its name to include "y Divorciada", i.e. divorced women. She has constantly fought for equal rights for men and women, recently turning to the defence of abused women.
