= Childcare in Francoist Spain and the democratic transition =

Childcare in Francoist Spain and the democratic transition was not about the needs of the mother, but about the needs of the state to educate children. While childcare centers had been provided by Republican aligned unions in the Spanish Civil Wars, with the start of the Franco period women were discouraged from participating in the workforce. Instead, they were expected to tend to their children in the home. The 1942 Ley de Sanidad Infantil y Maternal provided some assistance to working mothers, including maternity leave, economic incentives to breastfeed and infant childcare. By 1955, the Franco government offered educational programming for children aged three to five, but this was focused less on the needs of mothers for childcare and more on the desire to provide children with skills and abilities to succeed in later mandatory schooling. By 1970, children aged two to five were officially considered part of the educational system, even if attendance was not mandatory.

Childcare was an aspect of women's rights taken up during the democratic transition period, but it was only a very small aspect with inconsistent demands and little mobilization around the issue. State policies of the past were continued, with increased efforts to provide more pre-school opportunities to support later school success but without considering the needs of working parents. Political parties and unions were generally unconcerned with the needs of working mothers and providing them with state-supported childcare services. Reforms in the area of childcare were still needed after Spain finished its democratic transition.

== History ==
=== Francoist period (1939 - 1975) ===
During the Spanish Civil War, Republican workers unions provided a number of services to assist in the war efforts. One of these was child care services for women working to help their cause. Auxilio Social, a mixed gendered Nationalist organization, also provided childcare services. In the immediate post-war period, the regime put tremendous pressure on women to leave the workforce, take care of their children in their own homes and breastfeed their babies, irrespective of any subsistence level survival actions taken by women.

One of the most important female labor activities in the Francoist period, especially between 1940 and 1970, was childcare. The regime used Sección Femenina and Acción Católica to impose its pro-nationalist policies on Spain through the concept of traditional womanhood, that demanded among other things that women tend to the home and be primary caregivers to their children. This was expected of women, even if they were required to take on extra work inside the home or were able to pay someone to do basic domestic tasks. Men were expected to be in the workforce, providing a steady income that would cover the costs of running the household. There was no differentiation in this period between paid and domestic work for women. Both were viewed as two parts of the same cause for women serving Spanish society.

Working pregnant women had some Government support when it came to childcare as a result of the 1942 Ley de Sanidad Infantil y Maternal. They were given six weeks of "paid rest" after the birth of their child, a cash prize from the Government if they made the choice to breastfeed their child, and a year of childcare services. Despite this, women were not encouraged to work outside the home as it was considered detrimental to the health of their children, with a mortality rate of 63 per 1000 births for housewives compared with 74 for women who worked in the home, and 162 for women who worked outside the home. Women who did breastfeed their babies and who worked outside the home were strongly condemned. The only general exception was widows.

Sección Feminina and Falange provided childcare services during the 1950s and 1960s to women working in the agriculture. Official women's participation in this sector was around 5.5%, but informal participation was much higher, resulting in the need for childcare.

Starting around 1955, the Government created a childcare policy for children aged three to five, with the goal of developing skills and abilities that would enable them to do better in schools. These programs were not identified as childcare in that they were not primarily about relieving mothers of childcare responsibilities so they could participate in the workforce. There were a number of reasons that childcare in the Francoist period was not centered around the needs of working mothers. These included low levels of female participation in the workforce, societal and cultural views that children under the age of three are best taken care of by their mothers, and the dictatorship imposing its concepts of womanhood on the broader population.

The United Nations General Assembly created the Rights of Children document in 1959. This was part of an effort to criminalize neglect of children and those who intentionally endangered children. The 1969 World Congress of Children debated the protection of minors.

The Ley 14/1970 required for the first time that children aged two to six be considered part of the education system, and effectively created educational preschool for two and three year olds, and nursery school for four and five year olds. These programs were not built around the hours that mothers would likely be at work.

=== Democratic transition period (1975 - 1986) ===
Childcare was an aspect of women's rights taken up during the democratic transition period. Starting in 1975, state policy switched to offering more opportunities for children to be enrolled in free state-run educational preschool programs. These classes were for children aged three to five, the three years before the state mandated age of six to start attending school. The childcare programs that the Government focused on had two distinct features. One was that programs for four and five year olds be educational. Many of these programs were run through the Ministry of Education and Culture. There were few comparable programs for children aged three and under. Second was that private childcare facilities had to be approved and regulated by the Government. This, unlike in other western countries, included attempts to regulate private daycare run by people from their homes. None of these programs were focused on the needs of working parents. This was because of a widespread belief that mothers were the best caregivers of their children.

Despite increased feminist interests in childcare as a component of women's rights in the democratic period, feminists were not consistent in their demands and were unable to mobilize around the issue. Feminist groups, feminists inside state institutions and women's sections of Spanish unions differed from their European peers in that they infrequently drove needs for a wide range of childcare services to be offered by the state and did not act as primary supporters of the needs of mothers. When they were working as actors in this area, it was generally on behalf of children and focused on the educational needs of children under the age of six. Major complaints cited the lack of Government-run educational opportunities for children in this age group.

Spanish feminists may have been hesitant to address the issue of motherhood and the needs of mothers for various reasons, the first being that during the dictatorship there was no opportunity for the creation of detailed feminist thinking in a Spanish-specific context. This development of a feminist ideology would only take place during the transition, as feminists developed specific goals that they hoped to see enacted in a new democratic Spain. Second, much of the feminist thinking at the time was inspired by reading the philosophies of feminists from other countries. International feminists in the mid-1970s were largely unconcerned with the concept of motherhood or the care of minor children. Consequently, this did not percolate through internationally influenced Spanish feminist thought. Lastly, Spain was in a dictatorship, where definitions of male and female sexuality were rigidly imposed by the state. Goals in responding specifically to the end of the dictatorship were often about achieving political equality, and less concerned with specific economic issues for women. At the same time, not discussing motherhood was viewed by some as rejecting the dictatorship's definition of womanhood that exclusively defined women in that context.

Some parties on the right like Alianza Popular (now Partido Popular) were open to talking about educational opportunities for young children but were reticent to discuss childcare as a result of their own beliefs in traditional Spanish motherhood, where women were not allowed to participate in the labor market. Centrist parties were also hesitant to discuss the issue, lest they lose their broad base of support. Union of the Democratic Center (UCD) made no reference to childcare in their 1977 electoral campaign. PSOE supported educational programs for children under six in their campaign propaganda, but this was largely part of their program to try to reduce class inequality through education; it was not out of concern for the childcare needs of working mothers.

Unions also generally failed to address the needs of working parents in the transition period. They did not create their own childcare centers. They did not make issues around childcare needs part of any collective bargaining agreements. They did not encourage companies to create their own childcare centers, nor did they encourage them to provide monetary assistance to working parents to pay for private childcare.

While many important reforms were made in the democratic transition, there were areas that still needed work. These included child care, elderly care and higher rates of female unemployment.
