= Movimiento Democrático de Mujeres =

The Movimiento Democrático de Mujeres (MDM; English: Women's Democratic Movement) was an underground feminist organization that was active during the late stages of the Spanish Franco regime in the mid-1970s. The Communist Party of Spain understood the need for a united women's front fighting for the same ideas, so the women of the Communist Party of Spain founded the Movimiento Democrático de Mujeres in 1965. It was led by women such as Dulcinea Bellido, Maruja Cazcarra, Paquita Martín de Isidro, Carmen Rodríguez, and other independent feminists with the aim of building alliances with non-party female activists. The Movimiento Democrático de Mujeres is particularly notable for its contribution to the democratization of Spanish society after the authoritarian Franco period concluded. This article will explore the events in Spanish history preceding the formation of the MDM, the context in which the MDM gained traction and popularity, the specific organizing efforts of MDM activists, and the factors that influenced the MDM's waning influence.

== Overview ==
Founded in 1965, MDM boasted a diverse membership of women of different backgrounds and political affiliations, all united to combat the deprivation of women's rights, the imposition of gender roles, the persistence of patriarchy, and various other issues under Francisco Franco's rule. The organization was associated with the Communist Party of Spain (PCE), which was — at the time — also active despite repression. The organization was established out of concern that the PCE was excluding women in the anti-Franco movement; notable founding members include Dulcinea Bellido, Maruja Cazcarra, Paquita Martín de Isidro, and Carmen Rodríguez, all of whom were members of the aforementioned Communist Party.

Utilizing entryism, maintaining a non-sectarian outlook, and emphasizing coalition-building and consciousness raising, MDM sought to mobilize women such as housewives who were not particularly experienced in organizing — specifically food insecurity and spousal persecution campaigns. MDM's campaigns also targeted more broader, systemic issues, such as gender inequality, education, labor conditions, and inequities in civil law.

Movimiento Democrático de Mujeres was legalized in 1976, following Franco's death and Spain's transition to democracy. However, despite its contributions to anti-Francoist organizing and feminist mobilization, radical figures and organizations critiqued MDM's 'doble militancia' or, rather, its collaboration with male-dominated parties and supposedly reactionary groups within Spanish society. Some, most notably la Asociación de Amas de Casa, accused MDM of fostering 'colonial' relationships with its 'partners.' This skepticism of MDM — along with the end of the Franco regime — resulted in its loss of relevance as a political entity. The organization is still active today, though in a lesser capacity as an educational resource.

== Context ==
=== Franco Regime ===
On July 18, 1936 General Francisco Franco and his military forces led a revolt against the left Republican government that would turn into a long lasting and brutal civil war for Spain. By October 1, 1936 Franco had become Chief of State and by 1938 his militarily victory against the left Republican government was almost all but confirmed. On April 1, 1939 he would go on to obtain full control of the nation and from that point on until his passing he would go unchallenged. Throughout his rule, he had little support or sympathy for those he considered to be defeated and his regime would be characterized by his punishment for those that disagreed with him or opposed him.

The Franco regime would go on to arrest, exile, and sentence thousands of republicans from the old regime to concentration camps. Women were also heavily affected by the Franco regime as many of them were arrested during the civil war period or killed during skirmishes with civil guards. Women saw devaluation of their social rights as they were kept from higher education and holding public office positions. Under the Franco regime, civil marriage and divorce were also abolished and contraceptives such as birth control were banned.

=== Rise of Spanish feminism ===
The Franco regime, patriarchal and socially conservative in nature, deprived women of basic rights that they had enjoyed under the previous Second Republic. Women were expected now to be reserved to private spheres such as being a mother to their children and ensuring the house was kept well and maintained while husbands went out and provided for their families. When women married they were also expected to stop working and if they wanted to pursue a career they needed the permission from their husbands. Laws passed under the Franco regime made it so women were an accessory to their husbands with reduced social rights; they were barred from divorce, equal education, job opportunities, and more. The Franco regime saw challenges and resistance throughout its reign, but especially so after the death of Francisco Franco in 1975. The increased struggle culminated in the creation of neighborhood associations with the first female mobilizations coming from 1952-1960. Among these neighborhood associations was El Movimiento Democrático de Mujeres.

== History ==
=== Formation of Movimiento Democrático de Mujeres ===
Left-wing political parties gained traction during this period, and the increase in political tensions approached a boiling point with the advent of neighborhood associations directly combatting the new regime. Among these associations was the Movimiento Democrático de Mujeres which arose from women closely attached to the Communist Party of Spain. These women included Dulcinea Bellido, Maruja Cazcarra, Paquita Martín de Isidro, and Carmen Rodríguez who were all members of the Communist Party of Spain, but felt that the party had sidelined their efforts and chose males to represent the anti-Franco movement.

=== Organizing efforts and activism ===
The Movimiento Democrático de Mujeres hosted among the first few meetings for women empowerment and feminist ideas, held in the late 1960s. These meetings mostly focused on raising awareness for the women’s cause and advocating for female participation in their political struggle. However, the main objective of these meetings was to bring in women who were not involved in the labor movement to participate in anti-Franco organizing, mainly housewives. Initially, there was little focus on gender differences and conflict: the focus was on creating alliances with women not involved in the PCE. The MDM used a technique of entryism — wherein the organization encouraged its members to join other organizations in order to expand their cause and bring in new members — by joining housewife organizations.

At first, MDM emphasized issues like food prices or solidarity with their persecuted male loved ones, as it was believed that these issues would more easily mobilize housewives. Although the group was connected to the Communist Party, the MDM had an autonomous front, and one of its primary drawing factors was its acceptance of various ideologies, including socialism and Christianity alongside its communist backing. The organization understood that feminists needed to address political situations to initiate more progress – including gender equity and social rights such as coeducation, civil marriage, divorce, and recognition of paternity – and its members were increasingly concerned with raising consciousness within a separate sphere of political struggle for women.

The MDM was not necessarily motivated by feminist understandings or issues of gender conflict; rather, it attempted to mobilize those in the labor movement on a localized level as a way to oppose the Franco dictatorship. As time went on, they began to fight against food shortages, sought to promote sexual equality, and created facilities that would assist them in child-rearing and maintaining their homes, including nurseries and cantinas. MDM members entrusted organizing efforts to housewives who could be united on these specific fronts. These particular activists aspired to achieve recognition of the domestic sphere as a space that transcended traditional notions of oppressed matriarchs.

Additionally, after the Movimiento Democrático de Mujeres was able to establish itself in various cities, it fought for equal education by posting announcements and bulletins across these cities. With a specific focus on coalition building, MDM was the first movement for individuals to mobilize on issues of gender and class external from party political affiliations. Movimiento Democrático de Mujeres was not particularly focused on establishing distinctly political alliances: it centered on establishing extra institutional feminisms by forming solidarity across different organizations and through coalition-building efforts.

=== Decline ===
Although the MDM still exists today, it has much less political and feminist significance than it did in the 1960s and 1970s. One factor in the MDM's waning influence was that of differing theoretical notions on the left and competing ideologies. Some radical activists preferred the prioritization of working women or wives of workers in mobilization and active participation, with explicit exclusion of the rest of the population considered to be too privileged. Other individuals further considered how to approach women’s oppression as it intersected with class division. “Doble militancia” – the ability for some women to achieve activist roles in a political party and women’s group simultaneously – was particularly debated within MDM. More radical feminists and those who acknowledged the intersection of gender and class believed that doble militancia should be rejected in favor of exclusive focus on women’s group activism. Some radicals also rejected cooperation and collaboration with male-dominated political parties, but the MDM primarily agreed to work with a variety of spheres of Spanish society in solidarity against Franco.

Another shortcoming of the Movimiento Democrático de Mujeres that contributed to its eventual decline in membership and influence was the experiences of allied organizations alluding to colonization. The Asociación de Amas de Casa was one such group that described its relationship with Movimiento Democrático de Mujeres as a colonization rather than a free, willful partnership. Other organizations allied with Movimiento Democrático de Mujeres expressed sentiments of increased division after an initial loose alliance.

== Contemporary relevance ==
Despite the MDM's gradual decline, it continues to have a legacy today. It is generally referred to when discussing the fascist regime of the twentieth century, especially how feminist advocacy and activism helped secure women's rights and freedoms in Spain. Recently, the FemiAgenda—a Spanish journal discussing feminist news, discussions, and opinions—posted an article dedicated to the MDM, recalling its success in mobilizing women of different ages, classes, and ideologies to fight for their cause. The MDM website is still active and tends to post singling out certain women activists and their work, such as Sonia Sánchez. It also outlines the necessary work in other Spanish-speaking countries or areas, such as Latin America, and brings awareness to the women's rights issues occurring in these countries. The website continues to update readers on domestic women's rights issues, though it also provides opportunities for readers to contribute their opinions through discussion posts and letters to the staff. Although the MDM no longer works as the nationwide platform for female mobilization, it furthers its legacy through spreading information and engaging with the public, allowing women to both understand domestic and national issues while also contributing their opinions and having their voices heard.
