= Women in PSOE in Francoist Spain and the democratic transition =

Women in PSOE in Francoist Spain had been involved in important socialist activism since the 1930s, including behind the scenes during the Asturian miners' strike of 1934, even as the party offered few leadership roles to women and address the issues of women. During the Civil War, the party was one of the few left wing actors to reject the idea of women on the front, believing women instead should take care of the home.

Socialists continued to have a fraught relationship with feminism during the post-war early Franco period with 10% female membership, and Partido Comunista Española (PCE) overtook PSOE in importance as the dominant left wing group in the Spanish interior. Most of the prominent socialists leaders and many women in PSOE fled to exile abroad. Those who remained were subject to severe repression. Many were imprisoned. Some were executed. During the 1940s, PSOE's interior activities were clandestine. Toulouse would become the home of leadership on the exterior, with exile women in France and Mexico playing important exterior roles. Leadership faced numerous challenges in the 1950s as a result of regime repression. In the 1960s, interior and external divisions came out into the open with women like Josefina Arrillaga and Carmen García Bloise playing critical roles in the unfolding drama. The early 1970s saw a period of renewal and renovation of the PSOE executive committee. Addressing women's issue was not something PSOE was able to do, as women in power understood that an attempt to do so would lead to internal party divisions. Divided amongst themselves, PSOE aligned women would be at the forefront of introducing more explicitly socialist and politically class focused third-wave feminism to Spain.

The transition would see Adolfo Suarez's Unión de Centro Democrático (UCD) come to power in 1977 following Franco's 1975 death. Ignoring women's issues would be one of the reasons UCD lost the 1982 elections and PSOE come into power. PSOE would declare its explicit support for feminism by 2019.

== Background ==
Francoist Spain was a pseudo-fascist state whose ideology rejected what it considered the inorganic democracy of the Second Republic. It was an embrace of organic democracy, defined as a reassertion of traditional Spanish Roman Catholic values that served as a counterpoint to the Communism of the Soviet Union during the same period. It came into exist in 1939 following the end of the Spanish Civil War. Misogyny and heteronormativity where linchpins of fascism in Spain, where the philosophy revolved around patria and fixed gender roles that praised the role of strong male leadership.

In July 1936, the Spanish Civil War started with a military coup attempt launched from the Spanish enclave of Melilla. In October of that same year, Franco took over as the Generalissimo and Chief of State in Nationalist zones. On 19 April 1937, Catholic and Falangist parties were merged, making Falange Española Tradicionalista the official state party behind Nationalist lines. On 30 January 1938, the first National State Cabinet meeting was held, with the Spanish Civil War formally coming to an end on 1 April 1939 and an official government formalized on 8 August 1939.

The Franco regime banned all political parties and trade unions. The only permissible type organization was Falange, founded by José Antonio Primo de Rivera in 1933. An election was held in 1966, where people were given the option to affirm or deny Franco's leadership. With more voters than electors, Franco was affirmed as Head of State. Prince Juan Carlos was appointed as Franco's official successor in 1970, with Admiral Luis Carrero Blanco being the unofficial successor. Carrero Blanco was assassinated in 1973 by ETA. Franco died in November 1975.

== History ==
=== Pre-Francoism period ===
Pablo Iglesias founded PSOE in 1879, and its union, Unión General de Trabajadores (UGT) in 1888. Early growth for the party was slowed as it was in competition with an anarchist trade union that focused on reaching out to Spain's working class. PSOE also had a rigid Marxist ideology coupled with anti-clericalism. This was sometimes difficult for Spain's small industrial working class population who had many other left-wing political options to choose from. In 1921, a split developed inside PSOE which resulted in the creation of Partido Comunista Española (PCE). Despite this, during the 1920s the party continued to grow and was the largest one in the country by 1931 when the Second Republic was founded.

Women played roles behind the scenes in one of the first major conflicts of the Second Republic, when workers' militias seized control of the mines in Asturias. Originally planned as a nationwide strike, the workers collective action only really took place in Asturias. Some women were involved in propaganda and others in assisting the miners. After the government quelled the insurrection by bringing in Moroccan legionaries, some 30,000 people found themselves in prison and another 1,000 were put into graves. A large number of those put into prison were women. Women also played an advocacy role in trying to see their husbands and male relatives released.

=== Civil War period (1936 - 1939) ===
PSOE continued to ignore the unique problems of women during the Civil War. When women were interested in joining the party, they found themselves locked out of leadership positions. PSOE also refused to send women to the front, perpetuating the sexist belief that a woman could best serve the war effort by staying at home.

PSOE was one of the only major actors on the left to immediately reject the idea of women participating in combat. The idea was too radical for them, and they believed women should serve as heroes at home, providing support to civilian populations well behind the front lines. Women who were members of PSOE who found their way to combat did so by joining communist and socialist youth groups. One of the few publicly socialist identified militia women in this period was María Elisa García, who served as a miliciana with the Popular Militias as a member Asturias Battalion Somoza company.

María Lacrampe had joined UGT in 1932 and become involved with the 1934 Asturian Revolution. In November 1937, she became the secretary of the Asociación Socialista de Madrid. As part of her work, she assisted in bringing Spanish Republican children into exile in Belgium. At the conclusion of the war, she unsuccessfully tried to escape via boat by claiming she was a French citizen. By June 1939, she was in the Las Ventas Prison in Madrid, where she used her time to work as a nurse assisting children of other female prisoners. She would also be present right before many women were put to death, with many of these women offering her their last testimonies.

UGT and PSOE were both banned by Franco in 1938.

=== Post Civil War period (1939 - 1945) ===
Following the end of the Spanish Civil War, PCE was the most successful organization when it came to rebuilding their organization. PSOE in comparison faced a lot more internal and external struggles to rebuild. Despite these challenges, PSOE sought to re-organize its structure by merging the youth branch (JLE) with the main arm of the party. This re-organization first took place in Spanish prisons, before being implemented into PSOE's clandestine structure outside prison walls. Following a round of pardons in 1943 that benefited many socialists, structural changes within PSOE accelerated, culminating in the first National Executive Commission being held in 1944. Prior to that, the last Executive Committee had been elected in 1939, with its chair José Gómez Osorio executed in 1940. Feminism and socialism continued to have a fraught relationship during the early Francoist period. Partido Comunista de España became the dominant clandestine political organization in Spain following the end of the Civil War. It would retain this position until the death of Franco saw PSOE replace it.

Most of the resistance in Spain during the early Franco period was a result of guerrillas, who coordinated their activities in the interior both with political militants in exile and with militants in prison. Most of Spain's militant women who remained in Spain were in prison or had gone underground where they served as important figures in coordinating activities between all three groups. Prisons in this case proved invaluable for many militant women as they allowed them to rebuild their activist networks or create new networks. They were also one of the biggest sources of female resistance to the Franco regime by exercising daily resistance behind prison walls.

Following the end of the Spanish Civil War, the leadership of PSOE went into exile and reconstituted themselves externally with leadership largely based in France. Inside Spain, PSOE shrank to all but a few militants mostly based in the Basque country and Asturian UGT strongholds.

Socialist women also went into exile during and after the Spanish Civil War. Oran, Algeria would receive around 7,000 members of PSOE and UGT who fled into exile as a result of the Spanish Civil War. UGT and PSOE party member Selina Asenjo Puello went into exile in Argentina after 12 years in France. María Lejárraga also spent time in exile in many European and South American countries. Spanish Socialist women in general found their most welcome home in Mexico. Four of PSOE's five Second Republican female deputies eventually sought exile in Mexico. These women included Veneranda García Manzano, Matilde de la Torre, Julia Álvarez Resano and Margarita Nelken.

Socialist women, along with mothers, daughters and wives of male socialist party members, were subject to severe repression. Women only connected to the socialist movement because of family members were tortured to draw those family members from hiding. Some Asturian socialists went into hiding near family members in the region. Women took great risks on a daily basis, in some cases for years, to provide them with supplies.

Socialist women found themselves in prison in the post-Civil War period. Ángeles Malonda was one of the socialist women imprisoned during the Franco regime as a result of her involvement with the party during the Civil War. Claudina García Perez served as a member of UGT's Executive Committee from October 1937 to April 1939. By May 1939, when the Spanish Civil War was officially over, García Perez was in the Las Ventas Prison in Madrid. The case against her was dismissed in 1940, and she was released from prison. Dulcenombre del Moral was married to a prominent Andalusian socialist, Ventura Castelló, and arrested in July 1936 to try to lure him out of hiding. She would stay in prison until her release in 1939. By that time, she had replaced her husband within PSOE and would be arrested multiple times more including in 1941, 1942 and 1944. PSOE and UGT militant Ángeles García Ortega was sent to prison for three years in 1939. PSOE and UGT militant Pilar Pascual was arrested in March 1939 in Yecla for writing an article about socialism. Sentenced to death, she would spend time in prison in Yelca, Murcia and Las Ventas in Madrid after her conviction was commuted. After leaving prison, she rejoined PSOE and was active with the organization until she died. PSOE and UGT militant María Añó was involved in clandestine PSOE organizations, and would be sent to prison several times as a result of her political activities. PSOE and UGT militant Julia Vigre played a central role in organizing clandestine union and party activities. She went to prison several times as a result. Mujeres Antifascistas member and PSOE militant Josefa Lirola was detained dozens of times for her involvement in protesting the regime.

Some women were executed because of their involvement with the party. María del Rey was executed by the regime because of her PSOE party membership.

=== 1940s ===
From the mid-1940s to the mid-1950s, women made up an estimated 10% of PSOE's membership.

==== Interior ====
Following the end of the Spanish Civil War, PSOE lacked an interior leadership body. Socialist women worked as liaisons or as messengers for clandestine PSOE and UGT activities. Some were sent to prison for many years as a result.

In 1943, Claudina García Perez was invited to serve in on the interior Executive Commission. She would also on the PSOE First and Second Executive Commission in the same period. Franco's government spied on her and persecuted her, before hunting her down with the intention of arresting her. García Perez then fled to exile in France in December 1946. The International Socialist Conference in Zurich in June 1947, with García Perez serving as the secretary of the Feminine Section of PSOE. She then moved to Mexico in February 1948.
In the Basque Country, following the Nationalist seizing control of the area, women found themselves being investigated by the new regime. In Biscay, over 300 different women were investigated in this period. Many were also imprisoned. They were subject to scrutiny because people accused them of being involved with or having sympathies for groups like PCE, UGT, PSOE, Partido Nacionalista Vasco (PNV), and Emakume Abertzaleen Batzak.

Julia Vigre was released from prison in 1943, and got back into contact with members of the UGT and PSOE Executive Committees. She developed a clandestine contact network inside Spanish prisons and with militant male Spanish activities in exile in Toulouse. She then facilitated clandestine communications between the two groups. She was re-arrested in 1945 before being freed against in 1948. Upon her release from prison, she went into hiding but continued her work in some Madrid based UGT and PSOE executive committees. She became involved with Agrupación Socialista Madrileña, and collaborated with another female militant socialist, Carmen Guelin. The work of the pair was critical in establishing the “malla de cristal”, a network that allowed communication between imprisoned socialist militants with their brethren in exile. Released in 1943, Lacrampe went on to serve in the PSOE First and Second Executive Commission. Her involvement with these commissions would lead to more time in prison.

A woman named Otilia played a critical role in Astruias through her work at the Sama de Langreo Market, where she supplied documents, changed documents and forged documents to facilitate operatives arriving from abroad, while also assisting in bringing in materials from overseas. Luisa Palacios González coordinated with Asturian militants doing clandestine missions in the Asturian hinterland, assisting in coordinating their activities with operatives in Madrid in 1945 and 1946. She also assisted in coordinating the exit of PSOE and UGT fugitives from their hiding spots in the Asturian mountains.

In 1946, women political prisoners in Madrid's Las Ventas prison held a hunger strike to protest the poor quality of food they were provided. Women from socialist, communist and anarchist organizations came together behind bars to coordinate the strike. While they were successful in seeing food quality improved, prison officials subsequently reorganized the prison population to prevent further political collaboration within the confines of the prison.

==== Exterior ====
The early Francoist period saw both PSOE and UGT largely absent from leadership positions. The only socialist woman in leadership for PSOE was Carmen Maestre Martín, and she actually on the executive committee of Junta de Liberación Española (JEL), which was not founded until February 1943. On 30 January 1944, she was appointed to the Sección de Trabajo, Previsión, Asistencia y Sanidad del Consejo Técnico of JLE. Matilde de la Torre and Julia Álvarez Resano had both been expelled from PSOE in 1946, and became political non-entities as a result. Dolores Arizaga went into exile in France following the end of the Spanish Civil War. She would serve as a representative of Section of Tarbes (Hautes Pyrénées) at the II PSOE Congress in exile in 1946. Carmen García Bloise joined the socialist movement as the daughter of a Spanish PSOE exile in Paris in 1948 when joined Juventudes Socialistas.

Agrupación de Socialistas Asturianos en México member Purificación Tomás would play an important role among socialist women in Mexico in the 1940s and 1950s. She was affiliated with the UGT affiliated exile group Círculo Pablo Iglesias. In 1942, Spanish Republican groups in exile met in Mexico, forming the Unión Democrática Española (UDE). Participants included PSOE, UGT, Izquierda Republicana (IR), Unión Republicana (UR), Partido Republicano Federal (PRF), Unió de Rabassaires and Aliança Nacional de Catalunya (ANC). Partido Comunista Española (PCE) was excluded as communists were out of favor following the end of the Spanish Civil War.

PSOE, UGT, PCE, Confederación Nacional del trabajo (CNT), Juventudes Socialistas de España (JSE), Movimiento Libertario Español (MLE) and the Moviment Socialista de Catalunya (MSC) continued their struggle in exile. From 1944 to 1960, the French city of Toulouse served as a major publishing hub for many of these organization's home in exile. The city of Toulouse itself would see around 40,000 exiles from these groups settle permanently in the city.

=== 1950s ===
Unlike other European countries where parties held control over unions, PSOE had very little leverage over UGT in the 1940s, 1950s and 1960s despite a large overlap in leadership. During the mid-1940s, 1950s and early 1960s, Barcelona based Movimiento Socialista de Cataluña was highly influenced by the British Labor party, who had developed extensive contacts with the group to give them legitimacy within Catalonia. Female leaders in the group in this period included Serra i Moret. PSOE's relationship with the group in this era was unstable, and Lucila Fernández was the only prominent female figure in PSOE's Catalan organization. During the 1950s and 1960s, neither UGT nor PSOE put much consideration into political ideologies and practices related to improving the lives of women.

Following the death of PSOE leader Tomás Centeno in prison in 1953, the PSOE Executive Committee and broader leadership were largely destroyed. Starting in the 1950s, Josefina Arrillaga Lansorena, a lawyer, began attending clandestine socialist meetings in Madrid. She became involved with Antonio Amat, who wanted to replace the dead Tomás Centeno in order to reconstruct both UGT and PSOE.

Socialist women played an important role in Asturias by doing clandestine work, such as coordinating between cells, supporting covert strike actions and taking over roles left vacant because male leaders were incarcerated. From 1957 to 1962, the Franco regime faced labor strikes in Asturias, with the biggest in Pozo María Luisa. Sindicato de los Obreros Mineros de Asturias (SOMA) had its greatest strength in this region, with socialist and communist women leading the organization of strikes on 23 March 1957. They organized in two locations, including the esplanade of Pozo María Luisa and at the highway connecting Oviedo with Campo de Caso. Their actions would serve as a blueprint for future strikes at the Nalón and Caudal mining basins.

PSOE and UGT were almost decapitated in 1958 following a police arrest of many of the leading figures of the movement from Asturias, Basque Country and Madrid. Antonio Amat was among those arrested. He was represented by Josefina Arrillaga Lansorena. While Amat was in prison, Josefina Arrillaga Lansorena took control of the PSOE party apparatus. Among the things she accomplished was creating a priority list agreed upon by other Madrid PSOE members. This included maintaining a relationship with PSOE leadership in Toulouse, showing solidarity and support for PSOE prisoners, issuing regular newsletters and reports, and integrating the organization both internally and externally. One of the most important things Arrillaga Lansorena did was establish a relationship with the socialist backed Asturian miners. Another important thing she did was make contact with foreign newspapers including Britain's The Times, the American Associated Press, and the French Agence France-Presse where she provided a different perspective on the realities of Francoist Spain.

In November 1958, there were a large number of raids conducted by the Spanish state that saw many people arrested and sent to prison around the whole of Spain. People picked up in this period would include many women involved with the miners strike in Asturias earlier in the year. Many of the women imprisoned as a consequence of the raid would go on to play leading roles in the Spanish socialist community of the 1960s. Among those arrested was Josefina Arrillaga Lansorena. In 1958, Josefina Arrillaga and José Federico de Carvajal created a Spain based a UGT Lawyers' Office, which allowed the organization to provide legal services to many people including Antonio Alonso Baño, Luis Castillo Almena, Carlos Zayas and María Luisa Suárez Roldán.

=== 1960s ===
==== Interior - external divisions ====
By 1959, divisions had emerged between socialist elements in the Spanish interior and those in leadership in Toulouse in the exterior. Josefina Arrillaga was at the center of this battle for the heart of PSOE and UGT. She had been serving at the primary contact with Toulouse but, on 12 April 1960, she was dismissed from this role. Despite her dismissal, Josefina Arrillaga still played a key role in facilitating clandestine communications between Toulouse and key jailed socialist figures in Spain's interior. Her role would see the November 1961 trial of seven Basque nationalists attended by the British journalist and Labour MP Ernest Davies as well as Christian Democrat Right leader José Maria Gil Robles, and the secretary of the Christian Democrat Left. On 21 May 1962, León Ramos informed the Spanish Democrats Defence Committee (SDDC) that Amat, Josefine Arillaga and Vicente Girbau were trying to destroy PSOE from within and were actively collaborating with the communist. The SDDC was a PSOE and British Labour Party working group. The British Labour party decided to maintain contact with all involved as a 1959 party rule dictated they not become involved in internal Spanish party squabbling. Josefina Arrillaga would continue to develop her contact network in 1961 to aid in the socialist cause. New contacts would include Amnesty International founder Peter Benenson, Fritz Erler of the German SPD, German metalworks union IG Metall, and UGT members like Manuel Fernández-Montesinos living in exile in Germany.

Madrid based Josefina Arrillaga and Manuel Fernández-Montesinos would further split from the Toulouse group over their support of the creation of the Alianza Sindical Obrera (ASO), which drew heavily from UGT membership and advocated for a radical change in approach for the movement in the interior. Arrillaga would support World Federation of Trade Unions (WFTU) participation by ASO, attending several of WFTU's international congresses. Arrillaga's participation internationally ended the monopoly held by Toulouse of representing PSOE internationally and as Spain's primary free trade unionist organization. Josefina Arrillaga later immigrated to Germany in 1966, which along with the arrest of figures like Manuel Fernández Montesinos and the dissolution of the Madrid PSOE group, saw ASO go into the decline.

Carmen García Bloise was one of the female leaders inside PSOE during the 1960s. She believed that PSOE and UGT needed to be governed from inside Spain, not from the exterior. Along with others in the informal Paris group, she believed that militants inside Spain should be given greater weight and consideration inside PSOE and UGT. Her position closely aligned her with ASO. She played a critical role in understanding the need for PSOE to be governed from the interior and then assisting in moving those structures there from the exterior. From 1965 to 1970, Carmen García Bloise was a member of the PSOE Steering Committee in exile. She represented the Paris Section at the X PSOE Congress in 1967.

==== Interior ====
Trade unions were officially not allowed in Francoist Spain with the nominal exception of the Falange led union organization Organización Sindical Española (OSE). Women tended not to be involved with them. When they did though, Falangist women would often find themselves working alongside socialist and communist women and would serve as a focused source of opposition to the regime.

Despite support from PSOE and UGT, miners faced setbacks in the period between 1962 and 1970. Consequently, PSOE became more important in urban areas like Gijón. Encarna Vega and her husband Marcelo García Suárez played an important role in restructuring the local party apparatus. Encarna Vega also became actively involved in clandestine activities like producing and distributing party propaganda, and distributing the El Socialista and Adelante magazines.

The arrest of the core of the Madrid group including Fernández-Montesinos, Nuero and Nogués left Josefina Arrillaga uncertain. The Lawyers Group could not overcome their loss. The remaining Madrid group still had to deal with tensions from leadership in Toulouse. Consequently, Arrillaga felt she could not overcome these difficulties and left for Germany in 1966 and became politically inactive.

Movimiento Democrático de Mujeres (MDM) was created in 1965 in Barcelona by communist and Catalan socialist women. The organization quickly found covert support among other women in northern Spain as they tried to accomplish socio-political goals. Because of their overt feminist ideologies, some supporters worried MDM's "doble militancia" would diminish their effectiveness as they sought to work towards concrete political goals. The organization drew from two different eras of Spanish feminists. The first was a community of older women who had suffered the most under the change from the Second Republic to Francoist Spain. The second group was known as the "pro preso" generation who came of age through clandestine neighborhood led activism. This meant the organization's feminist goals were sometimes in conflict and not well defined as members had to navigate ideological differences in what being a feminist meant.

MDM had always been strongly susceptible to party politics of both the Communists and Socialists. In 1969, these ideological differences would lead to the organization splitting in Catalonia. Because PCE was more organized in Madrid, MDM continued there and in other PCE strongholds.

Ana María Ruiz-Tagle Morales began her militancy in PSOE in 1965. A labor lawyer by training, her militancy was assisted by Felipe González, with whom she shared an office in Seville. She played an important role by providing legal assistance on union affairs. She served as a bridge to an earlier period with her collaborations with Dulce del Moral, who had previously been the most important militant in Andalusia.

Ludivina García Arias, daughter of Spanish exiles, returned to Spain from Mexico in 1969. She was part of a generational shift in PSOE leadership in the 1970s. Within a few years, she married PSOE Asturias leader Juan Luis Rodríguez Vigil. One of her first jobs was assisting other returning exiles in dealing with their paperwork.

Carmen Romero and Felipe González met at university in Seville, where both were already involved in anti-Francoist militancy. On 17 July 1969, the couple were civilly married by proxy as Felipe González was in Bordeaux, only returning on 18 July for a religious ceremony. The couple had their honeymoon in France so Felipe González could attend a Socialist Youth meeting in Toulouse. Returning from their honeymoon, Carmen Romero set up a house in 1969 which later became the headquarters for the Federación Española de Trabajadores de la Enseñanza de UGT at calle Espinosa and Cárcel in Seville. By 1970, Carmen Romero was working as a teacher.

In 1969, Dulcenombre del Moral and her husband were the head of a militant PSOE group in Andalusia that included Alfonso Guerra, Felipe González, Guillermo Galeote and Luis Yánez.

==== Exterior ====
During the 1960s in Mexico, Purificación Tomás played a leading role among exiled socialist women. She was in charge of organizing the IX Congreso of PSOE in Mexico in 1964. Purificación Tomás created the Secretariado Femenino, with the goal of integrating women's issues into the broader Spanish socialist movement. She built and maintained contacts with the Socialist International Women.

=== Francoist 1970s (1970 - 1975) ===
1971 British documentary about Spain that shows women, class problems and issues of Basque nationalists.

With the renovation of the PSOE executive committee in the period between 1970 and 1974, practices around women's issues remained the same as they had during the past. They did not create any structures to legitimize women's issues. They offered little to women to suggest the socialists were a legitimate force for deal with women's issues.

During the early 1970s, Asturian socialists and militants played a critical role in providing a renewal for PSOE and UGT's leadership. During the early 1970s, Ana María Ruiz-Tagle Morales was in contact with exterior leadership in Toulouse. In 1972, with the help of Asturian socialists and militants, PSOE leadership moved from the exterior in Toulouse to the interior with the decision ratified by the PSOE Congress in 1974.

Carmen García Bloise represented the Paris Section at the XI PSOE Congress in 1970 and 1972. From 1970 to 1972, Carmen García Bloise was a substitute member of the PSOE Steering Committee in exile based on her position in the 6th area (Seiene). Carmen García Bloise would be appointed the Secretary of the Formación del Militante by the new PSOE committee following the XII Congreso of PSOE that saw the interior finally come into power. Carmen García Bloise's elevation to the Executive Committee of PSOE in 1972 marked the first time a woman had served in this role for PSOE since the Spanish Civil War. She would be dismissed in 1974 after the election of Felipe González as PSOE Secretary General. Despite this, Carmen García Blois left her job at Renault and moved to Madrid where she became PSOE's accountant. She was joined by another woman, Miguel Ángel Martínez's Egyptian wife Myriam Soliman who served as Felipe González's personal secretary. She also served as the PSOE Organization and Administration of the Executive Commission manager. Carmen Romero moved with her husband to Madrid in 1974 after he became the Secretary General of PSOE. She took up teaching in Madrid and became more active in UGT's Federación Española de Trabajadores de la Enseñanza .

Encarna Vega and Ludivina García Arias both spent time in hiding. They worked to coordinate their activities to promote UGT and PSOE in Oviedo during the early 1970s. During the 1970s, Encarna Vega ran a hair salon, and used her Oveido home to host PSOE party meetings before the local party found a more permanent home. As a result of her militancy, Ludivina García Arias moved to Asturias in 1971.

María Begoña Abdelkader García joined a clandestine socialist organization in July 1970. Josefina Arrillaga returned to Spain in 1974. She would briefly rejoin PSOE during the transition period. Matilde Fernández joined PSOE in the last years of the dictatorship. Ana María Ruiz-Tagle Morales assisted in re-organizations socialist organizations in the Andalusia, and in reinvigorating PSOE Executive Committees during the early 1970s.

By 1970, many liberal and socialist women had left the Catholic Church in Spain. These women joined clandestine political organizations and trade unions. During the 1970s, the core female constituency of PSOE was composed of returned children of Spanish exiles. The women that proposed the Secretariado Femenino would be responsible for proposing its elimination at the 1970 PSOE Congress. Their argument was the organization had achieved limited results and PSOE had more pressing needs related to organizational restructuring. Carmen García Bloise was the primary defender of the Secretariado Femenino at the 1970 PSOE Congress. She believed that without it, it would be hard for women to become involved with and have their issues taking seriously within the socialist movement. Despite her opposition, PSOE dissolved the Secretariado Femenino. Despite Ana María Ruiz-Tagle Morales, Carmen García Bloise and Dulce del Moral working together in the early 1970s, there was never the possibility of Grupo Femenino del PSOE in Seville as it would have led to a rupture within PSOE. All three women considered the broader political goals of PSOE more important than the specific needs of socialist women as a group.

In 1974, MDM changed their name to Movimeinto para la Liberación de la Mujer (MDM-MLM) and became more explicitly feminist in their political activism. In this new period of activity, they were attacked by many leftist organizations who believed they were too bourgeois and that a focus on feminist goals was a distraction from the broader class based struggle in Spain. At the same time, MDM-MLM also challenged traditional patriarchal left wing views on women. They were also attacked by the right for being communists, anti-woman and anti-regime. The group faced internal divisions on whether they needed male activists to achieve women's political goals, or whether they should remain sex segregated so as to challenge patriarchal beliefs.

The high-profile quarrels among leftist women and increasingly involvement of male dominated political organizations led to the creation in the 1970s of third-wave radical feminism in Spain, that was both similar and notably dissimilar to their American counterparts of the same name by being more explicitly socialist and politically focused on class in their orientation. These women would found Partido Feminist (PF) and Seminario Colectivo Feminista, an organization founded in 1976 as a result in a split inside PF.

=== Democratic transition 1970s (1976-1985) ===
To avoid bloodshed following the death of Franco on 20 November 1975, left leaning parties like PSOE and PCE agreed to the "pact of silence" which largely involved not discussing or seeking to prosecute atrocities committed by the Franco regime during its time in power, or by either side during the Spanish Civil War.

After Franco's death, María Begoña Abdelkader García was part of a group that created PSC-PSOE AS in Hospitalet (Barcelona). Ana María Ruiz-Tagle became involved in feminist groups and trying to address women's rights starting in 1976 during the transition. She would go on to be a Spanish Senator representing PSOE in 1982, 1986 and 1989. Palmira Pla Pechovierto returned from Venezuelan exile in the late 1970s. The teacher immediately became involved with PSOE in Castellón, and went on to represent the area in the 1977 Constitutional Legislature of Spain. At the December 1976 XXVII PSOE Congress in Madrid, Carmen García Bloise was elected secretary of Administration of the Executive Commission. In 1977, Carmen Romero became UGT's Executive Education Committee Press Secretary.

Feminists groups watched the process of creating a new Spanish constitution with concern. On 6 December 1978, a number of groups presented Cortes president Antonio Hernández Gil with a list of their concerns about it. Signatories included women who were members of UCD, PSOE, PC, MDM, ADM-PT and ORT-ULM. They wanted the constitution to commit the government to incorporating women into the workforce, that marriage should be based on equality of spouses, that marriages could be dissolved by mutual consent of either spouse, that every women should have the right to decide how many children she would have, and that women should have access to birth control. These women were opposed to Article 15, which said that "everyone has the right to life" (Spanish: todos tienen derecho a la vida) as they felt it could be interpreted as offering protection to fetuses. Their fears would be realized on 11 April 1985, when this constitutional wording was used to declare an abortion law illegal.

The Primeras Jornadas de la Mujer were held in the Basque Country from 8 - 11 December 1978. The Primeras Jornadas de la Mujer were held in Granada in 1979. At both, the issue of dual militancy was discussed by women trade unionists and political party members in attendance. For many of these women, even though they were able to work, their husbands often demanded they do traditional women's housework and childcare because the husband said his unionist and political activities were more important than hers. This left many women feeling insecure in their activism.

==== 1977 Spanish general elections ====
The transition period saw Unión de Centro Democrático (UCD) come into power led in 1977 by Prime Minister Adolfo Suarez on a liberal platform espousing women's rights. PSOE captured 28.5% of the vote to place second among all parties. This gave them a third of the seats in the Cortes. Because Adolfo Suarez's party lacked an absolute majority to govern, he was forced to form a coalition with other more right leaning parties. This resulted in a dilution of women's priorities and angered many women's rights advocates and feminists, serving to splinter these groups along ideological priority based grounds that saw one side view participation in the constitutional draft process as being part of emancipated citizenship while another faction saw it as oppressed women being forced to participate in their own repression. Radical feminists opposed to UCD felt vindicated in their doubts following the 1979 general elections, which saw 21 women or 6 percent of the 350 seats belonging to women, down from 22 in the previous congress. At the same time, UCD continued to be the largest political organization for women with the most representation of any party in Congress, with 11 women deputies and 4 women senators. In contrast, PSOE refused to address women's issues more broadly and to prioritize women's concerns. They did not move women's positions up their list, and consequently the number of female PSOE representatives fell in 1979 to 6 from the previous high of 11.

Ahead of the 15 June 1977 general elections, political and social conditions largely remained unchanged. Leftist parties did not necessarily accept demands of most feminists accept for certain issues like the legalization of conception. Many feminists involved in political groups abandoned specific goals in favor of broader political goals, resulting in a diluted form of feminism being adapted by major leftist parties.

==== 1979 Spanish general elections ====
Ahead of the 1979 elections, González decided to abandon Marxism as a party principle. He believed that doing so would make the party more attractive to Spanish women voters who were supporting more centrist oriented parties. As a result, PSOE managed to win over many women from Union of the Democratic Centre. In some regions, women PSOE voters heavily outnumber their male counterparts.

==== 1982 Spanish general elections ====
The 1982 Spanish general elections were a landslide victory of PSOE, and see 18 of the 22 women in Congress be party members. Despite this, women affiliated with PSOE continued to deal with issues of dual militancy, where they battled both for their political goals and feminist ideology that sometimes could be at odds with each other. More men than women voted for PSOE in the 1982 elections.

=== Democratic Spain (1985 - present) ===
In honor of 2019 International Women's Day, PSOE leader Pedro Sanchez reaffirmed the party's commitment to feminism, saying that it was at the heart of the party. In a statement published that day, he was quoted as saying, "We will continue working tirelessly to achieve total and effective equality. The voice of the brave women and men who claim it is ours, because the Spain you want is feminist."

Carmen García Bloise died on 13 July 1994 as the result of a failed liver transplant.
