= Double Militancia =

Double Militancia (Spanish: Doble Militancia) is a political practice and consciousness among some feminists in Latin America who were active in both a movement for national liberation as well as the women's movement. Women in traditional Left parties in the twentieth century understood Double Militancia as the interrelated, twofold struggle against gender and class-based oppression. This consciousness developed as women came to question their experiences of subordination by men in traditional national liberation throughout the 1960s and 1970s. Double Militancia developed in various national liberation movements and movement spaces in Latin America. Across Latin American countries, women participated in organizations, parties, and movements for national liberation from foreign imperialism alongside men, but they commonly experienced gender discrimination within these spaces. In various revolutionary Left parties and guerrilla armies, women were expected to prove their worth by performing traditionally masculine tasks, like taking up arms or labor organizing; however, men were not expected to share in traditionally female responsibilities of cleaning, cooking, or childcare to the same extent. This contradictory experience led some Latin American revolutionary women to develop increased militancy against oppression. They argued that a nation's liberation from foreign domination should include women's liberation from subordination, even in their own organizing spaces. Double Militancia calls attention to the specificity of women's experiences under capitalism, and the presence of male prejudice in revolutionary organizations.

== Background ==
Double Militancia was developed out of mass women's participation and leadership in movements for National liberation, which were taking place throughout Latin America. Movements for national liberation arose in response to nationwide conditions of extreme socioeconomic injustice, as large sectors of people developed a Marxist analysis of class struggle and the need for liberation. The popularity of national liberation movements grew, and mass participation grew with it. From guerrilla warfare to educational campaigns, various tactics were used. Throughout the 20th centuries, movements in Mexico, Bolivia, Cuba, and Nicaragua successfully overthrew previous regimes in an attempt to create new political, social and economic orders. In the early 1960s, guerrilla movements formed in nearly every Latin America country. Notably, the revolutionary guerrilla struggle was waged in Guatemala, Venezuela, Colombia, Peru and El Salvador.

Many women participated in these parties, movements, and guerrilla armies, and various women's organizations were formed under the umbrella of national liberation organizations to particularly address women's needs and mobilize women in participation. In some of Latin America, women did not just participate in guerrilla groups––they were the ones who organized them: taking up arms, and dying in combat to achieve their political goals. The particular roles and responsibilities that women took up in national liberation movements were often extensions of women's traditional roles in society. These included acting as nurses, cooks, or partners to their men, who were also in the movement. In particular, women who participated as guerrillas were quite often the wives or relatives of male revolutionaries. In El Salvador, women also took up nontraditional gendered roles by being trade union leaders and politicians.

Despite mass participation of women, the particular issues of women were not prioritized in all of these movements. National liberation movements across Latin America were led by men, though thousands of women participated. Gendered discrimination and imposed norms limited women's equal treatment and recognition within the movement, highlighting the primary contradiction of gender oppression in spaces for national liberation. Colombia was one of the only movements wherein the revolutionary leadership put out any specific statements about women's issues. In an international document called the Platform For a United Front, Colombian revolutionary leader Camilo Torres Restrepo wrote the movement's clause on women's rights, framing women's roles in the revolution as that of mothers and especially wives. In the popular text, Guerrilla Warfare, Cuban revolutionary leader Che Guevara wrote that women did have a place in the revolution, but he framed this primarily as that of a support role to men. Cuban women who took up arms as guerrilla fighters were painted as exceptional rather than equal. Relatedly, in 1970s Peru, women were central to political struggles for national independence but did not gain formal leadership positions in government or political parties.

This shared experience unique to women in national liberation movements led to the growth of Double Militancia. Double Militancia took the form of an increase in political consciousness of the connections between women's issues and Left political issues. Some women separating from traditional Left parties and spaces in order to establish their own feminist organizations, and other established feminist organizations within larger political parties or organizations in order to increase women's mobilization and speak to the community's issues as they relate to the struggle for liberation from capitalism and foreign control.

== Examples in Latin American Movements ==
=== El Salvador ===
A women's organization that showcased Double Militancia in El Salvador was the Association of El Salvadorean Women (Spanish: Asociacion de Mujeres de El Salvador), which operated under the umbrella of a larger central revolutionary organization for national liberation. AMES was founded in 1978 in the political context of general oppression and economic inequality, as peasants became landless, and urban workers suffered from unemployment and unprecedentedly poor working conditions. However, AMES was distinct from the larger revolutionary organization because it called attention to the way in which El Salvadorian women experienced specific gendered oppression in addition to these conditions: largely, men had control over women's wages and educational and work opportunities, and at times exercised sexual abuse towards women. AMES aimed to mobilize women towards the liberation struggle and, notably, to organize women to direct their activism directly towards challenging gender inequality.

AMES set itself apart from previous revolutionary organizations in El Salvador by explicitly calling out the need for liberation movements to respect the needs and lives of women, showcasing Double Militancia. Its statements brought attention to the particular issues facing women in El Salvador that were different or intensified versions of the issues men in El Salvador were fighting against. They called out the double burden of women carrying out familial and reproductive responsibilities on top of their political participation––a labor-intensive gendered role that remained passively accepted in general society and left movements. In its statement, AMES wrote about how the success of the national struggle for liberation in El Salvador would not automatically bring about the humanization and dignity of women, because the women's struggle against capitalism and machismo was twofold. AMES ran programs in liberated zones and refugee camps in El Salvador during the civil war, providing services and training to serve the women there, including literacy trainings to help women have more equal post-war entry to the workforce, and opportunities to participate in the administration of projects and upkeep of the liberated zones, which were primarily occupied by women.

=== Peru ===
Women participated actively in political struggle during the fight for national liberation in Peru in the late 1970s prior to the election of a civilian president in 1980. Class struggle was the primary focus and rallying cry of the movement in Peru, while analyses of the interplay between gender and class oppression were lacking in party politics, which were male dominated. This led many women in the left parties and organizations fighting for national liberation to reject the gendered oppression and inequity present in the movement. Many women left the political parties and spaces they were a part of to create their own feminist organizations that would explicitly address women's issues. A political division developed, in which some women in Peru identified primarily as feminists fighting against patriarchy and others primarily identified as militants fighting for freedom from capitalism. The third group that developed was people who had the Double Militancia perspective: they came to the consciousness that political parties and movements for liberation were interconnected with movements for gender equity, and could go hand in hand. Women who had Double militancia perspectives within existing parties for national liberation often advocated for more female participation at decision-making levels.

=== Honduras ===
In Honduras, many women in religious order were some of the first groups to develop consciousness of gendered discrimination and its intersection with national liberation. The rural housewives' club (spanish: clubes de amas de casa) or CAC exemplified this development of Double Militancia. This movement was not an isolated feminist movement––it was rooted in economic issues due to its relation with the peasant movement for agrarian reform, which particularly fought back against foreign companies like United Fruit which largely controlled the nation's wealth and resources. Honduras is a predominantly agricultural country, with the majority of its population living in the countryside and working the land. Honduran peasants sought land reform that would transfer private corporate ownership of idle or underutilized land to landless peasants.

CAC was actively involved in organizing with the peasants' movement as the larger Catholic church workers had been participating in organizing with the peasant leagues since 1963. Women in the CAC fought against issues of foreign economic domination and control as well as women's issues, seeing the two as connected. In the 1970s, the CAC developed a slogan that "The liberation of the people begins with the liberation of women." It had a variety of programs operating in the members' local rural communities which were meant to train and support women, such as health care, child-feeding programs, nutrition, sewing. In addition, CAC offered trainings that centered discussions of social and economic inequities and concepts of class struggle and social justice.
