= Pedro Sánchez =

Prime Minister of Spain since 2018

The Most Excellent Pedro Sánchez MP
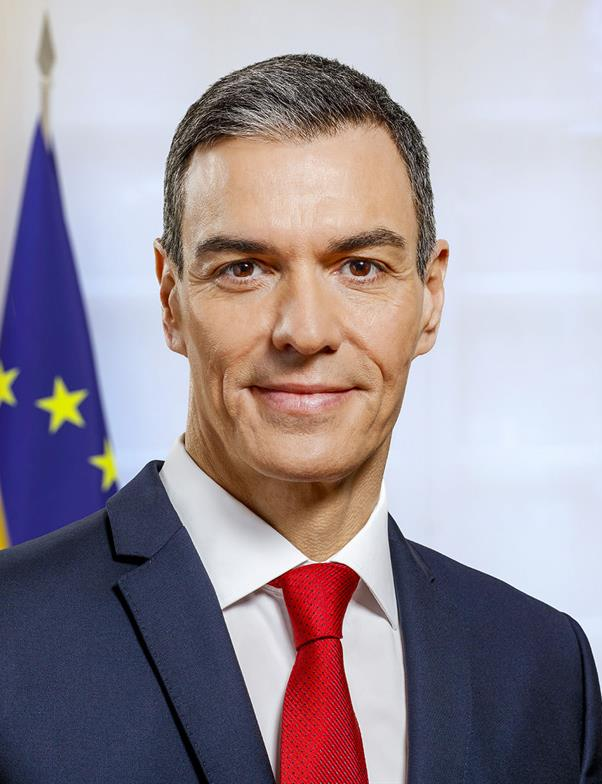
- Official portrait, 2026

Prime Minister of Spain
- Incumbent
- Assumed office 2 June 2018
- Monarch: Felipe VI
- Deputy: See list: First Deputy Carmen Calvo Nadia Calviño (Note: Previously served as third and second deputy prime minister.) María Jesús Montero (Note: Previously served as fourth deputy prime minister.) Carlos Cuerpo; Second Deputy Pablo Iglesias Yolanda Díaz (Note: Previously served as third deputy prime minister.); Third Deputy Teresa Ribera Sara Aagesen
- Preceded by: Mariano Rajoy

President of the Socialist International
- Incumbent
- Assumed office 25 November 2022
- Secretary General: Benedicta Lasi
- Preceded by: George Papandreou

Secretary-General of the Spanish Socialist Workers' Party
- Incumbent
- Assumed office 17 June 2017
- President: Cristina Narbona
- Deputy: Adriana Lastra; María Jesús Montero
- Preceded by: Caretaker committee
- In office 26 July 2014 – 1 October 2016
- President: Micaela Navarro
- Preceded by: Alfredo Pérez Rubalcaba
- Succeeded by: Caretaker committee

Leader of the Opposition
- In office 18 June 2017 – 2 June 2018
- Prime Minister: Mariano Rajoy
- Preceded by: Vacant
- Succeeded by: Mariano Rajoy
- In office 26 July 2014 – 1 October 2016
- Prime Minister: Mariano Rajoy
- Preceded by: Alfredo Pérez Rubalcaba
- Succeeded by: Vacant

Member of the Congress of Deputies
- Incumbent
- Assumed office 21 May 2019
- Constituency: Madrid
- In office 10 January 2013 – 29 October 2016
- Constituency: Madrid
- In office 15 September 2009 – 27 September 2011
- Constituency: Madrid

Member of the City Council of Madrid
- In office 18 May 2004 – 15 September 2009

Personal details
- Born: Pedro Sánchez Pérez-Castejón; 29 February 1972 (age 54) Madrid, Spain
- Party: Spanish Socialist Workers' Party (since 1993)
- Spouse: Begoña Gómez (m. 2006)
- Children: 2
- Education: Real Centro Universitario Escorial-Maria Christina; Université Libre de Bruxelles; IESE Business School; Camilo José Cela University

Military service
- Allegiance: Spain
- Branch/service: Spanish Army
- Years of service: 1996–1997
- Rank: Private

Pedro Sánchez Pérez-Castejón (Note: In this Spanish name, the first or paternal surname is Sánchez and the second or maternal family name is Pérez-Castejón.) (Spanish: [ˈpeðɾo ˈsantʃeθ ˈpeɾeθ kasteˈxon]; born 29 February 1972) is a Spanish politician who has been the prime minister of Spain since 2018. A member of the Spanish Socialist Workers' Party (PSOE), he is also Secretary-General of the party since 2017, having previously held that office from 2014 to 2016, and is the ninth president of the Socialist International since 2022.

Sánchez began his political career in August 2004 as a city councillor in Madrid, before being elected to the Congress of Deputies in 2009. In 2014, he was elected Secretary-General of the PSOE, becoming Leader of the Opposition. He led the party through the inconclusive 2015 and 2016 general elections, but resigned as Secretary-General shortly after the latter, following public disagreements with the party's executive. He was re-elected in a leadership election eight months later, defeating internal rivals Susana Díaz and Patxi López.

On 1 June 2018, the PSOE called a vote of no confidence against Prime Minister Mariano Rajoy, passing the motion after winning the support of Unidas Podemos, as well as various regionalist and nationalist parties. Sánchez was appointed prime minister by King Felipe VI the following day. He went on to lead the PSOE to gain 38 seats in the April 2019 general election, the PSOE's first national victory since 2008, although they fell short of a majority. After talks to form a government failed, Sánchez again won the most votes at the November 2019 general election, forming a minority coalition government with Unidas Podemos, the first national coalition government since the country's return to democracy. After the PSOE suffered significant losses in regional elections in May 2023, Sánchez called a snap general election, which saw the PSOE hold all of its seats; despite finishing second behind the People's Party, Sánchez was able to again form a coalition government, and was appointed to a third term as Prime Minister on 17 November 2023.

== Early life and education ==
Pedro Sánchez Pérez-Castejón was born on 29 February 1972 in Madrid to well-off parents, Pedro Sánchez Fernández and Magdalena Pérez-Castejón. His father was a public administrator who spent most of his career at the Ministry of Culture's Instituto Nacional de las Artes Escénicas y de la Música (lit. 'National Institute of the Performing Arts and Music'). He later became the owner of an industrial packing company. His mother also worked as a civil servant, in the social security system, and later studied to become a lawyer, ultimately graduating alongside her son at the same university. Raised in the Tetuán district, he went on to study at the Colegio Santa Cristina. According to Sánchez himself, he frequented breakdancing circles in AZCA when he was a teenager. He moved from the Colegio Santa Cristina to the Instituto Ramiro de Maeztu, a public high school where he played basketball in the Estudiantes youth system, with links to the high school, reaching the U-21 team. As a teenager, Sánchez spent time in Dublin to learn English.

In 1993, Sánchez first joined the PSOE, following the victory of Felipe González in that year's general election. He earned a licentiate degree from the Real Colegio Universitario María Cristina, attached to the Complutense University of Madrid, in 1995. Following his graduation, he moved to New York City to work for a global consulting firm.

In 1998, Sánchez moved to Brussels to work for the PSOE's delegation to the European Parliament, including as an assistant to the MEP Bárbara Dührkop. He also spent time working in the staff of the United Nations High Representative for Bosnia and Herzegovina, Carlos Westendorp. Combining studies with his employment, he earned a second degree, in Politics and Economics, in 1998, graduating from the Université libre de Bruxelles. He also earned a degree in business leadership from IESE Business School in the University of Navarra, a private university and apostolate of the Opus Dei, and a diploma in Advanced Studies in EU Monetary Integration from the Instituto Ortega y Gasset in 2002. In 2012, Sánchez received his Doctorate in Economics from the Universidad Camilo José Cela, where he lectured in economics.

== Political career ==
=== Madrid councillor and member of parliament ===
In 2003, Sánchez stood for Madrid City Council as a PSOE candidate, under the local leadership of Trinidad Jiménez. He was 23rd on the proportional representation list, but missed out as the PSOE won only 21 seats. Sánchez joined the council a year later by co-option when two of the PSOE councillors resigned. He quickly rose to become a close confidante of Trinidad Jiménez, who sought the leadership of the council. In 2005, he was seconded to help lead the PSdG (PSOE's sister party in Galicia) campaign in the Galician regional election, which saw the PSdG win enough seats to allow their leader, Emilio Pérez Touriño, to become President of Galicia. As well as his career as a Madrid City Councillor, Sánchez also worked as a university lecturer at the Universidad Camilo José Cela (UCJC) in 2008, lecturing on Economic Structure and History of Economic Thought.

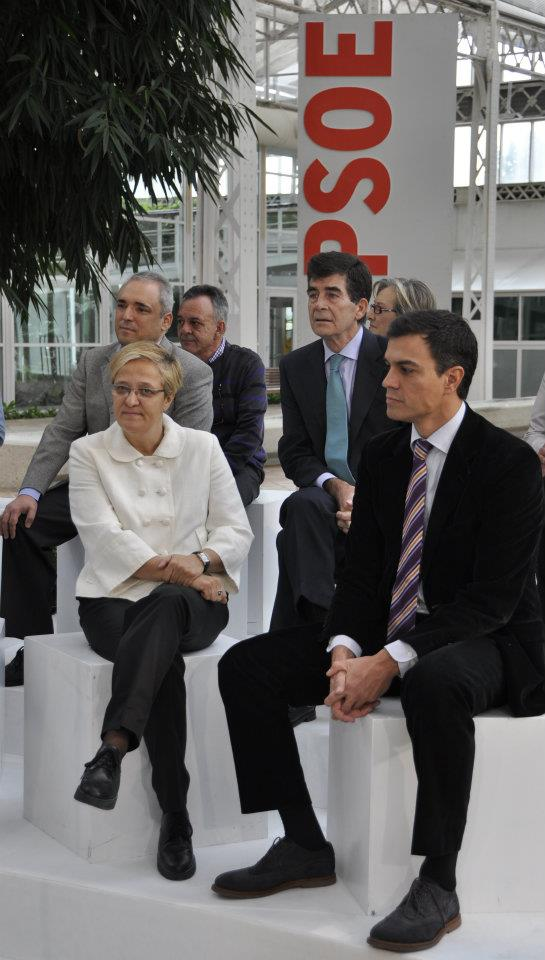
Sánchez during the PSOE's 2011 general election campaign

Via co-option, Sánchez was elected to the Spanish Congress of Deputies for Madrid to replace the retiring Pedro Solbes, who has served as Finance Minister under PSOE Prime Minister José Luis Rodríguez Zapatero. However, his first period in the Congress would be short, as at the 2011 general election, the PSOE suffered a large defeat and only elected 10 deputies for Madrid; with Sánchez 11th on the proportional list, he lost his seat in the Congress. He subsequently enrolled at the UCJC to study a Doctorate in Economics, earning his PHD 18 months later by writing a dissertation entitled Innovaciones de la diplomacia económica española: Análisis del sector público (2000–2012) (English translation: Innovations of Spanish Economic Diplomacy: Analysis of the Public Sector (2000–2012)), supervised by María Isabel Cepeda González. In 2018, Sánchez was accused by the ABC newspaper of plagiarism in his doctorate. Refuting the allegations, Sánchez published his full thesis online and presented an analysis using two plagiarism detection programs — Turnitin and PlagScan — claiming that his work "amply passed" both. However, Sanchez's claims were disputed by Markus Goldbach, CEO of PlagScan, whose checker software had been previously presented as disproving the plagiarism allegations. Days later, ABC reported that Sánchez had plagiarized six texts by other authors, totaling 161 lines.

In January 2013, Sánchez returned to Congress representing Madrid, replacing Cristina Narbona, who resigned to accept appointment at the Nuclear Safety Council. After the resignation of PSOE leader Alfredo Pérez Rubalcaba, following poor results at the 2014 European Parliament election, Sánchez launched his campaign to succeed him on 12 June 2014. He was elected as PSOE Secretary-General on 13 July, winning 49% of votes against his opponents Eduardo Madina and José Antonio Pérez Tapias. He was formally appointed Secretary-General after an Extraordinary Congress of the PSOE was held on 26 July to ratify the result, becoming Leader of the Opposition.

=== Leader of the Opposition ===
Presenting a platform based on political regeneration, Sánchez called for constitutional reforms establishing federalism as the form of administrative organization of Spain to ensure that Catalonia would remain within the country; a new progressive fiscal policy; extending the welfare state to all citizens; increasing the membership of labour unions to strengthen economic recovery; and regaining the confidence of former Socialist voters disenchanted by the measures taken by Zapatero during his term as prime minister amid an economic crisis. He also opposed the grand coalition model supported by the former PSOE Prime Minister Felipe González, who lobbied in favour of adopting a more German system to prevent political instability, by instructing his European party caucus not to support the consensus candidate Jean-Claude Juncker of the European People's Party for the role of President of the European Commission.

Upon taking office as PSOE's Secretary-General, Sánchez quickly faced a political crisis following the formation of a new left-wing party, Podemos. Polling approximated that 25% of PSOE supporters would switch their support to Podemos. Sánchez responded by pushing his proposed federal model to replace the devolution model, and calling for the further secularization of Spain's education system, including the removal of religious-affiliated public and private schools. He later named César Luena as his deputy leader. On Sunday, 21 June 2015, Sánchez was officially announced as the PSOE candidate for prime minister in the upcoming general election. At the election on 20 December, the PSOE won 90 seats, ahead of Podemos who won 69 seats, but coming second to the People's Party (PP), who won with 123 seats. As the PP could not form a government, Sánchez was formally requested by the King in January 2016 to attempt to form a coalition, but he could not win the support of a majority of representatives. This led to a snap general election in June 2016, where the PSOE lost several seats and remained second to the PP.

=== Resignation and comeback ===
Following the 2016 general election, Sánchez argued the PSOE should refuse to allow the PP to form a government, which would break the national political deadlock. Susana Díaz, the President of Andalusia, began to lead criticism of Sánchez's leadership, arguing that his hardline position on government formation was harming the party. After poor results for the PSOE in the September Basque and Galician regional elections, numerous PSOE figures followed Díaz in calling for Sánchez's resignation. The situation quickly developed into a party crisis, dubbed by some in the media as the "war of the roses", after Sánchez called a special PSOE congress for the autumn to settle the issue. This prompted half of the PSOE executive committee to resign, and on Saturday, 1 October 2016, Sánchez lost a vote in the PSOE federal committee to support his proposals for an autumn congress; he immediately resigned as Secretary-General and was replaced by an interim "caretaker committee" while a fresh leadership election could be organized.

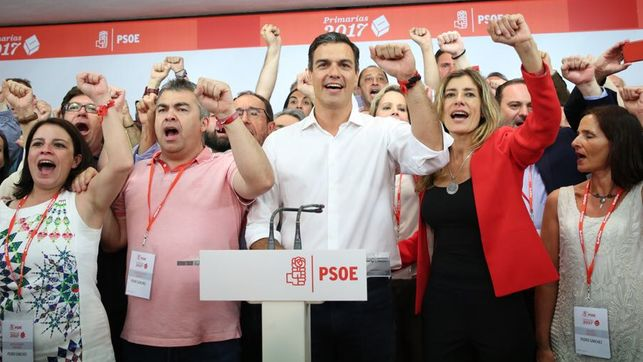
Sánchez, after winning re-election as Secretary-General, singing The Internationale

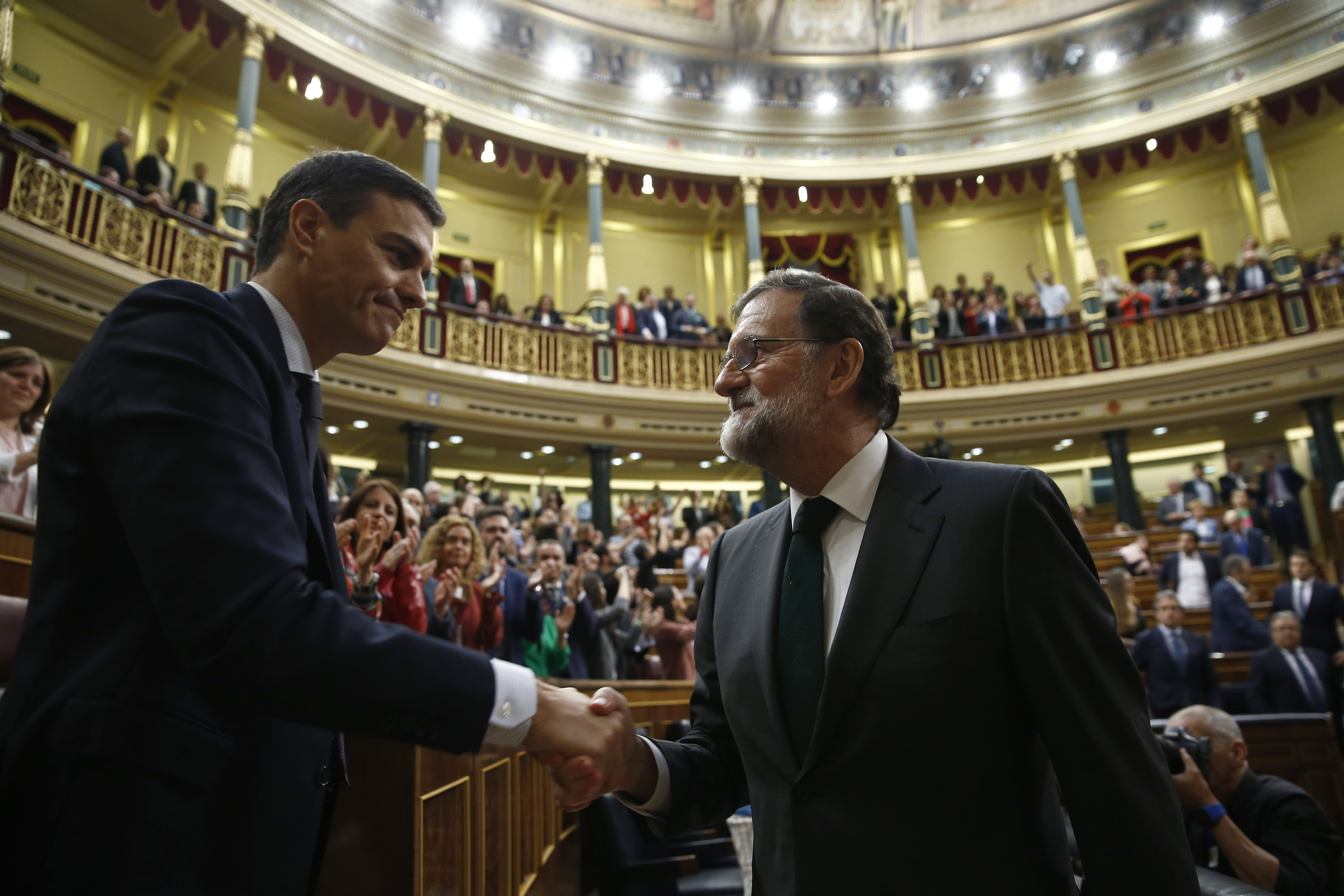
Rajoy congratulates Sánchez on his successful no-confidence motion.

Soon after his resignation, the PSOE caretaker committee decided to abstain in the investiture vote, which would enable the PP's Mariano Rajoy to be re-elected as prime minister. Saying that he could not obey this directive as it would mean "betraying his word" not to allow Rajoy to be re-elected, Sánchez resigned his seat in the Congress of Deputies, and declared he would stand in the upcoming leadership election. 15 PSOE MPs broke party discipline in response, by refusing to abstain in the investiture vote and voting against Rajoy, (Note: Meritxell Batet, Marc Lamuà, Manuel Cruz Rodríguez, María Mercè Perea, Lídia Guinart, Joan Ruiz, José Zaragoza, Margarita Robles, Zaida Cantera, Odón Elorza, Pere Joan Pons, Sofía Hernanz, María del Rocío de Frutos, Susana Sumelzo and María Luz Martínez Seijo) yet as Rajoy only needed an abstention from 11 PSOE MPs out of 84, he easily won the vote to be invested as prime minister.

After resigning as Secretary-General and from the Congress, Sánchez began a national tour, driving his own car around to visit party members throughout different parts of Spain. After an energetic campaign, during which he criticized the caretaker committee for allowing the investiture of Rajoy, on Sunday, 21 May 2017, Sánchez was re-elected Secretary-General by the party membership, taking 50.2% of the vote, and defeating his rival Susana Díaz, who took 39.94%, as well as Patxi López, who won 9.85%; his position was affirmed at a PSOE executive meeting on 17 June, and the following day he was confirmed as Leader of the Opposition, despite no longer holding a seat in the Congress.

As Leader of the Opposition, Sánchez joined Mariano Rajoy in opposing the 2017 Catalan independence referendum, and supported the Spanish Government's decision to dismiss the Catalan Government and impose direct rule on Catalonia in October 2017 following the crisis. Throughout 2017 and 2018, the Gürtel trial caused controversy for the Rajoy Government; finally, after critical verdicts were announced in May 2018, Sánchez announced that the PSOE would file a motion of no confidence against Rajoy. Under the Spanish Constitution, such motions are constructive, meaning those bringing the motion must simultaneously propose a replacement candidate for prime minister. If the motion carries, the replacement candidate is automatically deemed to have the confidence of the Congress and ascends as prime minister. Accordingly, the PSOE nominated Sánchez as the alternative prime minister. Sánchez led negotiations with other political parties, and ultimately secured the support of enough minor parties in the Congress to guarantee passage of the motion. On Friday, 1 June 2018, 180 Deputies supported the motion of no confidence, clearing the required threshold of 176, forcing Rajoy's resignation. Rajoy recommended Sánchez as his successor.

== Premiership (2018–present) ==
=== First term ===
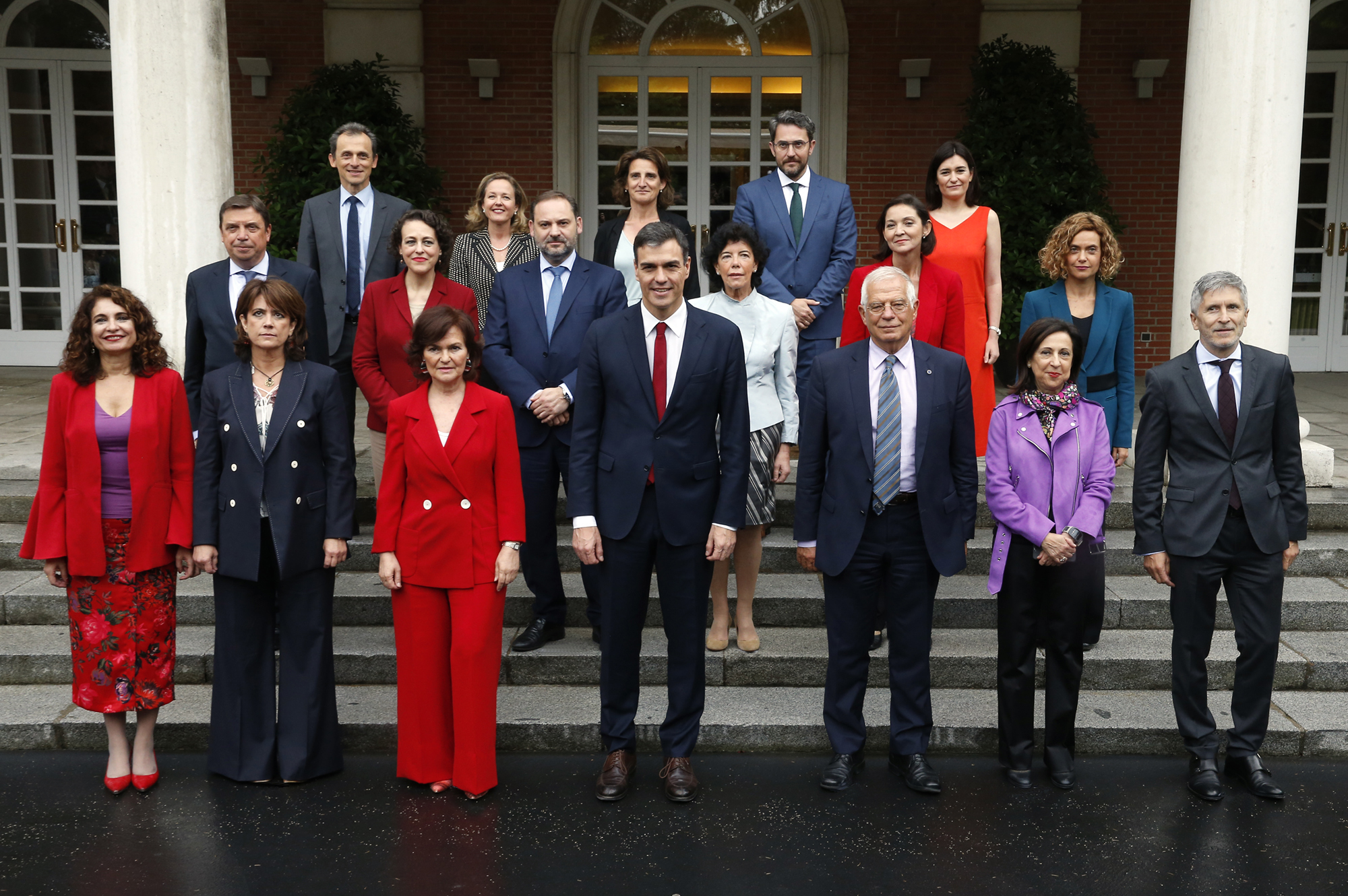
Sánchez and his Cabinet at La Moncloa in June 2018

Sánchez was formally installed as Prime Minister of Spain by King Felipe VI on 2 June 2018. Outlining his priorities, Sánchez said he would form a short-term government that would increase unemployment benefit and propose a law guaranteeing equal pay between the sexes, before dissolving the Congress of Deputies and holding a general election. However, he also said he would uphold the 2018 budget that had already been passed by the Rajoy Government, a condition that the Basque Nationalist Party required to vote for the motion of no confidence. Sánchez also announced he would only propose other measures if they had considerable parliamentary support, re-affirming his government's compliance with the EU deficit requirements. Sánchez, an atheist, swore his oath of office to the Spanish Constitution, so no Bible or crucifix was used for the first time in modern Spanish history.

==== Domestic policy ====
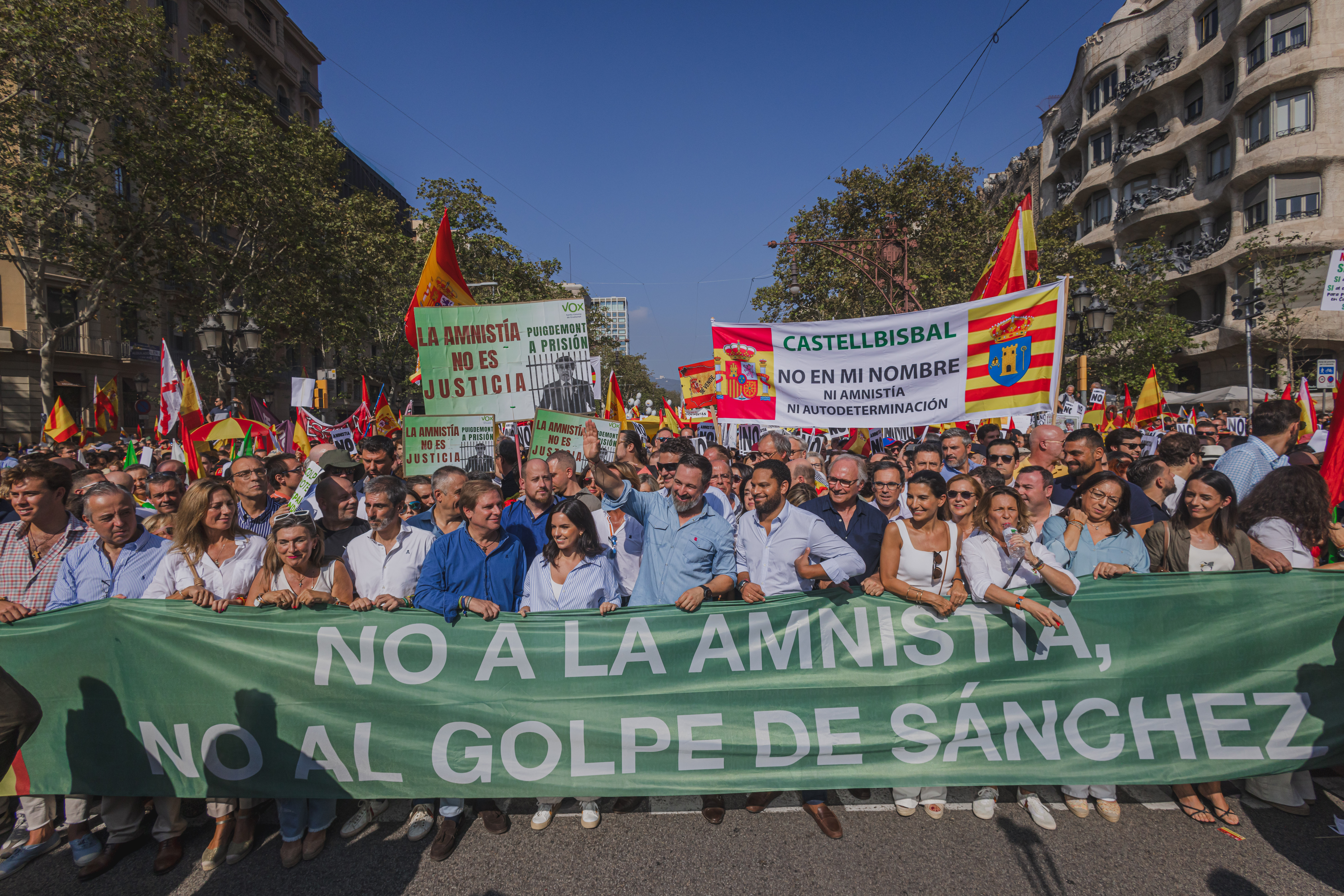
2023 Spanish protests

On 18 June 2018, the Sánchez Government announced its intention to remove the remains of former dictator Francisco Franco from the Valley of the Fallen. On 24 August the Cabinet approved a decree modifying two aspects of the 2007 Historical Memory Law to allow for the exhumation of Franco's remains from the Valley of the Fallen. After a year of legal battles with Franco's descendants, the exhumation took place on 24 October 2019, and Franco was reburied at Mingorrubio Cemetery in El Pardo with his wife Carmen Polo.

After the 2019 sentence of Catalonian independence leaders, Sánchez confirmed his government's support of the sentence, and denied the possibility of any pardon, proclaiming that the sentence should be served by the convicts in its entirety. Sánchez would, however, eventually grant a partial pardon to most convicts in 2021, stressing that despite the pardon there would never be a referendum for the independence of Catalonia, with then Spokesperson María Jesús Montero that "We will not renounce, as a government, to do what we think is best for our country, its coexistence, stability and progress" and the Catalan conflict needs "that the word, dialogue, coexistence and the capacity for reunion take on a leading role that should never have been lost".

Following the 2023 general election, the Congress of Deputies passed the Organic Law 1/2024, of 10 June, of amnesty for the institutional, political, and social normalization in Catalonia, a requirement for his 2023 investiture by Catalan pro-independence parties Together for Catalonia and Republican Left of Catalonia, which aimed at pardoning all those sentenced or prosecuted between 2011 and 2023 for Catalan independence, becoming the second amnesty law after the 1977 Spanish Amnesty Law. However, by August 2024, no politician had benefitted from the law.

==== Foreign policy ====
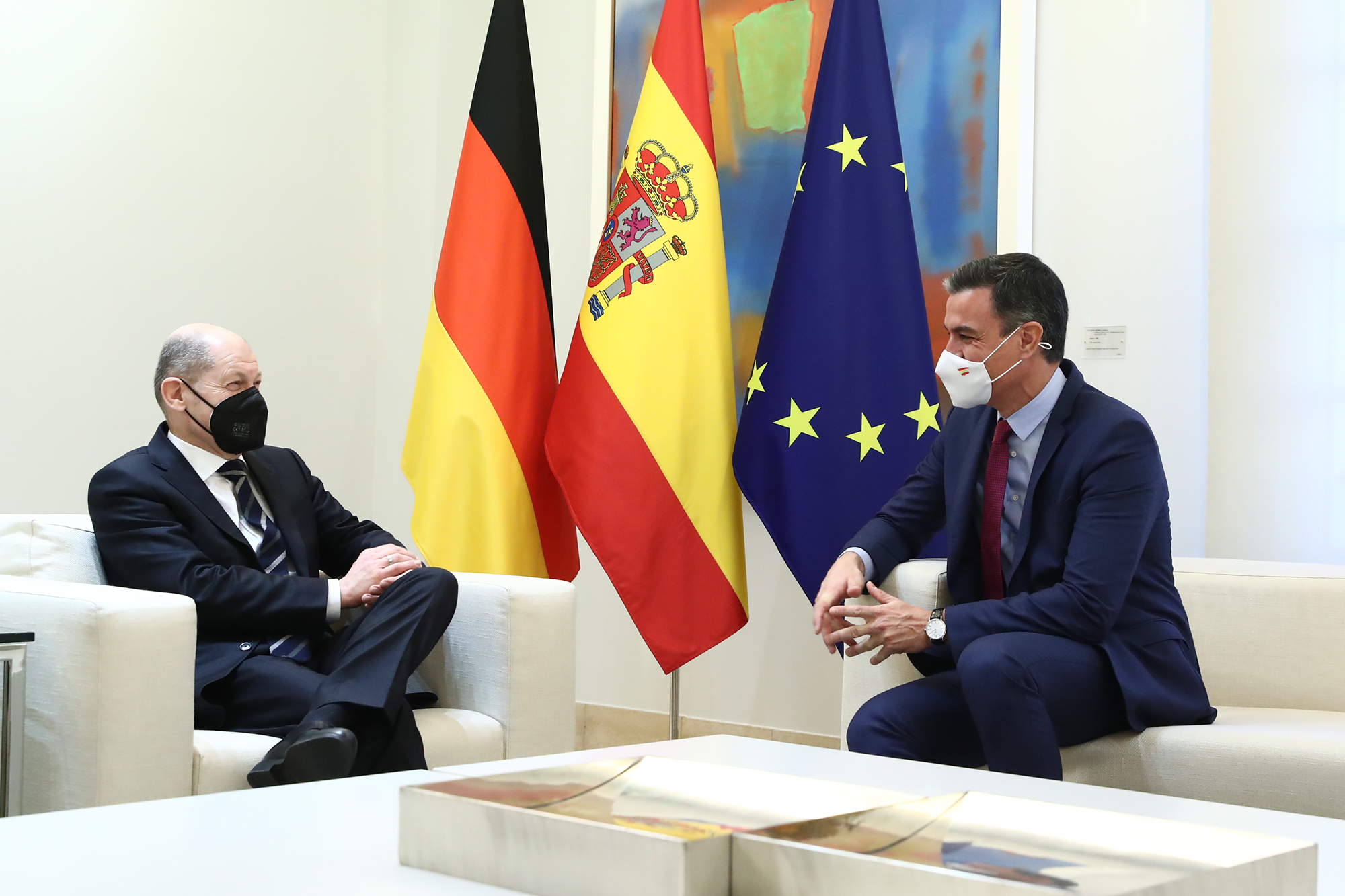
Sánchez with German Chancellor Olaf Scholz at the Moncloa Palace in Madrid, 17 January 2022

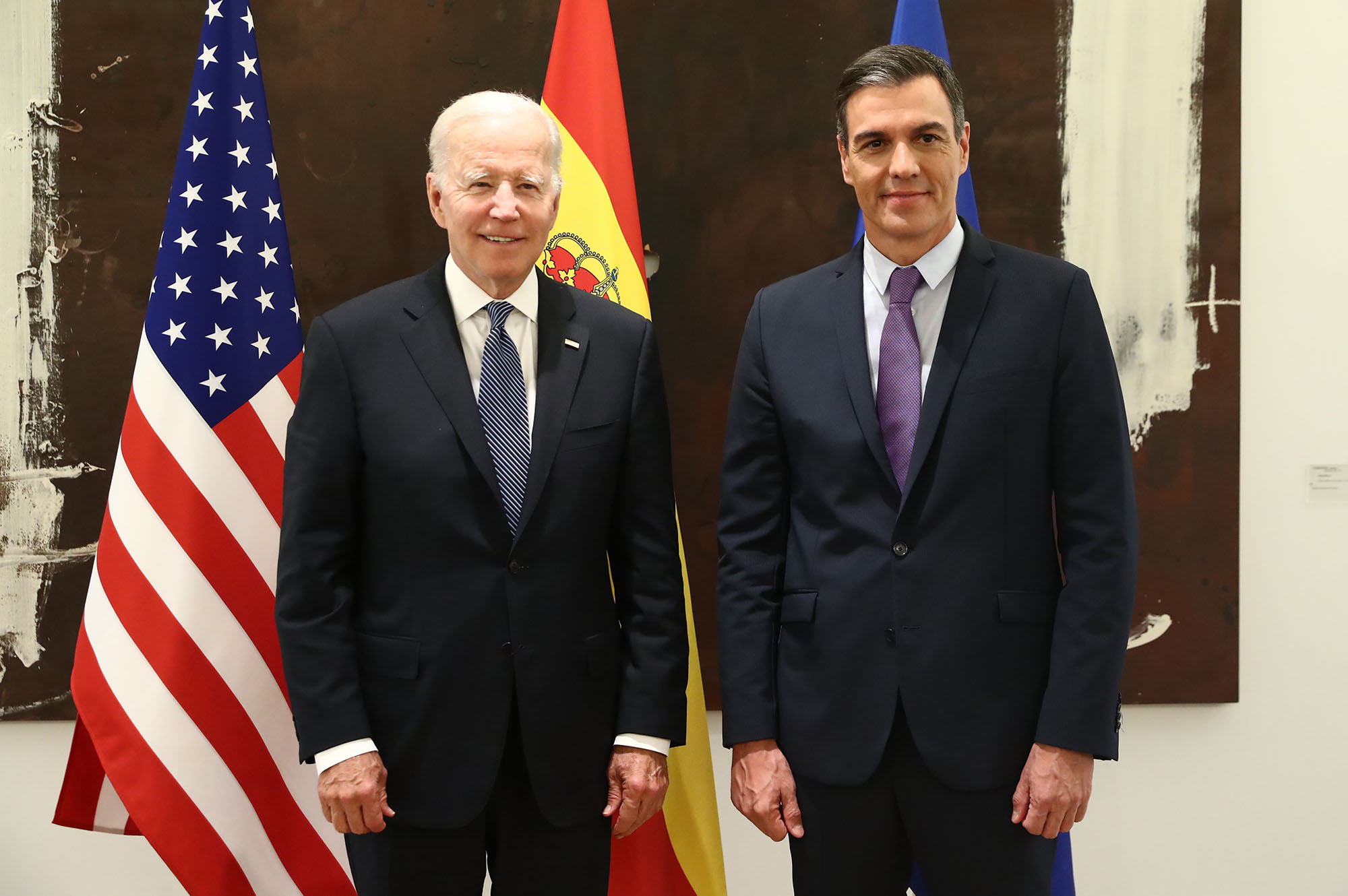
Sánchez with US President Joe Biden in Madrid, Spain, 28 June 2022

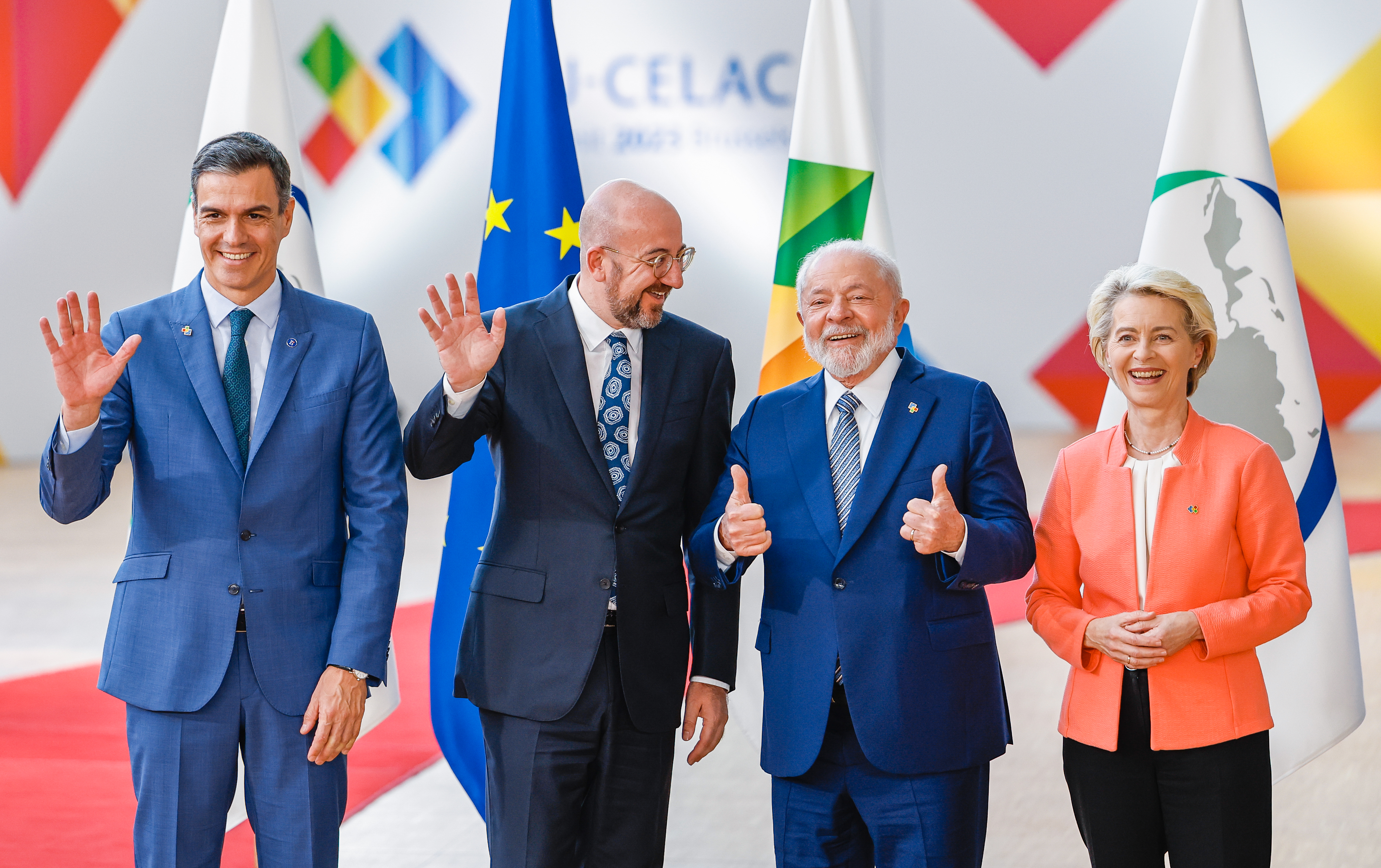
Sánchez with the President of the European Council Charles Michel, Brazilian President Luiz Inácio Lula da Silva and European Commission President Ursula von der Leyen, 17 July 2023

Sánchez took a very active role in the international sphere, particularly in the European Union, saying that "Spain has to claim its role" and declaring himself "a militant pro-European". On 16 January 2019, in a speech before the European Parliament, he said that the EU should be protected and turned into a global actor, and that a more social Europe is needed, with a strong monetary union. He stated in a speech in March 2019 that the enemies of Europe are "inside of the European Union". During his second government, he continued strengthening the pro-European profile of his ministers, including by appointing José Luis Escrivá, the Chair of the Independent Authority for Fiscal Responsibility and former chair of the EU Independent Fiscal Institutions Network, as his Minister for Social Security. In June 2020, the Sánchez Government proposed Deputy Prime Minister and Economy Minister Nadia Calviño to be the next Chair of the Eurogroup.

In September 2018, Defence Minister Margarita Robles cancelled sales of laser-guided bombs to Saudi Arabia over concerns relating to the Saudi Arabian-led intervention in Yemen. Overruling Robles, Sánchez ordered the sale to proceed, allegedly due to a promise made to Susana Díaz to help protect jobs in the shipyards of the Bay of Cádiz, highly dependent on the €1.813 billion contract with Saudi Arabia to deliver five corvettes. In response to the killing of Saudi dissident journalist Jamal Khashoggi in October 2018, Sánchez defended the decision to continue arms sales to Saudi Arabia and insisted on his government's "responsibility" to protect jobs in the arms industry.

=== Second term ===
Under Sánchez's premiership, the Congress approved a total central government budget of 196 billion euros – the biggest budget in the country's history – in 2021, after he had won the support of the Catalan pro-independence Republican Left of Catalonia. Following the fall of Kabul and the subsequent de facto creation of the Islamic Emirate of Afghanistan, the Prime Minister offered Spain as a hub for Afghans who collaborated with the European Union, who would later be settled in various countries.

The Spanish Government created a temporary refugee camp in the air base of Torrejón de Ardoz, which was later visited by officials from the European Union, including President of the European Commission Ursula von der Leyen and President of the European Council Charles Michel. Von der Leyen praised the Sánchez Government's initiative, stating that the actions of Spain represented "a good example of the European soul at its best". US President Joe Biden spoke with Sánchez to allow the use of the military bases of Rota and Morón to temporarily accommodate Afghan refugees, while praising "Spain's leadership in seeking international support for Afghan women and girls". Sánchez condemned the Russian invasion of Ukraine and expressed Spain's full support for Ukraine. In August 2022, during his state visit to Serbia as part of his overall visits to Balkan countries, Sánchez reaffirmed Spain's non-recognition of the independence of Kosovo.

==== COVID-19 pandemic ====
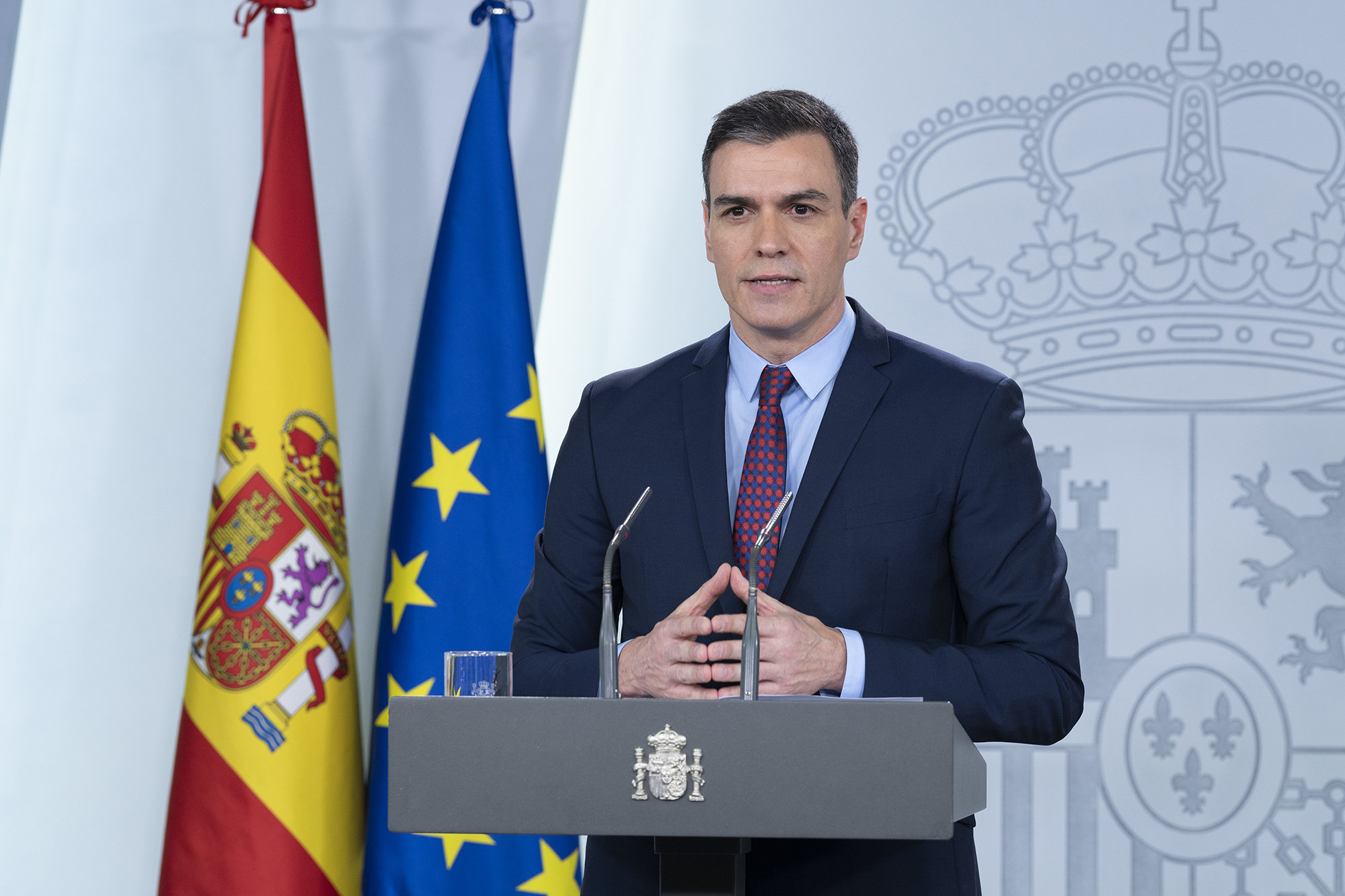
Sánchez announcing the state of alarm on 13 March 2020

In response to the COVID-19 pandemic, on 13 March 2020, Sánchez announced a declaration of a national state of alarm, for only the second time in Spain's democratic history, and the first time for such a period. The Cabinet agreed a nationwide lockdown, banning all trips that were not force majeure, and announced it may intervene in companies to guarantee supplies. In July 2021, the Constitutional Court of Spain, acting upon the 2020 appeal by Vox, sentenced by a narrow majority (6 votes in support versus 5 against) that the state of alarm was unconstitutional in the part of suppressing the freedom of movement established by the Article 19 of the Constitution of Spain.

=== Third term ===
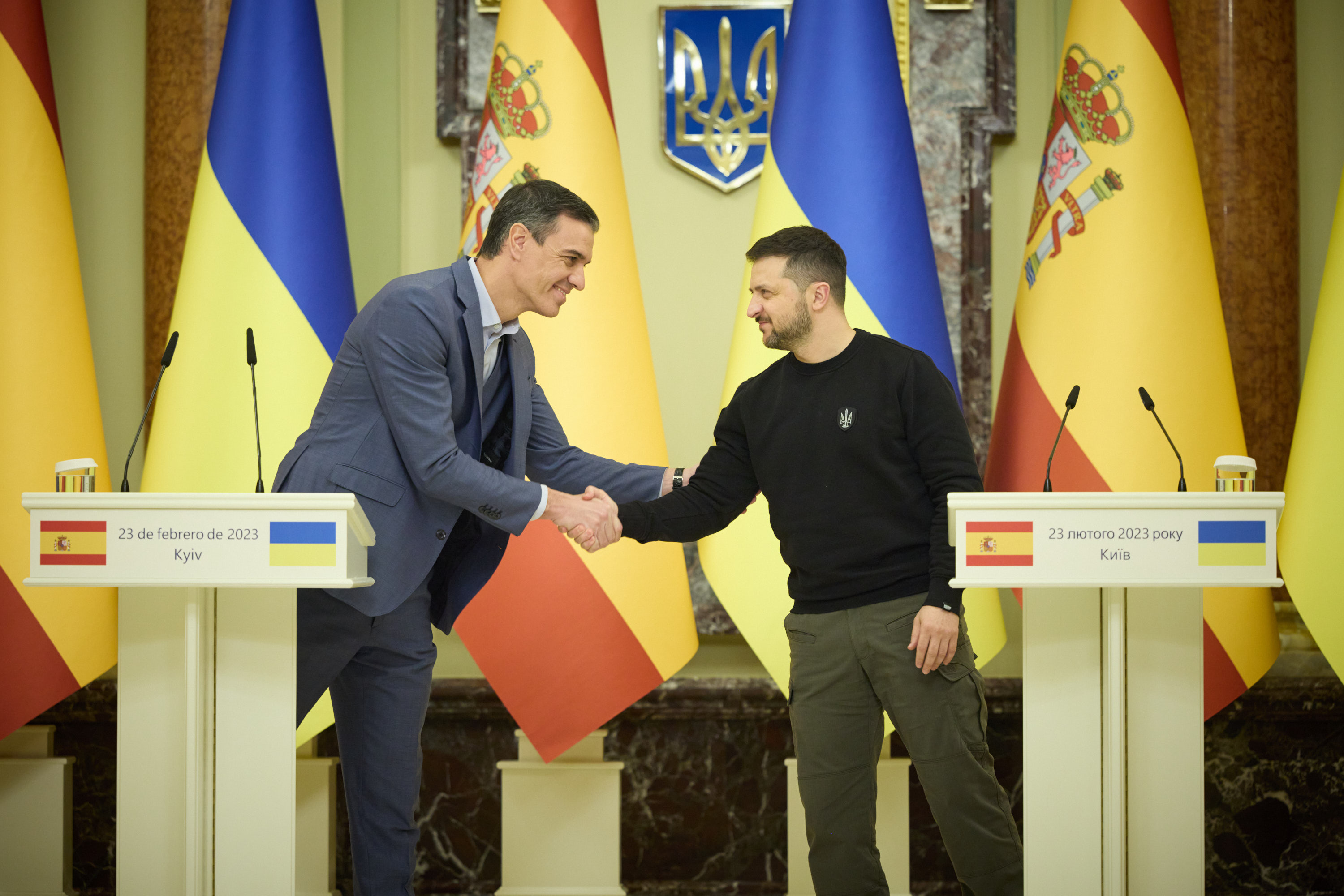
Sánchez with Ukrainian President Volodymyr Zelenskyy in Kyiv, Ukraine, 23 February 2023

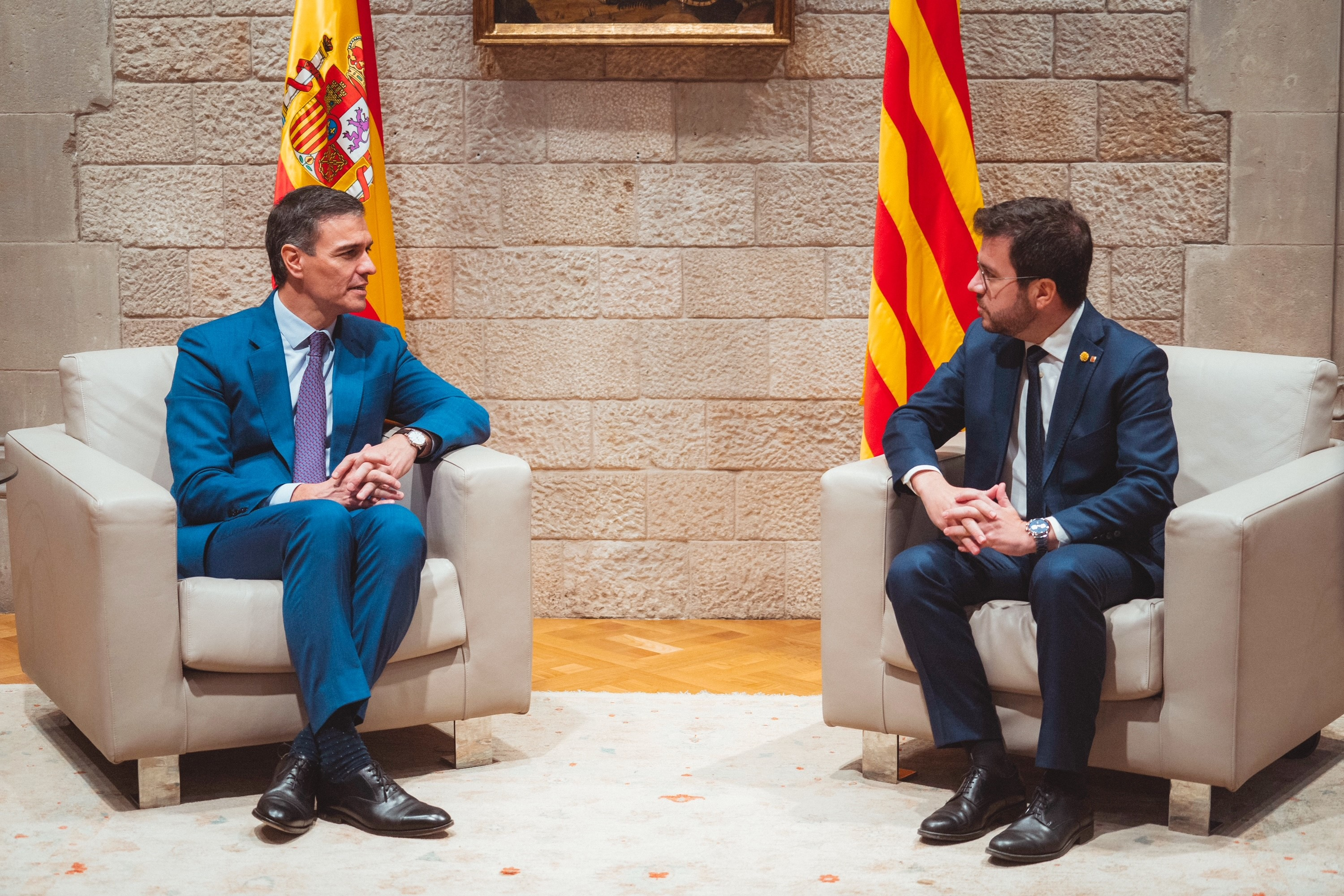
Sánchez with Catalonia's President Pere Aragonès in December 2023

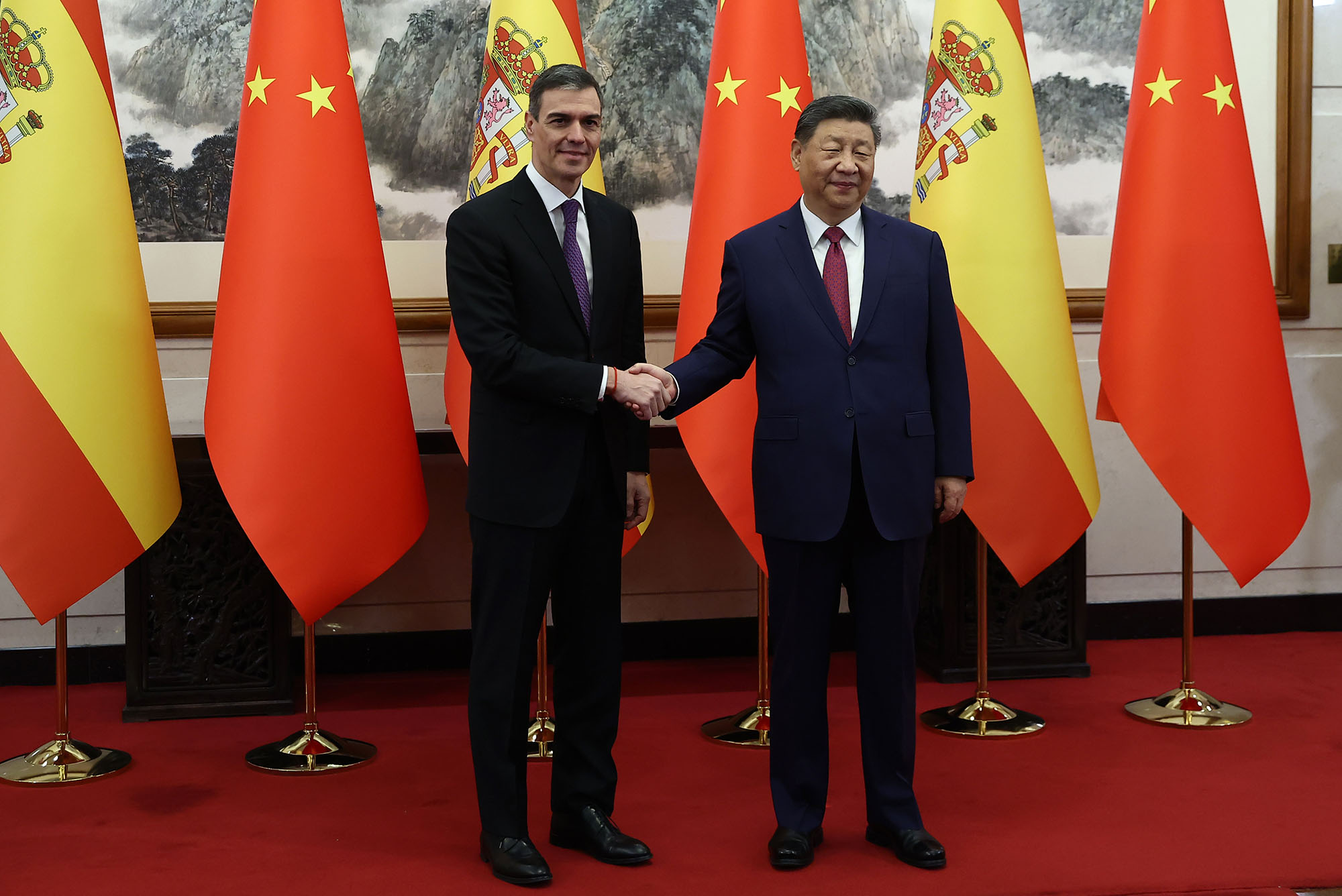
Sánchez with Chinese President Xi Jinping in Beijing, China, 11 April 2025

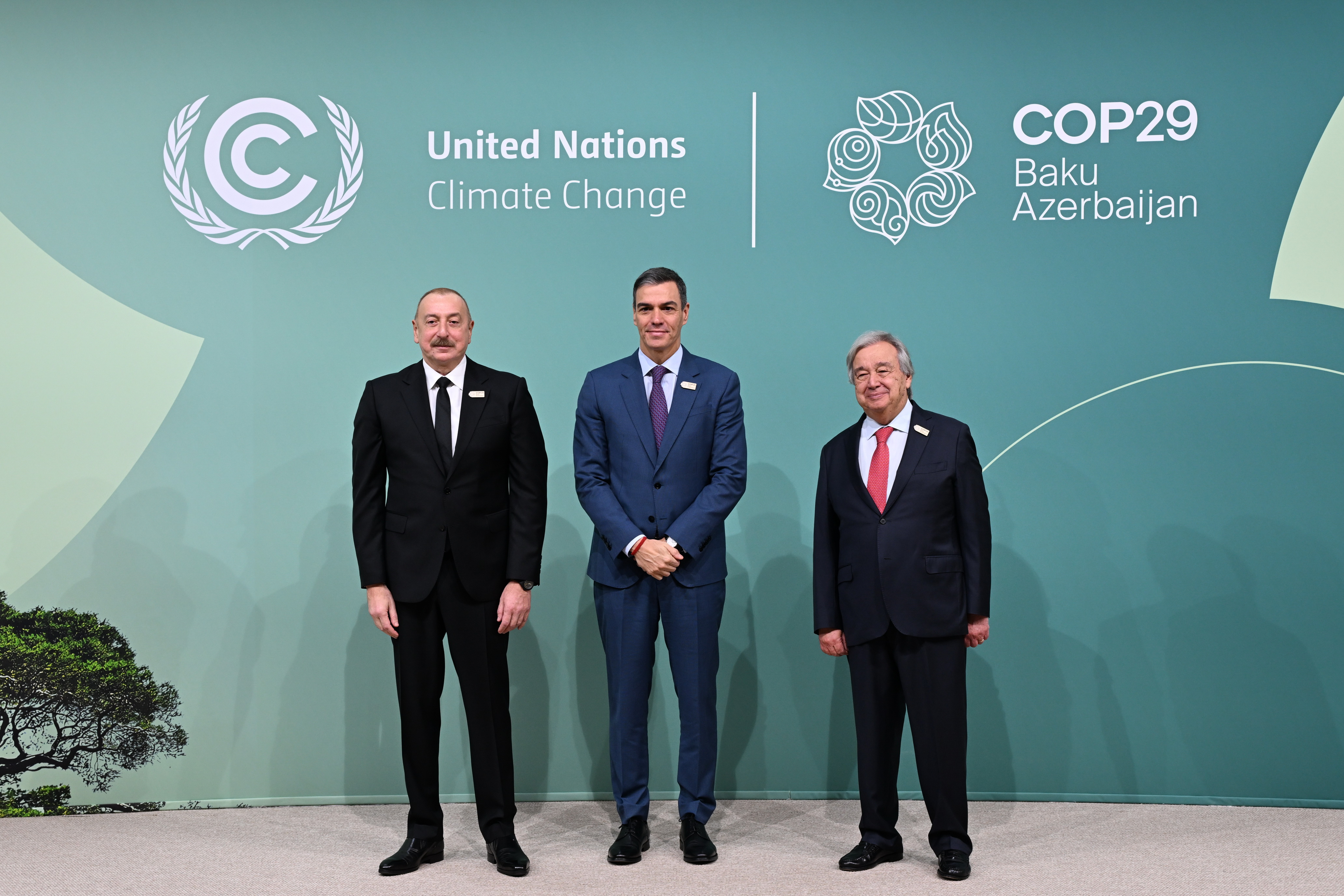
Sánchez, Ilham Aliyev and António Guterres at COP29 in Baku, Azerbaijan, 12 November 2024

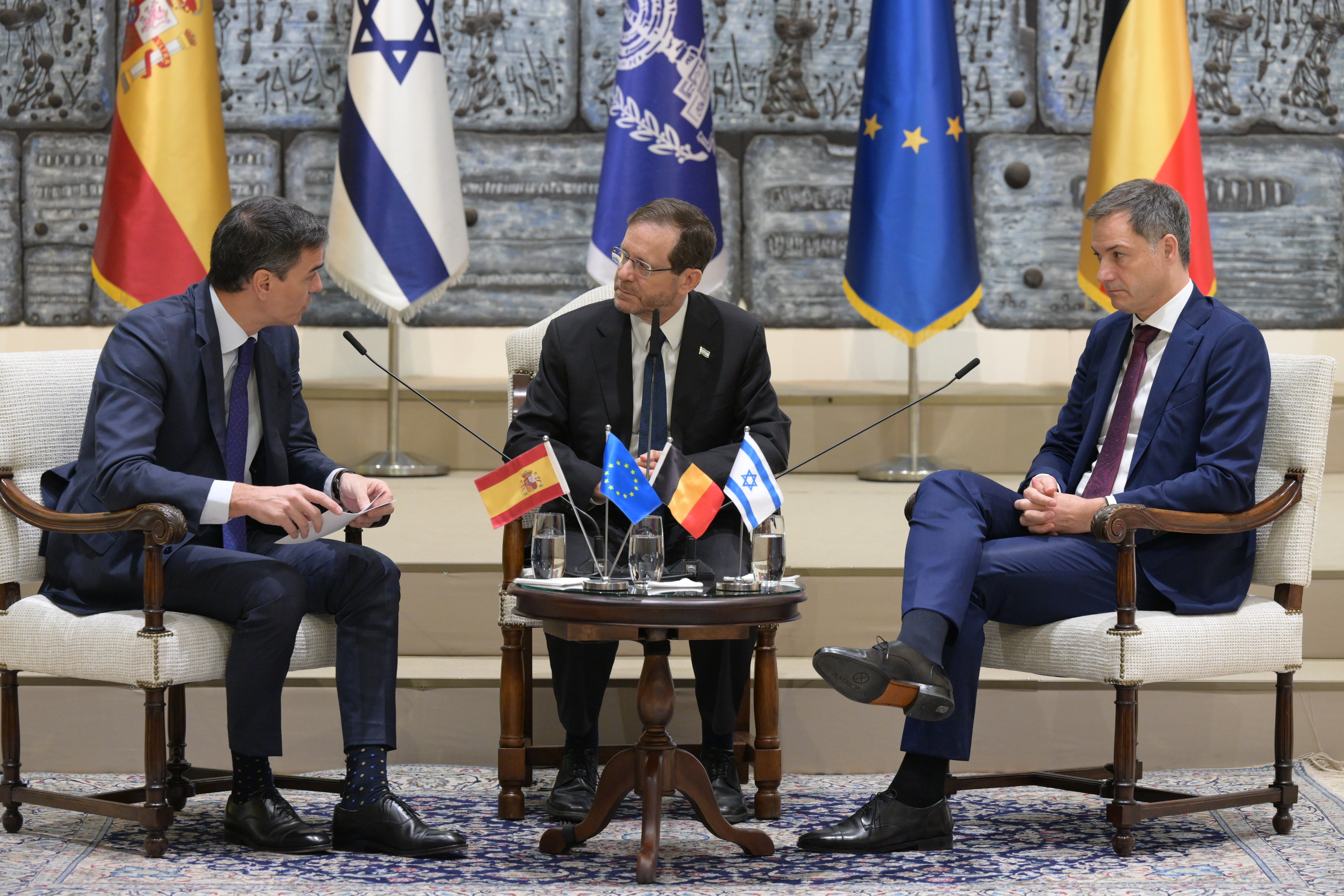
Sánchez with Israeli President Isaac Herzog and Belgian Prime Minister Alexander De Croo in Jerusalem, Israel, 23 November 2023

In 2023, after the PSOE suffered heavy losses in a series of regional and local elections across Spain with the PP and Vox winning a large number of seats, Sánchez surprised many by announcing a snap general election for 23 July. In a speech confirming the election, Sánchez stated that it was important to listen to the will of the people, but stressed the need to persevere with post-COVID economic recovery measures implemented by his government, and that he would seek to prevent the formation a PP-Vox Government.

At the election, the PP gained 48 seats, finishing first, but the PSOE gained one seat, and Vox lost over one third of its seats; this meant that PP leader Alberto Núñez Feijóo was not able to form a government. After the Congress of Deputies formally rejected Feijóo's bid to be invested in September 2023, King Felipe VI appointed Sánchez to form a government. After obtaining the support of the left-wing Sumar alliance, as well as a series of pro-independence and regionalist political parties, the Congress of Deputies re-elected Sánchez as Prime Minister on 16 November 2023; he was formally appointed to a third term on 17 November 2023.

Following weeks of political tensions, which saw Sánchez accepting an amnesty law for Catalan pro-independence politicians convicted or investigated for events related to the 2017–2018 Spanish constitutional crisis and the 2019 Catalan protests, he was able to secure enough support to be re-elected as prime minister by an absolute majority on 16 November 2023. Sánchez's re-election and amnesty law proposal sparked protests.

Sánchez has been supportive of legal immigration to Spain as a way to foster economic growth and sustaining the country's welfare state. On 9 October 2024, Sánchez urged the European Parliament to speed up the implementation of the New Pact on Migration and Asylum to alleviate the migration crisis in the Canary Islands, which had seen the illegal arrival of a record number of 46,843 migrants, mostly from Senegal, Mali and Morocco (up from 39,910 in 2023). Sánchez tried to push through a law that would introduce mandatory distribution of migrants among Spanish regions to alleviate pressure in the Canary Islands. The Sánchez government aimed to legalize approximately 900,000 undocumented migrants by 2027.

In January 2026, Sánchez authorized a royal decree aimed at regularizing approximately 500,000 undocumented immigrants residing in Spain. The move has been criticized by the opposition as undemocratic. Spain's immigration policy, which contrasts with other advanced European nations, contributed to its becoming the world's fastest growing advanced economy. However, the influx in immigration has put pressure on housing costs and infrastructure in urban areas. Sánchez's government has sought to remedy this by enticing immigrants to move to rural areas whose economies cannot be sustained due to population loss. On July 2026, almost 1.2 million of Spain's undocumented migrants appled for legal status. More than twice the expected number of 500,000.

In July 2026, 72,000 Moroccan migrants stormed the beaches of Cueta, Spain. Sanchez was criticized for the slow response and the ease to which Spanish resources were overwhelmed. In response Italy temporarily reimposed border controls on Spain usually non-existent for countries in the free travel Schengen zone. Months after the incident, thousands of migrants remained on Spanish soil.

On 3 November 2024, Sánchez, King Felipe, Queen Letizia and Valencian president Carlos Mazón were violently confronted during a meeting with people affected by the October 2024 Spain floods in Paiporta in the Valencian Community, who threw mud and objects at them and injured two bodyguards.

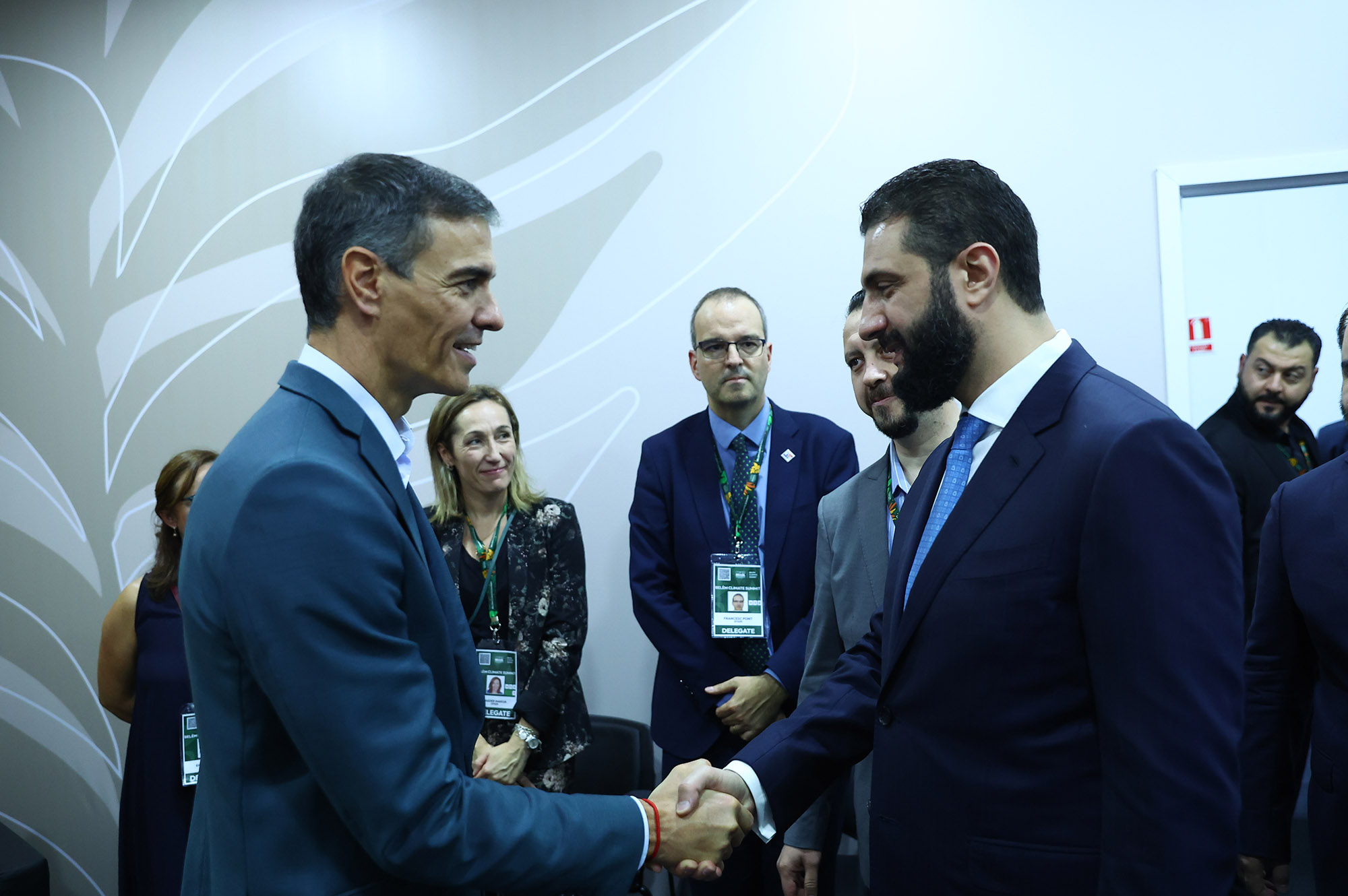
Sánchez with Syrian President Ahmed al-Sharaa during the COP30 summit in Brazil, 7 November 2025

On 18 January 2026, Sánchez cancelled his planned trip to the World Economic Forum in Davos to visit the site of a fatal train collision in Adamuz, southern Spain, which resulted in more than 40 deaths. On 3 February 2026, Sánchez announced at the World Governments Summit in Dubai plans to prohibit users under the age of 16 from accessing social media platforms. On 5 October 2026 Sanchez has dissolved parliament and called an early election to take place on Sunday, 29 November 2026.

==== Foreign policy ====
Sánchez criticized Israel's actions in the Gaza Strip during the Gaza war. He promised to "work in Europe and in Spain to recognise the Palestinian state". Along with Leo Varadkar of Ireland, he has been widely recognized as one of the most pro-Palestine voices and critics with the Israeli actions within the European Union. Spain officially recognized the State of Palestine on 28 May 2024, with the borders established in 1967, in coordination with Ireland and Norway. On 6 June 2024 Spain joined South Africa's genocide case against Israel. Speaking at the Washington summit in July 2024, Sánchez urged NATO members to avoid "double standards" regarding the wars in Ukraine and Gaza, saying, "If we demand respect for international law in Ukraine, we must demand it in Gaza as well."

Spain's Congress of Deputies recognized Edmundo González as the winner of the 2024 Venezuelan presidential election. Sánchez said he would recognise neither Nicolás Maduro nor Edmundo González as the winner and would look for a solution to the dispute using diplomacy.

In May 2025, Sánchez called Israel a "genocidal state" and said that Spain "does not do business" with such a country. In September 2025, he remarked: "Spain does not have nuclear bombs. We cannot stop the Israeli offensive alone, but we will not stop trying". On 4 January 2026, Sánchez condemned the US military intervention in Venezuela, during which President Nicolás Maduro was captured. While affirming that Spain did not recognize Maduro's regime as legitimate, he characterized the intervention as a dangerous precedent and a violation of international law. He has been outspoken in criticizing the United States and Israel in the 2026 Iran war from early on, unlike many other European leaders who have "tried to assuage Trump with a combination of flattery and accommodation". He said the US and Israeli strikes were "reckless and illegal". Pedro Sánchez's oposition to the war escalated after Madrid refused to allow the United States to use the Rota and Morón military bases in its offensive against the Iranian government. In response, U.S. President Donald Trump threatened to sever bilateral trade relations.Pedro Sánchez responded by saying it was "curious" that Russia and the United States are permanent members of the Security Council despite "bringing a lot of instability to the world with the wars in Ukraine and also in Iran".

==== Dispute over rate of defence spending ====
Sánchez has a dispute with the United States regarding the US demand that NATO members increase their defence spending from 2% to 5% of GDP. In October 2025, Trump suggested that Spain should be thrown out of NATO over that issue. Sánchez said the higher target was "incompatible with our welfare state and our world vision".

==== Scandals ====
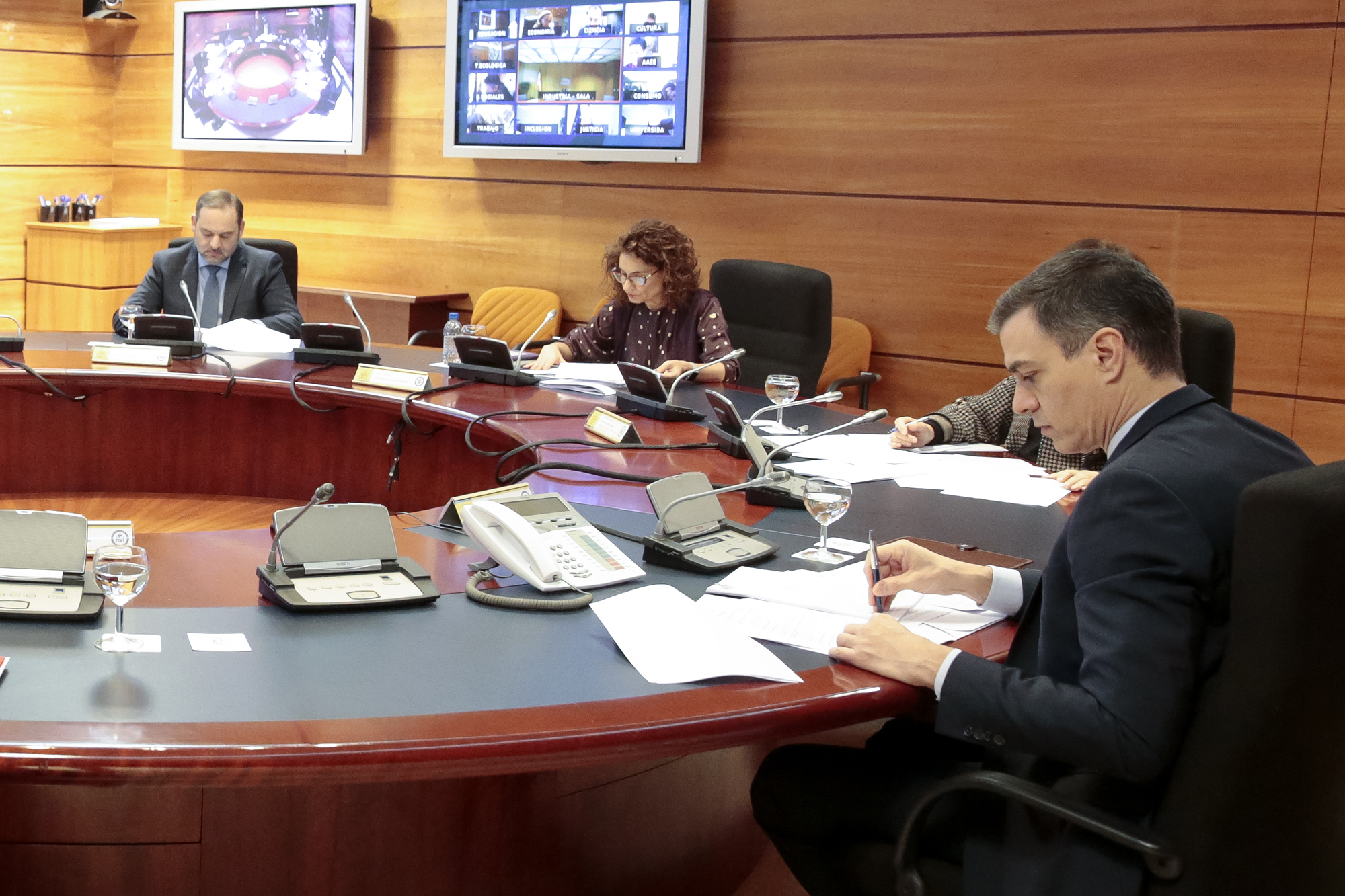
José Luis Ábalos (left), María Jesús Montero and Pedro Sánchez in March 2020

The Koldo Case is a significant corruption scandal in Spain that emerged in early 2024, involving allegations of illegal commissions related to COVID-19 mask procurement contracts. The scandal has notably impacted Pedro Sánchez's government, with prominent figures such as former Transport Minister José Luis Ábalos and his aide Koldo García facing trial and detention on charges including bribery, embezzlement, and racketeering. The case has also been linked to other controversies, such as the "Delcygate" scandal and investigations into Sánchez's wife, Begoña Gómez, and his brother.

On 24 April 2024, due to a court investigation of his wife, Begoña Gómez, for alleged influence peddling charges presented by Manos Limpias, a far-right proxy trade union, Sánchez announced through a letter in the X social network that he was considering his resignation from the position of prime minister, citing a right-wing media offensive to wear him down. Several media outlets noted how Manos Limpias' charges against Sánchez's wife were based on press headlines and fake news, a fact that the trade union acknowledged as possible. On 26 April 2024 and in a joint investigation, elDiario.es, El País and La Vanguardia newspapers revealed a plot by the PP, dating back to Mariano Rajoy's government in 2014, to spy and produce information on Sánchez's and Gómez's relatives to "politically kill him" by using Manos Limpias to present criminal charges. On 27 April, thousands gathered outside the PSOE's headquarters in Calle Ferraz, Madrid, in an effort to persuade Sánchez not to resign. The case has drawn comparisons to António Costa's resignation in Portugal over the Operation Influencer investigation, which attracted criticism for several mistakes. On 29 April, Sánchez announced that he would not be resigning despite a "harassment and bullying operation" and that he would be fighting "even harder" as prime minister.

As a result of Manos Limpias' complaint, Gómez has been under investigation for alleged crimes of influence peddling and corruption in business, with the judge, Juan Carlos Peinado, deciding during the 2024 European Parliament election campaign—and without waiting to take testimony from witnesses—to call her to testify on 5 July 2024, though this was later postponed to 19 July. She invoked her right not to testify. Sánchez replied by accusing opposition leaders Alberto Núñez Feijóo and Santiago Abascal of trying to influence the outcome of the European Parliament elections on 9 June by using his wife's situation against him, while claiming that the unwritten rule of not issuing judicial resolutions that could affect the normal development of an electoral campaign and the vote had not been followed this time. Through a new ruling, judge Peinado replied to Sánchez by arguing that there was no law in Spain preventing him from continuing his investigation during the electoral period; this was promptly criticized by the Spanish government, which responded that "rulings are not to attack anyone".

On 15 July 2024, businessman Juan Carlos Barrabés testified and stated that Begoña Gómez had met with him up to eight times at the Palace of Moncloa, the prime minister's official residence and workplace. Pedro Sánchez was said to be also present at two of these meetings, but no other details were offered other than his presence in one of them being a brief "greeting" and another one being in the context of a round of meetings with innovation businessmen. On 22 July, the judge summoned Pedro Sánchez to testify as a witness, but he exercised his right not to testify as the husband of the person under investigation. Vox denounced Pedro Sánchez and the Minister of Justice for using the State Attorney's Office against the judge investigating his wife; as of November 2024, the Supreme Court accumulated the complaints of Vox, Hazte Oir and Iustitia Europa against Sánchez and her wife before deciding whether to investigate them or not. On 13 April 2026, Gómez was formally charged with embezzlement, influence peddling, corruption in business dealings and misappropriation of funds.

In 2025, Sánchez's Spanish Socialist Workers' Party (PSOE) was embroiled in a series of sexual misconduct allegations that significantly undermined its feminist image and adversely affected its electoral support. The scandal intensified in July 2025 when Francisco Salazar, a close advisor to Sánchez and a senior party official at the Moncloa Palace, resigned following allegations of sexual harassment by female employees. By December 2025, further allegations emerged involving multiple other party members, including the party leader in Torremolinos, the mayor of Belalcázar, the party's deputy secretary in the province of Valencia, and the president of the province of Lugo. At his year-end press conference on 15 December 2025, Sánchez was accused of downplaying the impact of corruption and sexual misconduct allegations within the PSOE and his government, while insisting he would complete his term through 2027.

In 2020, the aircraft of Venezuelan vice-president Delcy Rodríguez landed at Madrid airport. The event was controversial because EU sanctions prohibited her from entering the EU. During the 81st Session of the United Nations General Assembly, Rodríguez spoke with Sánchez. According to Venezuelan dissident media outlet EVTV, Sanchez' government and the Venezuelan government of Nicolás Maduro maintained a direct channel of confidential communication.

== Ideology ==
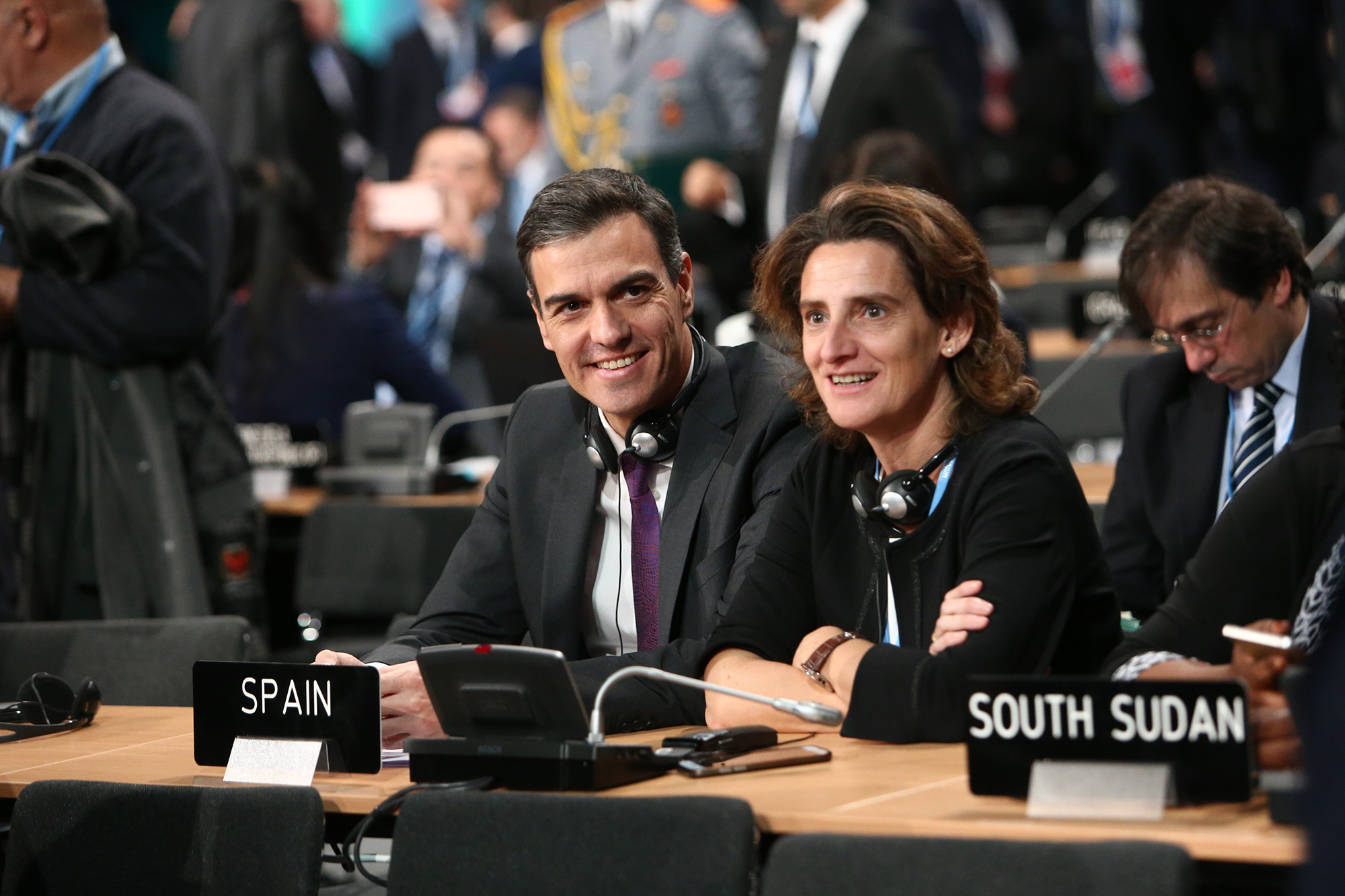
Sánchez and Minister for Ecological Transition Teresa Ribera at the 2018 UN Climate Change Conference in Katowice, Poland

In 2014, Sánchez ran to be PSOE Secretary-General under what has been described as a "centrist" and "social liberal" platform, before moving further left in his successful 2017 bid to return to the leadership, during which he stood for a "re-foundation of social democracy", to transition to a "post-capitalist society", ending "neoliberal capitalism". One key idea posed in his 2019 Manual de Resistencia book is "the indissoluble link between 'social democracy' and 'Europe'". Sánchez is also a strong opponent of prostitution and has advocated for its abolition.

Sánchez voiced support for the European Green Deal and the green transition. He advocates for a federal European Union. Sánchez supports replacement migration to combat the decline and ageing of Spain's population. Following the 2025 Iberian Peninsula blackout, Sanchez and his government have expressed their staunch opposition to nuclear energy, citing that much of the world's uranium comes from Russia and their focus on other sources of renewable energies. Sánchez has been a strong advocate for finalizing the long-negotiated EU–Mercosur Free Trade Agreement, which aims to establish one of the world's largest free trade areas.

== Personal life ==
Sánchez married Begoña Gómez in 2006 and has two daughters. The civil wedding was officiated by Trinidad Jiménez. Sánchez is an atheist. He is a keen practitioner of enduro and downhill mountain biking, as shown by videos he posted to his X and Instagram profiles.

Aside from Spanish, Sánchez speaks fluent English and French. He is the first Spanish prime minister to be fluent in English while in office. (Note: Former prime minister José María Aznar became fluent in English after leaving office.) Until the transition to democracy following the death of Francisco Franco in the mid-1970s, foreign languages were not widely taught in Spanish schools, and former prime ministers, as representatives of their generation, have been known for struggling with them as a result.

On 14 July 2026, Pedro Sánchez's brother David, was sentenced by the Provincial Court of Badajoz to nine years of disqualification from holding public office for administrative prevarication related to alleged irregularities in his 2017 appointment at the Provincial Council of Badajoz.

== Electoral history ==
Electoral history of Pedro Sánchez
Election	List	Constituency	List position	Result
2003 Madrid municipal election	PSOE	–	24th (out of 55)	Not elected (Note: He became city councillor in 2004 replacing Elena Arnedo.)
2007 Madrid municipal election	PSOE	–	15th (out of 57)	Elected
2008 Spanish general election	PSOE	Madrid	21st (out of 35)	Not elected (Note: He became MP in 2009, replacing Pedro Solbes.)
2011 Spanish general election	PSOE	Madrid	11th (out of 36)	Not elected (Note: He became MP in 2013, replacing Cristina Narbona.)
2015 Spanish general election	PSOE	Madrid	1st (out of 36)	Elected
2016 Spanish general election	PSOE	Madrid	1st (out of 36)	Elected
April 2019 Spanish general election	PSOE	Madrid	1st (out of 37)	Elected
November 2019 Spanish general election	PSOE	Madrid	1st (out of 37)	Elected
2023 Spanish general election	PSOE	Madrid	1st (out of 37)	Elected

== Distinctions ==
- Bolivia:
  - Grand Collar of the Order of the Condor of the Andes (29 August 2018).
- Chile:
  - Medal of Salvador Allende (28 August 2018).
- Colombia:
  - Grand Cross of the Order of Boyaca (5 May 2023).
- France:
  - Grand Officer of the Legion of Honour (29 September 2026).
- Germany :
  - Grand Cross 1st Class of the Order of Merit of the Federal Republic of Germany (25 November 2025).
- Italy:
  - Knight Grand Cross of the Order of Merit of the Italian Republic (16 November 2021).
- Peru:
  - Grand Cross of the Order of the Sun of Peru (27 February 2019).
- Spain:
  - Grand Cross of the Order of Charles III (2 June 2018).
- Ukraine:
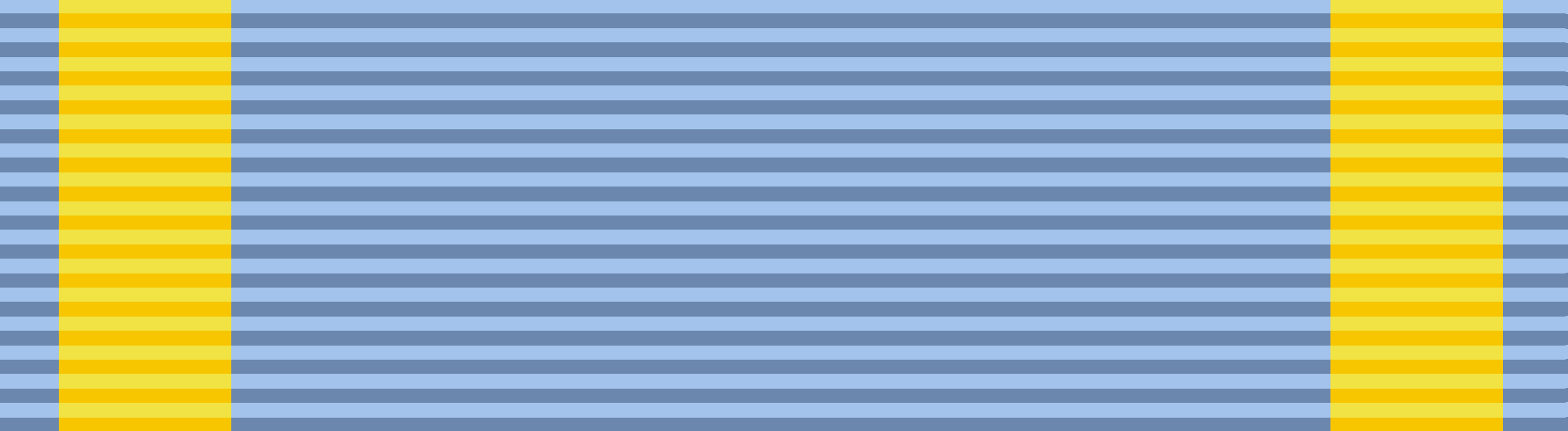
  - First Class of the Order of Prince Yaroslav the Wise (28 December 2023).

== Published works ==
- Ocaña Orbis, Carlos y Sánchez Pérez-Castejón, Pedro (2013): La nueva diplomacia económica española. Madrid: Delta. ISBN 9788415581512.
- Sánchez Pérez-Castejón, Pedro (2019): Manual de resistencia. Madrid: Península. ISBN 9788499427959.

=== Controversial authorship ===
- In 2018 a newspaper revealed that his book La nueva diplomacia económica española includes the plagiarism of six other people's texts. The suspicion was extended to his doctoral thesis, whose authorship was questioned.
- Regarding Manual de resistencia, Sánchez is given as the author, but the falsity of this claim is evidenced from the words of Sánchez himself, who states in the prologue that "This book is the result of long hours of conversation with Irene Lozano, writer, thinker, politician and friend. She gave a literary form to the recordings, giving me a decisive help". The mentioned writer, for her part, affirmed that "I made the book, but the author is the prime minister".

== See also ==
- List of current heads of state and government
- List of heads of the executive by approval rating

== Notes ==
Political offices
Preceded by Alfredo Pérez Rubalcaba	Leader of the Opposition; 2014–2016	Vacant
Vacant	Leader of the Opposition; 2017–2018	Succeeded by Pablo Casado
Preceded by Mariano Rajoy	Prime Minister of Spain; 2018–present	Incumbent
Party political offices
Preceded by Alfredo Pérez Rubalcaba	Secretary-General of the Spanish Socialist Workers' Party; 2014–2016	Succeeded by Caretaker committee led by Javier Fernández
Preceded by Caretaker committee led by Javier Fernández	Secretary-General of the Spanish Socialist Workers' Party; 2017–present	Incumbent
Preceded by George Papandreou	President of the Socialist International; 2022–present	Incumbent
