= Labaro (disambiguation) =

Labaro is a suburb of Rome.

Labaro may also refer to:

- Cantabrian labarum or Lábaru, a modern interpretation of the ancient military standard (flag)
- Lábaro, a Druid character in the 1980 film The Cantabrians
- El Lábaro, periodical published by Dolores Gortázar Serantes (1872–1936)

== See also ==
- Lauburu, or Basque cross
- Laparotomy, or Labarotomy
