= Dolores Gortázar Serantes =

Spanish writer, journalist, education activist

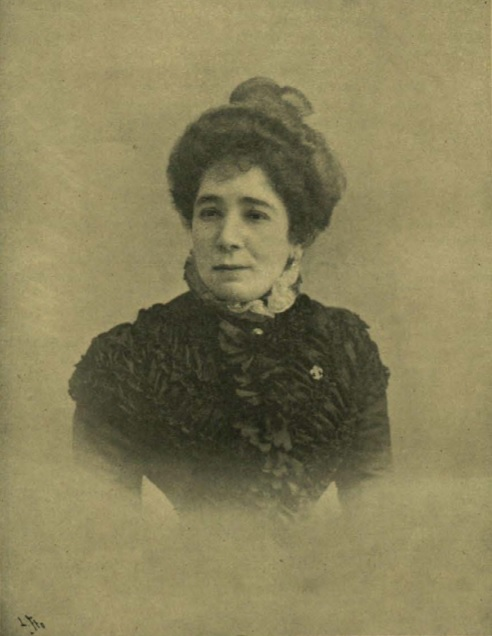
- Born: María de los Dolores Rosa Ramona de Gortázar y García Serantes; September 30, 1868; Coria, Spain
- Died: April 9, 1936 (67 years); Leganés, Spain
- Occupations: Writer; teacher; press correspondent
- Known for: writer
- Political party: Carlism

María Dolores de Gortázar Serantes (1868-1936) was a Spanish writer, journalist, education activist, feminist militant and political propagandist. In the 1910-1920s she enjoyed some popularity as a novelist; currently her literary contribution is considered of very little value. Over decades she contributed to some 40 periodicals and launched a short-lived feminine review on her own. Briefly engaged in setting up schools for the middle- and low-class girls, later she remained active advocating the presence of females in public life, especially in culture and education. Politically she sided with the Carlists, for decades contributing to their periodicals. All her activities were flavored with zealous Catholicism.

== Family and youth ==
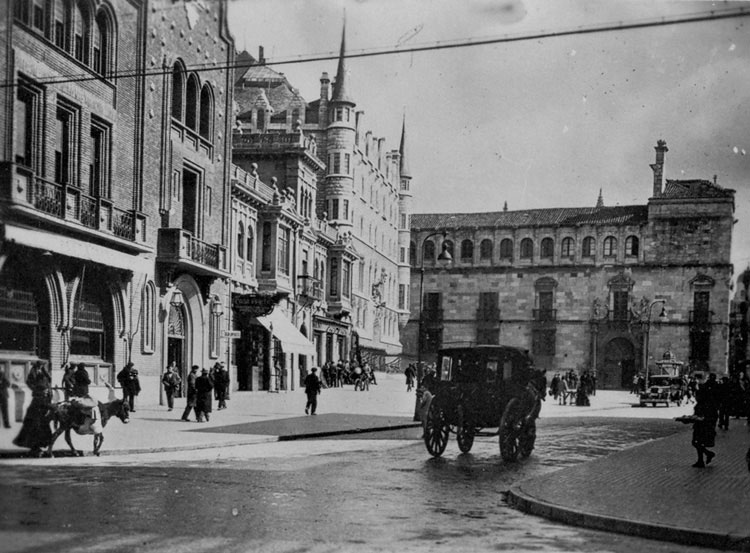
León, early 20th c.

The Gortázar family is one of the oldest ones in Spain, its first representatives noted in the 12th century as related to Vizcaya. Over centuries the Gortázars held various civil and religious posts in Biscay, Alava and Cantabria; the family became very branched and scattered across the North of Spain, some branches renamed to Cortázar. It is not clear which branch the Dolores ascendants belonged to, apart that they were linked to Santander and Biscay. Her father, Carlos Gortázar y Campillo (b.Torrelavega), was member of the urban middle-class. He joined the press corps, working as reporter and journalist; in the late 1850s and early 1860s he contributed from La Habana, later settling in León, and he married a local girl, Juliana García Serantes y de Cadórniga (1837-1916), descendant to a Leonese family distinguished especially along her maternal line.

The couple settled in León; it is not clear how many children they had, though it is likely that Dolores was the only one. She frequented the Carmelitan college in León, where she grew up and from childhood demonstrated a talent for letters. Her 1882 poem, dedicated to Jesus, was published in local press; her 1884 comedy was played at the Carmelitan theatre in León; her religious polemics was also acknowledged in print. In 1888 she got married; none of the sources consulted offers any information on motives for such an early decision. The groom was Fernando Valcárcel Saavedra Fajardo Ladrón de Guevara (1858–1893), descendant to a noble Levantine family; the couple settled in Mula. Valcárcel was soon diagnosed with mental disorder and in 1892 he was placed in a psychiatric hospital, where he died in 1895. Dolores’ only child, Carolina, was born either posthumously or shortly before Valcárcel's death.

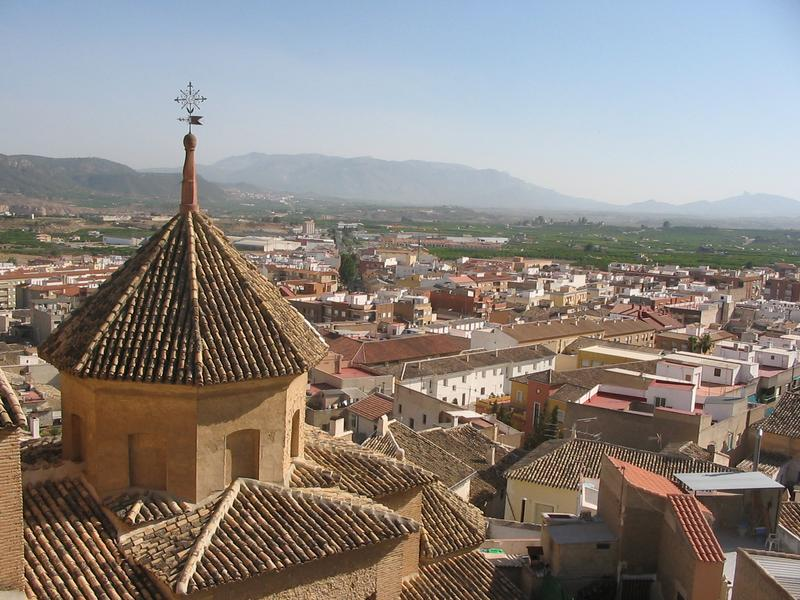
Mula, present-day view

Dolores returned to León; with her father already defunct, she joined her mother in the native city; she resumed education, training to be a teacher. In 1899 she completed the curriculum in León, becoming Maestra Superior; in 1903 she reportedly became Maestra Normal in Burgos, though her title was later questioned. She referred to herself as "doctora in filosofia y letras", yet it is not known whether, when and where she graduated. In 1910 Dolores remarried with a Madrid lawyer and Catholic writer Francisco Pol. The groom either died shortly or the couple separated, as the last information on the couple comes from 1915; Dolores’ personal life is vaguely described as "larga serie de calamidades". The last of these calamities was the premature 1936 death of Carolina; Dolores died two months after her daughter. At that point she had 5 grandchildren, born since 1918; none of them grew to prominence. The best known, Anselmo Salamero Valcárcel, was a Catholic missionary who held various managerial teaching positions, also in Latin America. Another one, José Salamero Valcárcel, worked for the Madrid monarchist daily ABC.

== Writer ==
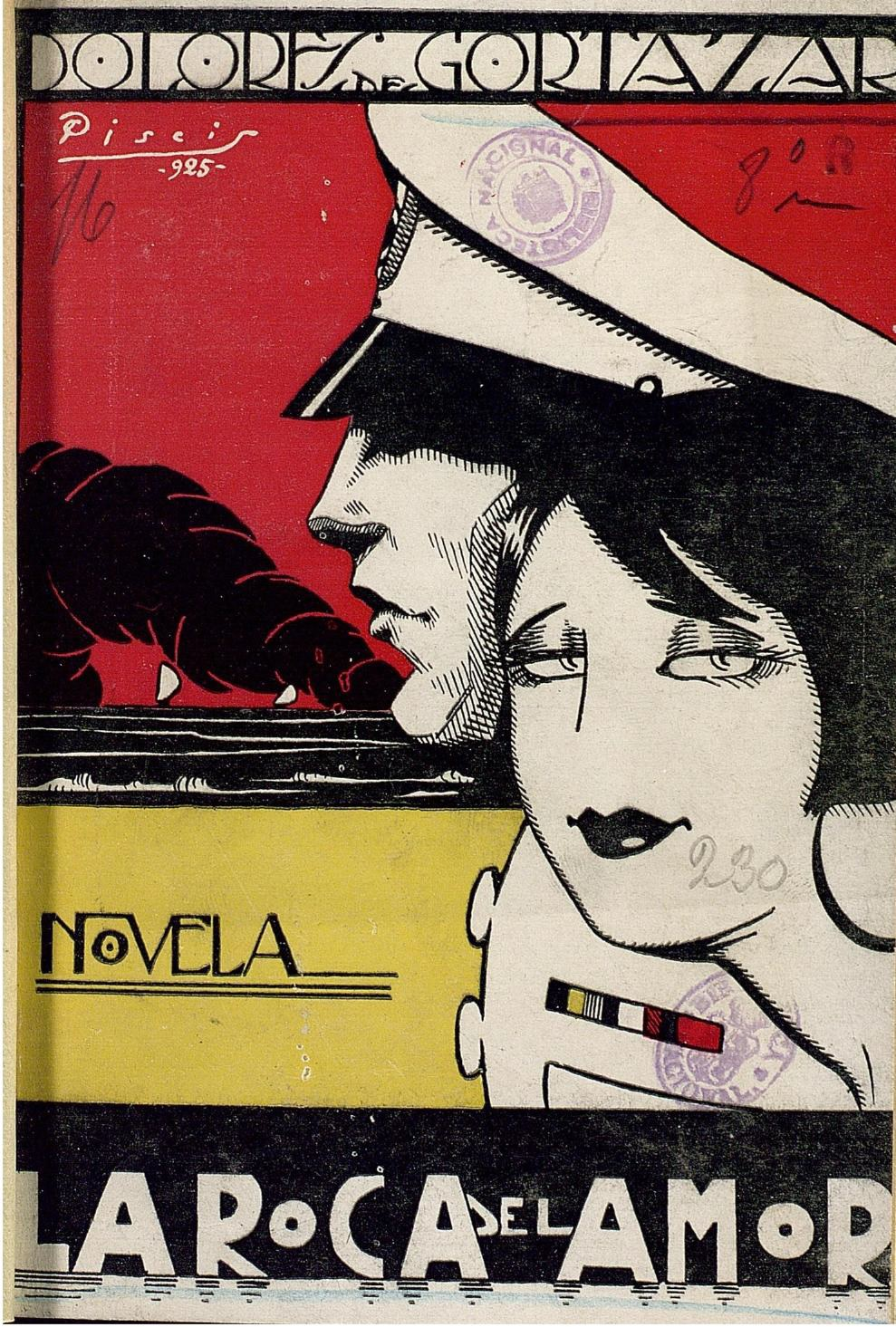
La roca del amor

Gortázar wrote poetic pieces throughout all of her life. They are scattered across various periodicals from the 1890s to the 1930s, sometimes featured on front pages; the only major volume she published was Nimias (1898). Her poetry keeps revolving around Christian virtues, advantages of family life, beauty of Spain and patriotic values; fairly conventional if not banal in terms of style, in terms of content it advances the praise of traditional orthodoxy, even if at times flavored with some melancholy. One more literary genre she followed was drama; she is known to have written two one-act comedies featuring "tipos y costumbres leonesas", played in León and perhaps also in Madrid.

In terms of public and scholarly recognition Gortázar was first noticed as a translator; her Spanish El arte poética (1901) version of Horace's Ars poëtica won awards at the León Juegos Florales and was acknowledged with praise by Real Academia Española. She tried her hand in historiography, especially in paleography; entrusted with specific tasks by Real Academia de la Historia, she published two studies on San Miguel de Escalada (1899) and the Valvanera monastery (1907). Other historiographic works were a mid-size biographical study on St. Frances of Rome (1911) and a piece on Incarnation (1902).

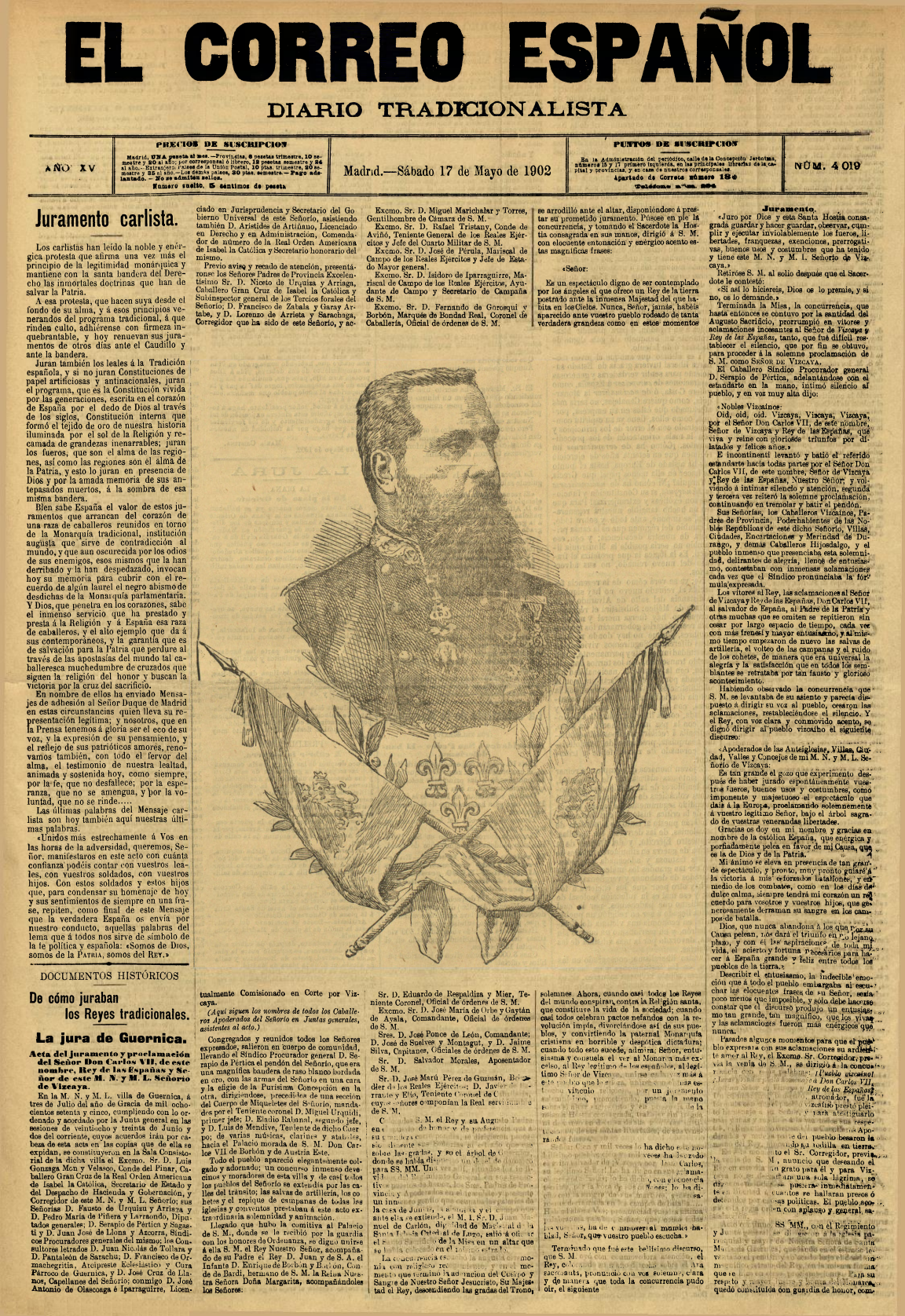
El Correo Español

In literature Gortázar obtained her biggest success as a novelist, the author of El Cristo de la roca (1911) and La roca del amor (1924). Both are in fact one and the same novel, the latter slightly re-edited to provide a sense of novelty; the disguise proved successful, as in contemporary press La roca was acknowledged as original. The novel is a love story, vaguely set in a milieu of Valencian aristocracy; it features a complex family intrigue. The plot is about overcoming a series of mysterious tragedies and misfortunes; Christian backbone of the protagonists, one of them a Catholic priest, enabled them to succeed. Falling into the typical genre fiction of the era, El Cristo / La roca is perhaps most interesting due to its narrative technique, as the story is made of different recollective accounts. Other Gortázar's prosaic attempts, a shorter novel and a collection of stories, were far less successful.

For some 40 years Gortázar contributed to numerous press titles; according to one source she published in some 35 periodicals in Spain and in America. Only some of them can be identified; the ones to be named due to her longtime collaboration are local dailies El Porvenir (León) and El Diario de Zamora, Carlist periodicals El Correo Español and El Cruzado Español, and women's reviews like Gloria Femenina. The title which stands out is Roma, her own initiative formatted as one of the first Spanish feminine reviews and issued in 1912-1914. Gortázar's contributions are mostly poems, travel correspondence. short stories, pieces on literature, arts, culture and education, all invariably formatted along Catholic lines and generally steering clear of controversial topics. As she usually published under various pen-names the scale of her production is yet to be assessed, though it was probably massive.

== Education, Catholic and feminist activist ==
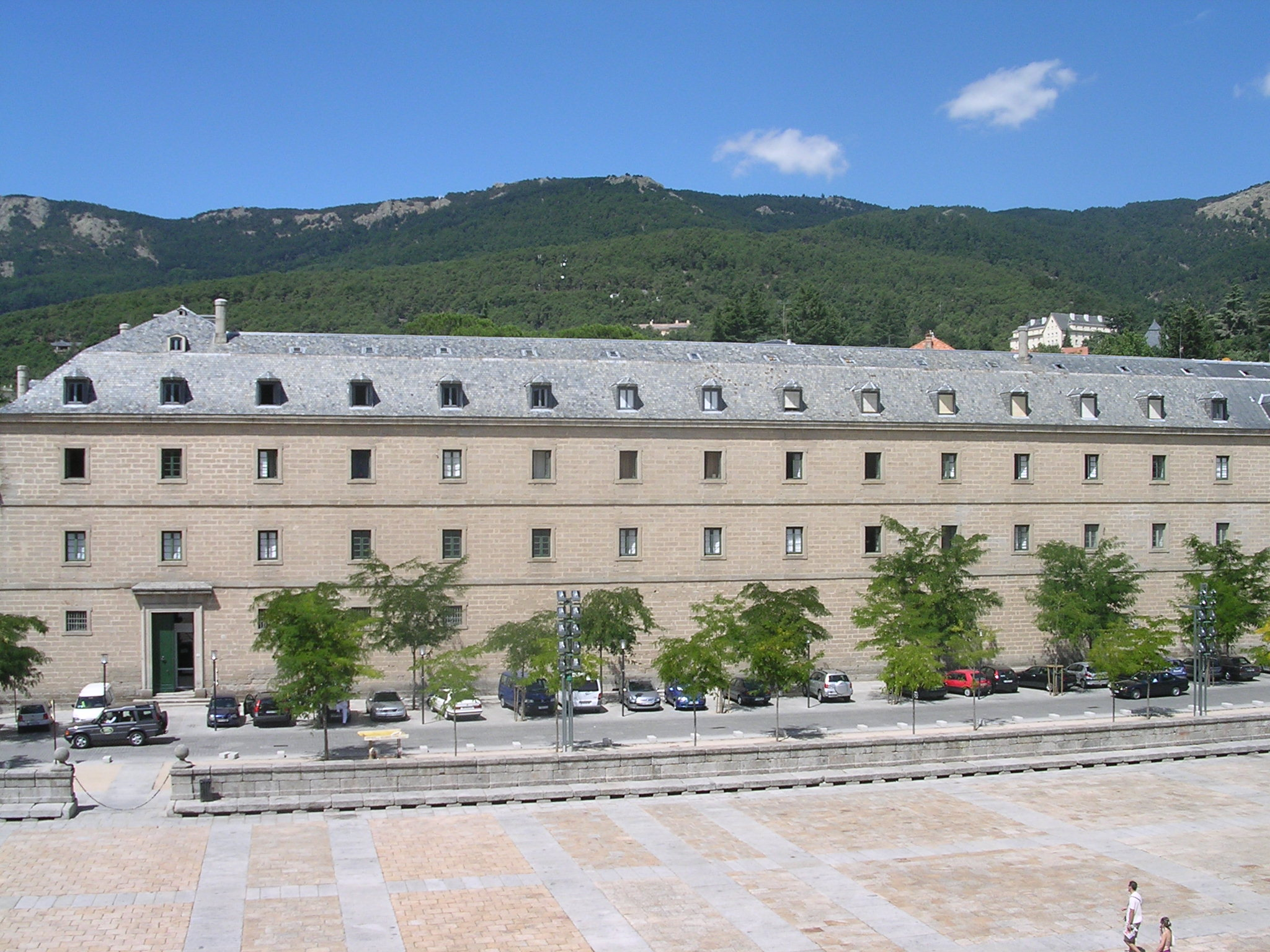
Colegio Maria Cristina, Escorial

In course of the usual opposiciones contest, in 1902 Gortázar emerged successful and commenced teaching in an unidentified Madrid state college. The same year she floated an idea of setting up a school for poor and handicapped children in Madrid, the concept which in 1904 was somewhat re-formatted to a high-quality state school for girls from middle class, daughters of "viudas, empleados, familias de militares y á veces la nobleza hundida". Already at that time the queen-mother Maria Christina was envisioned as a noble patron of the enterprise. In 1905 the project took shape of Centro Nacional de Instrucción de María Cristina, with Gortázar as its directora; she supervised preparation works, which in 1906 led to opening of Escuela María Cristina, in some sources referred to as Real Colegio de María Cristina. The establishment, apparently financed by private sponsors, was hailed in the press as state-of-the-art school; initially it admitted only 19 girls. Its curriculum was fairly standard, though it was allegedly the first one to include cooking lessons.

Though in 1907 Gortázar was still the headmaster, in 1908 and in unclear circumstances she left the establishment and returned to León. The same year she was appointed profesora provisional of Escuela Normal de Maestras in her native city, entering also the jury of Universidad de Oviedo, a body supervising the college opposiciones. In 1909 she was nominated profesora provisional in Escuela Normal de Maestras in Soria, yet her career was rather short. In 1910 she was charged with abuse of power and sacked. The issue is not entirely clear; in private letters Gortázar claimed her problems resulted from the ministry changing formal requirements. The episode seems to have terminated Gortázar's teaching career, though she was later reported as engaged in opening schools for the working class in Covadonga in 1914 and in Madrid in 1918.

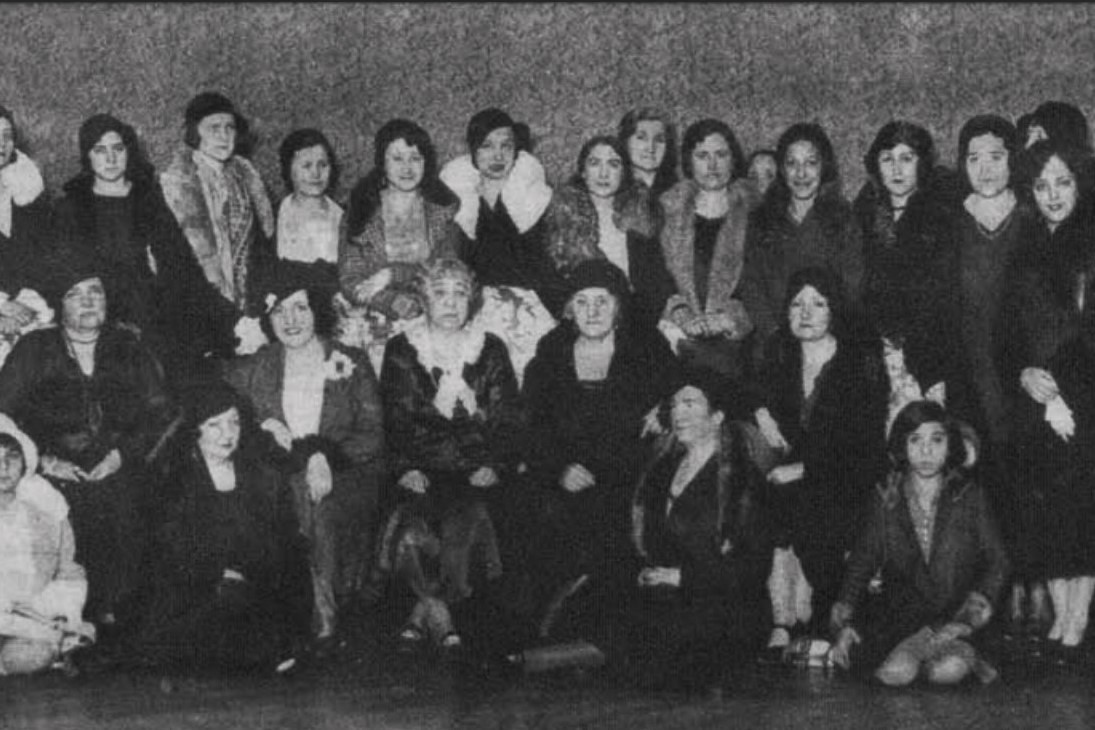
in Centro Feminista pro Paz Social, Madrid 1932

Since the 1910s Gortázar was engaged in countless organizations marked by their feminine, Catholic, educational and at times social character. In 1910 she was co-founder of Fundación San Francisco de Paula, in the mid-1910s headed Acción Social Católica Feminista, known also as Acción Social Católica de la Mujer Española, in the late 1910s acted in La Mujer Católica, since the early 1920s campaigned for hygiene and sanity, in 1927 co-launched Cruzada de Buenas Lecturas and as its president remained active in the organization until the early 1930s, in 1931 co-founded Club Feminista and was president of Sociedad Femenina Aspiraciones, while in 1932 she became president of Agrupación Femenina Paz Social. On top of this she contributed to feminine press, kept giving lectures on cultural topics, took part in various veladas culturales and was member of Asociación de Escritores y Artistas. Over time her engagements assumed somewhat non-traditional tone; in 1931-1933 she campaigned for female suffrage.

== Carlist ==
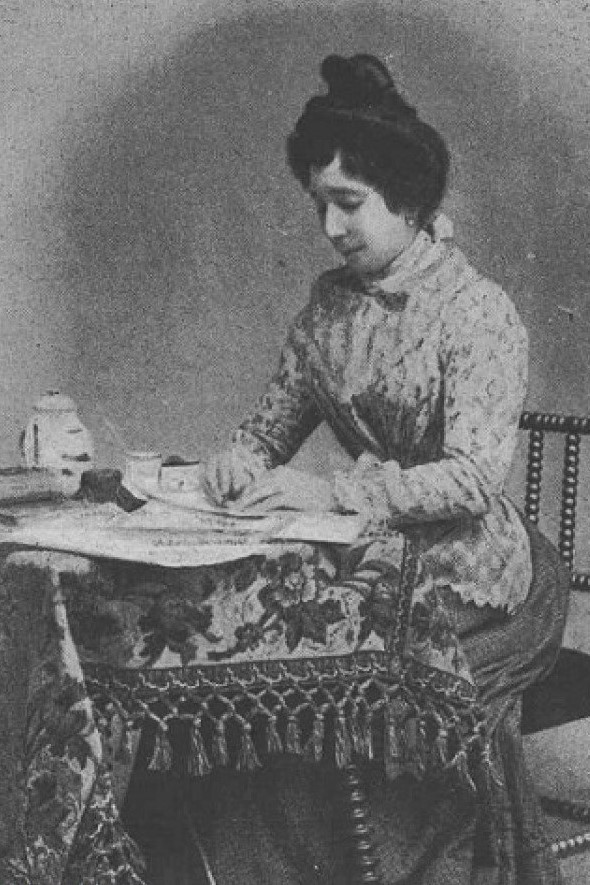
around 1915

Since Gortázar's father was a republican Liberal, it is not clear how the young Dolores developed Traditionalist sympathies; in the 1890s she was already a declared Carlist. Initially her activity was about organizing prayers and donations for the Spanish army fighting in Cuba, yet already in 1899 she engaged in veladas artisticas of the León círculo carlista. Successful proselytizing in private she took up propaganda works also in public, commencing cooperation with the semi-official Carlist mouthpiece, El Correo Español. In 1900 rumored even to launch her own Traditionalist daily, at that time she was already known as "ilustre dama carlista".

Her translation of Horace was acknowledged in a 1902 congratulation letter from the Carlist heir to the throne, Don Jaime. Since the prince has never demonstrated interest in letters, this expression of sympathy remains somewhat surprising. For the time being her Carlist zeal cooled down. During the Madrid schooling episode she seemed on perfect terms with the Alfonsist royal family and in the 1910s she published in Maurista and national-Catholic press. However, Gortázar retained her Carlist link, together with the party pundits sporadically giving lectures at Traditionalism-flavored events.

The climax of her Carlist activity fell on the years following the Mellista secession. In a huge 1919 front-page El Correo Español article she hailed Cid-style loyalty to the king as a genuine virtue; in 1920 she was listed active on numerous Jaimista meetings; in 1921 she became president of the Madrid Margaritas, the Carlist feminine organization. The same year she took part in Junta de Lourdes, a grand Carlist assembly supposed to set a new political direction; immediately afterwards she published La Regeneración de España, a pamphlet assailing Mellismo and applauding the Lourdes program. During some of the 1922 meetings she was seated next to the Jaimista leader, marqués de Villores.

Carlist standard

Collapse of El Correo Español deprived Gortázar of her key press tribune. She switched to other conservative periodicals, proudly boasting her friendship with Don Jaime, hailing him as "nuestro caudillo" and at times taking part in Traditionalism-flavored events. In the late 1920s she commenced close collaboration with a new Carlist weekly from Madrid, El Cruzado Español, hoping to convert it into a daily. At that time she was also awarded Ordén de la Legitimidad Proscrita, a high Carlist honor. During late primoderiverismo and Dictablanda she resumed more active stand, opening círculos, featuring in headlines and presiding over the Madrid Margaritas, mobilizing against "grandes privilegios a las mujeres rojas", especially after declaration of the Republic. In course of its first years she remained active in the Carlist realm, though rather in the second if not the third row: Gortázar contributed to Cruzado, presided over some meetings, opened new círculos, and gave lectures. Since 1933 she was honorary president of the Madrid círculo; in 1935 she contributed to electoral mobilization. However, when adhering to the cruzadista line she remained at the sidelines of Carlist loyalty and her contributions were rejected by chief editor of the official party mouthpiece, El Siglo Futuro, Manuel Senante.

== Reception and legacy ==
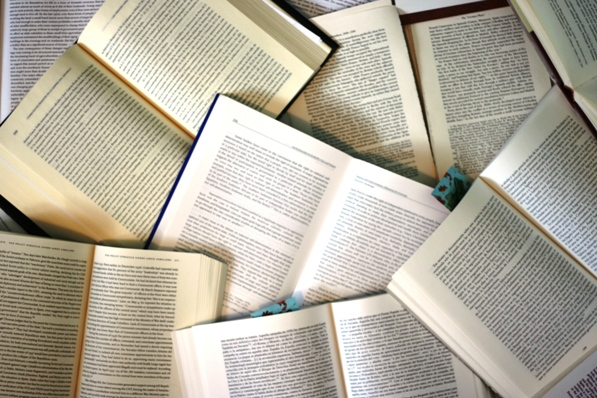

In 1901, Gortázar won her first awards with Ars Poetica appreciated at the León Juegos Florales and by the Academy; in public discourse the work earned her the prestige of "distinguida latinista". Her dramas were recognized only locally in León; her poetry went largely unnoticed, though in one case it was acknowledged as "escritas con soltura y buen gusto". Her only literary work which gained nationwide recognition and became sort of a bestseller was El Cristo de la Roca, published in 3 editions and followed by the next 2 under the title of El roca del amor. In contemporary press she was referred to as "insigne literata", "distinguida escritora" "conocida escritora", "insigne escritora", "laureada escritora", "unas de las más galanas plumas de nuestra floreciente literatura", "dama de gran cultura", "novelista de empuje y de maestría", "gran novelista", "eminente poetisa", "insigne poetisa" and "inspirada poetisa". Most of the above seem marketing slogans rather than opinion of informed critics, though Gortázar is known to have exchanged a friendly correspondence with Marcelino Menendez Pelayo and to have collaborated with Concepción Gimeno de Flaquer.

In more detailed reviews, her novels were appreciated for educational and human values, adhering to "profoundly Catholic" moral standards, much needed in time of false idols and "libros insulsos o criminales". In terms of literary value, they were noted for suggestive, graceful, elegant, natural style, flesh-and-blood personalities, social observations and in-depth psychological background, but especially for lively narration and interesting plot, allegedly corresponding to "historial de su autora"; all that rendered the work "highly recommended". The anti-clerical El Pais also recommended the novel, having found in it a criticism of conventual education, which ensures luxury of religious establishment and pushes the secular one into poverty. One newspaper claimed that a US company intended to buy a copyright and produce a movie.

In history of literature, Gortázar was initially treated very briefly, acknowledged by Cejador y Frauca in the 1920s; in 1925 she also featured in Enciclopedia Universal Ilustrada Europeo-Americana. Afterwards she fell into oblivion, barely mentioned in single works covering specific topics, not necessarily related to literature. None of the present-day numerous encyclopedias, dictionaries or synthetic works on Spanish literature mentions her name; even volumes dedicated to modern Spanish feminine poetry or to popular Spanish novel do not consider her worth noting. She earned biographical entries in two studies, perhaps due to her sex rather than because of the quality of her writings, and was twice dedicated articles in the Leonese press, named "principal escritora leonesa de su tiempo". In scholarly realm, she is noted in historiography rather than literature, as her paleographic studies are at times quoted in nowadays works. The school she co-founded and directed in 1906-1908 is active until today as Real Centro Universitario María Cristina, though the institution does not mention her on its web page. In the Carlist realm she is almost forgotten.

== See also ==
- Carlism
- Real Centro Universitario Escorial-Maria Christina
- El Cruzado Español
