= Manos Limpias =

Trade union in Spain

Manos Limpias (English: Clean Hands) is an association founded in Madrid in 1995 by Spanish lawyer and extreme right activist Miguel Bernad Remón. While claiming to represent employees in Spanish public services Manos Limpias stated aim is "to file all types of complaints regarding political or economic corruption that harms the public or general interest" Considered by The New York Times, The Guardian, and several Spanish media to be politically motivated by the far-right, it has been labelled a pseudo-trade union. The group takes its name from the Mani Pulite judicial investigation into political corruption in Italy held in the early 1990s and led by Antonio Di Pietro.

Miguel Bernad entered politics as a protege of Blas Piñar during his tenure as the Fuerza Nueva and National Front party secretary. Miguel Bernad is a Knight of Honor of the Francisco Franco National Foundation.

== Notability ==
Manos Limpias played a role in the indictment of Baltasar Garzón, a judge who investigated crimes against humanity committed by the Franco regime, and attacked a children's TV show for alleged gay overtones and for prosecuting Spanish Princess Cristina for tax fraud.

== Structure ==
At present, the union states that it has over 6,000 members, who contribute an annual fee of 60 euros. It is currently under investigation for extortion from banks and the Spanish royal family. Miguel Bernad is the only member of Manos Limpias who is publicly known. On 26 April 2016 he indicated that he wanted to dissolve the union. According to The New York Times, the union has no institutional representation as of 2009.

== Social and political objectives ==
As of 2012, Manos Limpias' self-proclaimed goal is to defend the constitutional Rule of law against corruption and separatist nationalism. Manos Limpias declares itself independent from any party, and claims to have no ideological affiliation; however, the vast majority of the lawsuits brought by them to court were consistently against the socioliberal centre-right or against the nationalist in Catalonia and Basque Country. Other cases include cases against the right wing Partido Popular or the King’s sister. The group has often been described by the media as a far-right civil servants' organisation due to their choice of court actions and Mr. Bernad's past membership of the far right party Fuerza Nueva during the early eighties.

== Propensity for legal action ==
Manos Limpias uses private prosecution (Spanish: Acusación particular) to bring criminal complaints against third parties, a unique feature of Spanish legal system that allows a citizen or organisation to participate in prosecuting crimes in the public interest, even if they were not personally harmed. The aim of this mechanism is to reinforce citizen oversight of public justice, though it has also been criticised for possibly distorting criminal justice.

The Court of Barcelona has argued that "it seems that the activity of this trade union is no other than to file complaints" and reminded that "it is also the duty of the courts to guarantee the right of defense and the speed of process".

The court expressed concern that the activity of Manos Limpias can cause "accusatory hypertrophy", "which can end up affecting the right to a defense and make the legal process even slower, and create a multiplicity of accusations which, insofar as Manos Limpias are not harmed by the offense, cannot have an interest in the criminal proceedings different from that of the Prosecutor".

=== Private prosecution as a legal tool ===
The Provincial Court of Barcelona, in its order of 23 March 2015, confirming a previous statement, reminded Manos Limpias that the law gives the right to private prosecution to private entities, not to public entities. "The popular action can only be vetoed by entities of public nature".

The resolution concludes that Manos Limpias is an organization "quasi-public, although its constitution has a private basis", adding: "Its significance and its legal nature is public". And that "we are faced with two unequivocal conclusions: Manos Limpias is a trade union and, moreover, its activity focuses on the field of the public administration."

"Trade Unions have constitutional recognition, they receive public assistance or subsidies and dedicate themselves to participate in collective bargaining processes. Therefore, their nature can never be private".

Since the activity of the union focuses on the field of administration, Manos Limpias has no legitimacy to supplant the role attributed by the law to prosecutions that holds the adversarial principle in defense of the general good.

Manos Limpias held no accounts or assemblies of members as required by their statutes.

== Investigations into Manos Limpias ==
=== Misappropriation and money laundering ===
In 2015, the Madrid Prosecution of Economic Crimes (Spain) investigated the president of Manos Limpias, Miguel Bernad, and attorney of the trade union Virginia Lopez Negrete for alleged misappropriation of funds and money laundering. The prosecution believed that Miguel Bernad and attorney Virginia Lopez may have extorted money for the union by exploiting the funds relating to the prosecution of the scams of Forum and Afinsa. the Court admitted the complaint against both.

The Spanish Commission for the Prevention of Money Laundering and Monetary Offences (SEPBLAC) conducted a comprehensive financial intelligence report and found evidence of criminal activity. For this reason, Sepblac sent a complaint to the Economic Crimes Section of the Provincial Prosecutor of Madrid, where they opened investigative proceedings. The financial research report on the accounts of Virginia Lopez Negrete threw up surprises.

=== Investigated by the Supreme Court ===
In February 2015, the Criminal Division of the Spanish Supreme Court opened an investigation into Manos Limpias considering an abuse of process In its resolution it said that "it is not permissible that the procedural part discontented with the judgment answer, nor with the interposition of a resource, but with the presentation of the complaint orphan foundation." The court added that "if these reactions would be dynamited it became widespread climate of security and peace that should surround a Court to decide."

=== Investigations for fraud and extortion ===
Since late 2014, the Spanish Economic Crime Unit and tax evasion detection service (UDEF) of the National Police has been carrying an investigation against Manos Limpias and Ausbanc, A legal support service for bank clients. Manos Limpias and Ausbanc coordinated, for years, to lodge felony complaints against all types of enterprises and institutions and then to demand large sums of money in exchange for the complaint withdrawal. The investigations are led by the Spanish National Court and is focus primarily against the president of Ausbanc, Miguel Bernad and Virginia López Negrete.

There have been reports of workers and several victims of the alleged plot. One of them is one of the people who sat on the bench 'case Nóos'. Another of the facts investigated is the sudden withdrawal of a complaint filed against any of the parts "because they had already claimed extortion".

For some years, Ausbanc intimidated others with open court cases, for which he teamed up with Manos Limpias. The Ausbanc President, Luis Pineda, and the Secretary General of Manos Limpias, Miguel Bernad, maintained a friendship for years and have been linked to far-right settings. Luis Pineda and Miguel Bernad "come and have militated in far-right movements "and agreed" with Virginia López (Negrete, a spokesman for Manos Limpias) in Blesa case, when Luis Pineda worked as a lawyer on behalf of Manos Limpias".

== Legal actions ==
Manos Limpias achieved controversial notoriety in the international press after filing a lawsuit against the Spanish investigating judge Baltasar Garzón for his 2008 investigation of war crimes committed during and after the Spanish Civil War. Manos Limpias sought leave to prosecute Garzón for undertaking his investigation, and accused him of breaking the 1977 amnesty law, exceeding his powers as an investigating judge of the Audiencia Nacional. They also accused him of deliberately acting in an unjust and unfair manner based on the fact that in 1998 Garzón had dismissed a similar indictment against communist politician Santiago Carrillo, accused of crimes against humanity during the Spanish Civil War.

In May 2009 the Supreme Court accepted Manos Limpias' lawsuit against Garzón for his "blatant, deliberate, conscious and arrogant role" in "trespassing against the dead". In 2010, Garzón was suspended as a judge pending trial, however, on 27 February 2012 the Spanish Supreme Court found Garzón innocent on these charges. It is worth noting that the United Nations has requested that Spain repeal the 1977 law.

In an interview with the Spanish Catholic radio Station COPE at the time of the indictment, Miguel Bernad claimed that, by admitting the latest action against Garzón, the Supreme Court had given a boost to its mission of battling against the current "deterioration in the rule of law". There had been some twenty previous attempts from Manos Limpias to incriminate Garzón, for various alleged offences including negligence or delay in the seizure of taverns used by ETA militants, for contributing to the leading centre-left national newspaper El País, for contributing to an interview with former parliamentary president Felipe González, for participating in a rally against the war in Iraq and for leaking the medical report of Augusto Pinochet.

Manos Limpias was the sole accuser against Spanish Princess Cristina, via lawyer Virginia Lopez Negrete, who said all citizens were equal before the law. Princess Cristina remains sixth in line to the throne.

Manos Limpias has achieved the conviction on contempt of court charges of the president of the Basque parliament, Juan Maria Atutxa, for disobeying the Supreme Court's requirement to disband Sozialista Abertzaleak, the political wing of ETA.

Other Manos Limpias complaints target the promotion of gay marriage in a TV puppet show.

In April 2024 Manos Limpias filed a complaint against Prime Minister Pedro Sánchez's wife Begoña Gómez for influence trafficking and corruption. This led judge Juan Carlos Peinado to open an investigation and ultimately charge Gómez on multiple corruption offenses in April 2026.
