= Begoña Gómez =

Wife of Pedro Sánchez (born 1975)

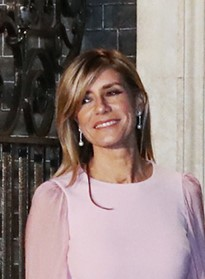
- Gómez in 2019
- Born: María Begoña Gómez Fernández; 24 March 1971 (age 55); Bilbao, Spain
- Spouse: Pedro Sánchez (m. 2006)
- Children: 2

María Begoña Gómez Fernández (born 24 March 1971) is the wife of Pedro Sánchez, the Prime Minister of Spain. Gómez was director of business outsourcing for the Inmark Group until her husband became Prime Minister of Spain in 2018. From 2018 to 2022, she was executive director of the Africa Center of the Institute of Enterprise. Since 2020, she has served as the Extraordinary Chair of Competitive Social Transformation of the Complutense University of Madrid. Since 2024, she has been the focus of an investigation regarding allegations of misappropriation of intellectual property, among other cases.

On 19 June 2026 her passport was seized by the court investigating the allegations. She will not be able to travel outside Europe until such judicial measures are lifted.

On 16 July 2026, the Madrid Provincial Court confirmed that Begoña Gómez would stand trial on charges of influence peddling and embezzlement.

== Early life and education ==
Gómez was born in Bilbao. Her father is Sabiniano Gómez Serrano, an entrepreneur in the erotic business, and she has one brother, Miguel Gómez Fernández. She spent most of her childhood in Valderas, in the province of León, where she moved not long after her birth. As a young woman, Gómez moved to Madrid to study. Although she indicated in her curriculum vitae that she obtained a bachelor's degree in marketing from ESIC University, a private business and marketing school, a journalistic investigation by Okdiario revealed, with documentary evidence and statements by fellow students and the school's director, that she actually followed a marketing programme at M&B School of Marketing and Business, a private entity, and that what she obtained was a diploma, not an officially recognized degree, so her level of studies is a Spanish Baccalaureate. Subsequently, she took two courses in tertiary education at a non-degree level: one in business management and another in business administration, business relations, and data management.

== Business career ==
Gómez began her career as an accountant in her father's sauna businesses, which catered to both male and female prostitution. She later worked at the Atenea Business Center, where she served as director from 1996 to 1999. In 2000, she started working for the Inmark Group; she worked there and was director of business outsourcing for 18 years until her husband became Prime Minister of Spain in 2018. She was also strategy consultant and team training for Spain and Portugal from 1999 to 2018, professor in the Master in Marketing and Commercial Management at EAE Business School from 2009 to 2010, and coordinating partner of the Business Social Transformation WAS working group since 2018.

Following her husband Pedro Sánchez's appointment as the Prime Minister of Spain in June 2018, Gómez obtained a University Chair in "Competitive Social Transformation" at Universidad Complutense de Madrid and became co-director of a new Master program in Competitive Social Transformation, and co-director of the fundraising title for the third sector (UCM and AEFR). She was also a partner of the Spanish Fundraising Association and executive director of the Africa Center of the Institute of Enterprise from 2018 to 2022. In 2020, she became the extraordinary Chair of Competitive Social Transformation of the Complutense University of Madrid, a position that she held until 2024 alongside her co-director role and teacher of the master's degree. (Note: The main scope of the Chair of Competitive Social Transformation of the Complutense University of Madrid is "to accompany companies in the planning and integration of a strategy of social and environmental impact into the business strategy, resulting in a more competitive and better organization on the planet". Gómez stated: "From this Chair, we invite you to think about models that allow us to reset capitalism as Milton Friedman understood it more than 50 years ago. Today, companies are increasingly aware of the need to connect with society because it makes them stronger, more competitive, and attractive to their stakeholders. The time has come to generate social impact linked to business, to measure it and maximize it.") She did not hold any political office and maintained a low profile.

== Investigation into influence trafficking and corruption, 2024 ==
On 24 April 2024, judge Juan Carlos Peinado opened an investigation into Gómez for alleged influence trafficking and corruption following a complaint by a number of anti-graft organisations, including Manos Limpias, or Clean Hands in English (referencing the 1990s Italian corruption investigative pool Mani pulite), an anti-corruption non-governmental organisation. Led by Miguel Bernad, formerly the secretary general of the far-right National Front, it considers itself a trade union but its main activity is acting as a platform pursuing politically-motivated legal cases; for example, they acted as a private prosecutor against Iñaki Urdangarín and his wife the daughter of the King of Spain, which led to the conviction of the former for corruption offences.

Gómez had signed several letters of recommendation for companies that ended up receiving state aid or contracts. The Central Operative Unit (UCO) of the Civil Guard found no evidence that she or Sanchez himself interceded in favour of these companies, but some considered her behaviour to be ethically doubtful; unlike countries such as the United Kingdom, Spain has no code of ethics defining activities of the relatives of public officials. At a rally held by the Spanish far-right party Vox in Madrid on 19 May 2024, the incumbent Argentinian president Javier Milei called Gómez corrupt, which caused a diplomatic crisis with Argentina, and the Spanish ambassador demanded apologies. The attack on his wife caused Sánchez to take a five-day recess and consider resignation, which he ultimately did not do, writing: "We are absolutely calm. There is nothing behind these accusations, only a cheap hoax created by far-right groups." The education minister and government spokesperson Pilar Alegría expressed surprise at the fact the news of the investigation came out ahead of the 2024 European Parliament election in Spain and stated: "We know that there is absolutely nothing here. What we have here is a mudslinging campaign by the right and the far right." Gómez was scheduled to testify before a Madrid court on 5 July 2024 as "an investigated party" about "the alleged offences of corruption in the private sector and influence peddling".

On 10 June 2024, the European Public Prosecutor's Office, which rejected Vox's private accusation because these are not allowed in this type of procedure, demanded that the court assume part of the investigation of the case for alleged corruption, alleging that European funds were involved. Complutense University sent the court a report in which it found indications that Gómez could have committed a crime of misappropriation by having appropriated software financed by the University itself, and by having issued contracts and expenses on behalf of the University without being authorised to do so. The report also indicated lack of cooperation on the part of the investigated.

On 15 July 2024, Juan Carlos Barrabés, a Spanish businessman linked to Gómez, testified as a witness. He claimed to have met up to eight times with her at the Moncloa Palace, and on at least two occasions with Pedro Sánchez present. Four days later, Gómez refused to testify before Peinado. The vice-rectors of Complutense University stated that they had warned Gómez that she could not put the software financed by the Complutense University in her name. Likewise, vice-rector Juan Carlos Doadrio declared that it was rector Joaquín Goyache who had ordered him to create the chair of Gómez. On 29 October 2024, the judge charged Gómez with alleged crimes of misappropriation and professional trespassing for supposedly having appropriated the software of the chair that was paid for by the Complutense University. In September 2025, Peinado summoned Gómez to appear in court for a jury trial. Following the two-year investigation, on 14 April 2026, it was reported that she is formally charged on several corruption offences, that include embezzlement, influence peddling, and misuse of public funds. A 20 June report, confirms that she will stand trail for the corruption charges against her and must hand in her passport, as she is banned from leaving the country.

== Personal life ==
Gómez married Sánchez in 2006, at the Hipódromo de la Zarzuela racecourse in Madrid, in a ceremony officiated by PSOE politician Trinidad Jiménez. They have two daughters, Carlota (born 2005) and Ainhoa (born 2007). Gómez and several government politicians were early positive cases in the COVID-19 pandemic in Spain after they had attended an International Women's Day march on 8 March 2020. That event was criticised for going ahead while the virus was spreading. On 2 May 2020, Sánchez confirmed Gómez's recovery.
