= Real Centro Universitario Escorial-Maria Christina =

Private university in Madrid, Spain

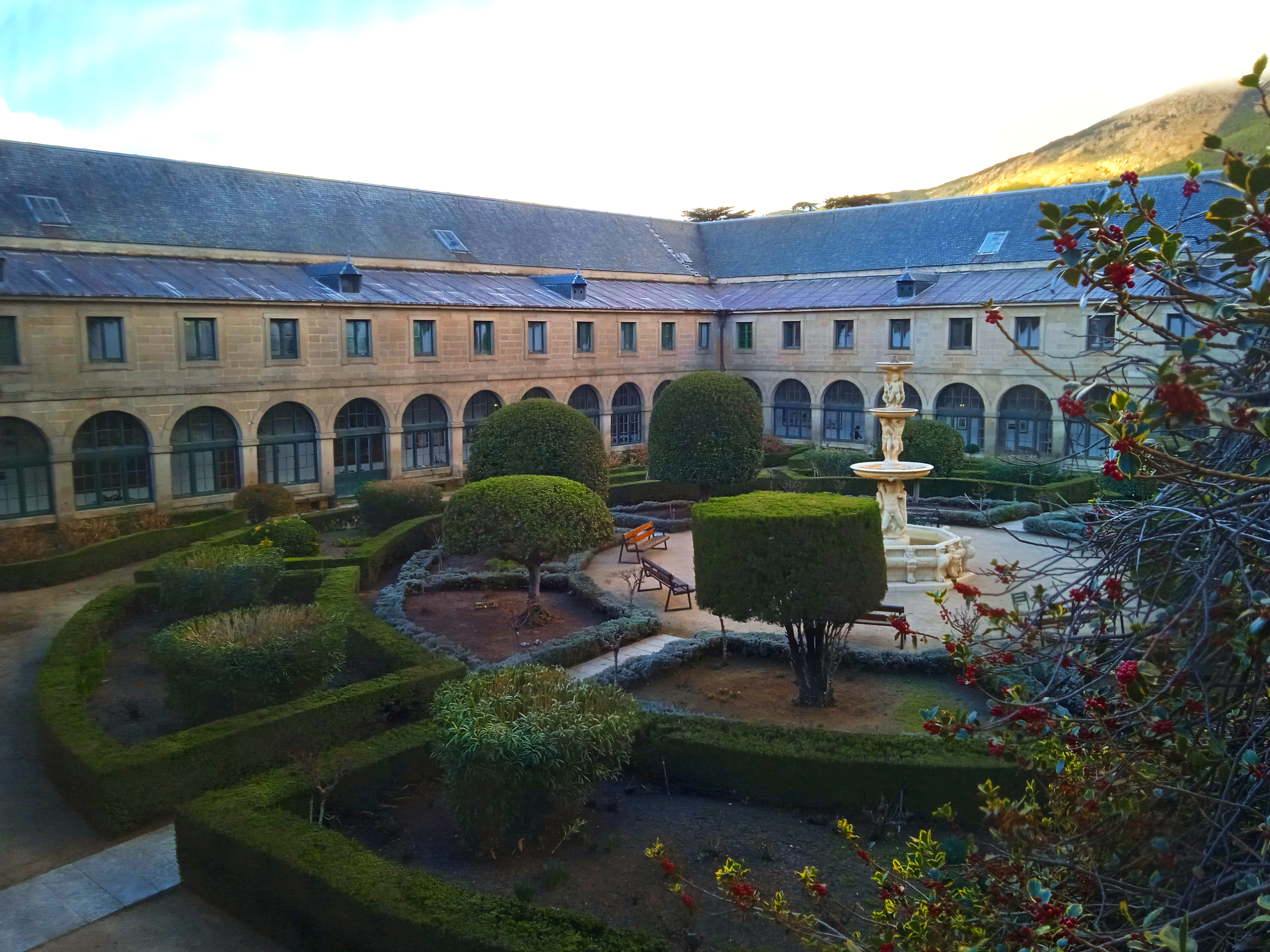
Real Centro Universitario María Cristina de El Escorial, Casa de la Compaña

The Real Centro Universitario Escorial-María Cristina (RCUEMC) is a private college in San Lorenzo de El Escorial, Spain, founded in 1892 by the Regent Maria Christina of Austria. The governance of the institution was given to the Order of Saint Augustine. The RCUEMC is part of the architectural monument complex of the Monastery of San Lorenzo de El Escorial. It has several academic programs: a private program in chiropractic, and two official degree programs in law and in business.

== Madrid College of Chiropractic ==
In 2007, the RCUEMC began offering chiropractic education through the establishment of the Madrid College of Chiropractic in its premises. The academic curriculum was created through a collaboration with the Anglo-European College of Chiropractic. It is a 5-year full-time program divided in 4 years leading to a Titulo Superior Universitario en Quiropráctica, followed by a one-year undergraduate master's degree (MChiro). In Spain, chiropractic is not regulated by law, therefore there is no regulation either for the profession or academic title. In 2012, the European Council On Chiropractic Education granted its full accreditation to the RCUEMC and its chiropractic program. This accreditation allows graduates to practice in countries and jurisdictions where the chiropractic profession is regulated and where the law requires graduation from an accredited institution.
