= 2015 PSOE prime ministerial primary =

- 26 July 2015 (Note: The primary election was left uncontested on 16 June, as a result of Pedro Sánchez's candidacy being the only one meeting the endorsement requirements.)
- Opinion polls
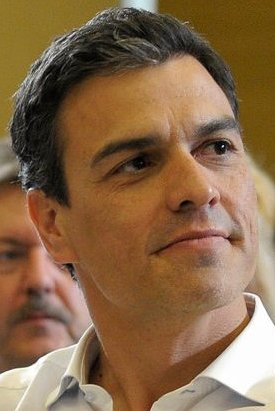
Candidate	Pedro Sánchez
Popular vote	Uncontested
Previous prime ministerial nominee
Alfredo Pérez Rubalcaba (2011)
Elected prime ministerial nominee
Pedro Sánchez

A primary election was scheduled for Sunday, 26 July 2015, to elect the prime ministerial nominee of the Spanish Socialist Workers' Party (PSOE) for the 2015 Spanish general election.

Plans for the primaries had been ongoing since the 2012 PSOE congress, which saw the adoption by the party of an open primary system to elect its candidates for prime minister. Initially scheduled for November 2014, the original proposal was scrapped following the party's defeat at the European Parliament election in May that year, which led to the resignation of PSOE leader Alfredo Pérez Rubalcaba and in an extraordinary congress to elect his successor. Pedro Sánchez emerged as the party's new secretary-general, after winning a closed primary—a novel system in PSOE's leadership elections—among party members. The prime ministerial primary was then rescheduled to July 2015, after the local and regional elections in May, with Sánchez launching his candidacy in September 2014.

Other potential contenders, such as Andalusian president Susana Díaz or former defence minister Carme Chacón, ruled out running for the post. Concurrently, Sánchez's position was reinforced following the PSOE's relative success in the 24 May 2015 elections, in which it regained much of the territorial power it had lost in 2011. As a result, Sánchez was the only candidate who met the endorsement requirements to contest the primaries, leading to him being elected unopposed as the party's prime ministerial candidate on 21 June 2015.

== Background ==
Previous experiences in the Spanish Socialist Workers' Party (PSOE) to elect its prime ministerial nominees through party primaries had seen a contested election in 1998—in which Josep Borrell, a former public works minister, successfully faced off then party leader Joaquín Almunia—and two uncontested ones in 2002 and 2011, the latter of which had seen deputy prime minister and interior minister of Spain Alfredo Pérez Rubalcaba becoming the PSOE's nominee for the 2011 Spanish general election; all of these had been, however, closed to party members. The 2012 PSOE federal party congress, in which Rubalcaba succeeded José Luis Rodríguez Zapatero as new secretary-general, had also introduced an open primary system to elect the party's prime ministerial candidate to the next general election, with any citizen over 16 years of age being allowed to register and vote.

Throughout 2012 and 2013, as Rubalcaba's popularity declined, sectors within the party demanded a date being set for the primary election, with the PSOE leadership claiming that it would be held a few months before the general election's scheduled date. In order to park the internal debate, the party announced in January 2014 that it would be holding its prime ministerial primary in November that year. Rubalcaba had reportedly not decided whether to run in the primary election himself, conditioning his final position on the PSOE's results in the 2014 European Parliament election, scheduled for 25 May.

The party's negative results in the European Parliament election forced Rubalcaba's retirement as PSOE leader and triggered an extraordinary party congress in July; it saw Pedro Sánchez, a deputy for Madrid, being elected as new secretary-general through a closed primary election among party members. All three main candidates in the leadership contest (Eduardo Madina, José Antonio Pérez Tapias and Sánchez himself) promised to keep the open primary system for selecting the party's nominee for prime minister, but it was rescheduled to July 2015 to postpone any further internal struggles until after the local and regional elections in May.

With Madina having ruled out contesting the primary following his defeat in the 2014 congress, the only other major potential contenders were former defence minister Carme Chacón—who had pushed for primaries ever since her aborted bid in the 2011 process—and Andalusian president Susana Díaz, but both declined to challenge Sánchez.

== Overview ==
=== Procedure ===
The PSOE Federal Committee approved on 18 January 2014 a party regulation for the election of candidates to public offices through an open primary system. This complemented existing regulations, which already established primaries as mandatory to elect prime ministerial nominees, except when the candidate already held the office of prime minister and was seeking re-election, in which case a primary election would only be held if explicitly requested by the federal committee as a body or by a majority of its members.

The primary election was organized on the basis of plurality voting. Voting comprised all members of the PSOE—including its regional branches—the Socialists' Party of Catalonia (PSC), the Socialist Youth of Spain (JSE) and the Socialist Youth of Catalonia (JSC), as well as all nationals over 16 years of age who had registered to participate in the process; such register required of the previous signing of a commitment and/or declaration of progressive principles and values as well as the payment of a minimum symbolic contribution of two euros. Candidates seeking to run were required to collect the endorsements of at least 5% of party members (which for the 2015 prime ministerial primary amounted to 9,700 endorsements). In the event of only one candidate meeting this requirement, the primaries would be left uncontested with such candidate being elected unopposed.

=== Timetable ===
The key dates of the primary election procedure are listed below (all times are CET):

- 30 May: Official announcement of the primary election.
- 1 June: Start of pre-candidacy submission period.
- 5 June: Start of endorsement collection period.
- 16 June: End of endorsement collection and pre-candidacy submission periods at 12 pm.
- 16 June: Endorsement verification and provisional proclamation of primary candidates.
- 21 June: Definitive proclamation of primary candidates and start of citizen registration period.
- 10 July: End of citizen registration period.
- 11 July: Official start of internal information campaign.
- 25 July: Last day of internal information campaign.
- 26 July: Primary election (polling stations open at 10 am and close at 8 pm).
- 27 July: Provisional proclamation of results.
- 31 July: Definitive proclamation of results.

== Candidates ==
Candidate	Notable positions	Announced	Ref.
=== Qualified ===
Candidates who met endorsement requirements and qualified to contest the primary election.
Pedro Sánchez (age 43)	Secretary-General of the PSOE (since 2014); Leader of the Opposition of Spain (since 2014); Member of the Congress of Deputies for Madrid (2009–2011 and since 2013); City Councillor of Madrid (2004–2009)	13 September 2014	
=== Failed to qualify ===
Candidates who announced an intention to run, but failed to qualify due to not meeting endorsement requirements.
Sergio Cebolla (age 37)	Secretary of Group Dynamization of the PSOE–A in the province of Seville (since 2013)	5 June 2015	
Pedro Antonio Ibáñez (age 43)	None	8 June 2015	
Manuel Pérez (age 67)	None	13 June 2015	
Manuel Castro (age unknown)	None	16 June 2015	

=== Declined ===
The individuals in this section were the subject of speculation about their possible candidacy, but publicly denied or recanted interest in running:

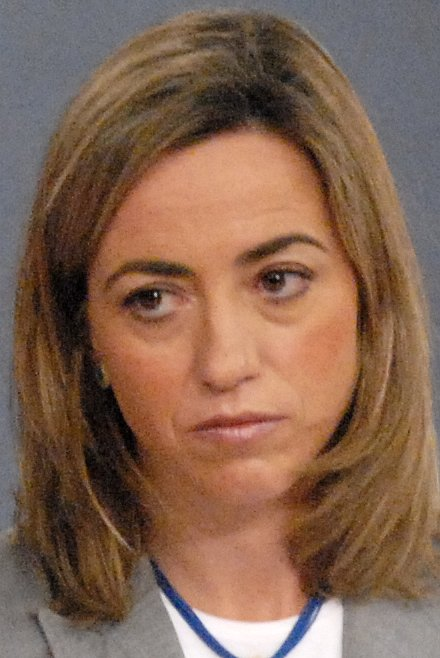
Carme Chacón

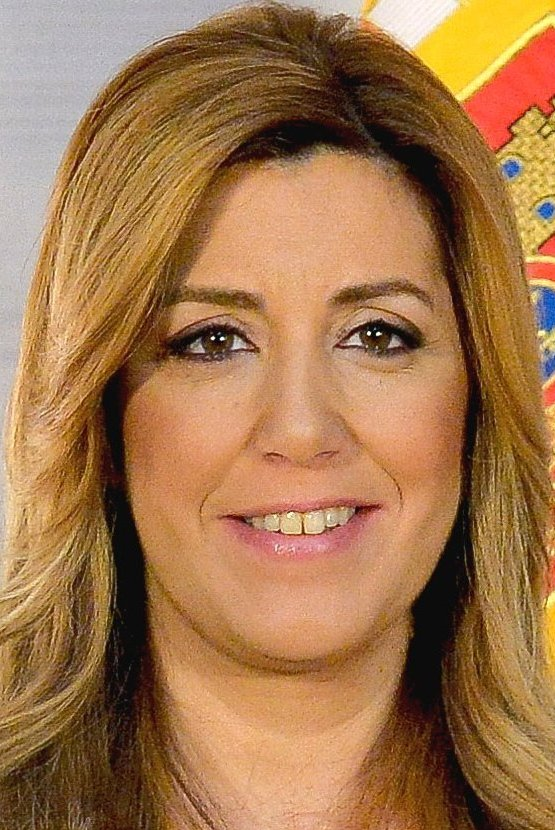
Susana Díaz

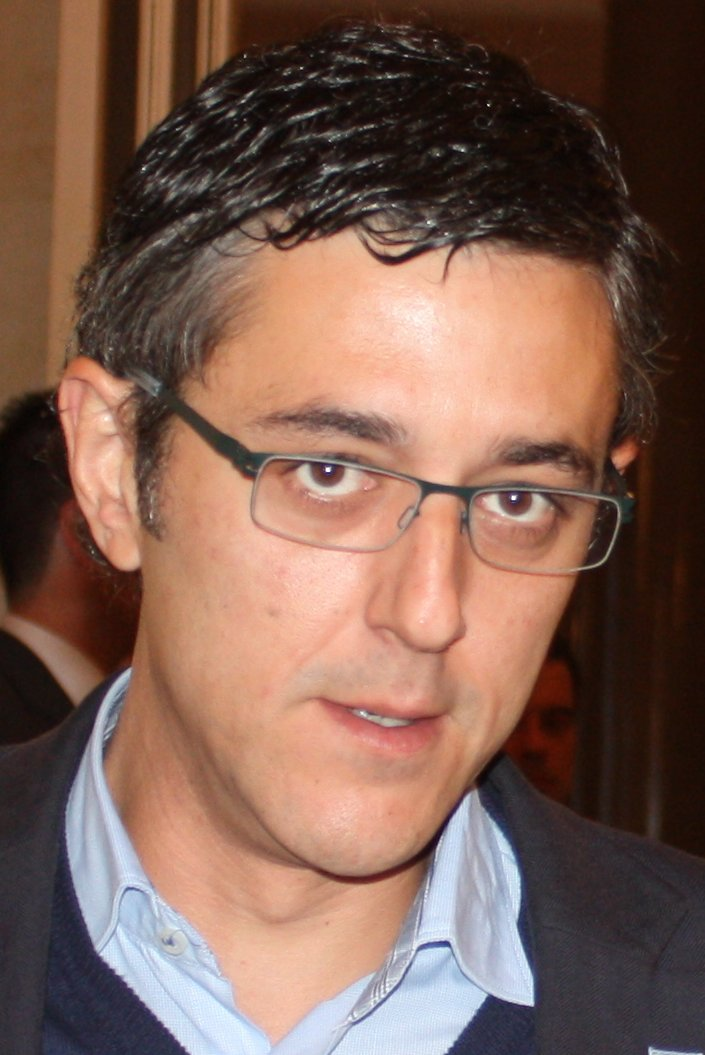
Eduardo Madina
- Carme Chacón (age 44) — Secretary of International Relations of the PSOE (since 2014); Member of the Congress of Deputies for Barcelona (2000–2013); Member of the PSOE Executive Commission (2008–2012); Minister of Defence of Spain (2008–2011); Minister of Housing of Spain (2007–2008); Secretary of Culture of the PSOE (2004–2008); First Vice President of the Congress of Deputies (2004–2007); Secretary of Education, Universities, Culture and Research of the PSOE (2000–2004); First Deputy Mayor of Esplugues de Llobregat (1999–2003); City Councillor of Esplugues de Llobregat (1999–2003).
- Susana Díaz (age 40) — President of the Regional Government of Andalusia (since 2013); Secretary-General of the PSOE–A (since 2013); Member of the Parliament of Andalusia for Seville (since 2008); Minister of the Presidency and Equality of Andalusia (2012–2013); Secretary-General of the PSOE–A in the province of Seville (2012–2013); Senator appointed by the Parliament of Andalusia (2011–2012); Secretary of Organization of the PSOE–A (2010–2012); Secretary of Organization of the PSOE–A in the province of Seville (2004–2010); Member of the Congress of Deputies for Seville (2004–2008); Deputy Mayor for Human Resources in Seville (2003–2004); City Councillor of Seville (1999–2004); Secretary of Organization of the JSA (1997–2004).
- Eduardo Madina (age 39) — Member of the Congress of Deputies for Biscay (since 2004); Secretary-General of the Socialist Parliamentary Group in the Congress (2009–2014); Member of the PSOE Executive Commission (2008–2014); City Councillor of Sestao (1999–2001).

== Endorsements ==
Summary of candidate endorsement results
Candidate	Party members		
Candidate	Count	% T	% V
Pedro Sánchez	27,249	14.05	99.31
Sergio Cebolla	156	0.08	0.57
Pedro Antonio Ibáñez	22	0.01	0.08
Manuel Pérez	9	0.00	0.03
Manuel Castro	1	0.00	0.00
Total	27,437		
Valid endorsements	27,437	14.14	
Not endorsing	~166,563	85.86	
Total members	~194,000		

Endorsements by party members
Sánchez	99.31%
Cebolla	0.57%
Ibáñez	0.08%
Pérez	0.03%
Castro	0.00%

== Opinion polls ==
Poll results are listed in the tables below in reverse chronological order, showing the most recent first, and using the date the survey's fieldwork was done, as opposed to the date of publication. If such date is unknown, the date of publication is given instead. The highest percentage figure in each polling survey is displayed in bold, and the background shaded in the candidate's colour. In the instance of a tie, the figures with the highest percentages are shaded. Polls show data gathered among PSOE voters/supporters as well as Spanish voters as a whole, but not among party members, who were the ones ultimately entitled to vote in the primary election.

=== PSOE voters ===
Polling firm/Commissioner	Fieldwork date	Sample size				Other /None	Question	Lead
Polling firm/Commissioner	Fieldwork date	Sample size	Sánchez (Inc.)	Chacón	Díaz	Other /None	Question	Lead
Sigma Dos/El Mundo	26–29 Jan 2015	? (Note: In Andalusia.)	**42.1**	16.5	34.2	–	7.1	7.9

=== Spanish voters ===
Polling firm/Commissioner	Fieldwork date	Sample size				Other /None	Question	Lead
Polling firm/Commissioner	Fieldwork date	Sample size	Sánchez (Inc.)	Chacón	Díaz	Other /None	Question	Lead
Sigma Dos/El Mundo	26–29 Jan 2015	1,800	**33.9**	17.5	27.2	–	21.3	6.7

== Bibliography ==
- PSOE Federal Committee (18 January 2014). "Reglamento federal para la elección de candidatos o candidatas por el sistema de primarias abiertas" (PDF) (in Spanish). Spanish Socialist Workers' Party.
- PSOE Executive Commission (30 May 2015). "Primarias. Elección de candidato/a a la Presidencia del Gobierno de España. Bases de Convocatoria" (PDF) (in Spanish). Spanish Socialist Workers' Party.
- Pascual Bueno, Ernesto M. (2016). Selección de Líderes y Candidatos a la Presidencia del Gobierno (1976-2016). "El jardín secreto del PSOE" (PDF) (PhD) (in Spanish). Barcelona: Universidad Autónoma de Barcelona.
