= 2016 PSOE leadership crisis =

Spanish political conflict

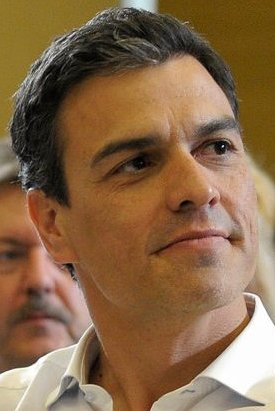
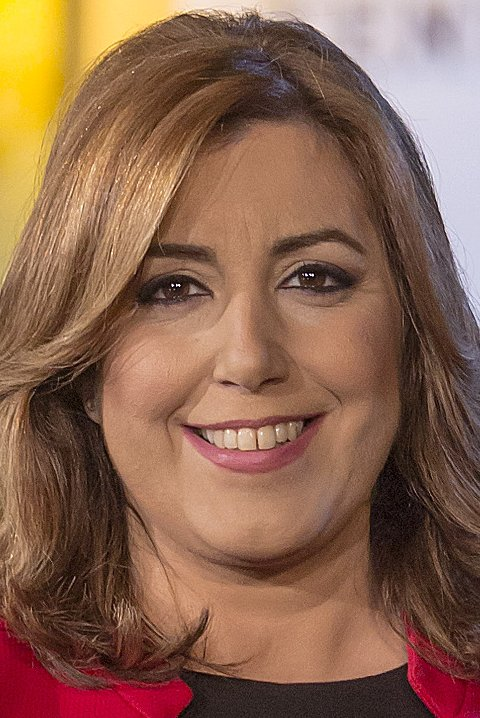
- Pedro Sánchez and Susana Díaz's long-standing antagonism erupted culminated in a party revolt that saw Sánchez's ouster as leader
- Date: 26 September – 1 October 2016
- Cause: Leadership dispute between PSOE leader Pedro Sánchez and Andalusian president Susana Díaz; Internal discontent with Sánchez's leadership; Disappointing results in the 2015 and 2016 Spanish general elections; Sánchez's stance during the 2015–2016 Spanish government formation; Outcome of the 2016 Galician and Basque elections
- Motive: Pressure on Pedro Sánchez to resign, prompted by the resignation of a majority of the PSOE's executive committee
- Outcome: Resignation of Pedro Sánchez as party leader; Caretaker committee established under Javier Fernández; PSOE subsequently agrees to allow the formation of a new Spanish government under Mariano Rajoy; 2017 PSOE federal party congress

A leadership crisis emerged within the Spanish Socialist Workers' Party (PSOE), starting on 26 September 2016, amid internal party dissatisfaction with the party's secretary-general, Pedro Sánchez, and a string of election losses and poor results. These circumstances resulted in a party revolt to force Sánchez's dismissal on 28 September, in an episode lasting until 1 October. The ensuing power vacuum and Sánchez's replacement by an interim managing committee, coupled with the party's U-turn to allow a minority government under the People's Party (PP) and its leader, Mariano Rajoy, after a 10-month deadlock on government formation, and the resulting worsening of relations with its sister party in Catalonia, the Socialists' Party of Catalonia (PSC), triggered a crisis of a scale unprecedented in the party's 137 years of existence.

The then president of Andalusia, Susana Díaz, had been long considered the most prominent critic of Sánchez and a potential contender for the party's leadership, being the leader of the largest and most important PSOE regional branch and, for years, the only person within the party holding an institutional position of relevance. Ever since Sánchez's first election as PSOE leader—helped by Díaz's own manoeuvres to hold off Eduardo Madina—distrust and rivalry over the party's leadership and political strategy increased between the two.

After the 2015 and 2016 general elections had resulted in the worst electoral results for the PSOE in its recent history, pressure on Sánchez increased. His record as party leader had alienated many of his former allies and pushed them towards Díaz's sphere. The immediate trigger to the crisis was the poor PSOE showing in the Basque and Galician elections in September 2016, which led critics to call for Sánchez's resignation. Sánchez held out and responded by announcing a party leadership race for October–December which he would contest, enraging dissenters and prompting half the members of the party executive committee—the party's day-to-day ruling body—to resign on 28 September. Sánchez refused to step down and entrenched himself within the party's headquarters, generating the largest crisis in the PSOE's history as neither side acknowledged the legitimacy of the other to act in the party's behalf. This situation ended when Sánchez resigned after losing a key ballot in a meeting of the party's federal committee on 1 October, being replaced by a caretaker committee and leaving behind a shattered PSOE.

Commentators predicted that this set of events would allow the party to abstain in a hypothetical Rajoy's investiture, something which was confirmed on 23 October when the party's federal committee chose to backflip and allow the formation of a new PP government in order to prevent a third election from happening. The PSC—associated with the PSOE since 1978—would not abide by the committee's decision and break party discipline, together with eight other PSOE deputies which rejected allowing Rajoy's investiture as prime minister of Spain. Sánchez resigned his seat in the Congress of Deputies and announced a new run for the PSOE leadership in the incoming leadership contest in May 2017, which he would win handily.

== Background ==
Pedro Sánchez, a member of the PSOE unknown to the public and much of the party membership, succeeded Alfredo Pérez Rubalcaba as Secretary-General of the Spanish Socialist Workers' Party on 26 July 2014 at a party extraordinary congress, having won a leadership election held earlier that month with 48.7% of the membership vote to Eduardo Madina's 36.2%. Andalusia President Susana Díaz's support for Sánchez to hold off Madina was a determining factor in Sánchez's victory, as the party's Andalusian membership voted overwhelmingly in favour of Sánchez. Madina's move to trigger a primary election forced Díaz—who was said to be seeking an election by acclamation—out of the leadership race, prompting her to support Sánchez in order to prevent a potential Madina victory.

However, the alliance between Sánchez and Díaz was short-lived. Díaz reportedly intended to become the PSOE candidate for the 2015 general election, putting her support behind Sánchez's election in exchange for Sánchez later paving the way for her arrival. However, Sánchez's own political aspirations, coupled with his perceived failure to cope successfully with the newly-founded Podemos party's growth in opinion polls, as well as personal differences, caused both leaders to grow increasingly distrustful of each other. Díaz took advantage of growing criticism of Sánchez's behaviour among party members, seeking to sway their views in her favour and increase her strength in terms of the growing rivalry between the two. Such was the criticism of Sánchez within the party that it succeeded in causing prominent PSOE members and former rivals such as Eduardo Madina and Susana Díaz, Alfredo Pérez Rubalcaba and Carme Chacón, Felipe González and José Luis Rodríguez Zapatero, as well as six out of the seven PSOE regional presidents, to abandon their long-standing feuds and unite against Sánchez.

=== Government formation ===
The 2015 general election had resulted in the most-fragmented parliament in decades, and the PSOE obtaining its worst election result since the Spanish transition to democracy, with 90 seats and 22.0% of the vote. Podemos and its allies together garnered 69 seats and 20.7%, fairly close to PSOE and threatening the party's hegemony as the main leftist political force in Spain. Under these circumstances, Pedro Sánchez came under criticism for the poor results, as well as for his handling of the post-election situation. Then-acting Prime Minister Mariano Rajoy and C's leader Albert Rivera both suggested a grand coalition between their parties and PSOE, but this proposal met with opposition from Sánchez, who preferred to study alternative pacts. Pablo Iglesias of Podemos laid out stiff terms to even consider starting negotiations for a coalition with the PSOE, whereas Susana Díaz warned Sánchez that the party's position on coalition deals had to be decided "within a federal committee and not by the Secretary General", in a move seen as an attempt to limit Sánchez's autonomy in pact-management.

A party federal committee—the highest party decision-making body between congresses—was held on 28 December, outlining the PSOE's pact policy, including an express rejection of any pact with PP, or negotiations with parties that supported self-determination—Catalan separatist parties, ERC and DL, but also Podemos, which had supported a referendum on independence for Catalonia as an election pledge. Sánchez's critics did not hide their desire for Sánchez to be replaced by someone else at the next party congress, due for February, to which Sánchez responded by suggesting a postponement of the congress until after the formation of a government. The idea met with strong opposition from critics, who publicly proclaimed that the congress should be held "when it is due". Susana Díaz was said to be seeking to replace Sánchez as PSOE leader herself and eventually lead the party into a new general election, securing the support of several party factions which deemed Sánchez's leadership too weak and unreliable in the event of a new general election being held. Valencian President Ximo Puig said during an interview that "if a new election is held, the PSOE must consider a change of candidate" while Castile-La Mancha President Emiliano García-Page commented that "no one disputes the ability of Susana Diaz to be Prime Minister".

Debate over the date for the party congress focused on two clashing positions: that of the party's leadership, headed by Sánchez, who wished the congress to be held in June, and that of Sánchez's dissenters, who favoured it being held as early as April. The result was a victory for the critics' position during another federal committee held on 30 January, where the dates for both the party primary and congress were set for May. This meant that the leadership contest would be over in time for the event of a snap general election, which would not be held until June at the least. However, after Pedro Sánchez announced he would allow party members to vote on any deal he reached with other parties, the Committee allowed Pedro Sánchez to try to reach an agreement to be appointed prime minister, as long as he respected the agreed pact-making red lines.

Party sources indicated the high likelihood of Susana Díaz's candidacy if Sánchez failed in his attempt at becoming prime minister. On 1 February, leaked recordings from the party's federal committee held two days earlier revealed Susana Díaz openly questioning Pedro Sánchez's performance throughout the month after the general election. She, alongside other regional party leaders, highlighted the party's red lines for negotiation and argued strongly against any possibility of an agreement with Podemos, intending to hamper Sánchez's chances of becoming prime minister. After Sánchez's two failed investiture votes, sources reported Susana Díaz as being determined to challenge Sánchez for the party's leadership, but viewing as undesirable the prospect of an attempt to open the issue of the PSOE succession amid government formation negotiations and with a new election looming for 26 June. Now seeking to postpone the congress, on 28 March it was decided that the PSOE leadership race should be delayed "indefinitely" "until the formation of a new government".

== Timeline ==
=== Lead up to events ===
For months, the internal situation within the PSOE remained at a standstill. Criticism of Sánchez by party dissenters for his hardline stance on Rajoy's investiture, said to be a contributing factor to the country's political deadlock, had been kept at bay by the party's performance in the 2016 general election, with threats from Sánchez's critics to hold him to account for a hypothetical party collapse on 26 June narrowly failing to materialize. This all changed in the run-up to the Basque and Galician regional elections, scheduled for late September 2016. The PSOE branches in both regions were widely seen as being among Sánchez's supporters, prompting dissenters to frame the elections as a test of Sánchez and of the broader political mood in Spain after nine months of political impasse. Party figures such as regional premiers Susana Díaz (Andalusia), Guillermo Fernández Vara (Extremadura), Javier Lambán (Aragon) and Emiliano García-Page (Castile-La Mancha); as well as former figures such as Alfredo Pérez Rubalcaba (Sánchez's predecessor as PSOE leader), Eduardo Madina (Sánchez's rival in the party's 2014 leadership contest), Elena Valenciano (former PSOE deputy leader) and Carme Chacón (former Defence Minister), all became involved in a series of disputes with the national party leadership in the weeks leading up to the regional elections, weakening Sánchez's standing and indicating a loss of support within the party.

=== 26–27 September ===
The poor PSOE showing in both Galicia and the Basque Country, being overtaken by Podemos-led alliances and polling record low results, prompted dissenters—led by Susana Díaz—to call for Sánchez's immediate resignation on 26 September. Sánchez refused to step down and announced his plan to hold a party primary election on 23 October, daring his critics to challenge him in a back-me-or-sack-me vote. This move further enraged his opponents, who considered staging a revolt in the federal committee scheduled for 1 October, seeking to topple Sánchez and cancel his plan to hold an early party congress. With party discipline breaking down rapidly, Sánchez's supporters praised his plan to hold an "express" party primary and called for "all out war!" against dissenters, suggesting that the Sánchez–Díaz feud over leadership and political strategy had resulted in a deeply divided party fighting for its very existence.

On 27 September, in her first public statements after Sánchez's gamble, Susana Díaz hinted at the possibility of becoming leader of the PSOE, expressing her discomfort with Sánchez's plan to hold a party primary and congress in October while reminding the incumbent PSOE leader of his many electoral defeats throughout his tenure, in contrast to Díaz's own electoral performance in the 2015 Andalusian regional election. Concurrently, a majority within the party's parliamentary group in the Congress of Deputies voiced their opposition to Sánchez's plans to hold a party congress.

=== 28 September ===
Former Socialist Prime Minister Felipe González added to the pressure on Sánchez by declaring that the PSOE was in no condition to attempt to form a government themselves, while stating that he felt "cheated" because Sánchez had told him on 29 June that he would abstain in the second round of voting for Rajoy's investiture. Sánchez's statements during an interview held earlier in the day claiming González to be "on the [Rajoy's investiture] abstention side" and rhetorically asking "I'd like to know on which side Susana Díaz is", coupled with an earlier warning that he would not step down even if 1 October federal committee voted down his plans for a party congress in late 2016, were said to be the straw that broke the camel's back for open revolution to unfold within the party.

News emerged that opponents of Sánchez planned to stage a mass resignation from the PSOE federal executive committee, the party's day-to-day governing body—according to party rules, the resignation or vacancy of 51% of its members would force the Secretary General to resign. Upon learning of this, Pedro Sánchez went further and dared them to do so if they "did not feel committed" to his project, prompting dissenters to act ahead of schedule and resulting in 17 executive members, the required majority, resigning from their posts on 28 September. This triggered the body's dissolution, theoretically prompting Sánchez's resignation.

The 17 resigning executive members
| Micaela Navarro | President; 2nd Vice President of the Congress of Deputies |
| Antonio Pradas | Secretary for Federal Policy |
| María José Sánchez Rubio | Secretary for Health |
| Estefanía Martín Palop | Secretary for Training |
| Noemí Cruz | Secretary for Development Cooperation |
| Javier Francisco Pizarro Ruiz | At-large member |
| Juan Pablo Durán | Federal executive member |
| Emiliano García-Page | At-large member; President of Castile-La Mancha |
| Manuela Galiano | Secretary for Small Municipalities |
| María Luz Rodríguez Fernández | Secretary for Labour |
| Ximo Puig | Secretary for Democratic Reforms; President of the Valencian Government |
| Tomás Gómez | At-large member |
| Eva Matarín | Secretary for Immigration |
| Carme Chacón | Secretary for International Relations; former Minister of Defence |
| José Miguel Pérez García | Secretary for Education |
| Carlos Pérez Anadón | At-large member |
| María Ascensión Murillo | At-large member |

Sánchez, however, refused to resign and remained in his position, with rebels responding that Sánchez no longer had "any legitimacy to take decisions in the party's name" and urging him to "acknowledge party rules". Sánchez was determined to keep the remaining executive functioning—now fully supportive of him after the critics' resignations—and rejected its dissolution, summoning it for an emergency meeting on the following day.

=== 29 September ===
By the next day, the PSOE had descended further into chaos, as both sides refused to recognize the other's legitimacy to act and clashed on the interpretation of party rules, with Sánchez barricading himself in the party's headquarters in Calle de Ferraz (Spanish for Ferraz street), Madrid, as his supporters accused dissenters of "staging a coup". Critics proclaimed that they were now in control of the party, and Verónica Pérez, President of the federal committee and pupil of Susana Díaz, claimed herself to be "the only authority that exists in the PSOE, whether [Sánchez's supporters] like it or not" under party rules. Dissenters sought to convene the party's guarantees federal commission—an independent body tasked with resolving disputes within the party—to forcibly depose Sánchez, but Sánchez's supporters argued that they had no right to summon the guarantees commission and that their actions were "void". Nonetheless, three of the five commission members demanded that the body be convened and accused Sánchez of "preventing them from acting", stating they would issue a dictum themselves if the body was not convened within 24 hours.

Sánchez persisted with his intention to stage a primary and congress, and set a timetable with hastened deadlines for them to be held. Party members found themselves evenly split between those that supported him and were "deeply embarrassed" by the "show" being staged by his opponents, and those that demanded Sánchez's removal and the establishment of a caretaker committee to replace him in the interim. The fracture deepened as the crisis spread through the regions, with regional party branches picking sides either for or against Sánchez. Susana Díaz, in her first public speech after the revolt, criticized Sánchez's record as party leader, accusing him of being motivated "out of personal interest" and offering herself to reconcile the party. Díaz would seek instead to have the party congress be held "in due time", only after the political deadlock in Spain had been solved.

=== 30 September ===
On 30 September, both sides were reportedly readying themselves for the meeting of the PSOE's 295-member federal committee scheduled for Saturday, 1 October. While the meeting of top party officials was initially expected to analyze the regional election results and to discuss and update the party's position on any future investiture, new developments had made the meeting key to determining the party's short-term future. The crippled PSOE executive committee under Sánchez had convened the previous day to call a new federal committee for the same day and time as initially scheduled, now with the intention of approving Sánchez's plan to hold an extraordinary congress to renew the party's leadership. Critics declared the new convention "illegal", instead only recognizing the meeting called for that date by the fully functional executive before the revolt. This meant that the two factions intended to hold two separate meetings, but at the same time and place. Meanwhile, 'officialists' supportive of Sánchez struggled to keep control over the parliamentary party in the Congress of Deputies, with just half the 84 PSOE deputies remaining loyal to Sánchez and the rest siding with the rebels. Also, for the first time since the mass resignation from the federal executive committee, Sánchez's supporters acknowledged their status as an "interim" PSOE executive.

Attempts from both sides to reach some sort of compromise to prevent all out war from raging at the next day's federal committee failed, with the two factions' positions seemingly irreconcilable in the short term. Police intervention was required ahead of Saturday's meeting to deal with possible unrest between party members in the area around the Madrid headquarters as the interim leadership pleaded with party supporters for "serenity" and "prudence" to prevent the conflict from escalating further. After Sánchez chose not to convene the guarantees commission until after the federal committee, the three Sánchez critics on the commission issued a report endorsing the executive committee's dissolution and calling for the federal committee to fill the power vacuum. They also deemed that party rules did not provide for the "interim" status that Sánchez's executive had conferred upon itself, with any decision adopted in such circumstances being "completely without any statutory validity and null and void". Pedro Sánchez immediately held a press conference—his first since the crisis started—and challenged dissenters to vote on the party's position on a future Rajoy investiture vote, promising to step down if the federal committee decided to support an abstention. However, Sánchez's critics were undeterred, retaining their plan to depose Sánchez in Saturday's meeting nonetheless.

=== 1 October ===
The two factions vying for control of PSOE faced the federal committee with no prospect of reconciliation and with diametrically opposing views. Pedro Sánchez's officialists sought to retain control of the leadership until a congress to be held soon thereafter. Critics under Susana Díaz intended to take full control of the party by deposing Sánchez in the party assembly and appointing a caretaker team—expected to be headed by Díaz's close ally Javier Fernández, Asturian President—that would deal with the political consequences of allowing a PP government. The party would then take time to hold a "refoundation congress" and a party primary which Díaz would contest unopposed. The party was said to be at the brink of splitting into two if no peaceful solution to the conflict could be found quickly.

Initially scheduled to begin at 9:00 CEST, disagreements between the two factions over the meeting's agenda and voting census delayed the start of the federal committee meeting by several hours. Seeking to gain time, Sánchez proposed readmitting the 17 executive members who had resigned three days previously and calling the committee to convene the next week, but the rebels rejected this, declaring that they did not recognize him as party leader and describing Sánchez's move as "insulting". Sánchez repeatedly blocked Díaz's attempts to vote on his position as the two sides failed to agree on the purpose of the committee. In the meantime, the ongoing turmoil attracted hundreds of journalists, policemen, party members and curious observers, who gathered outside the party's headquarters throughout the day.

Sánchez tried to force a secret ballot on his proposal for a party congress, but it was suspended after critics claimed the ballot box was "hidden" and unsupervised, accusing Sánchez of vote rigging. This action was said to have cost Sánchez support among his allies and prompted rebels to start procedures to trigger a censure motion against him. This was rejected by Sánchez's supporters controlling the assembly, despite the rebels collecting the signatures of more than half of committee members—thus ensuring Sánchez would have been ousted had the vote been allowed. Amid the turmoil, some people, including Susana Díaz herself, were reported to have broken down in tears, while Sánchez's supporters denounced an attempted assault on Pedro Sánchez by Díaz's deputy, Juan Cornejo.

An agreement was finally reached between the two factions to vote again on Sánchez's congress proposal—this time by a show of hands—linking the outcome of the vote to Sánchez remaining in his post. Pedro Sánchez lost the ballot by 132 to 107, prompting him to resign as PSOE leader. Following the vote, Sánchez's critics appointed a caretaker commission to lead the party temporarily until a party congress could be held. It was implied that the events of this day may help pave the way for the formation of a new government and put an end to nine months of political deadlock, as the rebels considered an abstention in a potential forthcoming vote on Rajoy's investiture.

== Reactions ==
Members from the People's Party refused to get involved in the PSOE crisis and said they would not "comment on other parties' issues", just calling for the party to "solve its problems soon" so it could put an end to the political deadlock. Nonetheless, PP leaders were said to be "incredulous" and "concerned" with "all that was happening within PSOE", worried at the prospect of a party fracture that would leave Podemos as the dominant leftist force in Spanish politics. Foreign Minister José Manuel García-Margallo said that PSOE's situation was "schizophrenic" and that the party could not "afford for a new general election to be held at this time". In contrast, Podemos leaders openly accused PSOE rebels of committing "fraud" by attempting to remove Sánchez through "undemocratic means", with the ultimate goal of ending the deadlock by helping Rajoy to get re-elected. Podemos' Secretary General Pablo Iglesias described the PSOE's turmoil as "the most important crisis since the end of the Civil War, in the most important Spanish party of the past century". Leaders from Citizens commented that the PSOE had to "take this opportunity" to "allow for a PP government checked from opposition".

Sánchez's supporters gathered at the PSPV headquarters in Valencia on 29 September to denounce Ximo Puig's support in the revolt against the PSOE leader, with chants of "Coup plotters out from the Socialist Party!" and "Ximo liar" being heard. The PSC announced its support for Sánchez by planning to bring buses from Terrassa and other towns in Catalonia to Madrid in a show of their allegiance to the Secretary General, but this was later suspended after Sánchez's executive appealed to party members' serenity to prevent conflict from escalating further. Nonetheless, party members who gathered outside PSOE's headquarters in Madrid shouted at critics attending the meeting by calling them "traitors" and "coup plotters", as chants against Susana Díaz and in support of Pedro Sánchez were heard.

Reactions to Pedro Sánchez's resignation were mixed. Podemos leader Pablo Iglesias commented that "supporters of a PP government have imposed themselves on PSOE" and called for opponents of the coup to rally behind Podemos as the only remaining leftist alternative in Spain to a Rajoy government. C's leader Albert Rivera praised Susana Díaz's move and called for the PSOE to "help form a government". Sánchez's ouster was reported as being "the most turbulent event" in the party's history, with some regarding the whole event as "shameful". Odón Elorza, former San Sebastián mayor and one of those present at the federal committee, stated that party colleagues had become "hopelessly crazy" and accused them of "killing the party". Some remarked that the party had emerged "fatally shattered", with the assembly "ending in the worst way possible". Others commented that PSOE had chosen to "commit suicide" after the "sorry spectacle" it had offered, with PSOE member and former minister Javier Solana commenting of Sánchez's poor election results—cited as one of the motives behind his ejection—that "when they become aware of the damages, they will all prefer 85 deputies". Former minister and Sánchez ally Jordi Sevilla said he was leaving the party because he felt "deeply embarrassed" at the whole event.

Shortly after Pedro Sánchez had been sacked as party leader by the federal committee, while its members were appointing a caretaker team to replace him in the interim, the PSOE was the subject of a prank consisting of a massive pizza delivery. Members of both the ForoCoches and La Retaguardia forums had allegedly paid for the prank, with the latter posting a bill for €117 for the delivery on their Twitter account. More pranks were staged over the following days, with several mariachi bands congregating at Ferraz's door to play songs caricaturing the figures of Pedro Sánchez and Susana Díaz.

== Subsequent events ==
=== U-turn on investiture ===
Javier Fernández was appointed to chair the interim managing body that would lead the party in the following months. While stating in a press conference on 3 October that the party remained opposed both to an abstention and a third election, he accepted that one of the two outcomes had to materialize eventually and asserted that "abstaining does not mean supporting Rajoy". However, he acknowledged that such a decision was a matter for a new federal committee and not his caretaker team. Ximo Puig, one of the most prominent critics of Pedro Sánchez and a key figure in his sacking, argued against any PSOE facilitation of a Rajoy government and maintained the party should maintain its previous 'no' stance. Susana Díaz, leader of the party rebellion and favourite to be picked as PSOE's new secretary general in the forthcoming congress, refused to reveal her stance on Rajoy's investiture and called for "leaving the [caretaker] committee to act", lamenting the "international spectacle" of "Saturday's federal committee".

Fernández was aware that a revolt could break out within the party's parliamentary group if the decision—not planned to be submitted to the party's membership—to let Rajoy rule was taken. Substantial tension arose between the different factions within the parliamentary party as the Socialists' Party of Catalonia (PSC)—PSOE sister party in Catalonia—announced its 7 MPs would vote against Rajoy regardless of PSOE's final stance. Fernández replied to PSC's threat by maintaining that the party would not allow its deputies to break party discipline and vote in conscience, while deeming a new election as "the worst solution" for both PSOE and the country. A growing number of PSOE deputies followed the PSC line, refusing to be held accountable for the establishment of a new PP government. This included the Socialist Balearic, Basque and Cantabrian branches, as well as numerous deputies still loyal to former secretary general Pedro Sánchez—and Sánchez himself, who still kept his seat in Congress. Hoping to reduce the risk of a breakdown in party discipline during the vote for Rajoy's investiture, some PSOE members laid out an alternative plan that called for eleven deputies to either abstain or be absent during the vote, ensuring Rajoy would get elected if he could maintain the parliamentary support obtained during his first investiture attempt. Susana Díaz's PSOE–A rejected this manoeuvre and called for all deputies to keep party unity and respect the decision taken in a new federal committee scheduled for 23 October. Díaz's deputy, Juan Cornejo, suggested that MPs refusing to "abide by the federal committee's decision"—in the eventuality an abstention to Rajoy was decided—should resign their seats.

Opinion polls conducted after the party crisis showed plummeting support for PSOE, with advocates of abstention arguing that it was no longer Rajoy's post under discussion, but whether he would be elected now or after a third election, expected to result in a landslide win for the PP. Members of the party's caretaker leadership were convinced they would be able to push the abstention choice through in the party's federal committee, but remained afraid this move would likely widen the rift opened within the party. At a meeting of the parliamentary party on 18 October, a majority of PSOE MPs expressed their support for abstention, while calling for "dedramatizing" this choice, but a faction of the party's group remained opposed. In a new convening of the PSOE federal committee on 23 October the party chose by a vote of 139 to 96 to unconditionally allow a Rajoy minority government through an abstention once Congress considered Rajoy's candidacy for a second time. However, party members clashed on how this decision was to materialize in terms of party discipline after some deputies declared they would not abide by the committee's decision regardless the outcome, with critics to the caretaker commission demanding for the party to allow them to vote in conscience. Javier Fernández, however, rejected this notion and confirmed the PSOE would abstain wholly with each deputy abstaining "literally".

=== PSOE–PSC rupture ===
When PSOE voted to abstain in the second round of Rajoy's investiture and allow the formation of a PP minority government, most opponents of this decision agreed to respect the majority opinion within the party and maintain party discipline. However, some deputies declared that they intended to vote against Rajoy nonetheless, even in the face of threats of retaliation from the party. Among these were Aragonese Susana Sumelzo, Basque Odon Elorza, independent for Madrid Margarita Robles, Galician Rocío de Frutos, and the two Balearic Islands MPs. MP for New Canaries Pedro Quevedo—with whom PSOE had agreed an electoral alliance in the Canary Islands for the 2015 and 2016 elections—also announced his intention to vote against Rajoy. Pedro Sánchez's final stance on such a vote remained unclear, with some sources suggesting he would break the party line and others that he would not attend the investiture, in order to avoid having to abstain.

However, the most serious rebellion to the party's directive came from the Socialists' Party of Catalonia, with PSC leader Miquel Iceta signalling his intention to disregard the committee's decision to abstain and maintain a 'no' stance. Members from the party's governing committee stressed that the decision taken by the party's federal committee was binding for all MPs and that if PSC chose to vote otherwise, the relationship between the two parties would have to be reviewed. Some interpreted this to mean that public disobedience from the PSC could result in its expulsion from the parliamentary group as well as from PSOE's governing bodies, and even lead to the end of the alliance between the parties, in place since 1978. Eight regional party branches critical of the abstention called on Fernández to authorize only eleven MPs to abstain—the minimum number required for Rajoy's investiture vote to pass—so as to prevent further splits, but he replied that the federal committee's decision was final and that a "minimum abstention" of this kind was not up for discussion.

By late 24 October, the party's interim leadership predicted that about 15 deputies would rebel and threatened them with outright expulsion from the party, into the unaffiliated grouping in Congress. However, this move backfired when a further group of MPs, opposed to abstention but initially willing to follow the party line, condemned any retaliation against conscience voters and expressed their willingness to join the rebel faction in solidarity with the PSC. By 25 October, with a new investiture hearing scheduled for 26–29 October, a total of 18 deputies were said to be willing to break the party line regardless of the consequences, and a further three were considering it "because of the threats issued by the managing committee's spokespeople"; the expulsion of all these MPs would have left Unidos Podemos as the largest opposition group in Congress. Later that day, the PSC leadership formally agreed on their 'no' position, appealing to PSOE "to accept differences and manage discrepancies" and calling for both parties to "keep walking together" as Iceta sought to prevent the split, but PSOE replied that this decision represented a "unilateral breach" of the relationship between the parties.

On 28 October, it was reported that the PSC was exploring the possibility of contesting the next Catalan regional election in alliance with Ada Colau's En Comú Podem, Podemos' "confluence" alliance in Catalonia. In response, the PSOE started proceedings for the expulsion of the PSC from its governing bodies, and a review of their relationship, to be triggered after Rajoy's investiture.

=== Rajoy's investiture and consequences ===
The second Mariano Rajoy's investiture session started on 26 October at 18:00 UTC. Antonio Hernando, PSOE's spokesperson in Congress and speaking on behalf of the party after Sánchez's dismissal, justified their impending abstention by citing the country's need for a government after months of deadlock. Hernando reiterated that his party still did not trust Rajoy, promising to provide a strong opposition to his policies regardless. Hernando's speech did not convince neither those unwilling to abstain nor Pedro Sánchez himself, who hours before the second and final round of voting announced his resignation as an MP—to avoid either abstaining and break his own electoral pledges or setting a bad precedent of a former PSOE leader breaking party discipline—while hinting at the possibility of standing in a future party leadership election. Finally, 15 PSOE MPs (Margarita Robles, Susana Sumelzo, Odón Elorza, Rocío de Frutos, Zaida Cantera, Meritxell Batet, Joan Ruiz, Merce Perea, Manuel Cruz, Lídia Guinart, Marc Lamuà, Pere Joan, Sofía Hernanz and Luz Martínez) chose to break the party line and vote against Rajoy in spite of the possible consequences threatened by the party's interim leadership. Right after government formation, in an exclusive interview for laSexta's Salvados news show, Pedro Sánchez publicly accused his party's apparatus—led by Susana Díaz—and "financial powers", including El País media outlet, of having coerced him into avoiding a left-wing pact with Podemos and nationalist parties throughout the entire government formation process, revealing they triggered the internal revolt within PSOE to oust him once he considered a serious attempt at forming such a government and after repeatedly opposing to allow a PP government to form.

Throughout the ensuing weeks, the party proceeded to marginalize and "punish" critics in a number of ways. As an immediate consequence, disciplinary procedures were filed against those MPs breaking vote discipline, expected to lead to fines up to €600. Subsequently, a reorganization of the parliamentary group resulted in most rebels being either expelled from the party's parliamentary leadership or degraded in the different parliamentary committees. This affected even some MPs respecting the party line—deputies but also senators, who had no vote in the investiture—that, nonetheless, were critical of the managing committee's direction. This move further aggravated internal differences, being dubbed by those affected as "a shame", "revenge" and "marginalization" for "staying loyal to Sánchez until the end". Meanwhile, the crisis with the PSC remained severe. Members from both parties favoured avoiding a total break up, but PSOE leaders strongly argued for "reviewing" their mutual relationship protocol, in effect since 1978. As both parties set themselves a timetable of two months to review their alliance, the PSOE's managing committee reportedly started preparations to exclude the PSC from the incoming PSOE Federal Congress. This could have the effect of depriving PSC's grassroots members—widely expected to oppose any candidate endorsed by the interim PSOE leadership—of their vote in a foreseeable PSOE primary election to elect a new party leader, easening a possible Susana Díaz's candidacy to the post.
