= 2014 PSOE federal party congress =

- 13 July 2014 (primary); 26−27 July 2014 (congress)

1,019 delegates in the Federal Congress Plurality of delegates needed to win
- Opinion polls
- Registered: Primary: 198,123
- Turnout: Primary: 132,850 (67.1%); Congress: 990 (97.2%)
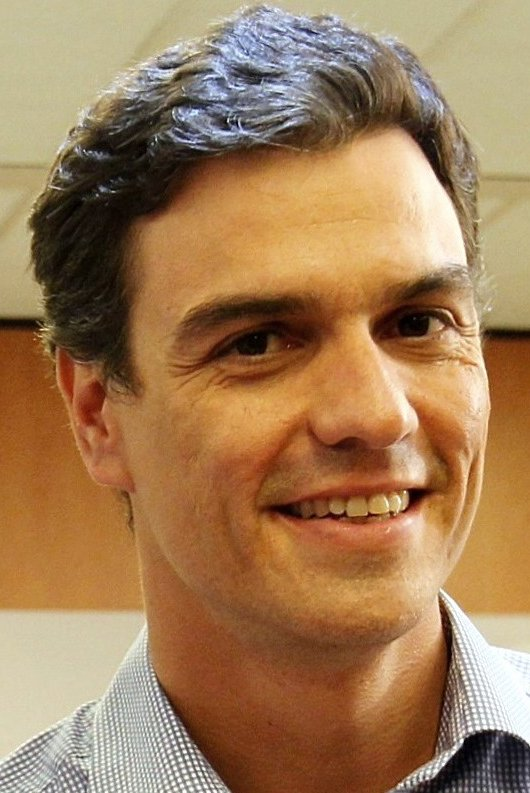

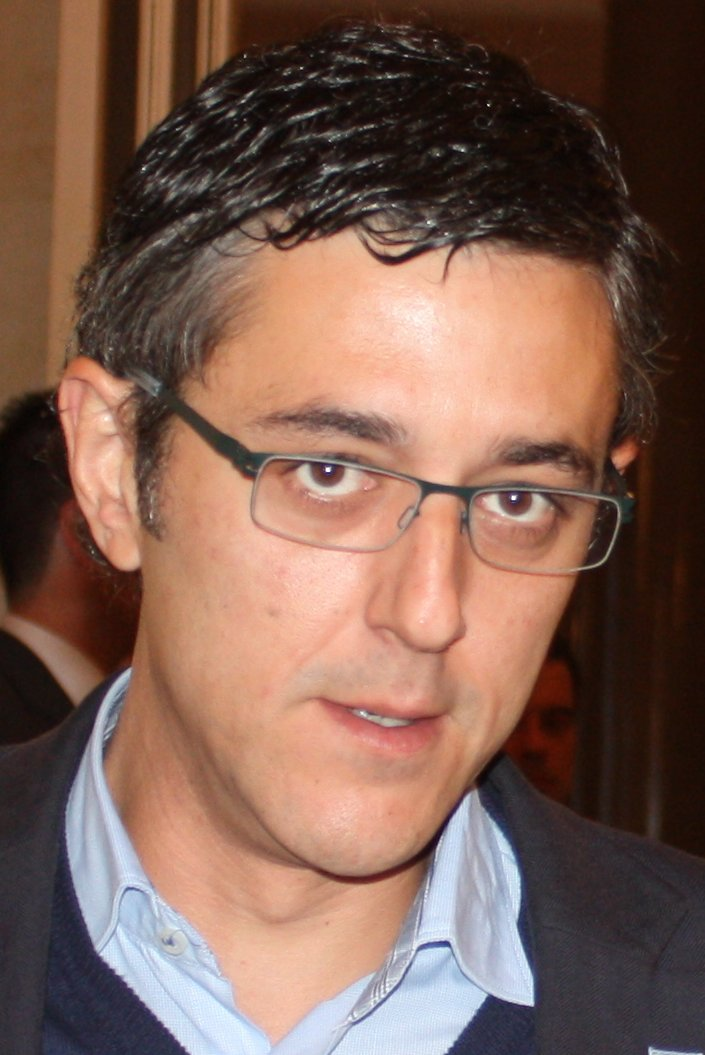

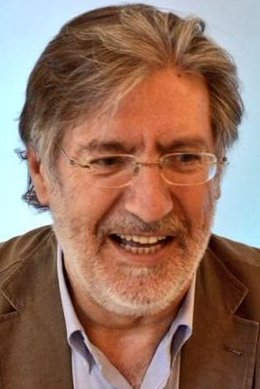
Candidate	Pedro Sánchez	Eduardo Madina	José Antonio Pérez Tapias
Popular vote	64,116 (48.3%)	47,750 (36.0%)	19,869 (15.0%)
Delegate vote	Unopposed	Withdrew	Withdrew
Executive	849 (86.2%)	Withdrew	Withdrew
Party leader before election
Alfredo Pérez Rubalcaba
Party leader after election
Pedro Sánchez

The Spanish Socialist Workers' Party (PSOE) held an extraordinary federal congress in Madrid from 26 to 27 July 2014, to renovate its governing bodies—including the post of secretary-general, which amounted to that of party leader. A primary election to elect the new party secretary-general was held on 13 July.

The congress was called by outgoing PSOE leader Alfredo Pérez Rubalcaba after his party's poor results at the 2014 European Parliament election, garnering just 23% of the vote. Rubalcaba announced his intention not to run for either his party's leadership or for the 2015 Spanish general election.

== Election system ==
This Federal Congress was the first held at a national level in which all party members and affiliates (around 200,000) had the possibility to be consulted, several days before the Congress was held, about which person they wanted to become the new party leader. While not a legally binding ballot, the results were likely to be respected by the 1,000 party delegates which finally elected the new party's Secretary-General. Party members wishing to contend the election were required to gather the endorsement of at least 5% of the party membership before June 27.

== Background ==
The 2011 general election had resulted in a landslide victory for Mariano Rajoy's People's Party (PP), a result of the financial crisis which had been hurting the country's economy since 2008. The ruling Spanish Socialist Workers' Party (PSOE), amidst a climate of high unpopularity, was ousted from power with the worst election result since the first post-Francoist electoral process in 1977. Then prime minister José Luis Rodríguez Zapatero had decided to stand down as PM candidate in early 2011 and as party leader once the quadrennial party congress due for early 2012 was held. Alfredo Pérez Rubalcaba, PSOE candidate for the 2011 election and former Deputy Prime Minister, was elected new Secretary-General in a tight fight against former Minister of Defence Carme Chacón.

However, as the new Rajoy's government was forced to pass new austerity measures and spending cuts, including a harsh labor reform and a very austere state budget for 2012, the new Government's ratings plummeted in opinion polls as it met with widespread protests and two general strikes. Little over 6 months of government had seen support for the PP government plummet from 45% in the general election to 34% in mid-to late 2012 polls, the most support lost by a political party in its first months of government in the country's history.

However, despite the PP's falling ratings, the PSOE found itself unable to regain lost support, suffering from the memory on Zapatero's last government and his economic management, as well as the emergence of major corruption scandals in both parties, regarding possible illegal financing on both the People's Party and the Socialist Party regional government of Andalusia. A series of negative regional election results throughout 2012, coupled with an internal crisis in 2013 and the threat of rupture from the party's Catalonia partner, the Socialists' Party of Catalonia (PSC), further weakened the PSOE, with Rubalcaba's leadership being put into question as his popularity ratings plummeted. The crisis was temporarily settled after the party's political conference in November 2013, with the question on the party's leadership being initially postponed for late 2014.

After the European Parliament election, 2014 culminated in a major election crash for the party, coupled with a spectacular rise in support for newly created Podemos party, Alfredo Pérez Rubalcaba announced his intention not to run as his party's candidate for the 2015 general election and to have the party hold an extraordinary Congress for July 2014.

== Timetable ==
The key dates are listed below:

- 26 May: Official announcement and census closure.
- 6–9 June: Communication of provisional census and period of correction of census incidents.
- 10 June: Communication of definitive census.
- 10–13 June: Presentation of pre-candidates.
- 13–28 June: Endorsement collection period (until 27 June) and provisional candidate proclamations.
- 29 June–2 July: Allegation and definitive candidate proclamations.
- 3–12 July: Information campaign.
- 13 July: Primary election (to elect the Secretary-General).
- 13–19 July: Provincial and insular congresses. Election of delegates and amendment period.
- 26–27 July: Extraordinary federal congress.

== Candidates ==
Candidate	Notable positions	Announced	Ref.
=== Proclaimed ===
Candidates who met endorsement requirements and were officially proclaimed to contest the party congress.
José Antonio Pérez Tapias (age 59)	Member of the Congress of Deputies for Granada (2006–2011)	31 May 2014	
Pedro Sánchez (age 42)	Member of the Congress of Deputies for Madrid (2009–2011 and since 2016); City Councillor of Madrid (2004–2009)	12 June 2014	
Eduardo Madina (age 38)	Secretary-General of the Socialist Parliamentary Group in the Congress (since 2009); Member of the PSOE Executive Commission (since 2008); Member of the Congress of Deputies for Biscay (since 2004); City Councillor of Sestao (1999–2001)	13 June 2014	
=== Failed to qualify ===
Candidates who announced an intention to run, but failed to qualify due to not meeting endorsement requirements.
Alberto Sotillos (age 29)	None (Note: Alberto Sotillos was son of Eduardo Sotillos, former Spokesperson of the Government of Spain under Felipe González between 1982 and 1985.)	11 June 2014	

=== Declined ===
The individuals in this section were the subject of speculation about their possible candidacy, but publicly denied or recanted interest in running:

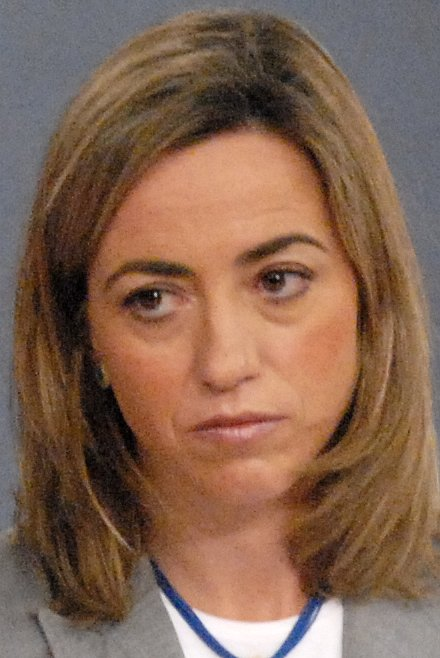
Carme Chacón

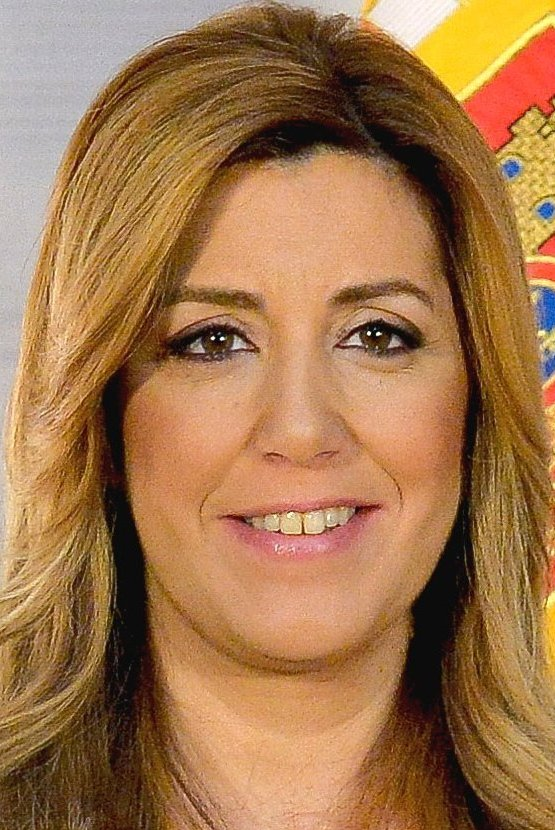
Susana Díaz

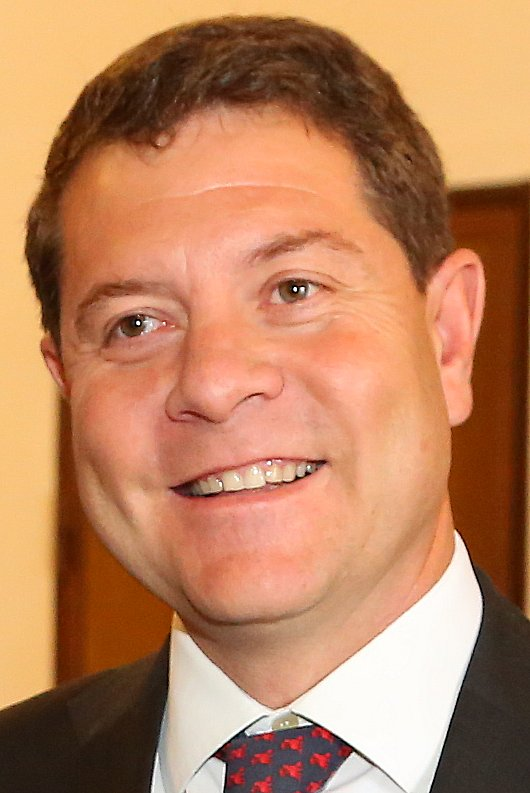
Emiliano García-Page

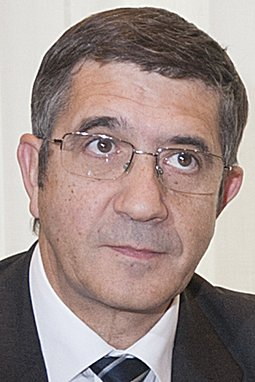
Patxi López

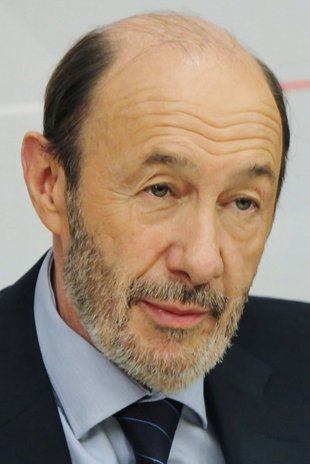
Alfredo Pérez Rubalcaba
- Carme Chacón (age 43) — Member of the Congress of Deputies for Barcelona (2000–2013); Member of the PSOE Executive Commission (2008–2012); Minister of Defence of Spain (2008–2011); Minister of Housing of Spain (2007–2008); Secretary of Culture of the PSOE (2004–2008); First Vice President of the Congress of Deputies (2004–2007); Secretary of Education, Universities, Culture and Research of the PSOE (2000–2004); First Deputy Mayor of Esplugues de Llobregat (1999–2003); City Councillor of Esplugues de Llobregat (1999–2003).
- Susana Díaz (age 39) — President of the Regional Government of Andalusia (since 2013); Secretary-General of the PSOE–A (since 2013); Member of the Parliament of Andalusia for Seville (since 2008); Minister of the Presidency and Equality of Andalusia (2012–2013); Secretary-General of the PSOE–A in the province of Seville (2012–2013); Senator appointed by the Parliament of Andalusia (2011–2012); Secretary of Organization of the PSOE–A (2010–2012); Secretary of Organization of the PSOE–A in the province of Seville (2004–2010); Member of the Congress of Deputies for Seville (2004–2008); Deputy Mayor for Human Resources in Seville (2003–2004); City Councillor of Seville (1999–2004); Secretary of Organization of the JSA (1997–2004).
- Emiliano García-Page (age 46) — Member of the PSOE Executive Commission (since 2012); Senator appointed by the Cortes of Castilla–La Mancha (since 2011); Mayor of Toledo (since 2007); City Councillor of Toledo (1987–1993 and since 2007); Secretary-General of the PSCM–PSOE in the province of Toledo (since 1997); Second Vice President of the Regional Government of Castilla–La Mancha (2005–2007); Member of the Cortes of Castilla–La Mancha for Toledo (1995–2007); Minister of Institutional Relations of Castilla–La Mancha (2004–2005); Spokesperson of the Government of Castilla–La Mancha (1993–1997, 1998–1999 and 2001–2004); Spokesperson of the Socialist Group in the Cortes of Castilla–La Mancha (2000–2001); Minister of Social Welfare of Castilla–La Mancha (1999–2000); Minister of Public Works of Castilla–La Mancha (1997–1998); Deputy Mayor for Celebrations of Toledo (1991–1993).
- Patxi López (age 54) — Member of the Basque Parliament for Álava (since 2012); Secretary of Political Relations of the PSOE (since 2012); Secretary-General of the PSE–EE (PSOE) (since 2002); Lehendakari (2009–2012); Member of the Basque Parliament for Biscay (1991–2012); Secretary-General of the PSE–EE (PSOE) in Biscay (1997–2002); Secretary of Organization of the PSE–EE (PSOE) (1991–1995); Member of the Congress of Deputies for Biscay (1987–1989); Secretary-General of the JSE–EGAZ (1985–1988).
- Alfredo Pérez Rubalcaba (age 62) — Secretary-General of the PSOE (since 2012); Leader of the Opposition of Spain (since 2012); Member of the Congress of Deputies for Madrid (1996–2004 and since 2011); Member of the PSOE Executive Commission (2008–2012); First Deputy Prime Minister of Spain (2010–2011); Spokesperson of the Government (1993–1996 and 2010–2011); Member of the Congress of Deputies for Cádiz (2008–2011); Minister of the Interior of Spain (2006–2011); Member of the Congress of Deputies for Cantabria (2004–2008); Spokesperson of the Socialist Parliamentary Group of the Congress (2004–2006); Secretary of Communication of the PSOE (1997–2000); Minister of the Presidency of Spain (1993–1996); Member of the Congress of Deputies for Toledo (1993–1996); Minister of Education and Science of Spain (1992–1993); Secretary of State of Education of Spain (1988–1992); Secretary-General for Education of Spain (1986–1988); Director-General for University Education of Spain (1985–1986).

== Endorsements ==
Candidates seeking to run were required to collect the endorsements of at least 5% of party members.

Summary of candidate endorsement results
Candidate	Count	% T	% V
Pedro Sánchez	41,338	20.86	54.05
Eduardo Madina	25,238	12.74	32.99
José Antonio Pérez Tapias	9,912	5.00	12.96
Alberto Sotillos	Eliminated (below 5%)		
Total	76,488		
Valid endorsements	76,488	38.61	
Not endorsing	121,635	61.39	
Total members	198,123		

Endorsements by party members
Sánchez	54.05%
Madina	32.99%
Tapias	12.96%

== Opinion polls ==
Poll results are listed in the tables below in reverse chronological order, showing the most recent first, and using the date the survey's fieldwork was done, as opposed to the date of publication. If such date is unknown, the date of publication is given instead. The highest percentage figure in each polling survey is displayed in bold, and the background shaded in the candidate's colour. In the instance of a tie, the figures with the highest percentages are shaded. Polls show data gathered among PSOE voters/supporters as well as Spanish voters as a whole, but not among party members, who were the ones ultimately entitled to vote in the primary election.

=== PSOE voters ===
Polling firm/Commissioner	Fieldwork date	Sample size													Other /None	Question	Lead
Polling firm/Commissioner	Fieldwork date	Sample size	Rubalcaba (Inc.)	Madina	Sánchez	Tapias	Sotillos	Chacón	Díaz	López	Page	Gómez	González	Griñán	Other /None	Question	Lead
**Primary election**	13 Jul 2014	—N/a (Note: PSOE members.)	–	36.0	**48.3**	15.0	–	–	–	–	–	–	–	–	0.7	—N/a	12.3
Sigma Dos/El Mundo	8–10 Jul 2014	500	–	**34.8**	31.5	10.6	–	–	–	–	–	–	–	–	–	23.1	3.3
NC Report/La Razón	6 Jul 2014	?	–	**34.0**	21.5	8.3	–	–	–	–	–	–	–	–	24.4	12.2	12.5
Sigma Dos/El Mundo	30 Jun–3 Jul 2014	500	–	27.0	**30.8**	8.3	–	–	–	–	–	–	–	–	–	33.9	3.8
Metroscopia/El País	30 Jun–1 Jul 2014	121	–	**40.0**	27.0	12.0	–	–	–	–	–	–	–	–	–	21.0	13.0
Metroscopia/El País	25–26 Jun 2014	161	–	**35.0**	28.0	9.0	–	–	–	–	–	–	–	–	–	28.0	7.0
Sigma Dos/El Mundo	23–26 Jun 2014	500	–	**35.1**	18.8	6.7	3.7	–	–	–	–	–	–	–	–	35.7	16.3
Sigma Dos/El Mundo	16–19 Jun 2014	500	–	**35.5**	16.7	6.2	4.7	–	–	–	–	–	–	–	–	36.9	18.8
Metroscopia/El País	16–17 Jun 2014	159	–	**43.0**	24.0	6.0	–	–	–	–	–	–	–	–	–	27.0	19.0
GESOP/El Periódico	27–31 May 2014	1,000	–	22.0	4.4	–	–	**31.9**	14.3	16.5	–	–	–	–	2.2	8.8	9.9
NC Report/La Razón	26–31 May 2014	400	–	8.8	3.3	–	–	9.5	**15.3**	4.8	3.8	–	–	–	8.3	46.2	5.8
Sigma Dos/El Mundo	28–30 May 2014	?	–	**26.7**	7.6	–	–	24.8	20.0	–	–	–	–	–	9.5	7.7	1.9
Sigma Dos/El Mundo	26–28 Dec 2013	?	5.3	15.9	–	–	–	**28.7**	16.1	13.0	2.8	–	–	–	1.9	16.4	12.6
TNS Demoscopia	14–21 Nov 2013	?	15.1	18.3	–	–	–	**27.1**	7.3	24.8	0.3	–	–	–	3.2	3.9	2.3
Sigma Dos/El Mundo	12–14 Nov 2013	?	13.8	13.7	–	–	–	**27.2**	15.6	9.2	2.9	–	–	–	3.8	13.9	11.6
GAD3/Antena 3	13 Nov 2013	?	**18.0**	12.0	–	–	–	17.0	4.0	12.0	–	1.0	–	–	36.0		1.0
NC Report/La Razón	10 Nov 2013	?	–	–	–	–	–	**21.5**	15.9	14.1	9.0	–	–	–	9.1	30.4	5.6
Intercampo/GETS (Note: "La izquierda se convierte en la fuerza electoral potencialmente mayoritaria en España" (PDF). Fundación Sistema (in Spanish). 14 October 2013. Archived from the original on 5 November 2013.)	16 Sep–14 Oct 2013	?	**24.5**	5.6	–	–	–	14.2	0.8	3.9	–	–	15.6	–	41.4	7.8	8.9
Feedback/La Vanguardia	2–6 Sep 2013	?	17.3	18.0	–	–	–	**29.0**	–	16.0	–	–	–	–	19.7		11.0
TNS Demoscopia	29–31 Jul 2013	?	14.1	22.0	–	–	–	**24.6**	1.1	21.0	0.2	–	–	–	8.9	8.1	2.6
Sigma Dos/El Mundo	8–10 May 2013	?	11.5	19.4	–	–	–	**25.0**	–	8.9	0.6	2.5	–	4.2	11.7	16.4	5.6
MyWord/Cadena SER	2–8 May 2013	?	12.5	22.4	–	–	–	**22.9**	0.5	7.7	0.9	5.5	–	3.9	5.5	18.2	0.5

=== Spanish voters ===
Polling firm/Commissioner	Fieldwork date	Sample size										Other /None	Question	Lead
Polling firm/Commissioner	Fieldwork date	Sample size	Rubalcaba (Inc.)	Madina	Sánchez	Chacón	Díaz	López	Page	Gómez	Griñán	Other /None	Question	Lead
GESOP/El Periódico	27–31 May 2014	1,000	–	14.3	3.7	19.9	16.6	13.4	–	–	–	14.7	17.4	3.3
Sigma Dos/El Mundo	28–30 May 2014	?	–	19.2	7.3	22.6	12.7	–	–	–	–	23.4	12.8	3.4
InvyMark/laSexta	26–30 May 2014	?	–	13.9	5.3	22.5	15.9	8.9	–	–	–	33.5		6.6
Sigma Dos/El Mundo	26–28 Dec 2013	?	4.9	11.6	–	23.2	13.2	12.3	2.3	–	–	4.4	28.0	10.0
TNS Demoscopia	14–21 Nov 2013	?	7.5	8.1	–	22.1	7.0	12.2	1.3	–	–	17.8	24.0	9.9
Sigma Dos/El Mundo	12–14 Nov 2013	?	8.5	8.4	–	24.4	11.0	11.1	2.6	–	–	7.0	26.9	13.3
GAD3/Antena 3	13 Nov 2013	?	9.0	–	–	13.0	–	–	–	–	–	78.0		4.0
Feedback/La Vanguardia	2–6 Sep 2013	1,500	17.5	17.4	–	23.8	–	16.8	–	–	–	24.5		6.3
TNS Demoscopia	29–31 Jul 2013	?	6.2	10.5	–	16.9	0.9	7.6	0.8	–	–	22.0	35.1	6.4
Sigma Dos/El Mundo	8–10 May 2013	?	7.2	13.3	–	20.2	–	10.6	2.0	2.7	2.9	10.8	30.3	6.9
MyWord/Cadena SER	2–8 May 2013	?	8.7	10.7	–	17.9	0.4	7.4	0.7	4.0	1.6	5.9	42.7	7.2

== Results ==
=== Primary ===
==== Overall ====
Summary of the 13 July 2014 PSOE primary results
Candidate	Votes	%
Pedro Sánchez	64,116	48.32
Eduardo Madina	47,750	35.98
José Antonio Pérez Tapias	19,869	14.97
Blank ballots	967	0.73
Total	132,702	
Valid votes	132,702	99.89
Invalid votes	148	0.11
Votes cast / turnout	132,850	67.05
Abstentions	65,273	32.95
Total members	198,123	

Vote by party members
Sánchez	48.32%
Madina	35.98%
Tapias	14.97%
Blank ballots	0.73%

==== By region ====
Region	Electorate	Turnout	Pedro Sánchez		Eduardo Madina		José Antonio Pérez Tapias	
Region	Electorate	Turnout	Votes	%	Votes	%	Votes	%
Andalusia	48,858	70.24	20,843	61.20	7,846	23.04	5,366	15.76
Aragon	9,020	69.43	3,507	56.46	1,905	30.67	800	12.88
Asturias	8,589	65.08	1,868	33.76	2,579	46.61	1,086	19.63
Balearic Islands	2,734	66.61	796	44.25	763	42.41	240	13.34
Basque Country	5,103	68.82	1,748	50.19	1,205	34.60	530	15.22
Canary Islands	6,507	69.13	2,386	53.59	1,441	32.37	625	14.04
Cantabria	3,251	71.09	910	39.72	1,051	45.88	330	14.40
Castile and León	10,418	72.05	2,912	39.13	3,437	46.19	1,092	14.68
Castilla–La Mancha	12,479	74.68	4,316	46.62	3,816	41.22	1,125	12.15
Catalonia	20,658	47.87	3,648	37.37	3,946	40.42	2,168	22.21
Ceuta	189	58.20	35	32.41	49	45.37	24	22.22
Extremadura	10,003	75.49	2,885	38.43	3,829	51.01	793	10.56
Galicia	11,550	69.06	3,946	50.01	3,059	38.77	886	11.23
La Rioja	1,263	76.56	443	46.19	345	35.97	171	17.83
Madrid	15,883	65.07	4,359	42.66	3,973	38.88	1,886	18.46
Melilla	285	63.16	91	51.12	66	37.08	21	11.80
Murcia	6,155	72.04	2,048	46.44	1,780	40.36	582	13.20
Navarre	1,673	73.64	485	39.62	582	47.55	157	12.83
Valencian Community	18,351	77.44	6,420	45.42	5,811	41.11	1,903	13.46
Europe	872	19.95	36	21.18	90	52.94	44	25.88
Americas	4,282	15.25	434	66.67	117	27.19	40	6.14
Total	198,123	67.05	64,116	48.67	47,750	36.25	19,869	15.08

=== Congress ===
Summary of the 27 July 2014 PSOE congress results
Candidate	SG		Executive	
Candidate	Votes	%	Votes	%
Pedro Sánchez	Unopposed		849	86.19
Blank ballots	—N/a		136	13.81
Total	—N/a		985	
Valid votes	—N/a		985	99.49
Invalid votes	—N/a		5	0.51
Votes cast / turnout	—N/a		990	97.15
Not voting	—N/a		29	2.85
Total delegates	1,019		1,019	

Vote by delegates (Executive Commission)
Sánchez	86.19%
Blank ballots	13.81%

== Aftermath ==
In his victory speech after being elected as secretary-general by party members, Pedro Sánchez proclaimed "the beginning of a new time in the Spanish Socialist Workers' Party" and that it was "the beginning of the end of Mariano Rajoy as prime minister". He was formally named to the post on 26 July succeeding Rubalcaba, who announced his intention to quit from active politics and to return to his post professor in the organic chemistry faculty, in the Complutense University of Madrid.

Upon his official proclamation as Secretary-General, Sánchez stated that "We [the PSOE] are the party of change, we are the left that will change Spain", urging all Socialists to "work for the millions of people that need a renewed PSOE" and to make the party "the most formidable instrument for making the country progress". Sánchez promised to be blunt with corruption cases within the party, to look forward the promotion of a federal amendment of the Spanish Constitution and that his executive will report in an open assembly to the militants once per year. Sánchez stated that he was inspired by the "modernization drives" of both Felipe González in the past as well as of Italian Democratic Party leader Matteo Renzi.
