= José Antonio Pérez Tapias =

Spanish politician

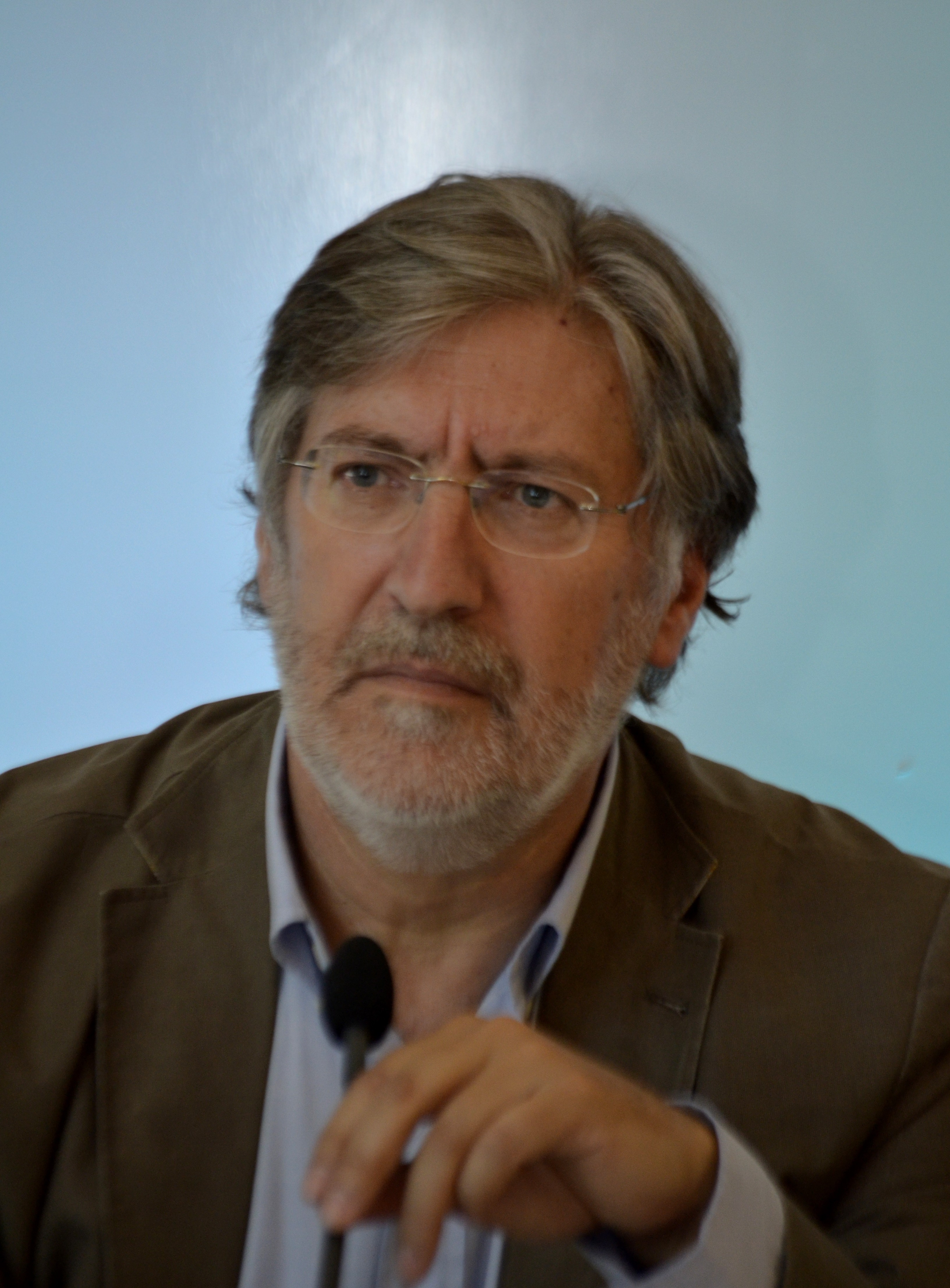

Member of the Congress of Deputies
- In office 12 December 2006 – 27 September 2011
- Constituency: Granada

Personal details
- Born: 3 June 1955 (age 70) Seville, Spain
- Party: Spanish Socialist Workers' Party (1993–2018)
- Occupation: University professor, politician, political philosopher, columnist, essayist

José Antonio Pérez Tapias (born 1955) is a Spanish politician, author and university professor. He was a member of the 8th and 9th terms of the Congress of Deputies.

== Biography ==
Born on 3 June 1955 in Seville, he has however been based most of his life in Granada, earning a licentiate degree in Theology in 1978, a licentiate degree in Philosophy and Arts in 1981 and a PhD in Philosophy at the University of Granada (UGR), reading a dissertation titled El pensamiento humanista de Erich Fromm. Crítica y utopía desde Marx y Freud in 1990. He is full professor of Philosophy of the UGR.

He became a member of the Spanish Socialist Workers' Party (PSOE) in 1993.

He ran 5th in the PSOE list for the constituency of Granada vis-à-vis the March 2004 election to the Congress of Deputies. He was not elected then, but he became a member of the 8th term of the Lower House in 2006, covering the vacant seat left by Rafael Estrella Pedrola. He renovated his seat in the 2008 election, having run 4th in the PSOE list in Granada. From 2007 to 2011 he was also member of the Spanish delegation to the Organization for Security and Co-operation in Europe (OSCE).

He was one of the members (along Manuel de la Rocha Rubí and Juan Antonio Barrio de Penagos) of the Socialist Parliamentary Group in the Congress who decided not to take part in the September 2011 voting for the reform of the Spanish Constitution struck by the PSOE and the People's Party that sought to include (and successfully did so) the principle of "budgetary stability" in the Article 135 of the text.

He was elected Dean of the Faculty of Philosophy and Arts of the UGR on 16 October 2013.

A prominent member of Izquierda Socialista ("Socialist Left"), a left-wing faction within the PSOE, he contested the July 2014 PSOE primary election, drawing the support of 15% of the voting affiliates, ending up last after winner Pedro Sánchez Pérez-Castejón (49%) and runner-up Eduardo Madina (36%).

In January 2018 he left the PSOE, putting an end to a 25-year long membership.

A prolific writer for press and specialized journals, he is also the author of several books dealing with political concepts such as "democratic education", "intercultural citizenship" and social democracy. He endorses the idea of a "plurinational federal state" in Spain.

== Electoral history ==
Electoral history of José Antonio Pérez Tapias
Election	List	Constituency	List position	Result
2004 Congress of Deputies election	PSOE	Granada	5th (out of 7)	Not elected (Note: He became MP in 2006, replacing Rafael Estrella Pedrola.)
2008 Congress of Deputies election	PSOE	Granada	4th (out of 7)	Elected

== Works ==
- — (2013). Invitación al federalismo. España y las razones para un Estado plurinacional. Madrid: Trotta.
- — (2017). La insoportable contradicción de una democracia cínica. Granada: Ediciones Universidad de Granada.
