= 2012 PSOE federal party congress =

- 3−5 February 2012

956 delegates in the Federal Congress Plurality of delegates needed to win
- Opinion polls
- Turnout: Secretary-General: 955 (99.9%); Executive: 899 (94.0%)
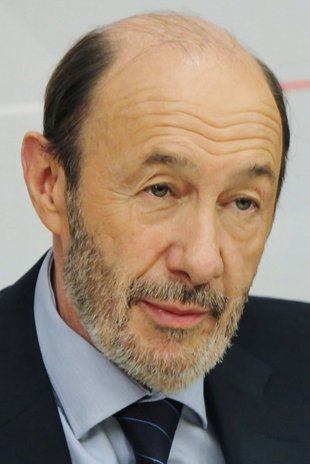

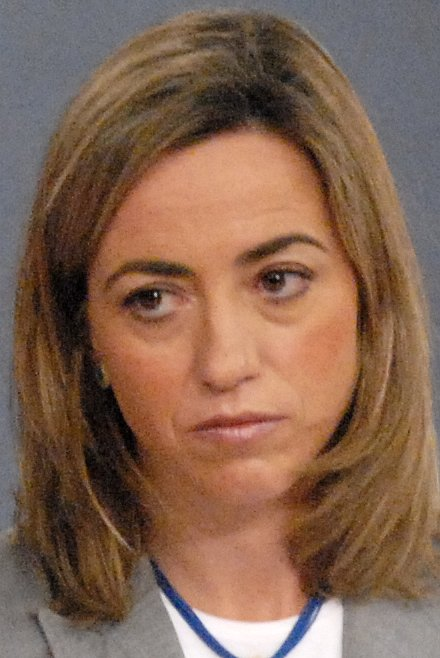

Candidate	Alfredo Pérez Rubalcaba	Carme Chacón	Blank ballots
Delegate vote	487 (51.0%)	465 (48.7%)	2 (0.2%)
Executive	723 (81.1%)	Withdrew	168 (18.9%)
Party leader before election
José Luis Rodríguez Zapatero
Party leader after election
Alfredo Pérez Rubalcaba

The Spanish Socialist Workers' Party (PSOE) held its 38th federal congress in Seville from 3 to 5 February 2012, to renovate its governing bodies—including the post of secretary-general, which amounted to that of party leader—and establish the party platform and policy until the next congress.

The congress was called after the PSOE suffered its worst defeat since the Spanish transition to democracy in the general election held on 20 November 2011. Previous secretary-general José Luis Rodríguez Zapatero had announced in April the same year he would not stand for election to a third term as Prime Minister of Spain, announcing his intention to step down as party leader after a successor had been elected.

The result was a close race between the two candidates to the party leadership: Alfredo Pérez Rubalcaba, the party's candidate for the 2011 general election and former first deputy prime minister and interior minister, and former defence minister Carme Chacón. The ballot saw Rubalcaba win by a 51.0% of the delegate vote (487 votes) to the 48.7% won by Carme Chacón (465 votes), with 2 blank and 1 invalid ballots.

== Timetable ==
The key dates are listed below (all times are CET):

- 26 November: Official announcement of the congress.
- 8 January: Federal committee endorsement submission.
- 9–15 January: Election of congress delegates.
- 3–5 February: Federal congress.

== Candidates ==
Candidate	Notable positions	Announced	Ref.
=== Proclaimed ===
Candidates who met endorsement requirements and were officially proclaimed to contest the party congress.
Alfredo Pérez Rubalcaba (age 60)	Member of the Congress of Deputies for Madrid (1996–2004 and since 2011); Member of the PSOE Executive Commission (since 2008); First Deputy Prime Minister of Spain (2010–2011); Spokesperson of the Government of Spain (1993–1996 and 2010–2011); Member of the Congress of Deputies for Cádiz (2008–2011); Minister of the Interior of Spain (2006–2011); Member of the Congress of Deputies for Cantabria (2004–2008); Spokesperson of the Socialist Parliamentary Group of the Congress (2004–2006); Secretary of Communication of the PSOE (1997–2000); Minister of the Presidency of Spain (1993–1996); Member of the Congress of Deputies for Toledo (1993–1996); Minister of Education and Science of Spain (1992–1993); Secretary of State of Education of Spain (1988–1992); Secretary-General for Education of Spain (1986–1988); Director-General for University Education of Spain (1985–1986)	29 December 2011	
Carme Chacón (age 40)	Member of the PSOE Executive Commission (since 2008); Member of the Congress of Deputies for Barcelona (since 2000); Minister of Defence of Spain (2008–2011); Minister of Housing of Spain (2007–2008); Secretary of Culture of the PSOE (2004–2008); First Vice President of the Congress of Deputies (2004–2007); Secretary of Education, Universities, Culture and Research of the PSOE (2000–2004); First Deputy Mayor of Esplugues de Llobregat (1999–2003); City Councillor of Esplugues de Llobregat (1999–2003)	7 January 2012	
=== Failed to qualify ===
Candidates who announced an intention to run, but failed to qualify due to not meeting endorsement requirements.
Luis Ángel Hierro (age 48)	Member of the Congress of Deputies for Seville (2004–2007)	8 January 2012	

=== Declined ===
The individuals in this section were the subject of speculation about their possible candidacy, but publicly denied or recanted interest in running:

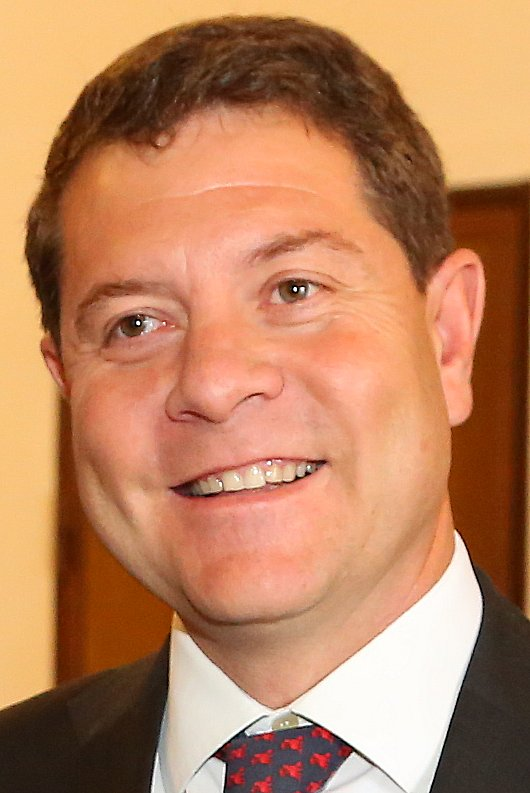
Emiliano García-Page

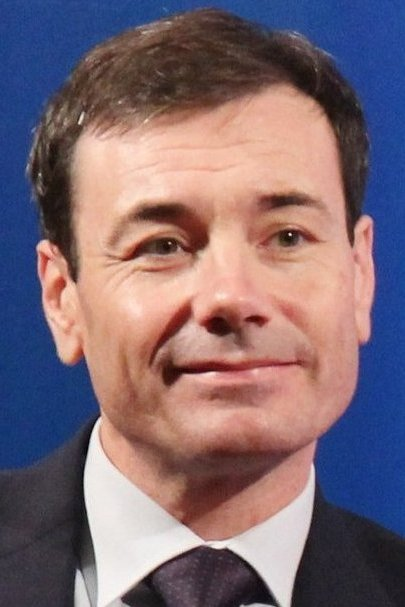
Tomás Gómez

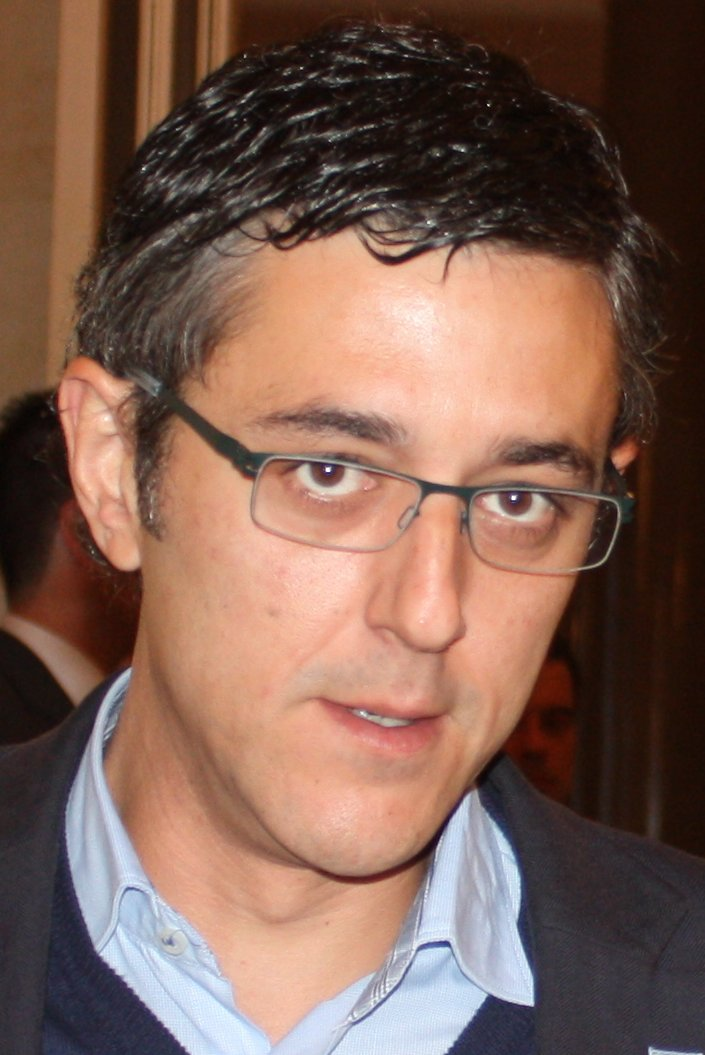
Eduardo Madina

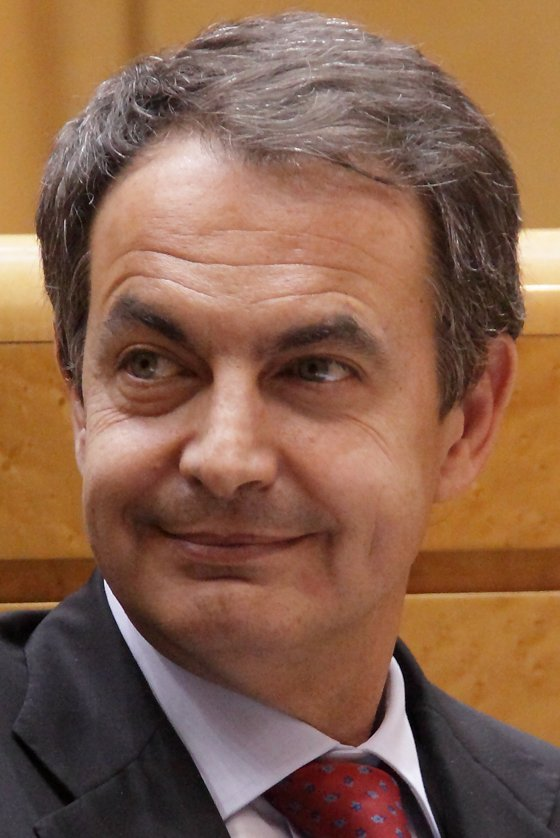
José Luis Rodríguez Zapatero
- Emiliano García-Page (age 43) — Senator appointed by the Cortes of Castilla–La Mancha (since 2011); Mayor of Toledo (since 2007); City Councillor of Toledo (1987–1993 and since 2007); Secretary-General of the PSCM–PSOE in the province of Toledo (since 1997); Second Vice President of the Regional Government of Castilla–La Mancha (2005–2007); Member of the Cortes of Castilla–La Mancha for Toledo (1995–2007); Minister of Institutional Relations of Castilla–La Mancha (2004–2005); Minister-Spokersperson of Castilla–La Mancha (1993–1997, 1998–1999 and 2001–2004); Spokesperson of the Socialist Group in the Cortes of Castilla–La Mancha (2000–2001); Minister of Social Welfare of Castilla–La Mancha (1999–2000); Minister of Public Works of Castilla–La Mancha (1997–1998); Deputy Mayor for Celebrations of Toledo (1991–1993).
- Tomás Gómez (age 43) — Senator appointed by the Assembly of Madrid (since 2011); Spokesperson of the Socialist Group in the Assembly of Madrid (since 2011); Member of the Assembly of Madrid (since 2011); Secretary-General of the PSM–PSOE (since 2007); Mayor of Parla (1999–2008); City Councillor of Parla (1999–2008).
- Eduardo Madina (age 36) — Secretary-General of the Socialist Parliamentary Group in the Congress (since 2009); Member of the PSOE Executive Commission (since 2008); Member of the Congress of Deputies for Biscay (since 2004); City Councillor of Sestao (1999–2001).
- José Luis Rodríguez Zapatero (age 51) — Secretary-General of the PSOE (since 2000); Prime Minister of Spain (2004–2011); Member of the Congress of Deputies for Madrid (2004–2011); President pro tempore of the Council of the European Union (2010); Leader of the Opposition of Spain (2000–2004); Member of the Congress of Deputies for León (1986–2004); Member of the PSOE Executive Commission (1997–2000); Secretary-General of the PSOE in the province of León (1988–2000).

== Endorsements ==
Candidates seeking to run were required to collect the endorsements of at least 10% of federal committee members and of between 20% and 30% of congress delegates.

Summary of candidate endorsement results
Candidate	Federal committee			Delegates		
Candidate	Count	% T	% V	Count	% T	% V
Alfredo Pérez Rubalcaba	58	23.20	66.67	286	29.92	49.91
Carme Chacón	29	11.60	33.33	287	30.02	50.09
Luis Ángel Hierro	Eliminated (below 10%)			—N/a		
Total	87			573		
Valid endorsements	87	34.80		573	59.94	
Not endorsing	163	65.20		383	40.06	
Total members / delegates	250			956		

Endorsements by committee members
Rubalcaba	66.67%
Chacón	33.33%

Endorsements by delegates
Chacón	50.09%
Rubalcaba	49.91%

== Opinion polls ==
Poll results are listed in the tables below in reverse chronological order, showing the most recent first, and using the date the survey's fieldwork was done, as opposed to the date of publication. If such date is unknown, the date of publication is given instead. The highest percentage figure in each polling survey is displayed in bold, and the background shaded in the candidate's colour. In the instance of a tie, the figures with the highest percentages are shaded. Polls show data gathered among PSOE voters/supporters as well as Spanish voters as a whole, but not among delegates, who were the ones ultimately entitled to vote in the congress election.

=== PSOE voters ===
Polling firm/Commissioner	Fieldwork date	Sample size						Other /None	Question	Lead
Polling firm/Commissioner	Fieldwork date	Sample size	Chacón	Rubalcaba	Bono	L. Aguilar	Madina	Other /None	Question	Lead
**Congress election**	4 Feb 2012	—N/a (Note: PSOE delegates.)	48.7	**51.0**	–	–	–	0.2	—N/a	2.3
Metroscopia/El País	4–5 Jan 2012	?	21.0	**44.0**	–	–	–	22.0	13.0	23.0
Sigma Dos/El Mundo	27–29 Dec 2011	?	38.2	**50.4**	–	–	–	–	11.4	12.2
Sigma Dos/El Mundo	27–29 Dec 2011	?	33.7	**35.3**	11.0	4.9	3.4	3.3	8.4	1.6
Sigma Dos/El Mundo	27 Nov 2011	?	27.4	**43.1**	8.1	–	–	21.4		15.7

=== Spanish voters ===
Polling firm/Commissioner	Fieldwork date	Sample size							Other /None	Question	Lead
Polling firm/Commissioner	Fieldwork date	Sample size	Chacón	Rubalcaba	Bono	L. Aguilar	Madina	López	Other /None	Question	Lead
Metroscopia/El País	4–5 Jan 2012	1,000	18.0	**26.0**	–	–	–	–	36.0	20.0	8.0
Sigma Dos/El Mundo	27–29 Dec 2011	800	37.2	**38.5**	–	–	–	–	–	24.3	1.3
Sigma Dos/El Mundo	27–29 Dec 2011	800	22.4	**26.0**	14.4	4.1	3.2	–	3.9	26.0	3.6
Sigma Dos/El Mundo	27 Nov 2011	?	19.5	**21.2**	15.8	2.0	2.4	2.5	36.6		1.7

== Delegate estimations ==
Source	Fieldwork date	Sample size	Delegates			Percentage		
Source	Fieldwork date	Sample size			Other /None /Unknown			Other /None /Unknown
Source	Fieldwork date	Sample size	Chacón	Rubalcaba	Other /None /Unknown	Chacón	Rubalcaba	Other /None /Unknown
Congress election	4 Feb 2012	956	465	487	4	48.6	50.9	0.4
Chacón's campaign	3 Feb 2012	924 (Note: Does not include delegates from Europe, the Americas and the JSE.)	501	421	2	54.2	45.6	0.2
Rubacaba's campaign	3 Feb 2012	924	413	506	5	44.7	54.8	0.5
Chacón's campaign	23 Jan 2012	956	488	360	108	51.0	37.7	11.3
Rubacaba's campaign	23 Jan 2012	956	390	540	26	40.8	56.5	2.7
Chacón's campaign	20 Jan 2012	786 (Note: Partial count.)	416	290	80	52.9	36.9	10.2
Rubacaba's campaign	20 Jan 2012	698	290	380	28	41.5	54.4	4.0

== Results ==
Summary of the 4–5 February 2012 congress results
Candidate	SG		Executive	
Candidate	Votes	%	Votes	%
Alfredo Pérez Rubalcaba	487	51.05	723	81.14
Carme Chacón	465	48.74	Withdrawn	
Blank ballots	2	0.21	168	18.86
Total	954		891	
Valid votes	954	99.90	891	99.11
Invalid votes	1	0.10	8	0.89
Votes cast / turnout	955	99.90	899	94.04
Not voting	1	0.10	57	5.96
Total delegates	956		956	

Vote by delegates (Secretary-General)
Rubalcaba	51.05%
Chacón	48.74%
Blank ballots	0.21%

Vote by delegates (Executive Commission)
Rubalcaba	81.14%
Blank ballots	18.86%

== Bibliography ==
- Pascual Bueno, Ernesto M. (2016). Selección de Líderes y Candidatos a la Presidencia del Gobierno (1976-2016). "El jardín secreto del PSOE" (PDF) (PhD) (in Spanish). Barcelona: Universidad Autónoma de Barcelona.
