= Eduardo Madina =

Spanish politician

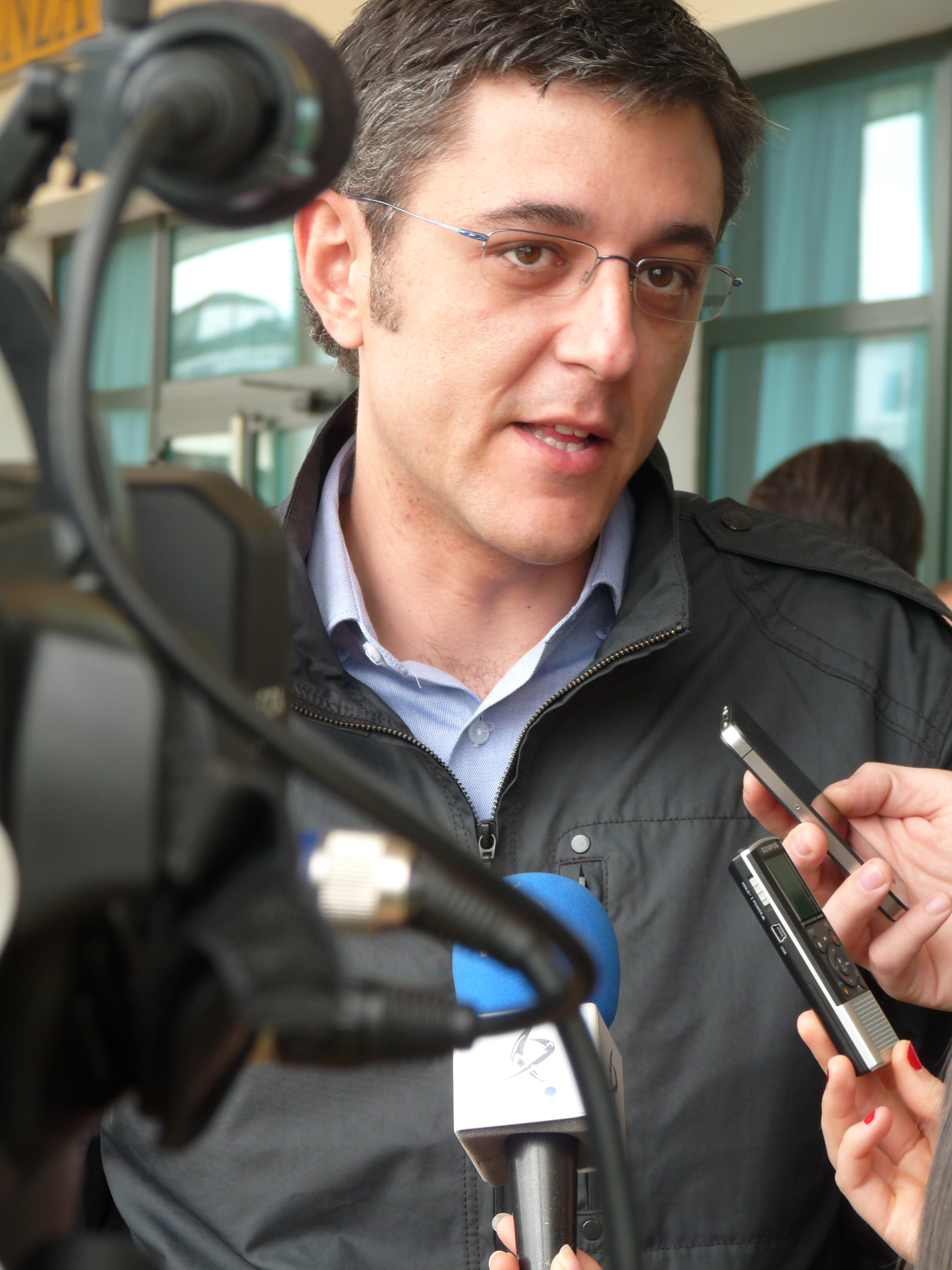

Secretary General of the Socialist Group in the Congress
- Preceded by: Ramón Jáuregui
- Succeeded by: Miguel Ángel Heredia

Member of Parliament for Madrid

Member of Parliament for Biscay

Personal details
- Born: 11 January 1976 (age 50)
- Education: University of Deusto

Eduardo Madina Muñoz (born 11 January 1976) is a Spanish socialist politician. He was the Secretary General of the Socialist Parliamentary Group in Congress between April 2009 and September 2014.

== Biography ==
Madina is married and has one child. He comes from a family of socialists from the Basque Country. His grandfather was a miner. At age 17 he joined the Socialist Youth of Euskadi, a youth branch of the PSE-EE, and shortly after graduating in Contemporary History at the University of Deusto. He holds a master's degree in European Integration from the University of the Basque Country, specialising in International Relations. He has worked as a specialist in the European Parliament and has taught international relations and European construction at several Spanish universities. He is currently associate professor of contemporary history in Madrid at Carlos III University. He previously directed and presented a program of musical content on Radio 3 called "El Archiduc".

In 2012 he was chosen among the most outstanding young people in the world by the Forum of Davos (World Economic Forum) within the YGL programme (Young Global Leaders).

=== Terrorist attack ===
Madina was the victim of a terrorist attack when he was driving, without an escort, from his home to his job in Sestao, on 19 February 2002. A bomb placed on the underside of his car by a unit of the separatist group ETA, composed of Iker Olabarrieta and Asier Arzalluz, caused him serious injuries, including amputation of the left leg at the height of his knee. As a consequence of the injuries suffered he had to leave his volleyball team, the UPV Bizkaia, where he played professionally.

Two years later he received the Constitutional Merit Medal along with other victims of terrorism.

The trial against the alleged perpetrators of the attack in the Supreme Court of Spain began on 12 November 2006. Iker Olabarrieta and Asier Arzalluz, members of ETA, were sentenced to 20 years in prison. The first was condemned as the material author of the assassination attempt, and the second as the instigator.

=== Member of parliament ===
Madina has been a member of Congress since 2004 when he was elected MP for Biscay. Previously, he was Secretary of Institutional Politics of the Socialist Youth of Euskadi until he became the Secretary General of the organisation between 2002 and 2005. He is currently a member of the board of the PSE-EE, and between 2008 and 2014 he was also a member of the PSOE's Federal Executive Committee.

During his term of office, he participated in Julio Medem's documentary The Basque Ball: Skin Against Stone, and always defended the need for a dialogue with ETA to end the violence. In the 2008 general election, he headed the list in Biscay province and was elected. In April 2009 he was appointed Secretary General of the Socialist Parliamentary Group.

=== Primary elections ===
After the defeat of the party in the 2014 European parliament elections, the Secretary General of the PSOE, Alfredo Perez Rubalcaba, resigned and convoked a congress to choose the new leader of the party. Madina, who was one of the first members of the party that called for primary elections with the direct vote of the members, announced his candidacy on 14 June.

He ran a campaign based on two pillars: the fight against corruption and nepotism, and the recovery of social policies. Finally, on 13 July, those internal elections were held in which he achieved the second place with 36% of the votes, in comparison to the 48% of Pedro Sánchez and the 15% of José Antonio Perez Tapias. After the elections, he decided not to take part in Sanchez's new Executive Committee, and to return as a professor to his duties at the university.

== Positions held ==
- City councillor of Sestao (1999-2001)
- Secretary General of the Socialist Youth of the Basque Country (2002-2004).
- Member of Parliament for Vizcaya (2004-2015)
- Secretary General of the Socialist Group in the Congress of Deputies (2009-2014).
- Member of Parliament for Madrid (2016)
