= Biscay (Congress of Deputies constituency) =

Electoral constituency in Spain

Coordinates: 43°15′N 2°59′W

- Congress of Deputies; Electoral constituency
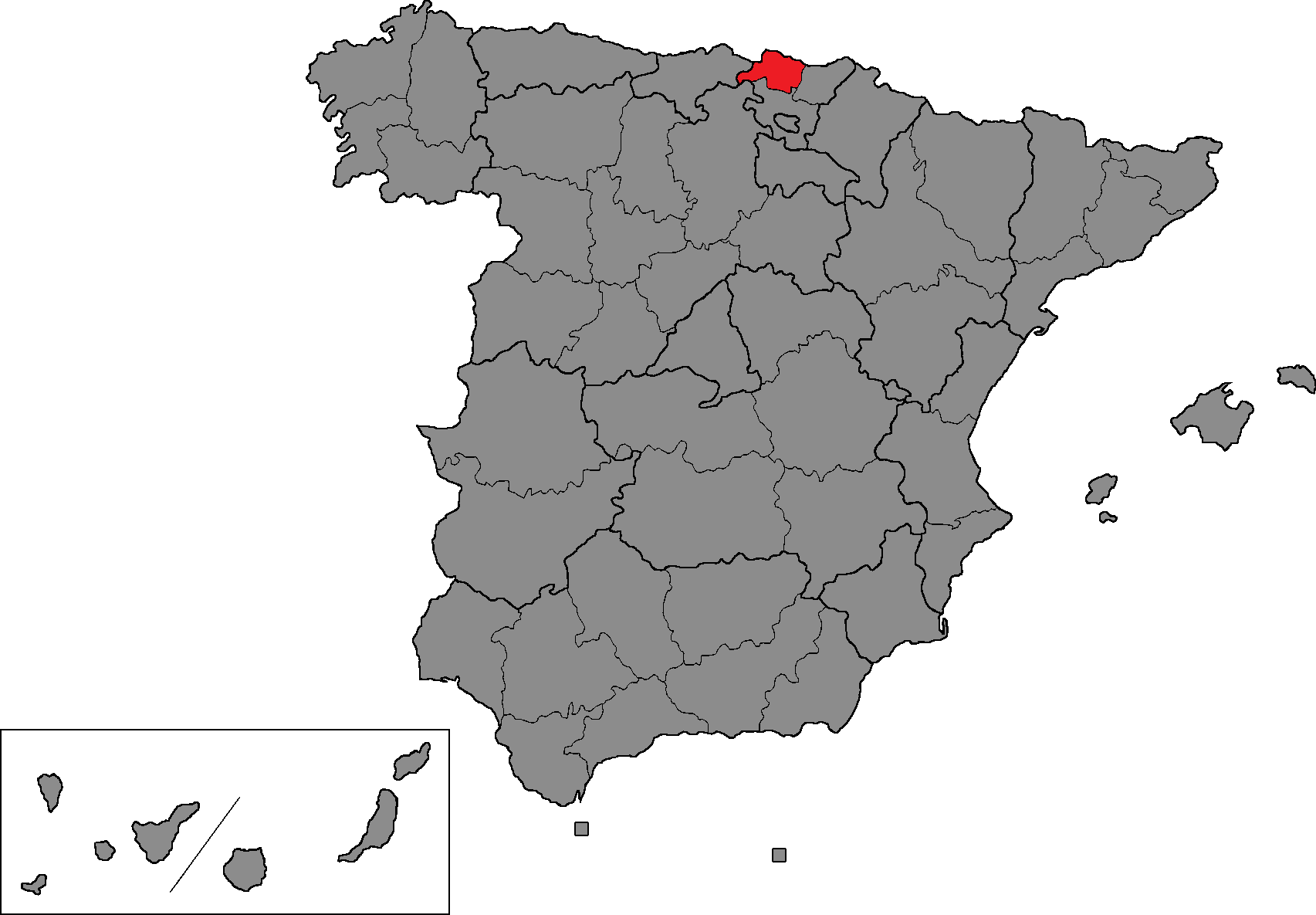
- Location of Biscay within Spain
- Province: Biscay
- Autonomous community: Basque Country
- Population: ▲1,160,133 (2024)
- Electorate: ▼942,983 (2023)
- Major settlements: Bilbao, Barakaldo, Getxo

Current constituency
- Created: 1977
- Seats: 10 (1977–1993); 9 (1993–2008); 8 (2008–present)
- Members: PNV (2); PSOE (2); EH Bildu (2); PP (1); Sumar (1)

Biscay (Basque: Bizkaia, Spanish: Vizcaya) is one of the 52 constituencies represented in the Congress of Deputies, the lower chamber of the Spanish parliament, the Cortes Generales. The constituency (whose boundaries correspond to those of the homonymous province) currently elects eight deputies. The electoral system uses the D'Hondt method and closed-list proportional voting, with a minimum threshold of three percent.

== Electoral system ==
The constituency was created as per the Political Reform Law and was first contested in the 1977 general election. The Law provided for the provinces of Spain to be established as multi-member districts in the Congress of Deputies, with this regulation being maintained under the Spanish Constitution of 1978. Additionally, the Constitution requires for any modification of the provincial limits to be approved under an organic law, needing an absolute majority in the Cortes Generales.

Voting is based on universal suffrage, comprising all Spanish nationals over 18 years of age with full political rights, provided that they have not been deprived of the right to vote by a final sentence. The only exception was in 1977, when this was limited to nationals over 21 years of age and in full enjoyment of their political and civil rights. Amendments in 2011 required non-resident citizens to apply for voting, a system known as "begged" voting (Spanish: Voto rogado). which was abolished in 2022. Further, amendments in 2018 granted the right to vote to those legally incapacitated. The Congress of Deputies has a minimum of 300 and a maximum of 400 seats, with electoral provisions fixing its size at 350. Of these, 348 are elected in 50 multi-member constituencies corresponding to the provinces of Spain—each of which is assigned an initial minimum of two seats and the remaining 248 distributed in proportion to population—using the D'Hondt method and closed-list proportional voting, with a three percent-threshold of valid votes (including blank ballots) in each constituency. The remaining two seats are allocated to Ceuta and Melilla as single-member districts elected by plurality voting. The use of this electoral method may result in a higher effective threshold depending on district magnitude and vote distribution. The law does not provide for by-elections to fill vacant seats; instead, any vacancies arising after the proclamation of candidates and during the legislative term are filled by the next candidates on the party lists or, when required, by designated substitutes.

The electoral law allows for parties and federations registered in the interior ministry, alliances and groupings of electors to present lists of candidates. Parties and federations intending to form an alliance are required to inform the relevant electoral commission within 10 days of the election call—15 before 1985—whereas groupings of electors need to secure the signature of at least one percent of the electorate in the constituencies for which they seek election—one permille of the electorate, with a compulsory minimum of 500 signatures, until 1985—disallowing electors from signing for more than one list. Also since 2011, parties, federations or alliances that have not obtained a mandate in either chamber of the Cortes at the preceding election are required to secure the signature of at least 0.1 percent of electors in the aforementioned constituencies. Amendments in 2007 required a balanced composition of men and women in the electoral lists, so that candidates of either sex made up at least 40 percent of the total composition; further amendments in 2024 required the use of a zipper system.

== Deputies ==
Deputies 1977–present
Key to parties HB Amaiur EH Bildu (Note: From 2023.) EH Bildu (Note: Until 2023.) IU U.Podemos Podemos Sumar EE PSOE EA PNV UCD PP CP AP
Legislature	Election	Distribution
Constituent	1977	3 / 4 / 2 / 1
1st	1979	2 / 2 / 4 / 2
2nd	1982	1 / 4 / 4 / 1
3rd	1986	2 / 1 / 3 / 3 / 1
4th	1989	2 / 1 / 2 / 1 / 3 / 1
5th	1993	1 / 3 / 3 / 2
6th	1996	1 / 1 / 2 / 3 / 2
7th	2000	2 / 4 / 3
8th	2004	3 / 4 / 2
9th	2008	4 / 3 / 1
10th	2011	2 / 2 / 3 / 1
11th	2015	1 / 2 / 1 / 3 / 1
12th	2016	1 / 3 / 1 / 2 / 1
13th	2019 (Apr)	1 / 2 / 2 / 3
14th	2019 (Nov)	1 / 1 / 2 / 3 / 1
15th	2023	2 / 1 / 2 / 2 / 1

== General elections ==
=== 2026 ===
Summary of the 29 November 2026 Congress of Deputies election results in Biscay
Parties and alliances	Popular vote			Seats	
Parties and alliances	Votes	%	±pp	Total	+/−
Basque Nationalist Party (EAJ/PNV)					
Socialist Party of the Basque Country–Basque Country Left (PSE–EE (PSOE))					
Basque Country Gather (EH Bildu)					
People's Party (PP)					
Broad Front (FA)^{1}			n/a		
We Can (Podemos)^{1}			n/a		
Vox (Vox)					
Animalist Party with the Environment (PACMA)					
Workers' Front (FO)					
For a Fairer World (M+J)					
Communist Party of the Workers of the Basque Country (PCTE/ELAK)					
Blank ballots					
Total				8	±0
Valid votes					
Invalid votes					
Votes cast / turnout					
Abstentions					
Registered voters	959,702				
Sources
Footnotes: ^{1} Within the Unite alliance in the 2023 election.

=== 2023 ===
Summary of the 23 July 2023 Congress of Deputies election results in Biscay
Parties and alliances	Popular vote			Seats	
Parties and alliances	Votes	%	±pp	Total	+/−
Basque Nationalist Party (EAJ/PNV)	164,188	26.93	–8.29	2	–1
Socialist Party of the Basque Country–Basque Country Left (PSE–EE (PSOE))	157,448	25.82	+6.69	2	±0
Basque Country Gather (EH Bildu)	125,867	20.64	+5.62	2	+1
People's Party (PP)	70,533	11.57	+2.75	1	±0
Unite (Sumar)^{1}	66,592	10.92	–5.85	1	±0
Vox (Vox)	16,069	2.64	+0.22	0	±0
Animalist Party with the Environment (PACMA)^{2}	2,729	0.45	–0.15	0	±0
Workers' Front (FO)	929	0.15	New	0	±0
For a Fairer World (PUM+J)	804	0.13	+0.05	0	±0
Communist Party of the Workers of the Basque Country (PCTE/ELAK)	618	0.10	+0.02	0	±0
Zero Cuts (Recortes Cero)	525	0.09	–0.03	0	±0
Blank ballots	3,391	0.56	–0.04		
Total	609,693			8	±0
Valid votes	609,693	99.15	–0.27		
Invalid votes	5,251	0.85	+0.27		
Votes cast / turnout	614,944	65.21	–1.55		
Abstentions	328,039	34.79	+1.55		
Registered voters	942,983				
Sources
Footnotes: ^{1} Unite results are compared to the combined totals of United We Can and More Country–Ecologist Candidacy in the November 2019 election.; ^{2} Animalist Party with the Environment results are compared to Animalist Party Against Mistreatment of Animals totals in the November 2019 election.

=== November 2019 ===
Summary of the 10 November 2019 Congress of Deputies election results in Biscay
Parties and alliances	Popular vote			Seats	
Parties and alliances	Votes	%	±pp	Total	+/−
Basque Nationalist Party (EAJ/PNV)	221,979	35.22	+0.88	3	±0
Socialist Party of the Basque Country–Basque Country Left (PSE–EE (PSOE))	120,566	19.13	–0.75	2	±0
United We Can (Podemos–IU)	97,125	15.41	–2.31	1	–1
Basque Country Gather (EH Bildu)	94,669	15.02	+1.66	1	±0
People's Party (PP)	55,621	8.82	+1.56	1	+1
Vox (Vox)	15,284	2.42	+0.11	0	±0
More Country–Ecologist Candidacy (Más País–Candidatura Ecologista)	8,542	1.36	New	0	±0
Citizens–Party of the Citizenry (Cs)	6,929	1.10	–2.01	0	±0
Animalist Party Against Mistreatment of Animals (PACMA)	3,783	0.60	–0.30	0	±0
Zero Cuts–Green Group (Recortes Cero–GV)	753	0.12	–0.05	0	±0
For a Fairer World (PUM+J)	494	0.08	–0.04	0	±0
Communist Party of the Workers of the Basque Country (PCTE/ELAK)	491	0.08	–0.01	0	±0
European Solidarity Action Party (Solidaria)	270	0.04	–0.04	0	±0
Blank ballots	3,806	0.60	–0.06		
Total	630,312			8	±0
Valid votes	630,312	99.42	+0.11		
Invalid votes	3,665	0.58	–0.11		
Votes cast / turnout	633,977	66.76	–6.09		
Abstentions	315,621	33.24	+6.09		
Registered voters	949,598				

=== April 2019 ===
Summary of the 28 April 2019 Congress of Deputies election results in Biscay
Parties and alliances	Popular vote			Seats	
Parties and alliances	Votes	%	±pp	Total	+/−
Basque Nationalist Party (EAJ/PNV)	235,916	34.34	+6.12	3	+1
Socialist Party of the Basque Country–Basque Country Left (PSE–EE (PSOE))	136,547	19.88	+5.97	2	+1
United We Can (Podemos–IU–Equo Berdeak)	121,740	17.72	–11.15	2	–1
Basque Country Gather (EH Bildu)	91,771	13.36	+2.47	1	±0
People's Party (PP)	49,859	7.26	–5.45	0	–1
Citizens–Party of the Citizenry (Cs)	21,392	3.11	–0.22	0	±0
Vox (Vox)	15,839	2.31	+2.21	0	±0
Animalist Party Against Mistreatment of Animals (PACMA)	6,187	0.90	+0.12	0	±0
Zero Cuts–Green Group (Recortes Cero–GV)	1,177	0.17	–0.02	0	±0
For a Fairer World (PUM+J)	844	0.12	New	0	±0
Communist Party of the Workers of the Basque Country (PCTE/ELAK)	603	0.09	New	0	±0
European Solidarity Action Party (Solidaria)	528	0.08	New	0	±0
Blank ballots	4,557	0.66	+0.03		
Total	686,960			8	±0
Valid votes	686,960	99.31	–0.01		
Invalid votes	4,742	0.69	+0.01		
Votes cast / turnout	691,702	72.85	+6.88		
Abstentions	257,740	27.15	–6.88		
Registered voters	949,442				

=== 2016 ===
Summary of the 26 June 2016 Congress of Deputies election results in Biscay
Parties and alliances	Popular vote			Seats	
Parties and alliances	Votes	%	±pp	Total	+/−
United We Can (Podemos/Ahal Dugu–IU–Equo)^{1}	179,347	28.87	–0.05	3	+1
Basque Nationalist Party (EAJ/PNV)	175,296	28.22	+0.31	2	–1
Socialist Party of the Basque Country–Basque Country Left (PSE–EE (PSOE))	86,425	13.91	+0.93	1	±0
People's Party (PP)	78,965	12.71	+1.31	1	±0
Basque Country Gather (EH Bildu)	67,653	10.89	–1.60	1	±0
Citizens–Party of the Citizenry (C's)	20,685	3.33	–0.51	0	±0
Animalist Party Against Mistreatment of Animals (PACMA)	4,865	0.78	+0.12	0	±0
Zero Cuts–Green Group (Recortes Cero–GV)	1,176	0.19	+0.02	0	±0
Blank Seats (EB/AZ)	1,026	0.17	+0.01	0	±0
Union, Progress and Democracy (UPyD)	766	0.12	–0.19	0	±0
Vox (Vox)	641	0.10	New	0	±0
Communist Party of the Peoples of Spain (PCPE)	467	0.08	+0.02	0	±0
Blank ballots	3,907	0.63	–0.11		
Total	621,219			8	±0
Valid votes	621,219	98.32	+0.03		
Invalid votes	4,225	0.68	–0.03		
Votes cast / turnout	625,444	65.97	–3.44		
Abstentions	322,636	34.03	+3.44		
Registered voters	948,080				
Sources
Footnotes: ^{1} United We Can results are compared to the combined totals of We Can and United Left–Popular Unity in Common in the 2015 election.

=== 2015 ===
Summary of the 20 December 2015 Congress of Deputies election results in Biscay
Parties and alliances	Popular vote			Seats	
Parties and alliances	Votes	%	±pp	Total	+/−
Basque Nationalist Party (EAJ/PNV)	182,604	27.91	–4.70	3	±0
We Can (Podemos/Ahal Dugu)	170,728	26.10	New	2	+2
Socialist Party of the Basque Country–Basque Country Left (PSE–EE (PSOE))	84,893	12.98	–8.41	1	–1
Basque Country Gather (EH Bildu)^{1}	81,704	12.49	–6.70	1	–1
People's Party (PP)	74,560	11.40	–6.32	1	±0
Citizens–Party of the Citizenry (C's)	25,148	3.84	New	0	±0
United Left–Popular Unity in Common (IU–UPeC)	18,466	2.82	–0.96	0	±0
Animalist Party Against Mistreatment of Animals (PACMA)	4,342	0.66	+0.15	0	±0
Union, Progress and Democracy (UPyD)	2,012	0.31	–1.39	0	±0
Left–For the Left (Ezkerra)	1,447	0.22	New	0	±0
Zero Cuts–Green Group (Recortes Cero–GV)	1,089	0.17	New	0	±0
Blank Seats (EB/AZ)	1,045	0.16	–0.29	0	±0
For a Fairer World (PUM+J)	479	0.07	–0.19	0	±0
Communist Party of the Peoples of Spain (PCPE)	414	0.06	New	0	±0
Social Justice, Citizen Participation (JS,PC)	406	0.06	New	0	±0
Blank ballots	4,840	0.74	–0.40		
Total	654,177			8	±0
Valid votes	654,177	99.29	+0.30		
Invalid votes	4,647	0.71	–0.30		
Votes cast / turnout	658,824	69.41	+1.33		
Abstentions	290,353	30.59	–1.33		
Registered voters	949,177				
Sources
Footnotes: ^{1} Basque Country Gather results are compared to Amaiur totals in the 2011 election.

=== 2011 ===
Summary of the 20 November 2011 Congress of Deputies election results in Biscay
Parties and alliances	Popular vote			Seats	
Parties and alliances	Votes	%	±pp	Total	+/−
Basque Nationalist Party (EAJ/PNV)	208,683	32.61	+1.51	3	±0
Socialist Party of the Basque Country–Basque Country Left (PSE–EE (PSOE))	136,853	21.39	–15.60	2	–2
Amaiur (Amaiur)^{1}	122,796	19.19	+14.54	2	+2
People's Party (PP)	113,401	17.72	–0.68	1	±0
United Left–The Greens: Plural Left (IU–LV)	24,205	3.78	–0.57	0	±0
Union, Progress and Democracy (UPyD)	10,886	1.70	+0.75	0	±0
Equo (Equo)	7,387	1.15	New	0	±0
Animalist Party Against Mistreatment of Animals (PACMA)	3,278	0.51	+0.14	0	±0
Blank Seats (EB)	2,886	0.45	New	0	±0
For a Fairer World (PUM+J)	1,670	0.26	+0.03	0	±0
Communist Unification of Spain (UCE)	550	0.09	New	0	±0
Blank ballots	7,285	1.14	–0.54		
Total	639,880			8	±0
Valid votes	639,880	98.99	–0.04		
Invalid votes	6,552	1.01	+0.04		
Votes cast / turnout	646,432	68.08	+1.49		
Abstentions	303,039	31.92	–1.49		
Registered voters	949,471				
Sources
Footnotes: ^{1} Amaiur results are compared to the combined totals of Basque Solidarity and Aralar in the 2008 election.

=== 2008 ===
Summary of the 9 March 2008 Congress of Deputies election results in Biscay
Parties and alliances	Popular vote			Seats	
Parties and alliances	Votes	%	±pp	Total	+/−
Socialist Party of the Basque Country–Basque Country Left (PSE–EE (PSOE))	233,371	36.99	+10.23	4	+1
Basque Nationalist Party (EAJ/PNV)	196,242	31.10	–6.19	3	–1
People's Party (PP)	116,110	18.40	–0.34	1	–1
United Left–Greens–Alternative (EB–B)	27,471	4.35	–4.23	0	±0
Basque Solidarity (EA)	19,605	3.11	–1.23	0	±0
Aralar (Aralar)	9,740	1.54	–0.31	0	±0
Union, Progress and Democracy (UPyD)	5,997	0.95	New	0	±0
The Greens (B/LV)	3,351	0.53	New	0	±0
Anti-Bullfighting Party Against Mistreatment of Animals (PACMA)	2,343	0.37	New	0	±0
For a Fairer World (PUM+J)	1,466	0.23	New	0	±0
Internationalist Socialist Workers' Party (POSI)	998	0.16	–0.08	0	±0
Communist Party of the Peoples of Spain–Basque Communists (PCPE–EK)	799	0.13	New	0	±0
Engine and Sports Alternative (AMD)	617	0.10	New	0	±0
Family and Life Party (PFyV)	589	0.09	New	0	±0
Humanist Party (PH)	435	0.07	–0.20	0	±0
Citizens–Party of the Citizenry (C's)	426	0.07	New	0	±0
Spanish Phalanx of the CNSO (FE de las JONS)	219	0.03	+0.01	0	±0
National Democracy (DN)	191	0.03	–0.02	0	±0
Carlist Party of the Basque Country–Carlist Party (EKA–PC)	166	0.03	–0.01	0	±0
Spanish Alternative (AES)	113	0.02	New	0	±0
National Alliance (AN)	87	0.01	New	0	±0
Blank ballots	10,581	1.68	+0.42		
Total	630,917			8	–1
Valid votes	630,917	99.03	+5.25		
Invalid votes	6,177	0.97	–5.25		
Votes cast / turnout	637,094	66.59	–9.24		
Abstentions	319,615	33.41	+9.24		
Registered voters	956,709				

=== 2004 ===
Summary of the 14 March 2004 Congress of Deputies election results in Biscay
Parties and alliances	Popular vote			Seats	
Parties and alliances	Votes	%	±pp	Total	+/−
Basque Nationalist Party (EAJ/PNV)	258,488	37.29	+3.08	4	±0
Socialist Party of the Basque Country–Basque Country Left (PSE–EE (PSOE))	185,514	26.76	+3.90	3	+1
People's Party (PP)	129,889	18.74	–8.52	2	–1
United Left (EB/IU)	59,493	8.58	+2.79	0	±0
Basque Solidarity (EA)	30,096	4.34	–0.74	0	±0
Aralar–Stand up (Aralar–Zutik)	12,791	1.85	New	0	±0
Party of the Democratic Karma (PKD)	2,300	0.33	–0.09	0	±0
Humanist Party (PH)	1,846	0.27	+0.03	0	±0
Internationalist Socialist Workers' Party (POSI)	1,682	0.24	+0.14	0	±0
Democratic and Social Centre (CDS)	789	0.11	+0.06	0	±0
Republican Left (IR)	407	0.06	New	0	±0
National Democracy (DN)	348	0.05	New	0	±0
Republican Social Movement (MSR)	264	0.04	New	0	±0
Carlist Party of the Basque Country–Carlist Party (EKA–PC)	243	0.04	New	0	±0
The Phalanx (FE)	147	0.02	–0.02	0	±0
Spanish Phalanx of the CNSO (FE de las JONS)^{1}	134	0.02	–0.01	0	±0
Blank ballots	8,754	1.26	–1.44		
Total	693,185			9	±0
Valid votes	693,185	93.78	–5.13		
Invalid votes	45,979	6.22	+5.13		
Votes cast / turnout	739,164	75.83	+8.84		
Abstentions	235,578	24.17	–8.84		
Registered voters	974,742				
Sources
Footnotes: ^{1} Spanish Phalanx of the CNSO results are compared to Independent Spanish Phalanx–Phalanx 2000 totals in the 2000 election.

=== 2000 ===
Summary of the 12 March 2000 Congress of Deputies election results in Biscay
Parties and alliances	Popular vote			Seats	
Parties and alliances	Votes	%	±pp	Total	+/−
Basque Nationalist Party (EAJ/PNV)	222,479	34.21	+5.01	4	+1
People's Party (PP)	177,272	27.26	+8.82	3	+1
Socialist Party of the Basque Country–Basque Country Left (PSE–EE (PSOE))	148,670	22.86	–0.93	2	±0
United Left (EB/IU)	37,677	5.79	–3.93	0	–1
Basque Solidarity (EA)	33,047	5.08	–0.10	0	±0
The Greens (B/LV)	5,469	0.84	+0.40	0	±0
Party of the Democratic Karma (PKD)	2,759	0.42	New	0	±0
Humanist Party (PH)	1,579	0.24	+0.18	0	±0
Natural Law Party (PLN)	1,025	0.16	New	0	±0
Internationalist Socialist Workers' Party (POSI)	662	0.10	New	0	±0
Communist Party of the Peoples of Spain (PCPE)	534	0.08	New	0	±0
Democratic and Social Centre–Centrist Union (CDS–UC)	348	0.05	–0.01	0	±0
Republican Action (AR)	281	0.04	New	0	±0
Spain 2000 Platform (ES2000)	246	0.04	New	0	±0
The Phalanx (FE)	243	0.04	New	0	±0
Carlist Party (EKA)	182	0.03	New	0	±0
Independent Spanish Phalanx–Phalanx 2000 (FEI–FE 2000)	179	0.03	+0.01	0	±0
Internationalist Struggle (LI (LIT–CI))	151	0.02	New	0	±0
Basque Citizens (EH)^{1}	0	0.00	–9.94	0	–1
Blank ballots	17,584	2.70	+1.40		
Total	650,387			9	±0
Valid votes	650,387	98.91	–0.41		
Invalid votes	7,138	1.09	+0.41		
Votes cast / turnout	657,525	66.99	–5.50		
Abstentions	324,046	33.01	+5.50		
Registered voters	981,571				
Sources
Footnotes: ^{1} Basque Citizens results are compared to Popular Unity totals in the 1996 election. EH called for election boycott and urged its supporters to abstain.

=== 1996 ===
Summary of the 3 March 1996 Congress of Deputies election results in Biscay
Parties and alliances	Popular vote			Seats	
Parties and alliances	Votes	%	±pp	Total	+/−
Basque Nationalist Party (EAJ/PNV)	204,056	29.20	–0.34	3	±0
Socialist Party of the Basque Country–Basque Country Left (PSE–EE (PSOE))	166,293	23.79	–1.08	2	–1
People's Party (PP)	128,904	18.44	+3.15	2	±0
Popular Unity (HB)	69,472	9.94	–2.58	1	±0
United Left (IU/EB)	67,954	9.72	+2.67	1	+1
Basque Solidarity (EA)	36,234	5.18	–1.13	0	±0
Basque Citizen Initiative (ICV–Gorordo)	11,833	1.69	New	0	±0
European Greens–Basque Country Greens (VE–EHB)	774	0.44	–0.57	0	±0
Workers' Revolutionary Party (PRT)^{1}	560	0.08	–0.38	0	±0
Centrist Union (UC)	430	0.06	–0.73	0	±0
Humanist Party (PH)	394	0.06	+0.01	0	±0
Republican Coalition (CR)^{2}	331	0.05	+0.01	0	±0
Authentic Spanish Phalanx (FEA)	139	0.02	New	0	±0
Independent Spanish Phalanx (FEI)	138	0.02	New	0	±0
Revolutionary Workers' Party (POR)	0	0.00	–0.06	0	±0
Blank ballots	9,063	1.30	+0.09		
Total	698,859			9	±0
Valid votes	698,859	99.32	+0.14		
Invalid votes	4,770	0.68	–0.14		
Votes cast / turnout	703,629	72.49	+1.41		
Abstentions	266,963	27.51	–1.41		
Registered voters	970,592				
Sources
Footnotes: ^{1} Workers' Revolutionary Party results are compared to Workers' Socialist Party totals in the 1993 election.; ^{2} Republican Coalition results are compared to Coalition for a New Socialist Party totals in the 1993 election.

=== 1993 ===
Summary of the 6 June 1993 Congress of Deputies election results in Biscay
Parties and alliances	Popular vote			Seats	
Parties and alliances	Votes	%	±pp	Total	+/−
Basque Nationalist Party (EAJ/PNV)	197,392	29.54	+1.63	3	±0
Socialist Party of the Basque Country–Basque Country Left (PSE–EE (PSOE))^{1}	166,172	24.87	–3.81	3	±0
People's Party (PP)	102,172	15.29	+5.59	2	+1
Popular Unity (HB)	83,644	12.52	–2.53	1	–1
United Left (IU/EB)	47,091	7.05	+3.44	0	±0
Basque Solidarity–Basque Left (EA–EuE)	42,175	6.31	–1.56	0	–1
The Greens (Berdeak/LV)	6,769	1.01	New	0	±0
Democratic and Social Centre (CDS)	5,285	0.79	–2.65	0	±0
The Ecologists (LE)	3,215	0.48	–0.59	0	±0
Workers' Socialist Party (PST)	3,053	0.46	+0.12	0	±0
Ruiz-Mateos Group–European Democratic Alliance (ARM–ADE)	1,359	0.20	–0.56	0	±0
Referendum Tolerant Independent Political Party (PITRCG)	408	0.06	New	0	±0
Revolutionary Workers' Party (POR)	405	0.06	–0.02	0	±0
Natural Law Party (PLN)	387	0.06	New	0	±0
Humanist Party (PH)	353	0.05	–0.03	0	±0
Coalition for a New Socialist Party (CNPS)^{2}	251	0.04	–0.02	0	±0
Communist Unification of Spain (UCE)	0	0.00	New	0	±0
Blank ballots	8,060	1.21	+0.53		
Total	668,191			9	–1
Valid votes	668,191	99.18	+0.15		
Invalid votes	5,495	0.82	–0.15		
Votes cast / turnout	673,686	71.08	+3.79		
Abstentions	274,085	28.92	–3.79		
Registered voters	947,771				
Sources
Footnotes: ^{1} Socialist Party of the Basque Country–Basque Country Left results are compared to the combined totals of Socialist Party of the Basque Country and Basque Country Left in the 1989 election.; ^{2} Coalition for a New Socialist Party results are compared to Alliance for the Republic totals in the 1989 election.

=== 1989 ===
Summary of the 29 October 1989 Congress of Deputies election results in Biscay
Parties and alliances	Popular vote			Seats	
Parties and alliances	Votes	%	±pp	Total	+/−
Basque Nationalist Party (EAJ/PNV)	171,582	27.91	–1.40	3	±0
Socialist Party of the Basque Country (PSE–PSOE)	127,744	20.78	–5.78	2	–1
Popular Unity (HB)	92,493	15.05	–0.86	2	±0
People's Party (PP)^{1}	59,632	9.70	–0.97	1	±0
Basque Country Left (EE)	48,559	7.90	–0.46	1	±0
Basque Solidarity (EA)	48,355	7.87	New	1	+1
United Left (IU/EB)	22,169	3.61	+2.03	0	±0
Democratic and Social Centre (CDS)	21,144	3.44	–1.51	0	±0
The Ecologist Greens (LVE)	6,589	1.07	New	0	±0
Ruiz-Mateos Group (Ruiz-Mateos)	4,682	0.76	New	0	±0
Workers' Party of the Basque Country–Basque Country Workers (PTE–EL)^{2}	3,125	0.51	–0.61	0	±0
Workers' Socialist Party (PST)	2,099	0.34	–0.10	0	±0
Communist Party of the Peoples of Spain (PCPE)	546	0.09	New	0	±0
Humanist Party (PH)	521	0.08	New	0	±0
Revolutionary Workers' Party of Spain (PORE)	510	0.08	New	0	±0
Spanish Phalanx of the CNSO (FE–JONS)	400	0.07	–0.05	0	±0
Alliance for the Republic (AxR)^{3}	398	0.06	–0.10	0	±0
Communist Party of Spain (Marxist–Leninist) (PCE (m–l))^{4}	0	0.00	–0.12	0	±0
Revolutionary Communist League–Communist Movement (LKI–EMK)^{5}	0	0.00	±0.00	0	±0
Blank ballots	4,176	0.68	+0.20		
Total	614,724			10	±0
Valid votes	614,724	99.03	+1.04		
Invalid votes	6,044	0.97	–1.04		
Votes cast / turnout	620,768	67.29	–1.03		
Abstentions	301,825	32.71	+1.03		
Registered voters	922,593				
Sources
Footnotes: ^{1} People's Party results are compared to People's Coalition totals in the 1986 election.; ^{2} Workers' Party of the Basque Country–Basque Country Workers results are compared to Communist Party of the Basque Country totals in the 1986 election.; ^{3} Alliance for the Republic results are compared to Internationalist Socialist Workers' Party totals in the 1986 election.; ^{4} Communist Party of Spain (Marxist–Leninist) results are compared to Republican Popular Unity totals in the 1986 election.; ^{5} Revolutionary Communist League–Communist Movement results are compared to the combined totals of Communist Movement of the Basque Country and Revolutionary Communist League in the 1986 election.

=== 1986 ===
Summary of the 22 June 1986 Congress of Deputies election results in Biscay
Parties and alliances	Popular vote			Seats	
Parties and alliances	Votes	%	±pp	Total	+/−
Basque Nationalist Party (EAJ/PNV)	179,130	29.31	–4.07	3	–1
Socialist Party of the Basque Country (PSE–PSOE)	162,323	26.56	–3.08	3	–1
Popular Unity (HB)	97,252	15.91	+2.80	2	+1
People's Coalition (AP–PDP–PL)^{1}	65,212	10.67	–1.35	1	±0
Basque Country Left (EE)	51,090	8.36	+1.80	1	+1
Democratic and Social Centre (CDS)	30,286	4.95	+3.47	0	±0
United Left (IU)	9,638	1.58	New	0	±0
Communist Party of the Basque Country (PCE/EPK)	6,863	1.12	–1.07	0	±0
Workers' Socialist Party (PST)	2,659	0.44	–0.13	0	±0
Communist Unification of Spain (UCE)	1,397	0.23	+0.05	0	±0
Internationalist Socialist Workers' Party (POSI)	981	0.16	New	0	±0
Spanish Phalanx of the CNSO (FE–JONS)	751	0.12	New	0	±0
Republican Popular Unity (UPR)^{2}	704	0.12	+0.05	0	±0
Communist Movement of the Basque Country (EMK)	0	0.00	±0.00	0	±0
Revolutionary Communist League (LKI)	0	0.00	±0.00	0	±0
Party of the Communists of Catalonia (PCC)	0	0.00	New	0	±0
Blank ballots	2,935	0.48	–0.02		
Total	611,221			10	±0
Valid votes	611,221	97.99	+0.16		
Invalid votes	12,549	2.01	–0.16		
Votes cast / turnout	623,770	68.32	–11.20		
Abstentions	289,194	31.68	+11.20		
Registered voters	912,964				
Sources
Footnotes: ^{1} People's Coalition results are compared to AP–PDP–PDL–UCD totals in the 1982 election.; ^{2} Republican Popular Unity results are compared to Communist Party of Spain (Marxist–Leninist) totals in the 1982 election.

=== 1982 ===
Summary of the 28 October 1982 Congress of Deputies election results in Biscay
Parties and alliances	Popular vote			Seats	
Parties and alliances	Votes	%	±pp	Total	+/−
Basque Nationalist Party (EAJ/PNV)	221,801	33.38	+4.20	4	±0
Socialist Party of the Basque Country (PSE–PSOE)	196,974	29.64	+10.58	4	+2
Popular Unity (HB)	87,100	13.11	–1.40	1	–1
Democratic Coalition (AP–PDP–PDL–UCD)^{1}	79,866	12.02	–8.20	1	–1
Basque Country Left–Left for Socialism (EE)	43,591	6.56	+0.71	0	±0
Communist Party of the Basque Country (PCE/EPK)	14,537	2.19	–3.58	0	±0
Democratic and Social Centre (CDS)	9,815	1.48	New	0	±0
Workers' Socialist Party (PST)	3,815	0.57	New	0	±0
New Force (FN)^{2}	1,289	0.19	–1.17	0	±0
Communist Unification of Spain (UCE)	1,225	0.18	New	0	±0
Communist Unity Candidacy (CUC)	761	0.11	New	0	±0
Communist Party of Spain (Marxist–Leninist) (PCE (m–l))	478	0.07	New	0	±0
Revolutionary Communist League (LKI)	0	0.00	–0.55	0	±0
Socialist Party (PS)^{3}	0	0.00	–0.75	0	±0
Communist League–Internationalist Socialist Workers' Coalition (LC (COSI))	0	0.00	New	0	±0
Communist Movement of the Basque Country (EMK)	0	0.00	–1.32	0	±0
Blank ballots	3,318	0.50	+0.30		
Total	664,570			10	±0
Valid votes	664,570	97.83	+0.04		
Invalid votes	14,728	2.17	–0.04		
Votes cast / turnout	679,298	79.52	+14.19		
Abstentions	174,906	20.48	–14.19		
Registered voters	854,204				
Sources
Footnotes: ^{1} AP–PDP–PDL–UCD results are compared to the combined totals of the Foral Union of the Basque Country and Union of the Democratic Centre in the 1979 election.; ^{2} New Force results are compared to National Union totals in the 1979 election.; ^{3} Socialist Party results are compared to Spanish Socialist Workers' Party (historical) totals in the 1979 election.

=== 1979 ===
Summary of the 1 March 1979 Congress of Deputies election results in Biscay
Parties and alliances	Popular vote			Seats	
Parties and alliances	Votes	%	±pp	Total	+/−
Basque Nationalist Party (EAJ/PNV)	161,480	29.18	–1.74	4	±0
Socialist Party of the Basque Country (PSE–PSOE)^{1}	105,481	19.06	–8.38	2	–1
Union of the Democratic Centre (UCD)	88,431	15.98	–0.43	2	±0
Popular Unity (HB)^{2}	80,280	14.51	+10.97	2	+2
Basque Country Left (EE)	32,363	5.85	+0.42	0	±0
Communist Party of the Basque Country (PCE/EPK)	31,942	5.77	+0.38	0	±0
Foral Union of the Basque Country (UFPV)^{3}	23,484	4.24	–2.40	0	–1
National Union (UN)	7,521	1.36	New	0	±0
Communist Movement–Organization of Communist Left (MC–OIC)	7,292	1.32	New	0	±0
Spanish Socialist Workers' Party (historical) (PSOEh)^{4}	4,131	0.75	–0.37	0	±0
Revolutionary Communist League (LCR)^{5}	3,039	0.55	–0.26	0	±0
Workers' Revolutionary Organization (ORT)^{6}	2,932	0.53	+0.02	0	±0
Carlist Party (PC)	1,380	0.25	New	0	±0
Republican Left of the Basque Country (IR–E)	1,229	0.22	New	0	±0
Spanish Phalanx of the CNSO (Authentic) (FE–JONS(A))	795	0.14	New	0	±0
Proverist Party (PPr)	500	0.09	New	0	±0
Union for the Freedom of Speech (ULE)	0	0.00	New	0	±0
Blank ballots	1,127	0.20	–0.01		
Total	553,407			10	±0
Valid votes	553,407	97.79	+0.64		
Invalid votes	12,478	2.21	–0.64		
Votes cast / turnout	565,885	65.33	–11.05		
Abstentions	300,300	34.67	+11.05		
Registered voters	866,185				
Sources
Footnotes: ^{1} Socialist Party of the Basque Country results are compared to the combined totals of Socialist Party of the Basque Country and People's Socialist Party–Socialist Unity in the 1977 election.; ^{2} Popular Unity results are compared to the combined totals of the Basque Socialist Party and Basque Nationalist Action in the 1977 election.; ^{3} Foral Union of the Basque Country results are compared to People's Alliance totals in the 1977 election.; ^{4} Spanish Socialist Workers' Party (historical) results are compared to Democratic Socialist Alliance totals in the 1977 election.; ^{5} Revolutionary Communist League results are compared to Front for Workers' Unity totals in the 1977 election.; ^{6} Workers' Revolutionary Organization results are compared to Workers' Electoral Group totals in the 1977 election.

=== 1977 ===
Summary of the 15 June 1977 Congress of Deputies election results in Biscay
Parties and alliances	Popular vote			Seats	
Parties and alliances	Votes	%	±pp	Total	+/−
Basque Nationalist Party (EAJ/PNV)	171,991	30.92	n/a	4	n/a
Socialist Party of the Basque Country (PSE–PSOE)	140,643	25.28	n/a	3	n/a
Union of the Democratic Centre (UCD)	91,262	16.41	n/a	2	n/a
People's Alliance (AP)	36,934	6.64	n/a	1	n/a
Basque Country Left (EE)	30,209	5.43	n/a	0	n/a
Communist Party of the Basque Country (PCE/EPK)	29,968	5.39	n/a	0	n/a
Basque Socialist Party (ESB/PSV)	15,079	2.71	n/a	0	n/a
People's Socialist Party–Socialist Unity (PSP–US)	12,038	2.16	n/a	0	n/a
Democratic Socialist Alliance (ASDCI)	6,224	1.12	n/a	0	n/a
Basque Christian Democracy (DCV)	6,034	1.08	n/a	0	n/a
Basque Nationalist Action (EAE/ANV)	4,617	0.83	n/a	0	n/a
Front for Workers' Unity (FUT)	4,478	0.81	n/a	0	n/a
Workers' Electoral Group (AET)	2,825	0.51	n/a	0	n/a
Democratic Left Front (FDI)	2,767	0.50	n/a	0	n/a
Blank ballots	1,166	0.21	n/a		
Total	556,235			10	n/a
Valid votes	556,235	97.15	n/a		
Invalid votes	16,313	2.85	n/a		
Votes cast / turnout	572,548	76.38	n/a		
Abstentions	177,024	23.62	n/a		
Registered voters	749,572				

== Bibliography ==
- Ley 1/1977, de 4 de enero, para la Reforma Política (Fundamental Law 1/1977). Official State Gazette (in Spanish). 4 January 1977. BOE-A-1977-165.
- Real Decreto-ley 20/1977, de 18 de marzo, sobre Normas Electorales (Royal Decree-Law 20/1977). Official State Gazette (in Spanish). 18 March 1977. BOE-A-1977-7445.
- Constitución Española (Constitution). Official State Gazette (in Spanish). 27 December 1978. BOE-A-1978-31229.
- Ley Orgánica 5/1985, de 19 de junio, del Régimen Electoral General (Organic Law 5/1985). Official State Gazette (in Spanish). 19 June 1985. BOE-A-1985-11672.
- Carreras de Odriozola, Albert; Tafunell Sambola, Xavier (2005) [1989]. Estadísticas históricas de España, siglos XIX-XX (PDF) (in Spanish). Vol. 1 (II ed.). Bilbao: Fundación BBVA. pp. 1072–1097. ISBN 84-96515-00-1. Archived from the original (PDF) on 24 September 2015.
