= Second government of José Luis Rodríguez Zapatero =

2008–2011 government of Spain

2nd government of José Luis Rodríguez Zapatero
- Government of Spain
- 2008–2011
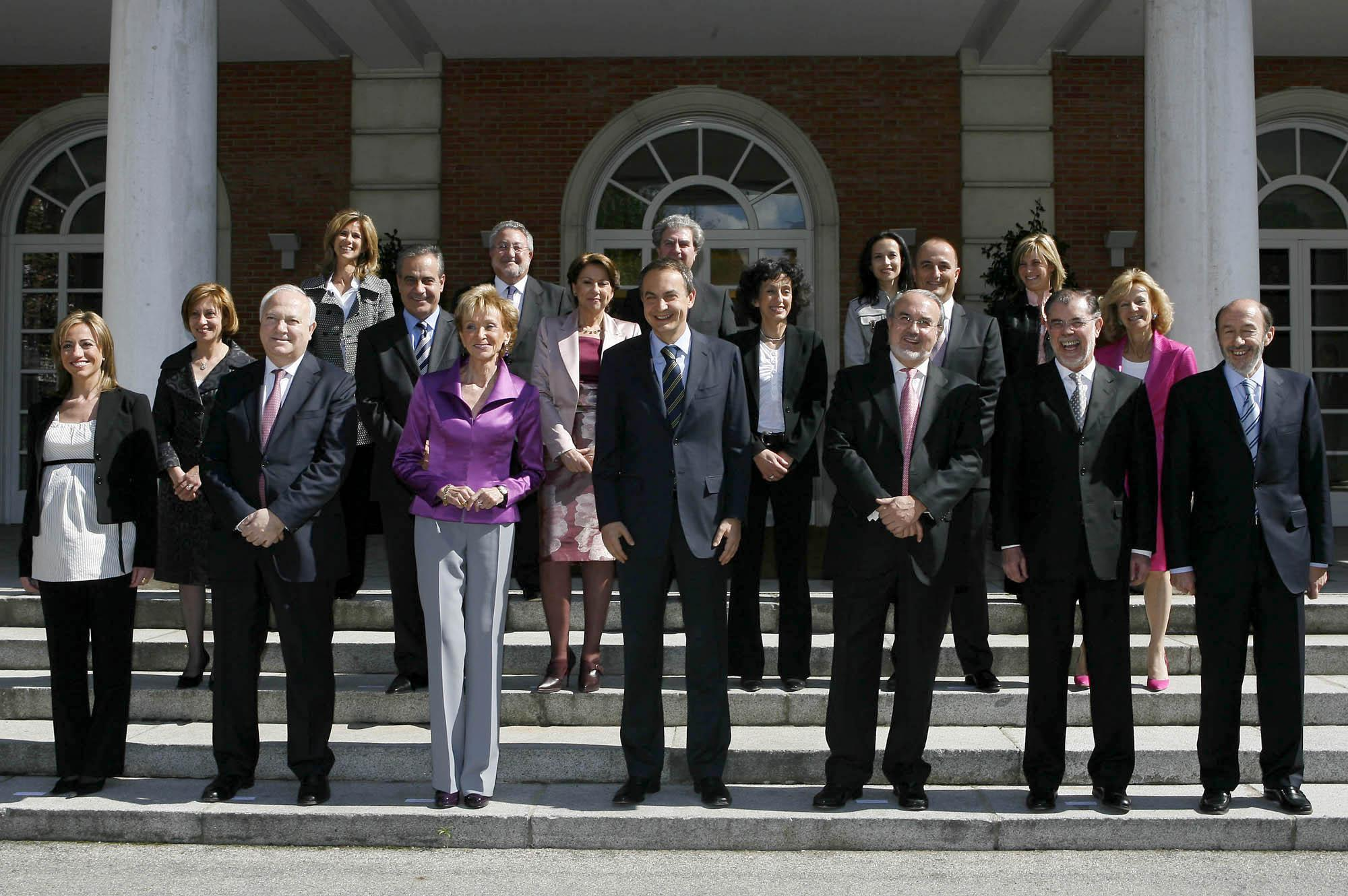
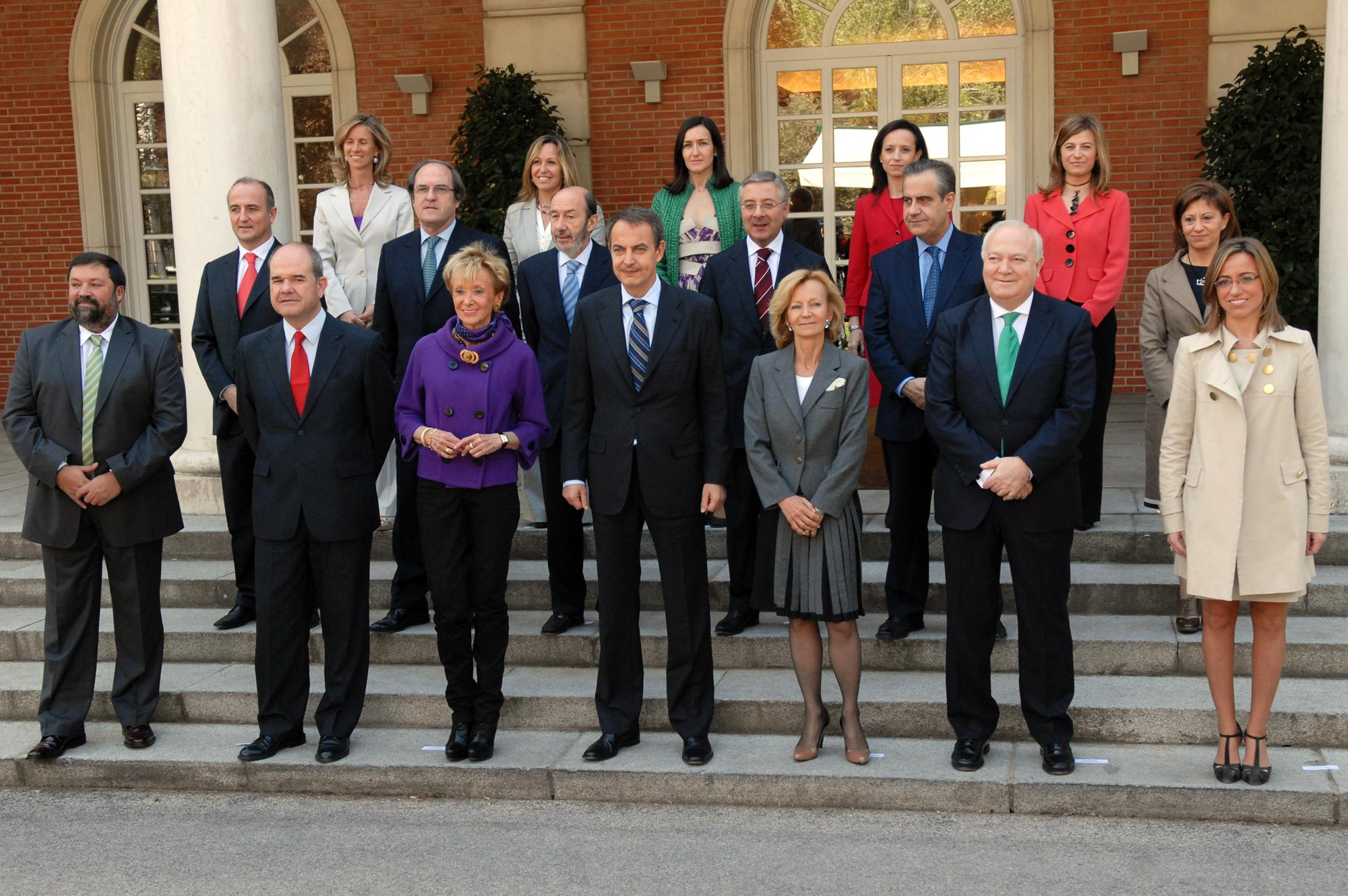
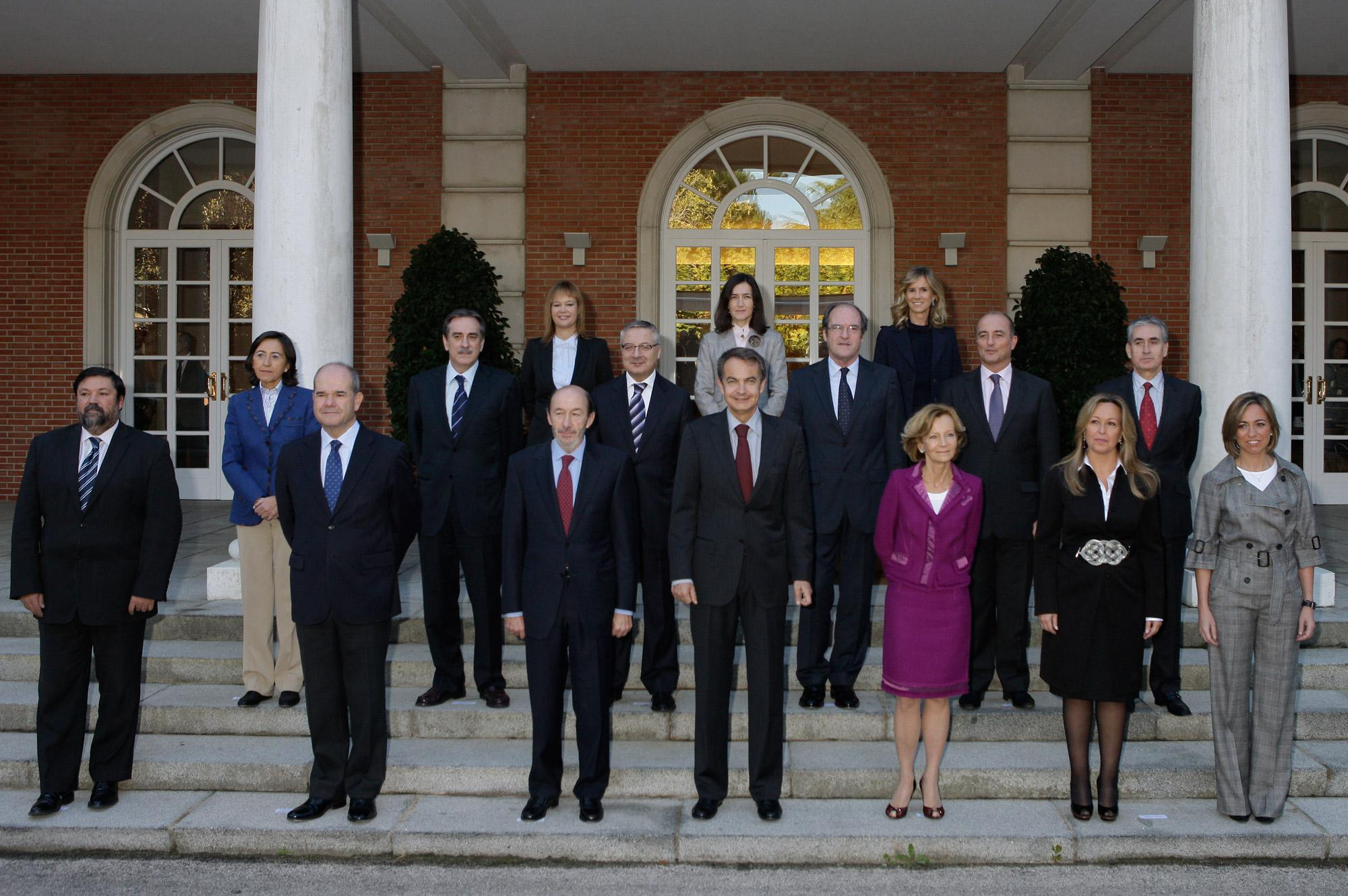
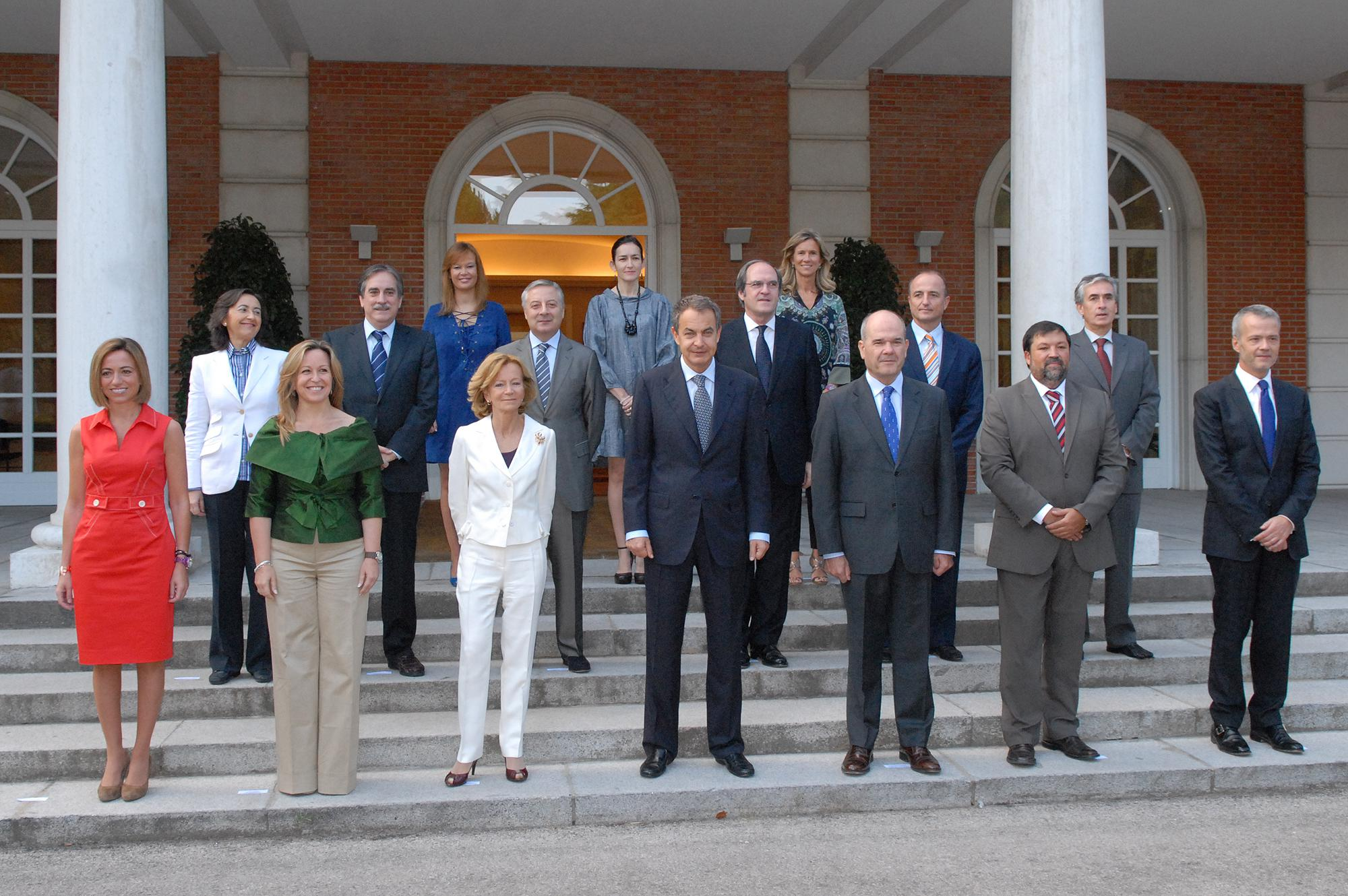
- The government in April 2008 (top left), April 2009 (top right), November 2010 (bottom left) and July 2011 (bottom right)
- Date formed: 14 April 2008
- Date dissolved: 22 December 2011

People and organisations
- Monarch: Juan Carlos I
- Prime Minister: José Luis Rodríguez Zapatero
- Deputy Prime Ministers: First: María Teresa Fernández de la Vega (2008–2010); Alfredo Pérez Rubalcaba (2010–2011); Elena Salgado (2011); Second: Pedro Solbes (2008–2009); Elena Salgado (2009–2011); Manuel Chaves (2011); Third: Manuel Chaves (2009–2011)
- No. of ministers: 17 (Note: Does not include the prime minister.) (2008–2010); 15 (2010–2011)
- Total no. of members: 28
- Member party: PSOE
- Status in legislature: Minority (single-party)
- Opposition party: PP
- Opposition leader: Mariano Rajoy

History
- Election: 2008 general election
- Outgoing election: 2011 general election
- Legislature term: 9th Cortes Generales
- Budget: 2009, 2010, 2011
- Predecessor: Zapatero I
- Successor: Rajoy I

The second government of José Luis Rodríguez Zapatero was formed on 14 April 2008, following the latter's election as prime minister of Spain by the Congress of Deputies on 11 April and his swearing-in on 12 April, as a result of the Spanish Socialist Workers' Party (PSOE) emerging as the largest parliamentary force at the 2008 Spanish general election. It succeeded the first Zapatero government and was the government of Spain from 14 April 2008 to 22 December 2011, a total of 1,347 days, or 3 years, 8 months and 8 days.

The cabinet comprised members of the PSOE (including its sister party, the Socialists' Party of Catalonia, PSC) and a number of independents. It was automatically dismissed on 21 November 2011 as a consequence of the 2011 general election, but remained in acting capacity until the next government was sworn in.

== Investiture ==
Investiture; Congress of Deputies; Nomination of José Luis Rodríguez Zapatero (PSOE)
| Ballot → | 9 April 2008 | 11 April 2008 |
| Required majority → | 176 out of 350 | Simple |
| Yes: • PSOE (169) (168 on 9 Apr) | 168 / 350 | 169 / 350 |
| No: • PP (154); • ERC (3); • UPyD (1) | 158 / 350 | 158 / 350 |
| Abstentions: • CiU (10); • PNV (6); • IU–ICV (2); • BNG (2); • CC (2); • NaBai (1) | 23 / 350 | 23 / 350 |
| Abstentees: • PSOE (1) (on 9 Apr) | 1 / 350 | 0 / 350 |

== Cabinet changes ==
Zapatero's second government saw a number of cabinet changes during its tenure:

- On 23 February 2009, Mariano Fernández Bermejo resigned as Minister of Justice after it transpired that he had participated in a hunting trip in Andalusia together with Judge Baltasar Garzón—at the time, responsible for the ongoing Gürtel affair investigations involving senior People's Party (PP) members. Bermejo came under fire from PP leaders, who accused him of interfering within the investigations. While he denied such claims, he submitted his resignation due to the growing political pressure on him. He was succeeded by Francisco Caamaño.
- On 7 April 2009, the cabinet saw an extensive reshuffle. Pedro Solbes stepped down as Second Deputy Prime Minister and Minister of Economy and Finance and was replaced by Elena Salgado, who in turn stepped down as Minister of Public Administrations. President of Andalusia Manuel Chaves was appointed as Third Deputy Prime Minister and new Minister of Territorial Policy. José Blanco replaced Magdalena Álvarez as Minister of Development; Ángel Gabilondo replaced Mercedes Cabrera in Education; Ángeles González-Sinde replaced César Antonio Molina in Culture and Trinidad Jiménez replaced Bernat Soria as Minister of Health.
- On 21 October 2010, Celestino Corbacho stepped down as Minister of Labour and Immigration in order to run within the Socialists' Party of Catalonia (PSC)'s list for the 2010 Catalan regional election, being replaced by Valeriano Gómez. Zapatero took this opportunity to undertake a major cabinet reshuffle which saw María Teresa Fernández de la Vega being replaced as First Deputy Prime Minister and Spokesperson of the Government by Alfredo Pérez Rubalcaba—who retained his office as Minister of the Interior—and as Minister of the Presidency by Ramón Jáuregui. Trinidad Jiménez replaced Miguel Ángel Moratinos as Minister of Foreign Affairs and Cooperation; Rosa Aguilar replaced Elena Espinosa as Minister of Environment, Rural and Marine Affairs and Leire Pajín was appointed to the Health ministry. The ministries of Housing and Equality were restructured into state secretariats within the Development and Health ministries, respectively. Finally, Chaves's Territorial Policy portfolio was restructured into the Ministry of Territorial Policy and Public Administration.
- On 12 July 2011, Rubalcaba stepped down from the government after having been nominated as the Spanish Socialist Workers' Party (PSOE)'s leading candidate for the 2011 general election. Subsequently, a final reshuffle took place, with changes limited to fill the vacancies: Antonio Camacho was appointed in Interior, José Blanco replaced Rubalcaba as the Government's spokesperson and the offices of the deputy prime ministers under Elena Salgado and Manuel Chaves were restructured.

== Council of Ministers ==
The Council of Ministers was structured into the offices for the prime minister, the two deputy prime ministers, 17 ministries and the post of the spokesperson of the Government. From April 2009, the Council would include a third deputy prime minister. The number of ministries was reduced to 15 after the ministries of Housing and Equality were merged into the Development and Health departments in October 2010. From July 2011, the Council would include only two deputy prime ministers.

← Zapatero II Government → (14 April 2008 – 22 December 2011)
| Portfolio | Name | Party | Took office | Left office | Ref. |
| Prime Minister | José Luis Rodríguez Zapatero | PSOE | 12 April 2008 | 21 December 2011 | |
| First Deputy Prime Minister; Minister of the Presidency; Spokesperson of the Government | Mª Teresa Fernández de la Vega | Independent | 14 April 2008 | 21 October 2010 | |
| Second Deputy Prime Minister; Minister of Economy and Finance | Pedro Solbes | Independent | 14 April 2008 | 7 April 2009 | |
| Minister of Foreign Affairs and Cooperation | Miguel Ángel Moratinos | PSOE | 14 April 2008 | 21 October 2010 | |
| Minister of Justice | Mariano Fernández Bermejo | Independent | 14 April 2008 | 23 February 2009 | |
| Minister of Defence | Carme Chacón | PSOE^{/PSC} | 14 April 2008 | 22 December 2011 | |
| Minister of the Interior | Alfredo Pérez Rubalcaba | PSOE | 14 April 2008 | 21 October 2010 | |
| Minister of Development | Magdalena Álvarez | PSOE | 14 April 2008 | 7 April 2009 | |
| Minister of Education, Social Policy and Sports | Mercedes Cabrera | Independent | 14 April 2008 | 7 April 2009 | |
| Minister of Labour and Immigration | Celestino Corbacho | PSOE^{/PSC} | 14 April 2008 | 21 October 2010 | |
| Minister of Industry, Tourism and Trade | Miguel Sebastián | Independent | 14 April 2008 | 22 December 2011 | |
| Minister of Environment and Rural and Marine Affairs | Elena Espinosa | PSOE | 14 April 2008 | 21 October 2010 | |
| Minister of Public Administrations | Elena Salgado | Independent | 14 April 2008 | 7 April 2009 | |
| Minister of Culture | César Antonio Molina | Independent | 14 April 2008 | 7 April 2009 | |
| Minister of Health and Consumer Affairs | Bernat Soria | Independent | 14 April 2008 | 7 April 2009 | |
| Minister of Housing | Beatriz Corredor | PSOE | 14 April 2008 | 21 October 2010 | |
| Minister of Science and Innovation | Cristina Garmendia | Independent | 14 April 2008 | 22 December 2011 | |
| Minister of Equality | Bibiana Aído | PSOE | 14 April 2008 | 21 October 2010 | |
=== Changes February 2009 ===
| Portfolio | Name | Party | Took office | Left office | Ref. |
| Minister of Justice | Francisco Caamaño | PSOE | 24 February 2009 | 22 December 2011 | |
=== Changes April 2009 ===
| Portfolio | Name | Party | Took office | Left office | Ref. |
| Second Deputy Prime Minister; Minister of Economy and Finance | Elena Salgado | Independent | 7 April 2009 | 12 July 2011 | |
| Third Deputy Prime Minister (Note: On 7 April 2009, the ministries of Education, Social Policy and Sports, Public Administrations and Health and Consumer Affairs were reorganized as the Education, Territorial Policy and Health and Social Policy departments, respectively. Concurrently, the post of the Third Deputy Prime Minister was established.); Minister of Territorial Policy | Manuel Chaves | PSOE | 7 April 2009 | 21 October 2010 | |
| Minister of Development | José Blanco | PSOE | 7 April 2009 | 12 July 2011 | |
| Minister of Education | Ángel Gabilondo | Independent | 7 April 2009 | 22 December 2011 | |
| Minister of Culture | Ángeles González-Sinde | Independent | 7 April 2009 | 22 December 2011 | |
| Minister of Health and Social Policy | Trinidad Jiménez | PSOE | 7 April 2009 | 21 October 2010 | |
=== Changes October 2010 ===
| Portfolio | Name | Party | Took office | Left office | Ref. |
| First Deputy Prime Minister; Minister of the Interior; Spokesperson of the Government | Alfredo Pérez Rubalcaba | PSOE | 21 October 2010 | 12 July 2011 | |
| Third Deputy Prime Minister; Minister of Territorial Policy and Public Administration (Note: On 21 October 2010, the ministries of Health and Social Policy and Territorial Policy were reorganized as the Health, Social Policy and Equality and Territorial Policy and Public Administration departments, respectively. Concurrently, the ministries of Equality the Housing were disestablished and their competences transferred to the Health, Social Policy and Equality and Development departments, respectively.) | Manuel Chaves | PSOE | 21 October 2010 | 12 July 2011 | |
| Minister of Foreign Affairs and Cooperation | Trinidad Jiménez | PSOE | 21 October 2010 | 22 December 2011 | |
| Minister of Labour and Immigration | Valeriano Gómez | PSOE | 21 October 2010 | 22 December 2011 | |
| Minister of Environment and Rural and Marine Affairs | Rosa Aguilar | Independent | 21 October 2010 | 22 December 2011 | |
| Minister of the Presidency | Ramón Jáuregui | PSOE | 21 October 2010 | 22 December 2011 | |
| Minister of Health, Social Policy and Equality | Leire Pajín | PSOE | 21 October 2010 | 22 December 2011 | |
| ~~Minister of Housing~~ | Disestablished on 21 October 2010. | | | | |
| ~~Minister of Equality~~ | Disestablished on 21 October 2010. | | | | |
=== Changes July 2011 ===
| Portfolio | Name | Party | Took office | Left office | Ref. |
| Deputy Prime Minister for Economic Affairs (Note: Following Alfredo Pérez Rubalcaba's stepping down as First Deputy Prime Minister on 12 July 2011, the second and third deputy prime ministers were promoted to the posts of deputy prime ministers for Economic Affairs and for Territorial Policy, respectively, with the post of third deputy prime minister being discontinued.); Minister of Economy and Finance | Elena Salgado | Independent | 12 July 2011 | 22 December 2011 | |
| Deputy Prime Minister for Territorial Policy; Minister of Territorial Policy and Public Administration | Manuel Chaves | PSOE | 12 July 2011 | 22 December 2011 | |
| ~~Third Deputy Prime Minister~~ | Discontinued on 12 July 2011. | | | | |
| Minister of the Interior | Antonio Camacho | Independent | 12 July 2011 | 22 December 2011 | |
| Minister of Development; Spokesperson of the Government | José Blanco | PSOE | 12 July 2011 | 22 December 2011 | |

== Departmental structure ==
José Luis Rodríguez Zapatero's second government was organised into several superior and governing units, whose number, powers and hierarchical structure varied depending on the ministerial department.

Unit/body rank

- (■) Secretary of state
- (■) Undersecretary
- (■) Director-general
- (●) Autonomous agency
- (◆) Military & intelligence agency

| Office (Original name) | Portrait | Name | Took office | Left office | Alliance/party | Ref. |
=== Prime Minister's Office ===
| Prime Minister (Presidencia del Gobierno) | | José Luis Rodríguez Zapatero | 12 April 2008 | 21 December 2011 | PSOE | |
| Prime Minister (Presidencia del Gobierno) | 22 April 2008 – 22 July 2011: (■) Cabinet of the Prime Minister's Office–Chief of Staff; (■) Deputy Chief of Staff; (■) Economic Office of the Prime Minister; (■) Department of Economic Policy (D/G 1 Jul 2010); (■) Department of Social and Industrial Policy; (■) Department of Institutional Affairs; (■) Department of International Policy and Security; (■) Department of Analysis and Studies; (■) Department of Education and Culture (D/G 7 May 2010); (■) General Secretariat of the Prime Minister's Office; (■) Deputy General Secretariat; (■) Department of Protocol; (■) Department of Security; (■) Department of Infrastructure and Monitoring for Crisis Situations (D/G 7 May 2010); (●) High Council for Sports (from 7 Apr 2009); (■) President's Office of the High Council for Sports (from 7 Apr 2009); (■) Directorate-General for Sports (from 7 Apr 2009); (■) Directorate-General for Sports Infrastructure (from 7 Apr 2009); 22 July – 24 December 2011: (■) Cabinet of the Prime Minister's Office–Chief of Staff; (■) Deputy Chief of Staff; (■) Economic Office of the Prime Minister; (■) Department of Social and Industrial Policy; (■) General Secretariat of the Prime Minister's Office; (■) Department of Protocol; (■) Department of Security; (■) Department of Institutional Affairs; (■) Department of International Policy and Security; (■) Department of Analysis and Studies; (●) High Council for Sports; (■) President's Office of the High Council for Sports; (■) Directorate-General for Sports; (■) Directorate-General for Sports Infrastructure | | | | | |
| First Deputy Prime Minister (Vicepresidencia Primera del Gobierno) (until 12 July 2011) Deputy Prime Minister for Economic Affairs (Vicepresidencia del Gobierno de Asuntos Económicos) (from 12 July 2011) | | Mª Teresa Fernández de la Vega | 14 April 2008 | 21 October 2010 | PSOE (Independent) | |
| First Deputy Prime Minister (Vicepresidencia Primera del Gobierno) (until 12 July 2011) Deputy Prime Minister for Economic Affairs (Vicepresidencia del Gobierno de Asuntos Económicos) (from 12 July 2011) | | Alfredo Pérez Rubalcaba | 21 October 2010 | 12 July 2011 | PSOE | |
| First Deputy Prime Minister (Vicepresidencia Primera del Gobierno) (until 12 July 2011) Deputy Prime Minister for Economic Affairs (Vicepresidencia del Gobierno de Asuntos Económicos) (from 12 July 2011) | | Elena Salgado | 12 July 2011 | 22 December 2011 | PSOE (Independent) | |
| First Deputy Prime Minister (Vicepresidencia Primera del Gobierno) (until 12 July 2011) Deputy Prime Minister for Economic Affairs (Vicepresidencia del Gobierno de Asuntos Económicos) (from 12 July 2011) | See Ministry of the Presidency (14 April 2008 – 21 October 2010); See Ministry of the Interior (21 October 2010 – 12 July 2011); See Ministry of Economy and Finance (12 July – 22 December 2011) | | | | | |
| Second Deputy Prime Minister (Vicepresidencia Segunda del Gobierno) (until 12 July 2011) Deputy Prime Minister for Territorial Policy (Vicepresidencia del Gobierno de Política Territorial) (from 12 July 2011) | | Pedro Solbes | 14 April 2008 | 7 April 2009 | PSOE (Independent) | |
| Second Deputy Prime Minister (Vicepresidencia Segunda del Gobierno) (until 12 July 2011) Deputy Prime Minister for Territorial Policy (Vicepresidencia del Gobierno de Política Territorial) (from 12 July 2011) | | Elena Salgado | 7 April 2009 | 12 July 2011 | PSOE (Independent) | |
| Second Deputy Prime Minister (Vicepresidencia Segunda del Gobierno) (until 12 July 2011) Deputy Prime Minister for Territorial Policy (Vicepresidencia del Gobierno de Política Territorial) (from 12 July 2011) | | Manuel Chaves | 12 July 2011 | 22 December 2011 | PSOE | |
| Second Deputy Prime Minister (Vicepresidencia Segunda del Gobierno) (until 12 July 2011) Deputy Prime Minister for Territorial Policy (Vicepresidencia del Gobierno de Política Territorial) (from 12 July 2011) | See Ministry of Economy and Finance (14 April 2008 – 12 July 2011); See Ministry of Territorial Policy and Public Administration (12 July – 22 December 2011) | | | | | |
| Third Deputy Prime Minister (Vicepresidencia Tercera del Gobierno) (7 April 2009 – 12 July 2011) | | Manuel Chaves | 7 April 2009 | 12 July 2011 | PSOE | |
| Third Deputy Prime Minister (Vicepresidencia Tercera del Gobierno) (7 April 2009 – 12 July 2011) | See Ministry of Territorial Policy and Public Administration | | | | | |
=== Ministry of Foreign Affairs and Cooperation ===
| Ministry of Foreign Affairs and Cooperation (Ministerio de Asuntos Exteriores y de Cooperación) | | Miguel Ángel Moratinos | 14 April 2008 | 21 October 2010 | PSOE | |
| Ministry of Foreign Affairs and Cooperation (Ministerio de Asuntos Exteriores y de Cooperación) | | Trinidad Jiménez | 21 October 2010 | 22 December 2011 | PSOE | |
| Ministry of Foreign Affairs and Cooperation (Ministerio de Asuntos Exteriores y de Cooperación) | 16 April 2008 – 28 July 2010: (■) State Secretariat for Foreign Affairs; (■) Directorate-General for Foreign Policy; (■) Directorate-General for Foreign Policy for Europe and North America (disest. 10 Jul 2008); (■) Directorate-General for Foreign Policy for Non-Community Europe and North America (est. 10 Jul 2008); (■) Directorate-General for Foreign Policy for the Mediterranean, Maghreb and the Middle East; (■) Directorate-General for Foreign Policy for Africa; (■) Directorate-General for Foreign Policy for Asia and the Pacific; (■) Directorate-General for the United Nations, Global Affairs and Human Rights; (■) Directorate-General for Strategic Affairs and Terrorism; (■) Directorate-General for International Economic Relations and Energy Affairs; (■) State Secretariat for the European Union; (■) General Secretariat for the European Union; (■) Directorate-General for Integration and Coordination of General and Economic Affairs of the European Union; (■) Directorate-General for Coordination of the Internal Market and other European Union Policies; (■) State Secretariat for International Cooperation; (■) Directorate-General for Planning and Evaluation of Development Policies; (■) State Secretariat for Ibero-America; (■) Directorate-General for Foreign Policy for Ibero-America; (■) Directorate-General for Ibero-American Multilateral Organizations; (■) Undersecretariat of Foreign Affairs and Cooperation; (■) Technical General Secretariat; (■) Directorate-General for the Foreign Service; (■) Introducer of Ambassadors; (■) General Secretariat for Consular and Migratory Affairs; (■) Directorate-General for Consular Affairs and Assistance; (■) Directorate-General for Communication Abroad; 28 July 2010 – 31 December 2011: (■) State Secretariat for Foreign and Ibero-American Affairs; (■) Directorate-General for Foreign Policy, Europe and Security; (■) Directorate-General for the Mediterranean, Maghreb and the Middle East; (■) Directorate-General for North America, Asia and the Pacific; (■) Directorate-General for Africa; (■) Directorate-General for Ibero-America; (■) Directorate-General for Multilateral Affairs; (■) State Secretariat for the European Union; (■) Directorate-General for General Affairs and Policy Coordination of the Treaty on the Functioning of the European Union; (■) State Secretariat for International Cooperation; (■) Directorate-General for Planning and Evaluation of Development Policies; (■) Undersecretariat of Foreign Affairs and Cooperation; (■) Technical General Secretariat; (■) Directorate-General for the Foreign Service; (■) Directorate-General for Consular and Migratory Affairs; (■) Directorate-General for Communication Abroad; (■) Directorate-General for International Economic Relations and Energy Affairs; (■) Introducer of Ambassadors | | | | | |
=== Ministry of Justice ===
| Ministry of Justice (Ministerio de Justicia) | | Mariano Fernández Bermejo | 14 April 2008 | 23 February 2009 (resigned) | PSOE (Independent) | |
| Ministry of Justice (Ministerio de Justicia) | | Francisco Caamaño | 24 February 2009 | 22 December 2011 | PSOE | |
| Ministry of Justice (Ministerio de Justicia) | 16 April 2008 – 26 September 2010: (■) State Secretariat for Justice; (■) Office of the Solicitor General of the State–Directorate of the State Legal Service; (■) General Secretariat for Modernization and Relations with the Administration of Justice; (■) Directorate-General for Relations with the Administration of Justice; (■) Directorate-General for Modernization of the Administration of Justice; (■) Directorate-General for Registries and Notaries; (■) Directorate-General for Religious Affairs (disest. 10 Jul 2008); (■) Directorate-General for Relations with Religions (est. 10 Jul 2008; disest. 4 Jul 2010); (■) Undersecretariat of Justice; (■) Technical General Secretariat; (■) Directorate-General for International Legal Cooperation (disest. 7 May 2010); (■) Directorate-General for International Legal Cooperation and Relations with Religions (est. 4 Jul 2010); 26 September 2010 – 31 December 2011: (■) State Secretariat for Justice; (■) General Secretariat for Modernization and Relations with the Administration of Justice; (■) Directorate-General for Relations with the Administration of Justice; (■) Directorate-General for Modernization of the Administration of Justice; (■) Directorate-General for International Legal Cooperation and Relations with Religions; (■) Undersecretariat of Justice; (■) Technical General Secretariat; (■) Directorate-General for Registries and Notaries; (■) Office of the Solicitor General of the State–Directorate of the State Legal Service | | | | | |
=== Ministry of Defence ===
| Ministry of Defence (Ministerio de Defensa) | | Carme Chacón | 14 April 2008 | 22 December 2011 | PSOE (PSC–PSOE) | |
| Ministry of Defence (Ministerio de Defensa) | 16 April 2008 – 31 December 2011: (■) State Secretariat for Defence; (■) Directorate-General for Armament and Materiel; (■) Directorate-General for Economic Affairs; (■) Directorate-General for Infrastructure; (■) Undersecretariat of Defence; (■) Technical General Secretariat; (■) Directorate-General for Personnel; (■) Directorate-General for Military Recruitment and Teaching; (■) General Secretariat for Defence Policy; (■) Directorate-General for Defence Policy; (■) Directorate-General for Defence Communication (disest. 7 May 2010); (■) Directorate-General for Institutional Defence Relations; (◆) Armed Forces; (■) Defence Staff–Chief of the Defence Staff; (■) Army–Chief of Staff of the Army; (■) Navy–Chief of Staff of the Navy; (■) Air Force–Chief of Staff of the Air Force; (◆) National Intelligence Centre; (■) State Secretariat–Directorate of the National Intelligence Centre; (■) General Secretariat of the National Intelligence Centre; (■) Technical Directorate for Resources; (■) Technical Directorate for Intelligence (from 7 Nov 2009); (■) Technical Directorate for Intelligence Support (from 7 Nov 2009); (■) Technical Directorate for Intelligence (until 7 Nov 2009); (■) Technical Directorate for Intelligence Support (until 7 Nov 2009) | | | | | |
=== Ministry of Economy and Finance ===
| Ministry of Economy and Finance (Ministerio de Economía y Hacienda) | | Pedro Solbes | 14 April 2008 | 7 April 2009 | PSOE (Independent) | |
| Ministry of Economy and Finance (Ministerio de Economía y Hacienda) | | Elena Salgado | 7 April 2009 | 22 December 2011 | PSOE (Independent) | |
| Ministry of Economy and Finance (Ministerio de Economía y Hacienda) | 16 April 2008 – 31 December 2011: (■) State Secretariat for Finance and Budgets; (■) General Secretariat for Finance; (■) Directorate-General for Taxes; (■) Directorate-General for the Cadastre; (■) Directorate-General for Financial Coordination with the Autonomous Communities and the Local Entities (7 May – 4 Nov 2010); (■) Central Economic-Administrative Court; (■) Directorate-General for the Regulation of Gambling (est. 13 Mar 2011); (■) General Secretariat for Budgets and Expenditure; (■) Directorate-General for Budgets; (■) Directorate-General for Personnel Costs and Public Pensions; (■) Directorate-General for Community Funds; (■) General Secretariat for Territorial Financing (disest. 7 May 2010); (■) Directorate-General for Financial Coordination with the Autonomous Communities and the Local Entities (until 7 May 2010); (■) Office of the Comptroller General of the State Administration; (■) Directorate-General for Financial Coordination with the Autonomous Communities and the Local Entities (from 4 Nov 2010); (■) State Secretariat for Economy; (■) General Secretariat for Economic Policy and International Economy; (■) Directorate-General for Economic Policy; (■) Directorate-General for Macroeconomic Analysis and International Economy; (■) Directorate-General for the Treasury and Financial Policy; (■) Directorate-General for Insurance and Pension Funds; (■) Directorate-General for International Financing; (■) Undersecretariat of Economy and Finance; (■) Technical General Secretariat; (■) Directorate-General for Services and Territorial Coordination (disest. 7 May 2010); (■) Directorate-General for the State Heritage; (■) Inspectorate-General of the Ministry of Economy and Finance | | | | | |
=== Ministry of the Interior ===
| Ministry of the Interior (Ministerio del Interior) | | Alfredo Pérez Rubalcaba | 14 April 2008 | 12 July 2011 | PSOE | |
| Ministry of the Interior (Ministerio del Interior) | | Antonio Camacho | 12 July 2011 | 22 December 2011 | PSOE (Independent) | |
| Ministry of the Interior (Ministerio del Interior) | 16 April 2008 – 31 December 2011: (■) State Secretariat for Security; (■) Directorate-General of the Police and the Civil Guard; (■) General Secretariat for Penitentiary Institutions; (■) Directorate-General for Resource Management; (■) Directorate-General for Territorial Coordination and Open Environment; (■) Directorate-General for Security Infrastructure and Material (from 17 Jul 2008); (■) Directorate-General for International Relations and Foreigners; (■) Undersecretariat of the Interior; (■) Technical General Secretariat; (■) Directorate-General for Services (disest. 17 Jul 2008); (■) Directorate-General for Internal Policy; (■) Directorate-General for Traffic; (■) Directorate-General for Civil Protection and Emergencies; (■) Directorate-General for Security Infrastructure and Material (until 17 Jul 2008); (■) Directorate-General for Support to Victims of Terrorism; (■) Directorate-General for Personnel and Services (est. 17 Jul 2008; disest. 1 Jul 2010); (■) Directorate-General for Information and Social Relations (disest. 7 May 2010) | | | | | |
=== Ministry of Development ===
| Ministry of Development (Ministerio de Fomento) | | Magdalena Álvarez | 14 April 2008 | 7 April 2009 | PSOE | |
| Ministry of Development (Ministerio de Fomento) | | José Blanco | 7 April 2009 | 22 December 2011 | PSOE | |
| Ministry of Development (Ministerio de Fomento) | 16 April 2008 – 21 April 2009: (■) State Secretariat for Planning and Institutional Relations; (■) Directorate-General for Planning; (■) Directorate-General for Institutional Relations; (■) State Secretariat for Infrastructure; (■) General Secretariat for Infrastructure; (■) Directorate-General for Roads; (■) Directorate-General for Railways; (■) General Secretariat for Transport; (■) Directorate-General for Road Transport; (■) Directorate-General for the Merchant Marine; (■) Directorate-General for Civil Aviation; (■) Undersecretariat of Development; (■) Technical General Secretariat; (■) Directorate-General for Economic Programming; (■) Directorate-General of the National Geographic Institute; (■) Directorate-General for Services; 21 April 2009 – 19 January 2011: (■) State Secretariat for Planning and Infrastructure; (■) General Secretariat for Infrastructure; (■) Directorate-General for Roads; (■) Directorate-General for Railway Infrastructure; (■) Directorate-General for Planning (disest. 7 May 2010); (■) State Secretariat for Transport; (■) General Secretariat for Transport; (■) Directorate-General for Land Transport; (■) Directorate-General for the Merchant Marine; (■) Directorate-General for Civil Aviation; (■) State Secretariat for Housing and Urban Action (from 4 Nov 2010); (■) Directorate-General for Architecture and Housing Policy (from 4 Nov 2010); (■) Directorate-General for Soil and Urban Policies (from 4 Nov 2010); (■) General Secretariat for Institutional Relations and Coordination; (■) Directorate-General for Institutional Relations; (■) Directorate-General of the National Geographic Institute; (■) Undersecretariat of Development; (■) Technical General Secretariat; (■) Directorate-General for Economic Programming (disest. 30 Jun 2009); (■) Directorate-General for Economic Programming and Budgets (est. 30 Jun 2009); (■) Directorate-General for Services (disest. 7 May 2010); (■) Inspectorate-General of Development (est. 15 May 2010); 19 January – 31 December 2011: (■) State Secretariat for Planning and Infrastructure; (■) General Secretariat for Infrastructure; (■) Directorate-General for Roads; (■) Directorate-General for Railway Infrastructure; (■) State Secretariat for Transport; (■) General Secretariat for Transport; (■) Directorate-General for Land Transport; (■) Directorate-General for the Merchant Marine; (■) Directorate-General for Civil Aviation; (■) State Secretariat for Housing and Urban Action; (■) General Secretariat for Housing; (■) Directorate-General for Architecture and Housing Policy; (■) Directorate-General for Soil and Urban Policies; (■) General Secretariat for Institutional Relations and Coordination; (■) Directorate-General for Institutional Relations; (■) Directorate-General of the National Geographic Institute; (■) Undersecretariat of Development; (■) Technical General Secretariat; (■) Directorate-General for Economic Programming and Budgets; (■) Inspectorate-General of Development | | | | | |
=== Ministry of Education ===
| Ministry of Education, Social Policy and Sports (Ministerio de Educación, Política Social y Deporte) (until 7 April 2009) Ministry of Education (Ministerio de Educación) (from 7 April 2009) | | Mercedes Cabrera | 14 April 2008 | 7 April 2009 | PSOE (Independent) | |
| Ministry of Education, Social Policy and Sports (Ministerio de Educación, Política Social y Deporte) (until 7 April 2009) Ministry of Education (Ministerio de Educación) (from 7 April 2009) | | Ángel Gabilondo | 7 April 2009 | 22 December 2011 | PSOE (Independent) | |
| Ministry of Education, Social Policy and Sports (Ministerio de Educación, Política Social y Deporte) (until 7 April 2009) Ministry of Education (Ministerio de Educación) (from 7 April 2009) | 16 April 2008 – 21 April 2009: (■) State Secretariat for Education and Training; (■) Directorate-General for Educational System Planning (disest. 10 Jul 2008); (■) Directorate-General for Educational System Evaluation and Planning (est. 10 Jul 2008); (■) Directorate-General for Vocational Training; (■) Directorate-General for Territorial Evaluation and Cooperation (disest. 10 Jul 2008); (■) Directorate-General for Territorial Cooperation (est. 10 Jul 2008); (■) State Secretariat for Social Policy, Families and Dependency and Disability Care; (■) Directorate-General for Social Policy; (■) Directorate-General for Families and Children; (■) Directorate-General for Coordination of Sector Policies on Disability; (■) Undersecretariat of Education, Social Policy and Sports; (■) Technical General Secretariat; (●) High Council for Sports (until 7 Apr 2009); (■) President's Office of the High Council for Sports (until 7 Apr 2009); (■) Directorate-General for Sports (until 7 Apr 2009); (■) Directorate-General for Sports Infrastructure (until 7 Apr 2009); 21 April 2009 – 31 December 2011: (■) State Secretariat for Education and Vocational Training; (■) Directorate-General for Territorial Evaluation and Cooperation; (■) Directorate-General for Vocational Training; (■) General Secretariat for Universities; (■) Directorate-General for University Policy; (■) Directorate-General for University Training and Orientation (disest. 19 Feb 2011); (■) Directorate-General for University Modernization and Internationalization (disest. 7 Jul 2009); (■) General Secretariat of the University Coordination Council (disest. 7 Jul 2009); (■) Directorate-General for Services, Participation and Employability of University Students (est. 19 Feb 2011); (■) Undersecretariat of Education; (■) Technical General Secretariat; (■) Directorate-General for International Relations (est. 7 Jul 2009; disest. 1 Jul 2010) | | | | | |
=== Ministry of Labour and Immigration ===
| Ministry of Labour and Immigration (Ministerio de Trabajo e Inmigración) | | Celestino Corbacho | 14 April 2008 | 21 October 2010 | PSOE (PSC–PSOE) | |
| Ministry of Labour and Immigration (Ministerio de Trabajo e Inmigración) | | Valeriano Gómez | 21 October 2010 | 22 December 2011 | PSOE | |
| Ministry of Labour and Immigration (Ministerio de Trabajo e Inmigración) | 16 April 2008 – 4 November 2010: (■) State Secretariat for Social Security; (■) Directorate-General for Social Security Management; (■) Office of the Comptroller General of the Social Security; (■) State Secretariat for Immigration and Emigration; (■) Directorate-General for Immigration; (■) Directorate-General for Immigrant Integration; (■) Directorate-General for Emigration (disest. 10 Jul 2008); (■) Directorate-General for Spanish Citizenry Abroad (est. 10 Jul 2008); (■) Undersecretariat of Labour and Immigration; (■) Technical General Secretariat; (■) Directorate-General for Labour and Social Security Inspection; (■) Directorate-General for Services (disest. 7 May 2010); (■) General Secretariat for Employment; (■) Directorate-General for Labour; (■) Directorate-General for the Social Economy, Self-Employment and the European Social Fund (disest. 10 Jul 2008); (■) Directorate-General for the Social Economy, Self-Employment and Corporate Social Responsibility (est. 10 Jul 2008); (■) Cabinet for Social Dialogue (est. 5 Dec 2009); 4 November 2010 – 31 December 2011: (■) State Secretariat for Social Security; (■) Directorate-General for Social Security Management; (■) Office of the Comptroller General of the Social Security; (■) State Secretariat for Immigration and Emigration; (■) Directorate-General for Immigration; (■) Directorate-General for Immigrant Integration; (■) Directorate-General for Spanish Citizenry Abroad; (■) State Secretariat for Employment; (■) Directorate-General for Labour; (■) Directorate-General for the Social Economy, Self-Employment and Corporate Social Responsibility; (■) Undersecretariat of Labour and Immigration; (■) Technical General Secretariat; (■) Directorate-General for Labour and Social Security Inspection | | | | | |
=== Ministry of Industry, Tourism and Trade ===
| Ministry of Industry, Tourism and Trade (Ministerio de Industria, Turismo y Comercio) | | Miguel Sebastián | 14 April 2008 | 22 December 2011 | PSOE (Independent) | |
| Ministry of Industry, Tourism and Trade (Ministerio de Industria, Turismo y Comercio) | 16 April 2008 – 7 April 2009: (■) State Secretariat for Tourism; (■) State Secretariat for Trade; (■) General Secretariat for Foreign Trade; (■) Directorate-General for Trade and Investments; (■) Directorate-General for Trade Policy; (■) State Secretariat for Telecommunications and the Information Society; (■) Directorate-General for Telecommunications; (■) Directorate-General for the Development of the Information Society; (■) Undersecretariat of Industry, Tourism and Trade; (■) Technical General Secretariat; (■) General Secretariat for Industry; (■) Directorate-General for Industry; (■) Directorate-General for Small and Medium-sized Enterprises Policy; (■) General Secretariat for Energy; (■) Directorate-General for Energy Policy and Mines; 7 April 2009 – 28 July 2010: (■) State Secretariat for Tourism; (■) State Secretariat for Trade; (■) General Secretariat for Foreign Trade; (■) Directorate-General for Trade and Investments; (■) Directorate-General for Trade Policy; (■) State Secretariat for Telecommunications and the Information Society; (■) Directorate-General for Telecommunications; (■) Directorate-General for the Development of the Information Society (disest. 7 May 2010); (■) State Secretariat for Energy; (■) Directorate-General for Energy Policy and Mines; (■) Undersecretariat of Industry, Tourism and Trade; (■) Technical General Secretariat; (■) General Secretariat for Industry; (■) Directorate-General for Industry; (■) Directorate-General for Small and Medium-sized Enterprises Policy; 28 July 2010 – 31 December 2011: (■) State Secretariat for Foreign Trade; (■) Directorate-General for Trade and Investments; (■) State Secretariat for Telecommunications and the Information Society; (■) Directorate-General for Telecommunications and Information Technologies; (■) State Secretariat for Energy; (■) Directorate-General for Energy Policy and Mines; (■) Undersecretariat of Industry, Tourism and Trade; (■) Technical General Secretariat; (■) General Secretariat for Tourism and Internal Trade; (■) Directorate-General for Internal Trade; (■) General Secretariat for Industry; (■) Directorate-General for Industry; (■) Directorate-General for Small and Medium-sized Enterprises Policy | | | | | |
=== Ministry of Environment and Rural and Marine Affairs ===
| Ministry of Environment, and Rural and Marine Affairs (Ministerio de Medio Ambiente, y Medio Rural y Marino) | | Elena Espinosa | 14 April 2008 | 21 October 2010 | PSOE | |
| Ministry of Environment, and Rural and Marine Affairs (Ministerio de Medio Ambiente, y Medio Rural y Marino) | | Rosa Aguilar | 21 October 2010 | 22 December 2011 | PSOE (Independent) | |
| Ministry of Environment, and Rural and Marine Affairs (Ministerio de Medio Ambiente, y Medio Rural y Marino) | 16 April 2008 – 31 December 2011: (■) State Secretariat for Climate Change; (■) Spanish Office for Climate Change; (■) Directorate-General for Environmental Quality and Evaluation; (■) Directorate-General for Rural Environment and Forest Policy (from 4 Nov 2010); (■) Directorate-General for Sustainability of the Coast and the Sea (from 4 Nov 2010); (■) State Secretariat for Rural Environment and Water; (■) General Secretariat for Rural Environment; (■) Directorate-General for Rural Environment and Forest Policy (until 4 Nov 2010); (■) Directorate-General for Agricultural and Livestock Resources; (■) Directorate-General for Sustainable Development of the Rural Environment; (■) Directorate-General for Food Industry and Markets; (■) Directorate-General for Water; (■) Undersecretariat of Environment and Rural and Marine Affairs; (■) Technical General Secretariat; (■) Directorate-General for Services; (■) General Secretariat for Sea Affairs; (■) Directorate-General for Fisheries Management; (■) Directorate-General for Sustainability of the Coast and the Sea (until 4 Nov 2010); (■) Directorate-General for Fishery Resources and Aquaculture | | | | | |
=== Ministry of the Presidency ===
| Ministry of the Presidency (Ministerio de la Presidencia) | | Mª Teresa Fernández de la Vega | 14 April 2008 | 21 October 2010 | PSOE (Independent) | |
| Ministry of the Presidency (Ministerio de la Presidencia) | | Ramón Jáuregui | 21 October 2010 | 22 December 2011 | PSOE | |
| Ministry of the Presidency (Ministerio de la Presidencia) | 16 April 2008 – 21 April 2009: (■) State Secretariat for Constitutional and Parliamentary Affairs; (■) Directorate-General for Relations with the Cortes; (■) Directorate-General for Legal Coordination; (■) State Secretariat for Press; (■) Directorate-General for Information Coordination; (■) Directorate-General for National Information; (■) Directorate-General for International Information; (■) Undersecretariat of the Presidency; (■) Technical General Secretariat; (■) Directorate-General of the Government Secretariat; (■) Directorate-General for Human Resources, Services and Infrastructure; (■) Commissioner for the Zaragoza International Exhibition (disest. 31 Dec 2008); (■) Directorate-General for Information and Institutional Relations (disest. 31 Dec 2008); 21 April 2009 – 4 November 2010: (■) State Secretariat for Constitutional and Parliamentary Affairs; (■) Directorate-General for Relations with the Cortes; (■) Directorate-General for Legal Coordination; (■) State Secretariat for Press; (■) Directorate-General for Information Coordination; (■) Directorate-General for National Information; (■) Directorate-General for International Information; (■) State Secretariat for the Civil Service; (■) Directorate-General for the Civil Service; (■) Directorate-General for the Promotion of Electronic Administration; (■) Directorate-General for Administrative Organization and Procedures; (■) Undersecretariat of the Presidency; (■) Technical General Secretariat; (■) Directorate-General of the Government Secretariat (disest. 7 May 2010); (■) Directorate-General for Human Resources, Services and Infrastructure; (■) Directorate-General for Peripheral Administration Services (disest. 30 Jun 2009); (■) Directorate-General for the Coordination and Administration of Peripheral Services (est. 30 Jun 2009; disest. 19 Sep 2010); (■) Directorate-General for Coordination of the Peripheral State Administration (est. 19 Sep 2010); 4 November 2010 – 31 December 2011: (■) State Secretariat for Constitutional and Parliamentary Affairs; (■) Directorate-General for Relations with the Cortes; (■) Directorate-General for Legal Coordination; (■) State Secretariat for Press; (■) Directorate-General for Information Coordination; (■) Directorate-General for National Information; (■) Directorate-General for International Information; (■) Undersecretariat of the Presidency; (■) Technical General Secretariat; (■) Directorate-General for Human Resources, Services and Infrastructure | | | | | |
=== Ministry of Territorial Policy and Public Administration ===
| Ministry of Public Administrations (Ministerio de Administraciones; Públicas) (until 7 April 2009) Ministry of Territorial Policy (Ministerio de Política Territorial) (7 April 2009 – 21 October 2010) Ministry of Territorial Policy and Public Administration (Ministerio de Política Territorial y Administración Pública) (from 21 October 2010) | | Elena Salgado | 14 April 2008 | 7 April 2009 | PSOE (Independent) | |
| Ministry of Public Administrations (Ministerio de Administraciones; Públicas) (until 7 April 2009) Ministry of Territorial Policy (Ministerio de Política Territorial) (7 April 2009 – 21 October 2010) Ministry of Territorial Policy and Public Administration (Ministerio de Política Territorial y Administración Pública) (from 21 October 2010) | | Manuel Chaves | 7 April 2009 | 22 December 2011 | PSOE | |
| Ministry of Public Administrations (Ministerio de Administraciones; Públicas) (until 7 April 2009) Ministry of Territorial Policy (Ministerio de Política Territorial) (7 April 2009 – 21 October 2010) Ministry of Territorial Policy and Public Administration (Ministerio de Política Territorial y Administración Pública) (from 21 October 2010) | 16 April 2008 – 21 April 2009: (■) State Secretariat for Public Administration; (■) Directorate-General for the Civil Service; (■) Directorate-General for the Promotion of Electronic Administration; (■) Directorate-General for Administrative Organization and Procedures; (■) State Secretariat for Territorial Cooperation; (■) Directorate-General for Regional Cooperation; (■) Directorate-General for Regional Development; (■) Directorate-General for Local Cooperation; (■) Undersecretariat of Public Administrations; (■) Technical General Secretariat; (■) Directorate-General for Human Resources, Economic Programming and Peripheral Administration (disest. 10 Jul 2008); (■) Directorate-General for Services and Coordination of the General State Administration in the Autonomous Communities and Cities with Statute of Autonomy (est. 10 Jul 2008); 21 April 2009 – 4 November 2010: (■) State Secretariat for Territorial Cooperation; (■) Directorate-General for Regional Cooperation; (■) Directorate-General for Regional Development; (■) Directorate-General for Local Cooperation; (■) Undersecretariat of Territorial Policy; (■) Technical General Secretariat; (■) Directorate-General for Relations between the Peripheral State Administration and the Autonomous Communities and the Cities with Statute of Autonomy of Ceuta and Melilla (disest. 30 Jun 2009); (■) Directorate-General for Relations between the Peripheral State Administration and the Autonomous Communities and Cities with Statute of Autonomy and for Department Services (est. 30 Jun 2009); 4 November 2010 – 31 December 2011: (■) State Secretariat for Territorial Cooperation; (■) Directorate-General for Regional Cooperation; (■) Directorate-General for Regional Development; (■) Directorate-General for Local Cooperation; (■) State Secretariat for the Civil Service; (■) Directorate-General for the Civil Service; (■) Directorate-General for the Promotion of Electronic Administration; (■) Directorate-General for Administrative Organization and Procedures; (■) Undersecretariat of Territorial Policy and Public Administration; (■) Technical General Secretariat; (■) Directorate-General for Institutional Relations and Organization; (■) Directorate-General for Coordination of the Peripheral State Administration | | | | | |
=== Ministry of Culture ===
| Ministry of Culture (Ministerio de Cultura) | | César Antonio Molina | 14 April 2008 | 7 April 2009 | PSOE (Independent) | |
| Ministry of Culture (Ministerio de Cultura) | | Ángeles González-Sinde | 7 April 2009 | 22 December 2011 | PSOE (Independent) | |
| Ministry of Culture (Ministerio de Cultura) | 16 April 2008 – 31 December 2011: (■) Undersecretariat of Culture; (■) Technical General Secretariat; (■) Directorate-General for Cultural Policy and Industries; (■) Directorate-General for Fine Arts and Cultural Property; (■) Directorate-General for Books, Archives and Libraries | | | | | |
=== Ministry of Health ===
| Ministry of Health and Consumer Affairs (Ministerio de Sanidad y Consumo) (until 7 April 2009) Ministry of Health and Social Policy (Ministerio de Sanidad y Política Social) (7 April 2009 – 21 October 2010) Ministry of Health, Social Policy and Equality (Ministerio de Sanidad, Política Social e Igualdad) (from 21 October 2010) | | Bernat Soria | 14 April 2008 | 7 April 2009 | PSOE (Independent) | |
| Ministry of Health and Consumer Affairs (Ministerio de Sanidad y Consumo) (until 7 April 2009) Ministry of Health and Social Policy (Ministerio de Sanidad y Política Social) (7 April 2009 – 21 October 2010) Ministry of Health, Social Policy and Equality (Ministerio de Sanidad, Política Social e Igualdad) (from 21 October 2010) | | Trinidad Jiménez | 7 April 2009 | 21 October 2010 | PSOE | |
| Ministry of Health and Consumer Affairs (Ministerio de Sanidad y Consumo) (until 7 April 2009) Ministry of Health and Social Policy (Ministerio de Sanidad y Política Social) (7 April 2009 – 21 October 2010) Ministry of Health, Social Policy and Equality (Ministerio de Sanidad, Política Social e Igualdad) (from 21 October 2010) | | Leire Pajín | 21 October 2010 | 22 December 2011 | PSOE | |
| Ministry of Health and Consumer Affairs (Ministerio de Sanidad y Consumo) (until 7 April 2009) Ministry of Health and Social Policy (Ministerio de Sanidad y Política Social) (7 April 2009 – 21 October 2010) Ministry of Health, Social Policy and Equality (Ministerio de Sanidad, Política Social e Igualdad) (from 21 October 2010) | 16 April – 9 July 2008: (■) Undersecretariat of Health and Consumer Affairs; (■) Technical General Secretariat; (■) Directorate-General for Pharmacy and Health Products; (■) Directorate-General for Human Resources and Economic-Budgetary Services; (■) Directorate-General for Consumer Affairs and Citizen Services; (■) General Secretariat for Health; (■) Directorate-General for Public Health; (■) Directorate-General for Cohesion of the National Health System and High Inspection; (■) National Health System Quality Agency; (■) Government Delegation for the National Plan on Drugs; 9 July 2008 – 21 April 2009: (■) Undersecretariat of Health and Consumer Affairs; (■) Technical General Secretariat; (■) Directorate-General for Human Resources and Economic-Budgetary Services; (■) Directorate-General for Consumer Affairs; (■) General Secretariat for Health; (■) Directorate-General for Public Health and Foreign Health Affairs; (■) Directorate-General for Professional Planning, Cohesion of the National Health System and High Inspection; (■) Government Delegation for the National Plan on Drugs; (■) Directorate-General for Pharmacy and Health Products; (■) National Health System Quality Agency; (■) Directorate-General for Advanced Therapies and Transplants; 21 April 2009 – 4 November 2010: (■) Undersecretariat of Health and Social Policy; (■) Technical General Secretariat; (■) Directorate-General for Human Resources and Economic-Budgetary Services (disest. 7 May 2010); (■) General Secretariat for Health; (■) Directorate-General for Public Health and Foreign Health Affairs; (■) Directorate-General for Professional Planning, Cohesion of the National Health System and High Inspection; (■) Directorate-General for Pharmacy and Health Products; (■) Directorate-General for Advanced Therapies and Transplants (disest. 7 May 2010); (■) National Health System Quality Agency; (■) General Secretariat for Social Policy (until 30 Jun 2009) / General Secretariat for Social Policy and Consumer Affairs (from 30 Jun 2009); (■) Directorate-General for Social Policy, Families and Children; (■) Directorate-General for Coordination of Sector Policies on Disability; (■) Government Delegation for the National Plan on Drugs; (■) Directorate-General for Consumer Affairs; 4 November 2010 – 31 December 2011: (■) State Secretariat for Equality; (■) Government Delegation for Gender Violence; (■) Directorate-General for Equality in Employment and against Discrimination; (■) Undersecretariat of Health, Social Policy and Equality; (■) Technical General Secretariat; (■) General Secretariat for Health; (■) Directorate-General for Public Health and Foreign Health Affairs; (■) Directorate-General for Professional Planning, Cohesion of the National Health System and High Inspection; (■) Directorate-General for Pharmacy and Health Products; (■) National Health System Quality Agency; (■) General Secretariat for Social Policy and Consumer Affairs; (■) Directorate-General for Social Policy, Families and Children; (■) Directorate-General for Coordination of Sector Policies on Disability; (■) Government Delegation for the National Plan on Drugs; (■) Directorate-General for Consumer Affairs | | | | | |
=== Ministry of Housing ===
| Ministry of Housing (Ministerio de Vivienda) (until 21 October 2010) | | Beatriz Corredor | 14 April 2008 | 21 October 2010 | PSOE | |
| Ministry of Housing (Ministerio de Vivienda) (until 21 October 2010) | 16 April 2008 – 4 November 2010: (■) Undersecretariat of Housing; (■) Technical General Secretariat; (■) General Secretariat for Housing; (■) Directorate-General for Architecture and Housing Policy; (■) Directorate-General for Urbanism and Soil Policy (disest. 10 Jul 2008); (■) Directorate-General for Soil and Urban Policies (est. 10 Jul 2008) | | | | | |
=== Ministry of Science and Innovation ===
| Ministry of Science and Innovation (Ministerio de Ciencia e Innovación) | | Cristina Garmendia | 14 April 2008 | 22 December 2011 | PSOE (Independent) | |
| Ministry of Science and Innovation (Ministerio de Ciencia e Innovación) | 16 April 2008 – 21 April 2009: (■) State Secretariat for Universities; (■) Directorate-General for Universities; (■) Directorate-General for Programs and Knowledge Transfers; (■) General Secretariat of the University Coordination Council; (■) State Secretariat for Research; (■) General Secretariat for Scientific and Technological Policy; (■) Directorate-General for Planning and Coordination (from 16 Jul 2008); (■) Directorate-General for Planning and Coordination (until 16 Jul 2008); (■) Directorate-General for International Cooperation; (■) Undersecretariat of Science and Innovation; (■) Technical General Secretariat; 21 April 2009 – 31 December 2011: (■) State Secretariat for Research; (■) Directorate-General for Research and Management of the National Plan for RDI; (■) Directorate-General for International Cooperation and Institutional Relations; (■) General Secretariat for Innovation; (■) Directorate-General for Technology Transfer and Enterprise Development; (■) Undersecretariat of Science and Innovation; (■) Technical General Secretariat | | | | | |
=== Ministry of Equality ===
| Ministry of Equality (Ministerio de Igualdad) (until 21 October 2010) | | Bibiana Aído | 14 April 2008 | 21 October 2010 | PSOE | |
| Ministry of Equality (Ministerio de Igualdad) (until 21 October 2010) | 16 April 2008 – 4 November 2010: (■) Undersecretariat of Equality; (■) Technical General Secretariat; (■) General Secretariat for Equality Policies; (■) Government Delegation for Gender Violence; (■) Directorate-General for Equality in Employment (disest. 7 May 2010); (■) Directorate-General against Discrimination (disest. 7 May 2010); (■) Directorate-General for Equality in Employment and against Discrimination (est. 7 May 2010) | | | | | |
=== Spokesperson of the Government ===
| Spokesperson of the Government (Portavoz del Gobierno) | | Mª Teresa Fernández de la Vega | 14 April 2008 | 21 October 2010 | PSOE (Independent) | |
| Spokesperson of the Government (Portavoz del Gobierno) | | Alfredo Pérez Rubalcaba | 21 October 2010 | 12 July 2011 | PSOE | |
| Spokesperson of the Government (Portavoz del Gobierno) | | José Blanco | 12 July 2011 | 22 December 2011 | PSOE | |

== Notes ==
| Preceded by Zapatero I | Government of Spain; 2008–2011 | Succeeded by Rajoy I |
