= Jorge Fernández Díaz =

Spanish politician (born 1950)

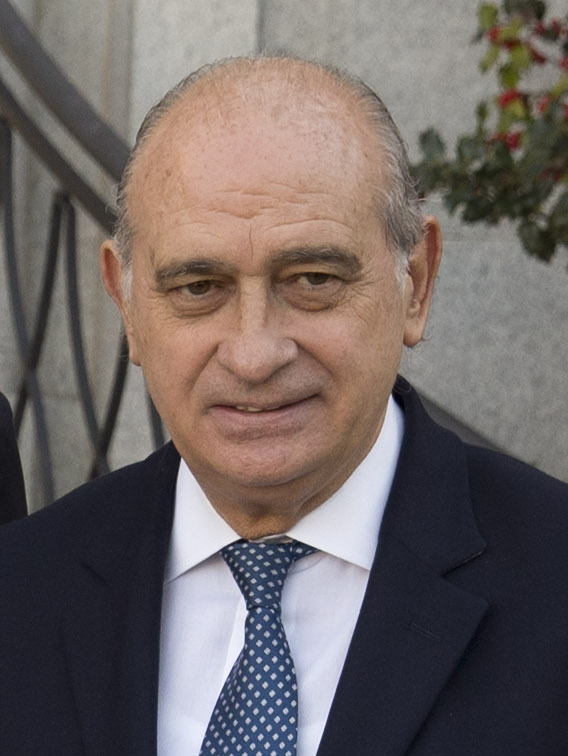

Minister of the Interior
- In office 22 December 2011 – 4 November 2016
- Monarchs: Juan Carlos I (2011–2014); Felipe VI (2014–2016)
- Prime Minister: Mariano Rajoy
- Preceded by: Antonio Camacho Vizcaíno
- Succeeded by: Juan Ignacio Zoido

Member of the Congress of Deputies
- In office 28 October 1989 – 21 May 2019
- Constituency: Barcelona

Member of the Parliament of Catalonia for the Province of Barcelona
- In office 29 April 1984 – 28 October 1989

Personal details
- Born: 6 April 1950 (age 76) Valladolid, Spain
- Party: Partido Popular
- Education: Technical University College of Barcelona

Jorge Fernández Díaz (born 6 April 1950) is a Spanish politician and a member of the Partido Popular (PP).

== Early life and education ==
Born on 6 April 1950 in Valladolid, he was the son of a military officer and Deputy Inspector-Chief of the Barcelona's Urban Guard in Francoist Spain, and the second of ten children. He moved to Barcelona at the age of 3 and studied industrial engineering at the Technical University College of Barcelona. He is the older brother of Alberto Fernández Díaz, a former PP leader in Catalonia. Jorge holds an industrial engineering degree. He was the chairman of the Catalan PP from 1989 to 1991 and under-minister from 1996 to 2004. He is also a member of Opus Dei.

== Career ==
Díaz started his career working as an engineer and civil servant. He is a member of the People's Party and has been a member of the Spanish parliament since 1989. In 1983, he became the elected leader of Alianza Popular's Barcelona regional branch. The following year Díaz began to serve as a deputy in the Catalan Parliament for Alianza Popular. From 1986 to 1989 he was also a senator. In 1988 he was again elected to the Catalan Parliament, but for the newly founded People's Party. In 1989 he left regional political offices and he was elected to the congress of deputies as a representative of Barcelona in the 1989 general elections. He served as secretary of state in all cabinets headed by José María Aznar. From 2008 to 2011 he was one of the vice presidents of congress. He was the top candidate on the party's Barcelona list in the November 2011 general election.

Díaz was appointed minister of interior to the cabinet led by prime minister Mariano Rajoy in December 2011.

On 21 June 2016, five days before the general elections, as head of list of PP by Barcelona, he was involved in a conspiracy case against the parties of the independence of Catalonia to create corruption scandals that he, with the head of Office Against Corruption of Catalonia, had manipulated. He said that the Prime Minister, Mariano Rajoy, and leader of the Popular Party, knew the fact.

Often he was criticized by numerous political persecution against political parties as Podemos, whose complaints have been filed without any importance.

== Views ==
Díaz is a conservative and religious politician. In March 2013, Díaz argued that the law on redefining traditional marriage is not acceptable due to religious concerns but due to rational concerns.

He is a supernumerary member of the Opus Dei.

Political offices
Preceded by Antonio Camacho Vizcaíno	Minister of the Interior; 2011–2016	Succeeded by Juan Ignacio Zoido
