= Alfredo Pérez Rubalcaba =

Spanish politician (1951–2019)

The Most Excellent Alfredo Pérez Rubalcaba
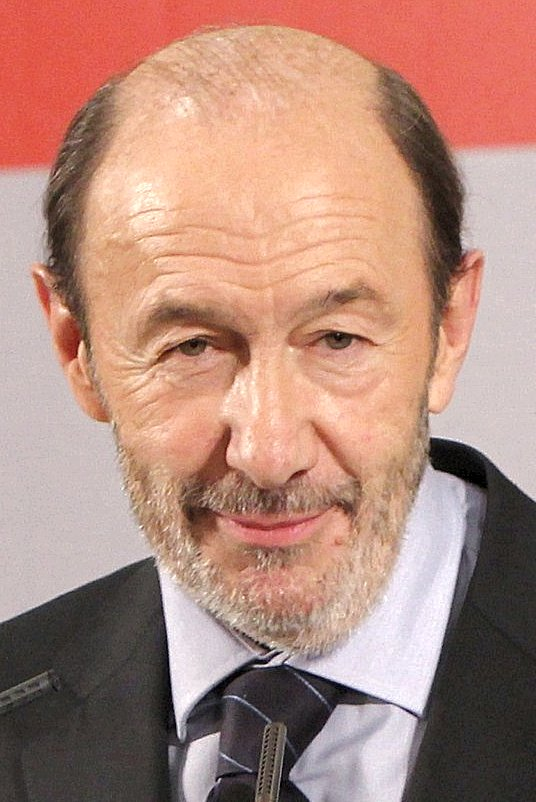
- Rubalcaba in 2012

Leader of the Opposition
- In office 21 December 2011 – 26 July 2014
- Monarchs: Juan Carlos I Felipe VI
- Prime Minister: Mariano Rajoy
- Preceded by: Mariano Rajoy
- Succeeded by: Pedro Sánchez

Secretary-General of the Spanish Socialist Workers' Party
- In office 4 February 2012 – 26 July 2014
- President: José Antonio Griñán
- Deputy: Elena Valenciano
- Preceded by: José Luis Rodríguez Zapatero
- Succeeded by: Pedro Sánchez
Other offices held
First Deputy Prime Minister of Spain
In office 21 October 2010 – 12 July 2011
Prime Minister	José Luis Rodríguez Zapatero
Preceded by	María Teresa Fernández de la Vega
Succeeded by	Elena Salgado
Spokesperson of the Government
In office 21 October 2010 – 12 July 2011
Prime Minister	José Luis Rodríguez Zapatero
Preceded by	María Teresa Fernández de la Vega
Succeeded by	José Blanco López
In office 13 July 1993 – 5 May 1996
Prime Minister	Felipe González
Preceded by	Virgilio Zapatero Gómez
Succeeded by	Miguel Ángel Rodríguez Bajón
Minister of the Interior
In office 11 April 2006 – 12 July 2011
Prime Minister	José Luis Rodríguez Zapatero
Preceded by	José Antonio Alonso
Succeeded by	Antonio Camacho Vizcaíno
Minister of Defence
Acting; 20 May 2008 – 30 June 2008
Prime Minister	José Luis Rodríguez Zapatero
Preceded by	Carme Chacón
Succeeded by	Carme Chacón
Leader of the Socialist Parliamentary Group in the Congress of Deputies
In office 14 March 2004 – 11 April 2006
Preceded by	Jesús Caldera
Succeeded by	Diego López Garrido
Minister of the Presidency Secretary of the Council of Ministers
In office 13 July 1993 – 6 May 1996
Prime Minister	Felipe González
Preceded by	Virgilio Zapatero Gómez
Succeeded by	Francisco Álvarez Cascos
Minister of Education and Science
In office 24 June 1992 – 12 July 1993
Prime Minister	Felipe González
Preceded by	Javier Solana
Succeeded by	Gustavo Suárez Pertierra
Member of the Congress of Deputies
In office 5 December 2011 – 2 September 2014
Constituency	Madrid
In office 24 March 2008 – 5 December 2011
Constituency	Cádiz
In office 31 March 2004 – 24 March 2008
Constituency	Cantabria
In office 26 March 1996 – 31 March 2004
Constituency	Madrid
In office 24 June 1993 – 26 March 1996
Constituency	Toledo

Personal details
- Born: 28 July 1951 Solares, Cantabria, Spain
- Died: 10 May 2019 (aged 67) Majadahonda, Community of Madrid, Spain
- Cause of death: Stroke
- Party: PSOE
- Spouse: Pilar Goya (m. 1979)
- Education: Complutense University of Madrid Lic., PhD

Alfredo Pérez Rubalcaba (Spanish pronunciation: [alˈfɾeðo ˈpeɾeθ ruβalˈkaβa]; 28 July 1951 – 10 May 2019) was a Spanish statesman, politician and chemist who served as Deputy Prime Minister of Spain from 2010 to 2011, and previously as Minister of Education from 1992 to 1993, as Minister of the Presidency from 1993 to 1996, as Minister of the Interior from 2006 to 2011 and as acting Minister of Defence between May and June 2008.

He also served as Leader of the Opposition from 2011 to 2014 and as Secretary-General of the Spanish Socialist Workers' Party (PSOE) from 2012 to 2014. He obtained a PhD in Organic Chemistry at the Complutense University of Madrid.

== Biography ==
=== Early life and academic career ===
He was born in the village of Solares, in the Medio Cudeyo municipality, Santander province. He moved aged 3 to Salamanca, Madrid, with his family and studied at the Colegio del Pilar. His father was an Iberia pilot, and his grandfather was a Republican captain. He joined the PSOE in 1974, and, being a keen athlete at school, ran the 100 metres in 10.9 seconds at the national championships. He married chemist Pilar Goya, a childhood friend with whom he reconnected at university. He achieved a chemistry doctorate at the Complutense University of Madrid, and in his previous academic career, he became a senior lecturer in organic chemistry in 1984. He also worked at the University of Konstanz and the University of Montpellier, where his main contributions to the scientific field were his studies on reaction mechanisms.

Rubalcaba's early involvement in politics began in the wake of the murder of fellow Colegio del Pilar alumni Enrique Ruano by the Francoist secret police.

He spoke fluent Spanish, English and French, and had a working knowledge of German from his time lecturing at Konstanz.

He represented Toledo in Congress from 1993 to 1996, Madrid from 1996 until 2004, Cantabria from 2004 to 2008 and, despite not being Andalusian, was put forward for the safe parliamentary seat of Cádiz in the 2008 election, which he won.

=== González cabinet ===
With Felipe González's election win in 1982, Rubalcaba took on various posts in the Education Ministry, including Director of the Technical Cabinet for the Secretary of State for Universities and Investigation.

Rubalcaba was appointed Secretary of State for Education in 1986 and in 1992 he was promoted to Minister of Education and Science by Prime Minister Felipe González. After the 1993 general election he was appointed Minister of the Presidency and Relations with the Cortes and Spokesperson of the Government until 1996 when his party lost the general election. He was re-elected as the representative for Madrid. As a Minister he had to face the accusations that involved the government of Felipe González with the GAL paramilitary group, as well as to use his negotiation skills to get both parties around the table when neither party co-operated.

=== Spell in opposition ===
In 1997, Rubalcaba was appointed as a member of the PSOE executive, and his inclusion was seen as a sign of his role to play in the next era outside of government. His bipartisanship made him one of the main Congress figures keeping in touch with ETA following a truce agreed in 1999. When José Luis Rodríguez Zapatero was elected leader in 2000, Rubalcaba joined the party's federal committee, playing a key role in the party's road map back to government. He brought the PSOE and PP together in December 2000 to agree to work with each other to fight against ETA.

=== Interior minister and deputy prime minister ===
For the 2004 Spanish general election, Rubalcaba was responsible for the electoral strategy of the PSOE. Some political analysts attribute him a decisive role in the socialist victory.

After the investiture of the Cortes Generales, Pérez Rubalcaba was appointed Leader of the Socialist Group in the Congress of Deputies. On 11 April 2006 he replaced José Antonio Alonso as head of the Ministry of the Interior. It was in this ministry where he gained popularity within his party, thanks, among other measures, to the change of direction in the fight against terrorism that led to the end of the violence of ETA. However, several media and political parties accused Rubalcaba of being involved in the Faisán case, about an extortion network of ETA, a fact that has not been verified.

After the socialist victory in the general elections of 2008, Pérez Rubalcaba kept his ministerial portfolio, remaining Interior Minister during the IX Legislature. Between 20 May and 30 June 2008 he assumed the duties of Minister of Defence temporarily when Carme Chacón was on maternity leave, combining these functions with his work as Interior Minister.

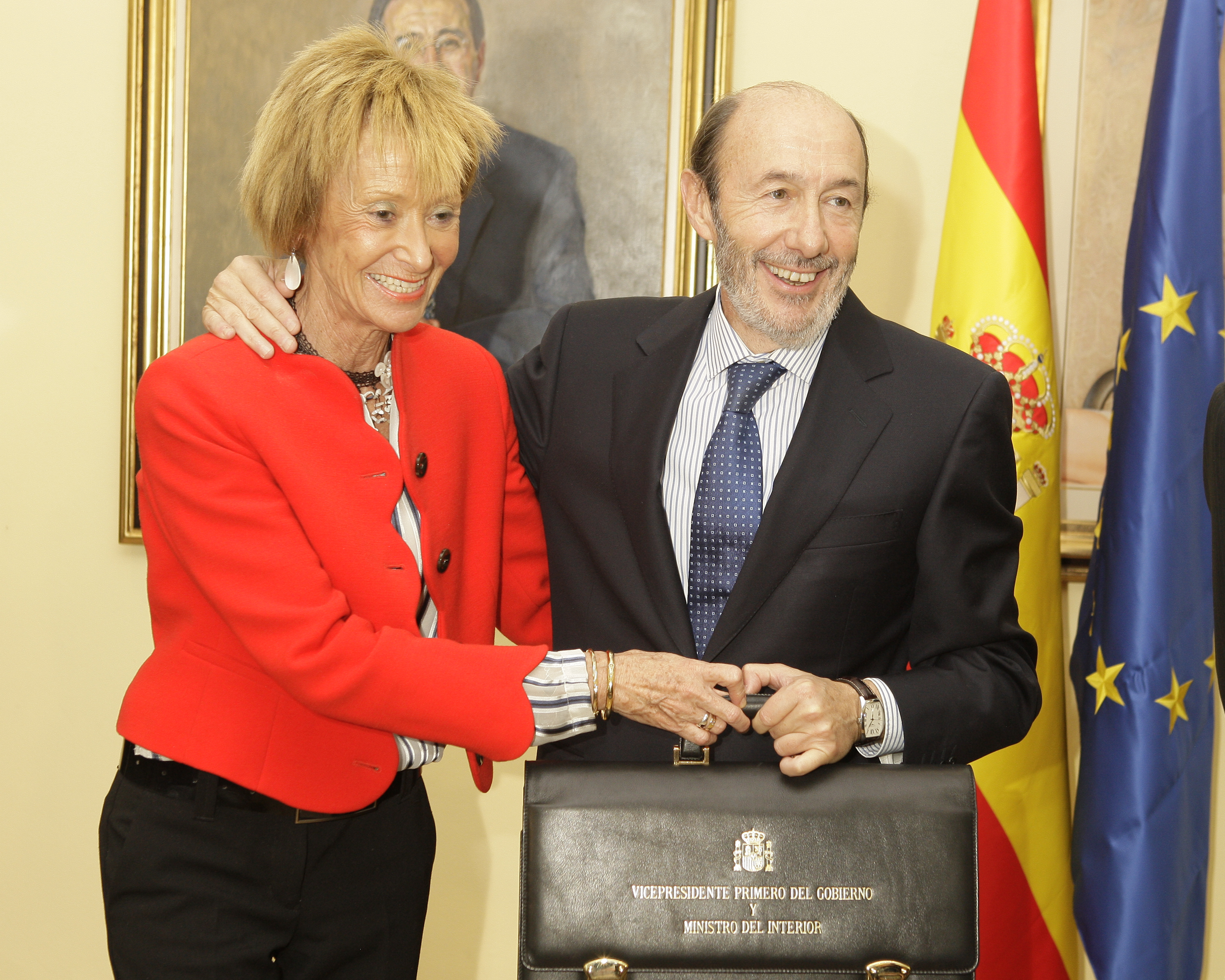
Rubalcaba succeeding Fernández de la Vega

On 21 October 2010 he replaced María Teresa Fernández de la Vega as Deputy Prime Minister and Spokesperson of the Government, combining this with his responsibilities as head of the Interior portfolio.

On 10 January 2011, ETA declared that their September 2010 ceasefire would be permanent and verifiable by international observers. On 20 October 2011, the Basque terrorist group, after 43 years of activity and more than 800 deaths in Spain, announced its definitive cessation of violence.

As minister he also had to face the high accident rate on Spanish roads. His attempts to solve it were the most successful in history in reducing the number of fatalities, and became a benchmark at European level.

=== Premiership candidate ===
As it became increasingly likely that Zapatero was not going to seek re-election, Rubalcaba became the favourite to succeed him, with Carme Chacón as his only rival in the primaries. Nevertheless, in May 2011, Chacón announced that she was withdrawing from the race, and in June Rubalcaba was chosen unopposed as the PSOE's candidate for Prime Minister at the 2011 general election. On 8 July 2011, he resigned from his duties in the government in order to focus on the election campaign. The PSOE lost the 2011 elections in a landslide, getting the worst results in PSOE's history. Later studies, however, suggested that Zapatero's second government and its handling of the Great Recession turned off potential voters more than Rubalcaba as a potential Prime Minister.

He applied to succeed José Luis Rodríguez Zapatero as PSOE's General Secretary and won the vote, held on 6 February 2012. He received 487 votes against 465 for Carme Chacón.

=== Resignation and later life ===
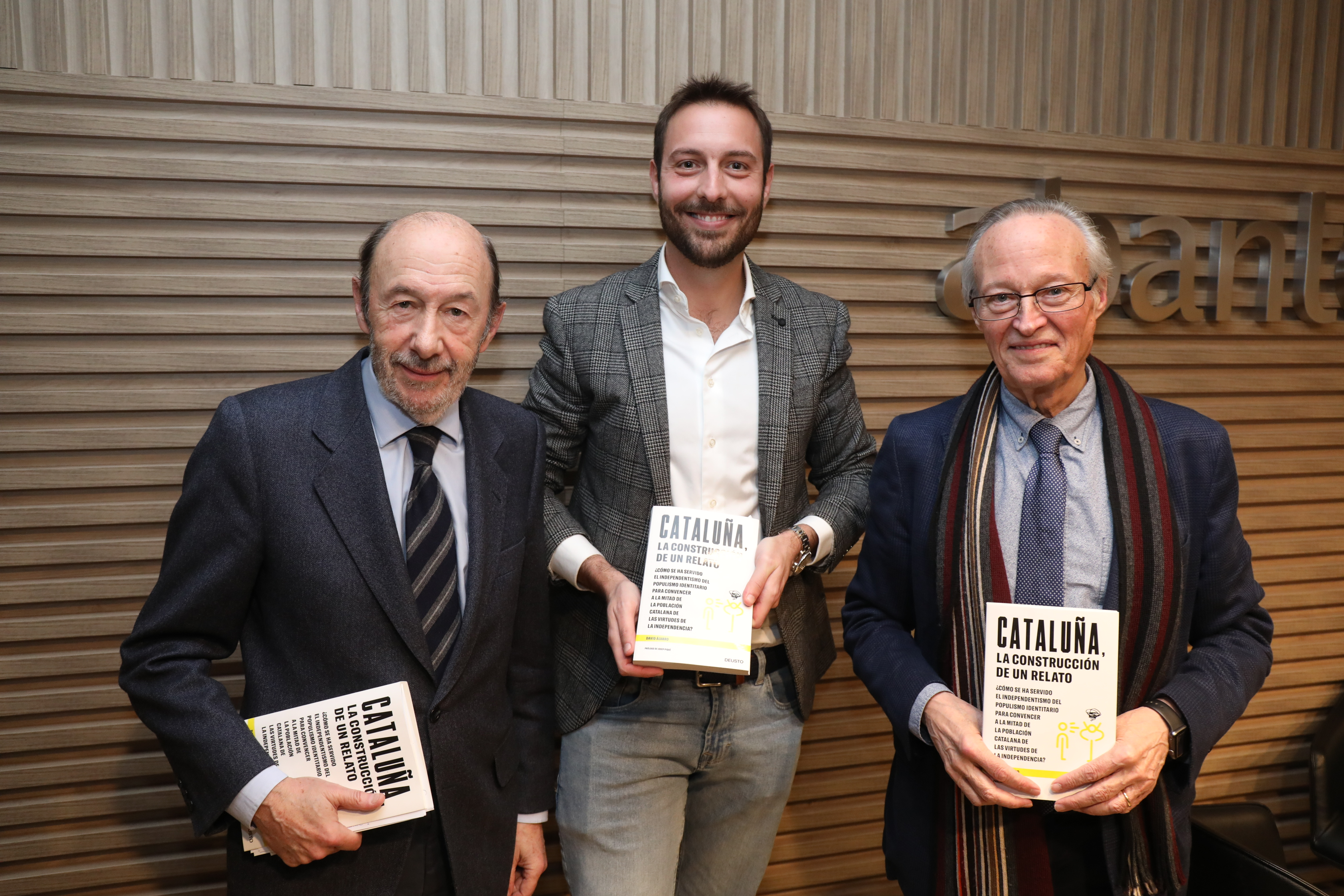
Rubalcaba in January 2019 with Josep Piqué (right)

Due to the bad results of the party in the 2014 European Parliament election, Rubalcaba resigned on 26 May 2014. He delayed his resignation for a few months to ensure his party voted 'yes' to Juan Carlos I's abdication. After a leadership election, Rubalcaba was succeeded by the newly elected Secretary General Pedro Sánchez on 13 July 2014.

In September 2016 it was announced that Pérez Rubalcaba would return to his position as Chemistry professor at the Complutense University of Madrid. He also joined the editorial board of El País, of which he was part until July 2018.

Rubalcaba's successor Pedro Sánchez offered him the chance to run as PSOE candidate for the Mayor of Madrid in the 2019 Madrid City Council election, but he declined.

== Death ==
Rubalcaba was admitted to the Puerta de Hierro Hospital, in Majadahonda, on 8 May 2019 when he had suffered a severe stroke after teaching in the university. He died two days later, aged 67. The PSOE cancelled all the acts of the first day of the campaign for local elections. He had a funeral with state honours at the Congress of Deputies.

On 3 November 2020, Interior Minister Fernando Grande-Marlaska announced that he would posthumously award Rubalcaba with the police force's highest honours, to commemorate his work against organised crime and terrorism, in particular against ETA during Zapatero's government. In February 2025, the minister also granted him the Grand Cross of the Order of Merit for Security.

Political offices
Preceded by Joaquín Arango	Secretary of State for Education; 1986–1992	Succeeded by Álvaro Marchesi
Preceded by Javier Solana	Minister of Education and Science; 1992–1993	Succeeded by Gustavo Suárez Pertierra
Preceded by Virgilio Zapatero Gómez	Minister of the Presidency; 1993–1996	Succeeded by Francisco Álvarez Cascos
Preceded by José Antonio Alonso	Minister of the Interior; 2006–2011	Succeeded by Antonio Camacho Vizcaino
Preceded by María Teresa Fernández de la Vega	First Deputy Prime Minister of Spain; 2010–2011	Succeeded by Elena Salgado
Preceded by Mariano Rajoy	Leader of the Opposition; 2011–2014	Succeeded by Pedro Sánchez
Party political offices
Preceded by Jesús Caldera	Leader of the Socialist Parliamentary Group in the Congress of Deputies; 2004–2006	Succeeded by Diego López Garrido
Preceded by José Luis Rodríguez Zapatero	Secretary-General of the Spanish Socialist Workers' Party; 2012–2014	Succeeded by Pedro Sánchez
