= Government of José Luis Rodríguez Zapatero =

Government of José Luis Rodríguez Zapatero may refer to:

- First government of José Luis Rodríguez Zapatero (2004–2008)
- Second government of José Luis Rodríguez Zapatero (2008–2011)
