= José Antonio Alonso =

Spanish politician

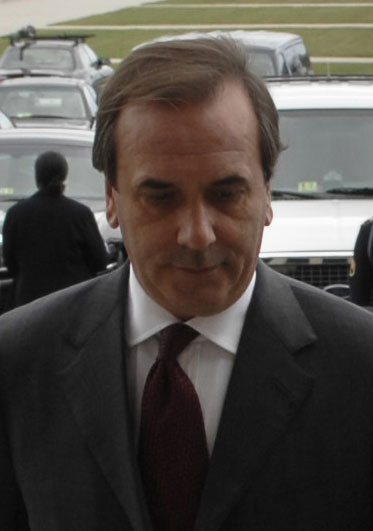
- José Antonio Alonso, 2006

Minister of the Interior
- In office 18 April 2004 – 7 April 2006
- Prime Minister: José Luis Rodríguez Zapatero
- Preceded by: Ángel Acebes
- Succeeded by: Alfredo Pérez Rubalcaba

Minister of Defense
- In office 7 April 2006 – 11 April 2008
- Prime Minister: José Luis Rodríguez Zapatero
- Preceded by: José Bono
- Succeeded by: Carme Chacón

Member of the Spanish Congress of Deputies
- In office 2004–2011
- Constituency: León

Personal details
- Born: José Antonio Alonso Suárez; 28 March 1960 León, Spain
- Died: 2 February 2017 (aged 56) Madrid, Spain
- Party: PSOE
- Education: University of León
- Occupation: Judge, politician

José Antonio Alonso Suárez (28 March 1960 – 2 February 2017) was a Spanish judge and politician, member of the Spanish Socialist Workers' Party (PSOE). He was member of the Spanish Cabinet from 2004 to 2008.

Born in León, he was a jurist (judge since 1985 after graduating from the University of Leon, magistrate 1989 and criminal court judge with the provincial court in Madrid) and academic at the law faculty of the University of Leon before his political career, Alonso was elected to the Spanish Congress as a member of the Spanish Socialist Workers' Party in 2004, representing León Province and was re-elected in 2008. He later served as spokesman for the PSOE Parliamentary Group.

From 18 April 2004 to 7 April 2006 he was the Minister of the Interior in the government of José Luis Rodríguez Zapatero. Described by his ministerial colleagues as a man "driven by his strong ideological beliefs and professionalism", Zapatero is said to have chosen Alonso on the grounds that the latter would fight terrorism without compromising human rights. Alonso served as the Minister of Defense until 11 April 2008. Prior to his election he had been a critic of the People's Party's support for George W. Bush and their alleged politicisation of judicial bodies.

Alonso died from lung cancer in Madrid on 2 February 2017 at the age of 56.

Political offices
| Preceded by Ángel Acebes | Minister of the Interior; 2004–2006 | Succeeded by Alfredo Pérez Rubalcaba |
| Preceded by José Bono | Minister of Defence; 2006–2008 | Succeeded by Carme Chacón |
Party political offices
| Preceded by Diego López Garrido | Leader of the Socialist Group in the Congress of Deputies; 2008–2012 | Succeeded by Soraya Rodríguez |
