= Beatriz Corredor =

Spanish lawyer and politician

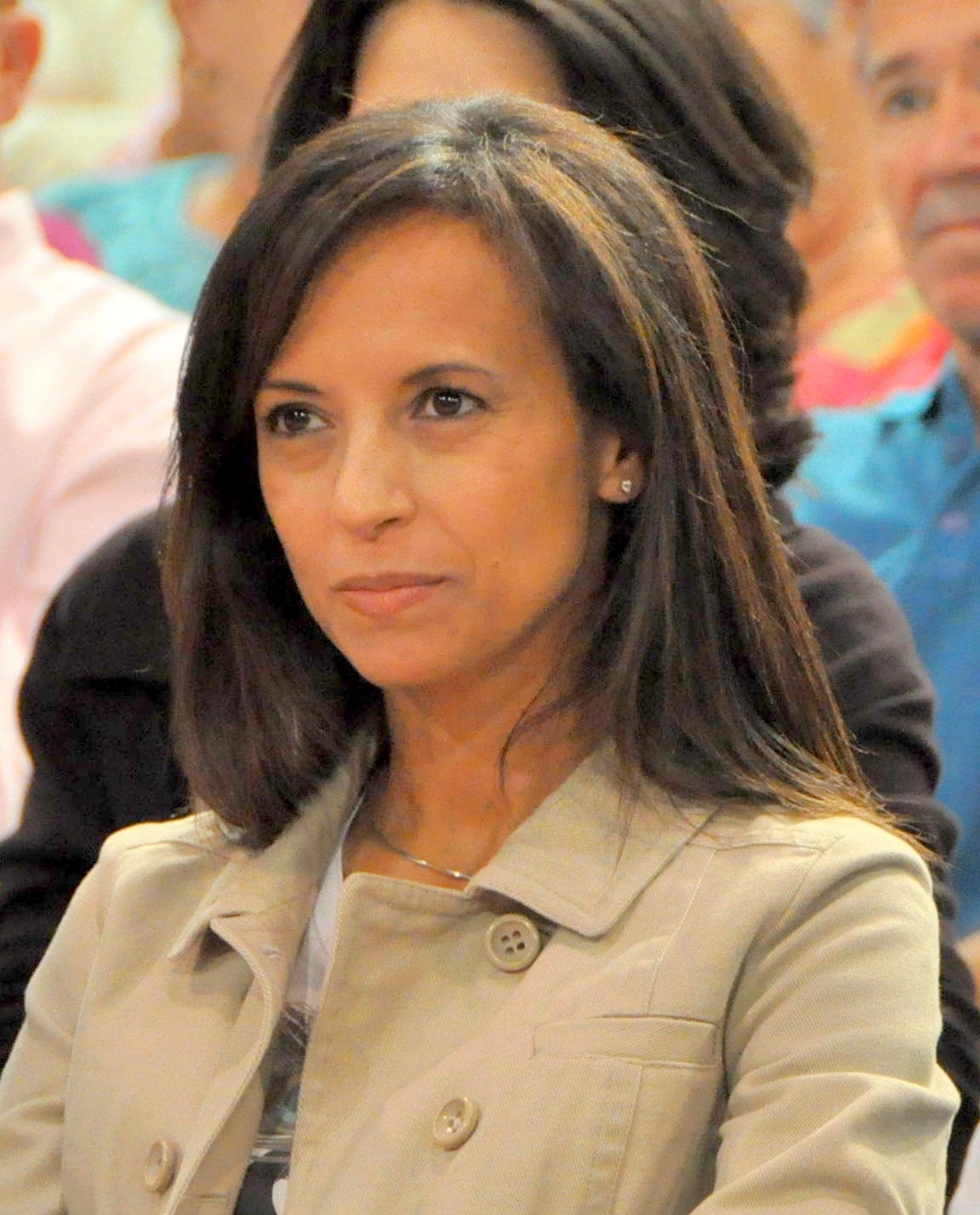
- Beatriz Corredor (2010)

Minister of Housing of Spain
- In office 14 April 2008 – 20 October 2010
- Prime Minister: José Luis Rodríguez Zapatero
- Preceded by: José Blanco (integration with Ministry of Public Works and Transport)
- Succeeded by: Office abolished (Later: Isabel Rodríguez García

Personal details
- Born: Beatriz Corredor Sierra; 1 July 1968 (age 57) Madrid, Spain
- Party: PSOE

Beatriz Corredor Sierra (born 1 July 1968) is a Spanish lawyer and politician. From April 2008 to October 2010 she served as Spain's Minister of Housing. She served as member of the Congress of Deputies from May 2019 to January 2020. She chaired the Pablo Iglesias Foundation, a non-profit organization named after the Spanish Socialist Workers' Party (PSOE) founder Pablo Iglesias Posse.

Since February 2020, she is president of Spain's electricity grid operator, Red Eléctrica de España (REE).

Preceded by Carme Chacón	Minister of Housing of Spain; 2007 - 2008	Succeeded by José Blanco (integration with Ministry of Public Works and Transport)
