= Trinidad Jiménez =

Spanish politician and diplomat

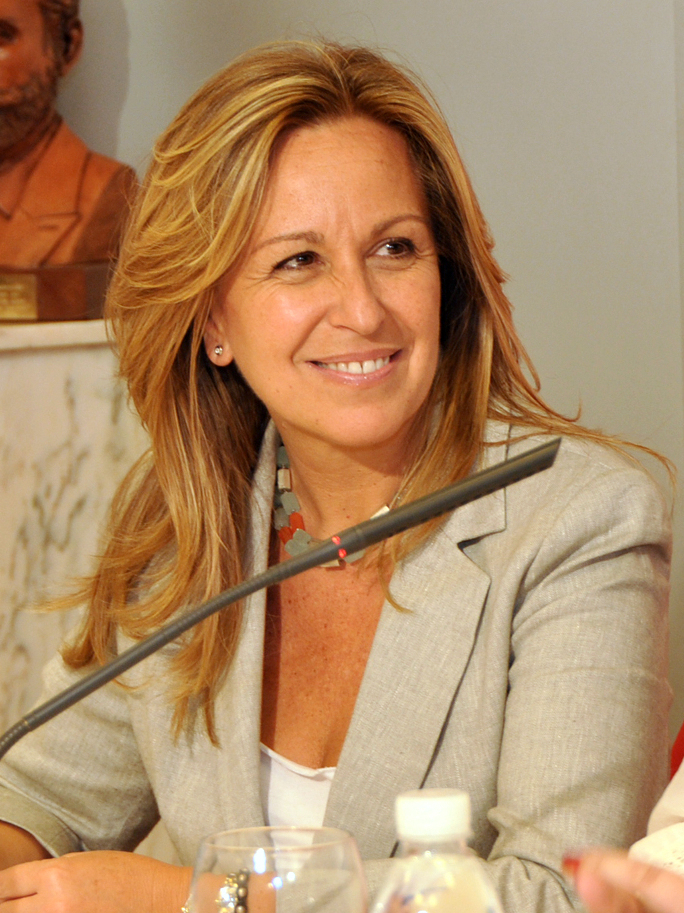

Minister of Foreign Affairs and Cooperation
- In office 21 October 2010 – 22 December 2011
- Prime Minister: José Luis Rodríguez Zapatero
- Preceded by: Miguel Ángel Moratinos
- Succeeded by: José García-Margallo y Marfil

Minister of Health and Social Policy
- In office 8 April 2009 – 21 October 2010
- Prime Minister: José Luis Rodríguez Zapatero
- Preceded by: Bernat Soria
- Succeeded by: Leire Pajín

Member of the Congress of Deputies
- In office 13 December 2011 – 12 January 2016
- Constituency: Malaga
- In office 1 April 2008 – 22 April 2008
- Constituency: Madrid

Personal details
- Born: Trinidad Jiménez García-Herrera; 4 June 1962 (age 64) Málaga, Andalusia, Spain
- Party: PSOE

Trinidad Jiménez García-Herrera (Spanish: [tɾi.niˈðað xiˈmeneθ]: born 4 June 1962) is a Spanish politician who served as minister of foreign affairs and minister of health, among others political positions. She is widely considered to be a confidante of former socialist prime ministers Felipe González and José Luis Rodríguez Zapatero. Jiménez is a member of the Inter-American Dialogue.

== Early life and education ==
Born in Málaga on 4 June 1962, the third of nine children, Jiménez has a law degree from the Autonomous University of Madrid.

== Career ==
Jiménez is an international relations specialist by profession. In 1983, while still attending Law Faculty, together with other students, she set up the Socialist Students Association. She joined Juventudes Socialistas de España, Spain's Socialist Youth and was a member of its International Relations Committee. Jiménez joined the PSOE a year later. Jiménez chaired the International Relations Committee of Spain's Youth Council and served on its Permanent Committee (1984–1986).

She was the Spanish representative on a North American NATO Youth Exchange Program (1989) and headed the 'New Programs and Development' department of the Spanish delegation of the American Field Service. Jiménez also helped run the Office of the Secretary-General of the National Commission for the Fifth Centennial of the Discovery of America.

Between 1990 and 1992, Jiménez lived in Equatorial Guinea, working as a Professor-Tutor in Political Law at the National Distance Education University (UNED) and at the Spanish College in Bata.

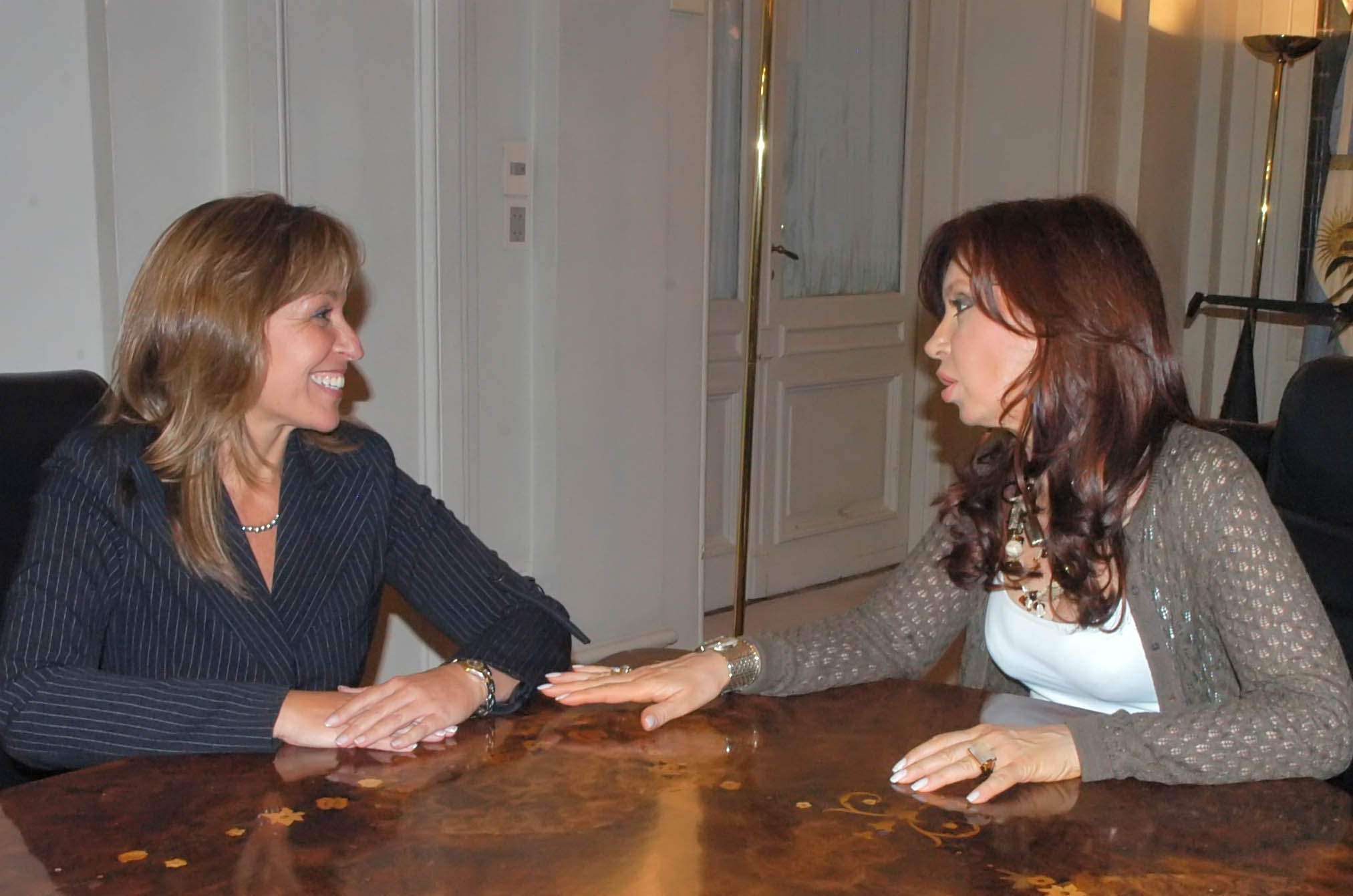
Trinidad Jiménez (left) with the (at the time) first lady of Argentina, Cristina Fernández de Kirchner.

From 1996 to July 2000, Jiménez served as the Officer in Charge of Political Relations with America in the PSOE's International Relations Secretariat and, from 1997, as an advisor to ex Prime Minister Felipe González when he was chair of the Socialist International's Global Progress Commission. She later served as her parliamentary group's spokesperson on foreign affairs.

In 2003 Jiménez was chosen to be PSOE's candidate for the Mayor of Madrid, but prior to the election was called to other duties in a new post in the Foreign Ministry as Spain's Secretary of State for Ibero-America. In March 2008 she was elected to the Spanish Congress representing Madrid but resigned after only a month.

=== Member of the Spanish Government, 2009–2011 ===
On 7 April 2009, Jiménez was chosen by the Spanish PM to be the Minister of Health and Social Affairs.

At the request of Zapatero, Jiménez stood against a local Socialist politician in a Madrid party election, but suffered a defeat. Shortly after, on 20 October 2010, she was appointed by Zapatero to be the Spanish Minister of Foreign Affairs in a cabinet reshuffle, replacing Miguel Ángel Moratinos. In her capacity as foreign minister, she met with Chinese Vice Premier Li Keqiang during his high-profile visit to Spain in 2011. Also, she led negotiations with the U.S. on cleaning Palomares, Western Europe's most radioactive site forty-five years after narrowly avoiding nuclear obliteration in a U.S. Air Force accident.

In 2014, Jiménez succeeded Elena Valenciano as her parliamentary group's spokeswoman in the Committee on Foreign Affairs of the Congress of Deputies. In this capacity, she made headlines when she promoted a non-binding motion in 2014 which "urged" the government to recognize a Palestinian state, angering the Israeli government of Prime Minister Benjamin Netanyahu. The Spanish initiative came after lawmakers in Britain and Ireland called for their governments to recognize a Palestinian state.

== Political views ==
Jiménez expressed disagreement with Cardinal Antonio Cañizares Llovera over the latter's contention that abortion was morally worse than pedophilia.

In 2010, Jiménez provoked controversy and scathing criticism from opponents of Venezuelan leader Hugo Chávez when she said that there were no political prisoners in Venezuela.

In February 2020, Jiménez joined around fifty former European prime ministers and foreign ministers in signing an open letter published by British newspaper The Guardian to condemn U.S. President Donald Trump's Middle East peace plan, saying it would create an apartheid-like situation in occupied Palestinian territory.

Political offices
Preceded by Alberto Navarro	Secretary of State for Ibero-America; 2006–2009	Succeeded by Juan Pablo de Laiglesia
Preceded by Bernat Soria	Minister of Health and Social Policy; 2009–2010	Succeeded by Leire Pajín
Preceded by Miguel Ángel Moratinos	Minister of Foreign Affairs and Cooperation; 2010–2011	Succeeded by José García-Margallo y Marfil
