= Elena Salgado =

Spanish politician (born 1949)

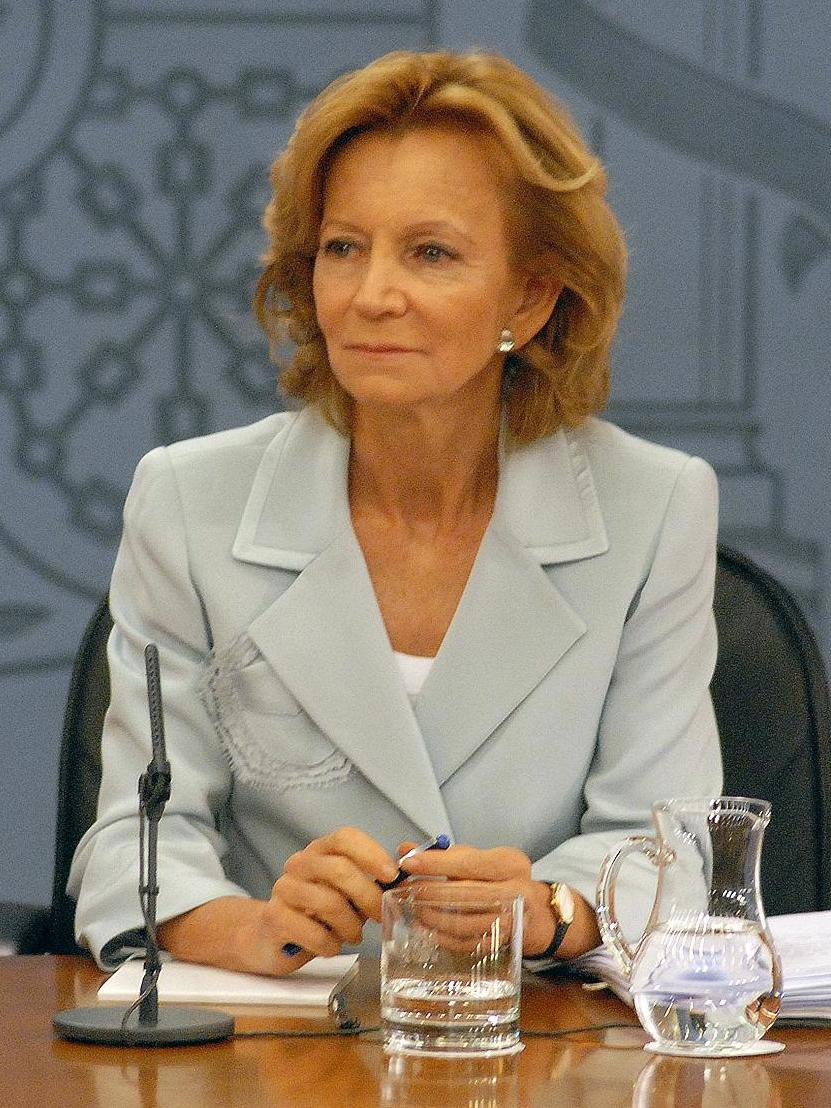

First Deputy Prime Minister of Spain
- In office 11 July 2011 – 21 December 2011
- Prime Minister: José Luis Rodríguez Zapatero
- Preceded by: Alfredo Pérez Rubalcaba
- Succeeded by: Soraya Sáenz de Santamaría

Second Deputy Prime Minister of Spain
- In office 7 April 2009 – 11 July 2011
- Prime Minister: José Luis Rodríguez Zapatero
- Preceded by: Pedro Solbes
- Succeeded by: Manuel Chaves

Minister of Economy and Finance of Spain
- In office 7 April 2009 – 21 December 2011
- Prime Minister: José Luis Rodríguez Zapatero
- Preceded by: Pedro Solbes
- Succeeded by: Luis de Guindos (Economy); Cristóbal Montoro (Finance)

Minister of Public Administrations of Spain
- In office 9 July 2007 – 7 April 2009
- Prime Minister: José Luis Rodríguez Zapatero
- Preceded by: Jordi Sevilla
- Succeeded by: Manuel Chaves

Minister of Health and Consumer Affairs of Spain
- In office 18 April 2004 – 9 July 2007
- Prime Minister: José Luis Rodríguez Zapatero
- Preceded by: Ana Pastor
- Succeeded by: Bernat Soria

Personal details
- Born: Elena Salgado Méndez; 12 May 1949 (age 77) Ourense, Spain
- Party: Socialist Workers' Party
- Education: Technical University of Madrid, Complutense University of Madrid
- Profession: Industrial Engineer, Economist

Elena Salgado Méndez (Spanish pronunciation: [eˈlena salˈɣaðo ˈmendeθ]) (born 12 May 1949 in Ourense) is a Spanish politician of the Spanish Socialist Workers' Party (PSOE) who served as Deputy Prime Minister of Spain and held several ministerial portfolios during her political career.

== Education ==
Salgado is a graduate of industrial engineering. She has a master's degree in business administration.

== Career ==
Early in her career, Salgado held high-level positions at the finance and industry ministries; Josep Borrell was considered to be a mentor to her. From 1996 until 1997, she briefly served as manager of the Teatro Real in Madrid.

From 2004 until 2007, Salgado served as Minister for Health and Consumer Affairs. In this capacity, she tried to implement the so-called wine law, a project to prevent alcohol consumption among minors; she confronted Burger King and urged the company to withdraw advertising for XXL hamburgers; and she advocated for genetic selection of embryos for therapeutic purposes. Most notably, she became known as the architect of legislation that banned smoking in public places. In 2006, she was Spain's candidate for the post of Director General of the World Health Organization (WHO). Following a selection process with 11 candidates, she emerged as the only non-medical professional among the five finalists who also included Kazem Behbehani, Shigeru Omi, Margaret Chan and Julio Frenk; the position eventually went to Chan.

As Minister for Public Administrations from 2007 until 2009, Salgado played a key role in overseeing the roll-out of a stimulus package of €8 billion ($10.7 billion) for infrastructure projects by city governments.

Despite her Galician origin Salgado later served as a deputy for Cantabria province since the 2008 general election.

From 2009 until 2011, Salgado served as minister of Economy and Finance and as first and second vice president of Spain, in the Socialist Party government of José Luis Rodríguez Zapatero. Amid a cabinet reshuffle, she succeeded Pedro Solbes as Minister of Finance in April 2009 in what was considered a surprise move by Zapatero and thereby became the first woman to hold this position. At the time, she was one of the few to have been in all of Zapatero's governments, alongside María Teresa Fernández de la Vega, Elena Espinosa and Miguel Ángel Moratinos. She held the office until the fall of the Zapatero Administration in the 2011 general election.

When Spain held the rotating presidency of the Council of the European Union in 2010, Salgado chaired the meetings of its Economic and Financial Affairs Council. During her time as chair, EU finance ministers agreed on a deal that provided $560 billion in new loans and $76 billion under an existing lending program to countries facing instability amid the European debt crisis. Also in 2010, she helped launch the Global Agriculture and Food Security Program (GAFSP), then a $875 million fund to help poor farmers, alongside several of her counterparts – Tim Geithner, Jim Flaherty and Yoon Jeung-hyun –, World Bank president Robert Zoellick and Bill Gates.

On 12 July 2011, Salgado became Deputy Prime Minister for Economic Affairs, equivalent to the position of First Deputy Prime Minister, a position that Alfredo Perez Rubalcaba decided to leave to prepare his candidacy for the 2011 general election.

In this capacity, Salgado led the central government's efforts in 2011 to force new budget controls on Spain's powerful autonomous communities – that control one-third of spending in the country – to ensure it meets its ambitious budget-deficit targets, including by establishing penalties for the regions that fail to meet their budget targets. She also temporarily reinstated a wealth tax on people with net assets of more than €700,000 ($962,780) in 2011 and 2012, a measure designed to help close what was one of Europe's largest budget gaps at the time while easing widespread voter discontent with spending cuts.

== Life after politics ==
Since 2016, Salgado has been serving as president of the Asociación Española de Empresas de Consultoría (AEC), a lobby group.

== Other activities ==
=== International organizations ===
- African Development Bank (AfDB), Ex-Officio Member of the Board of Governors (2009–2011)
- Asian Development Bank (ADB), Ex-Officio Member of the Board of Governors (2009–2011)
- European Bank for Reconstruction and Development (EBRD), Ex-Officio Member of the Board of Governors (2009–2011)
- European Investment Bank (EIB), Ex-Officio Member of the Board of Governors (2009–2011)

=== Corporate boards ===
- Doppel Farmaceutici, Member of the Board of Directors
- Trilantic Europe, Member of the Advisory Council
- Saba Infraestructuras, Member of the Board of Directors (since 2020)
- Motion Rail, Member of the Board of Directors (since 2019)
- Nueva Pescanova, Member of the Board of Directors (since 2016)
- Chilectra, Member of the Board of Directors (2011–2015)
- Abertis Telecom, Member of the Board of Directors (2003–2004)
- Hispasat, Member of the Board of Directors (1991–1996)
- Renfe Operadora, Member of the Board of Directors (1985–1991)
- Trasmediterránea, Member of the Board of Directors (1985–1991)

== Personal life ==
Salgado has a daughter.
