= Magdalena Álvarez =

Spanish politician

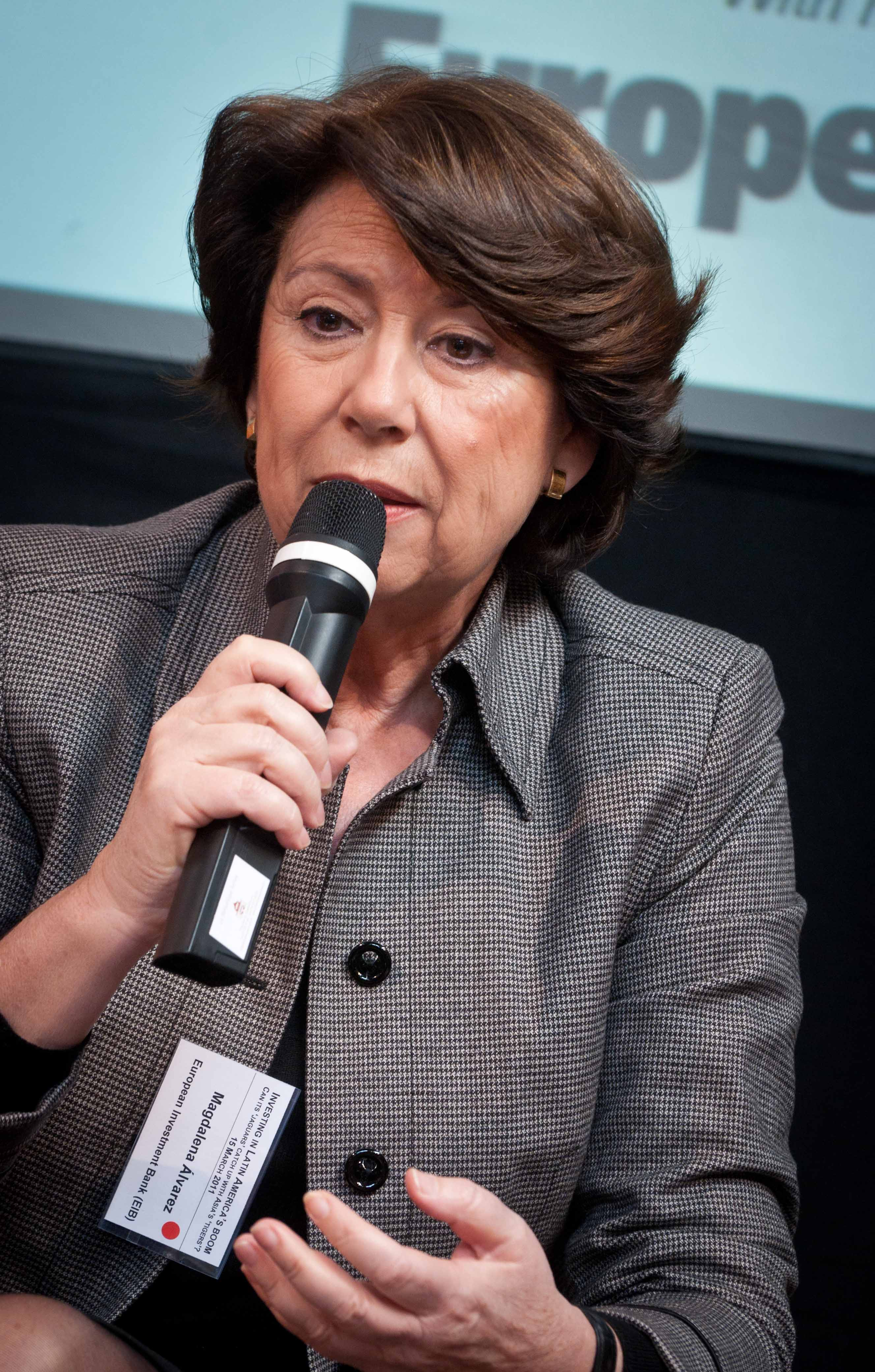
Álvarez in 2011

Magdalena Álvarez Arza (born 15 February 1952) is a Spanish politician. From 2004 to 2009, she served as Minister of Public Works (Fomento). She is an MP for the Spanish Socialist Workers' Party (PSOE) for Málaga Province. Previously, she was the Minister for the Economy in the Junta de Andalucía.

== Pre-political life ==
Álvarez was born in San Fernando, in the Province of Cádiz, on 15 February 1952. She holds a doctorate in Economic and Business Science from the Universidad Complutense de Madrid, and taught economics at the Spanish National Open University between 1977 and 1990; at the Escuela de Prácticas Jurídicas in Málaga (1981–1989); and at the Instituto de Estudios Fiscales (1981–1989).

In 1979 she joined the Spanish Tax Inspectorate, holding various roles within the Ministry of Finance and afterwards in the AEAT, the Spanish Revenue Service.

She was Chief Inspector of the Tax delegation to Málaga from 1987 to 1989, Director of Regional Economic Incentives (1989–1993) a Director of the Department of Financial Inspection of the National Tax Inspectorate.

== Political life and judicial case ==
Álvarez was an MP in the Andalusian parliament for the province of Málaga, and in August 1994 she was named Minister of the Economy and Revenue for the Junta de Andalucía, becoming a member of the second cabinet of Manuel Chaves.

During her time as a minister, neither of her two budgets were approved by the Parliament.

In 1996, after the regional elections, she was confirmed in her post by Chaves, subsequently focusing on the payment of Andalucía's public debt and autonomous finance.

In the subsequent elections, in March 2000, Chaves kept her as head of the Ministry of Economy and Revenue for the sixth Andaluz Parliament.

In the Spanish General Election of 2004, she was number one on the Socialist list for the Chamber of Deputies for the province of Mâlaga, while supporting José Luis Rodríguez Zapatero in his successful bid to become Prime Minister of Spain.

Just before those elections, in January, Álvarez – married and the mother of one daughter – was elected president of the Socialist Political Conference committee. After this election, she was named as Minister of Public Works.

She was re-elected in 2008 as MP for the province of Málaga, continuing as Minister of Public Works until April 2009 when she was substituted by José Blanco.

On 2 July 2013 Alvarez was formally charged by Judge Alaya in the ERE case in Andalusia, due to a consistent pattern of alleged misappropriation of public funds between 2001 and 2010 under the leadership of the PSOE. In March 2014 the judge imposed Ms Alvarez a civil bail of 29 million Euros and proceeded to seize several properties and 6 bank accounts when she was unable to provide the guarantee.

Preceded by Francisco Alvarez Cascos	Minister of Public Works; 2004–2009	Succeeded by José Blanco
