= José Blanco López =

Spanish politician (born 1962)

José Blanco
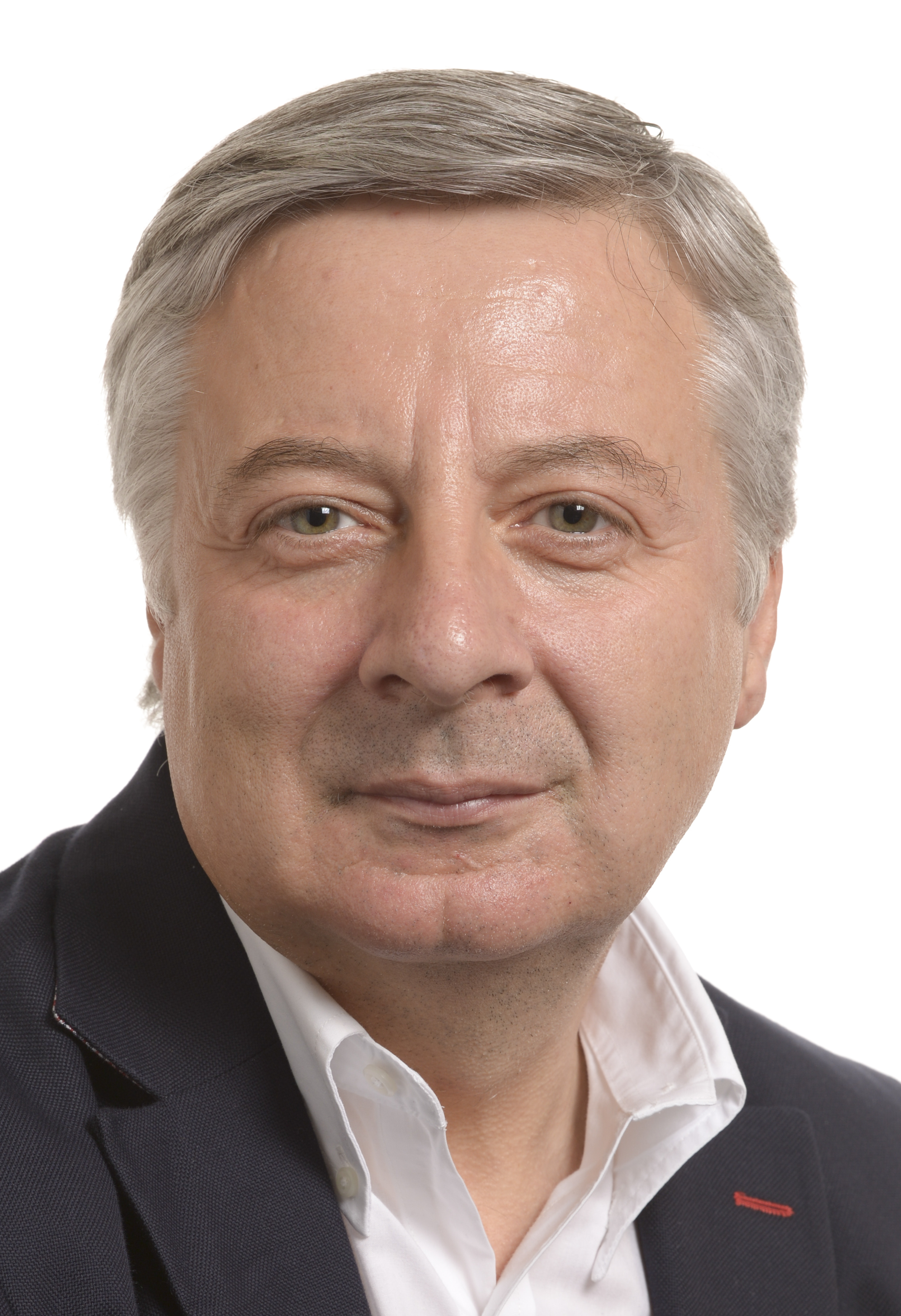

Minister of Public Works and Transport
- In office 7 April 2009 – 21 December 2011
- Prime Minister: José Luis Rodríguez Zapatero
- Preceded by: Magdalena Álvarez
- Succeeded by: Ana Pastor Julián

Member of the Congress of Deputies
- In office 4 May 1996 – 1 July 2014
- Constituency: Lugo

Personal details
- Born: 6 February 1962 (age 64) Palas de Rei, Lugo, Spain
- Party: Spanish Socialist Workers' Party (PSOE)
- Spouse: Ana Mourenza (m. 1999)
- Children: two

José Blanco López (born 6 February 1962), also known as Pepe Blanco, is a Spanish socialist politician. He was the deputy general of the Spanish Socialist Workers' Party (PSOE) and was the Minister of Public Works and Transport from 2009 to 2011.

== Political career ==
Blanco López began his political career in 1986 when he was elected to the Spanish Senate. In 1996 he was elected to the Spanish Congress as a deputy for Lugo Province and was re-elected in 2000, 2004 and 2008. He is a trustee of the Fundacion IDEAS, Spain's Socialist Party's think tank.

Blanco López was appointed Minister of Public Works and Transport in a cabinet reshuffle on 7 April 2009, replacing Magdalena Álvarez. On July 11, 2011, he was appointed spokesperson of the government without losing previous duties.

== Controversy ==
On 28 December 2011 Spain's Supreme Court opened a probe into Blanco López's conduct on charges of influence peddling and accepting bribes. In 2013, the Spanish Supreme Court dismissed the case against him for those charges. In 2011, José Blanco received the Grand Cross of the Order of Carlos III from the new prime minister, Mariano Rajoy.

== Other activities ==
- Enagás, Independent Member of the Board of Directors

Political offices
Preceded by Magdalena Álvarez	Minister of Public Works, Transports and Housing; 2009–2011	Succeeded by Ana Pastor Julián
Party political offices
Preceded by Ciprià Císcar	Secretary of Organization of the Spanish Socialist Workers' Party; 2000–2008	Succeeded by Leire Pajín
Preceded by Alfonso Guerra	Deputy Secretary-General of the Spanish Socialist Workers' Party; 2008–2012	Succeeded by Elena Valenciano
