= Bernat Soria =

Spanish scientist

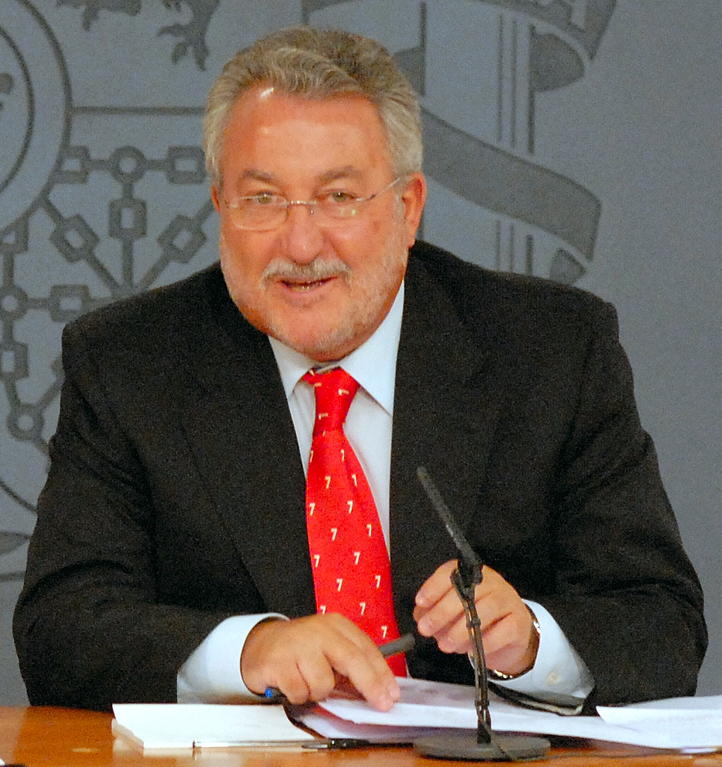

Minister of Health and Consumer Affairs
- In office 9 July 2007 – 8 April 2009
- Prime Minister: José Luis Rodríguez Zapatero
- Preceded by: Elena Salgado
- Succeeded by: Trinidad Jiménez

Member of the Congress of Deputies
- In office 1 April 2008 – 7 November 2009
- Constituency: Alicante

Personal details
- Born: 7 May 1951 (age 75) Carlet, Spain
- Party: PSOE
- Education: University of Valencia
- Occupation: Scientist and politician

Bernat Soria Escoms (born 7 May 1951) is a Spanish scientist. He is also affiliated with the Spanish Socialist Workers' Party, for whom he served as Minister of Health from 2007 to 2009.

He was educated at the University of Valencia (MD, PhD), and completed his postdoctoral studies at the Max Planck Institute for Biophysical Chemistry and the University of East Anglia where he was a Senior Research Associate in the School of Biological Sciences.

He has been Visiting Professor at the National University of Singapore (2001-2005), President of the European Stem Cell Network and President of the European Association of Biophysical Societies (EBSA, 2000-2004). He has previously held positions such as the presidency of the Spanish Diabetes Society (SED) and its Foundation (FSED), the Spanish Biophysical Society (SBE) and the Spanish Society of Physiological Sciences (SECF). He has published more than 160 research articles (Web of Science; PubMed) and edited several books. His scientific production has received more than 11.000 citations in the fields of stem cell research, diabetes, biophysics of pancreatic islets and their pathophysiology. He was a pioneer in the field of differentiation of stem cells into insulin-producing cells (his publication in the journal Diabetes (2000), with more than 1.200 citations belongs to the group of "Highly Cited Papers").

He is currently a Researcher in the Institut of Bioengineering and the Health Research Institut (ISABIAL) of the Alicante University Hospital and chairs the Andalusian Foundation for Research and Development (FAID). Among other recognitions, he has received the Prize and Gold Medal of the Royal National Academy of Medicine, the Alberto Sols Prize for Research in Health Sciences, the Galien International Prize, the Andalusian Medal and, more recently, His Majesty the King Juan Carlos I, granted him the Grand Cross of the Order of Carlos III. He is Doctor Honoris causa by the Scientific Universities of the South (2013) and the National Mayor of San Marcos, Lima (2014). In 2015 he was appointed Honorary Fellow of the Royal College of Physicians of the United Kingdom, a consultative body of the British Crown for the assistance and teaching of Medicine, founded by Enrique VIII, is now celebrating his first 500 years, becoming the first Spanish to receive this recognition

He is currently on trial for the crime of asset concealment stemming from the transfer of certain assets to his daughters following a final judgment ordering Bernat Soria to pay 520,000 euros—including principal, interest, and court costs—to a company that sued him.
