= Leire Pajín =

Spanish politician (born 1976)

Leire Pajín MEP
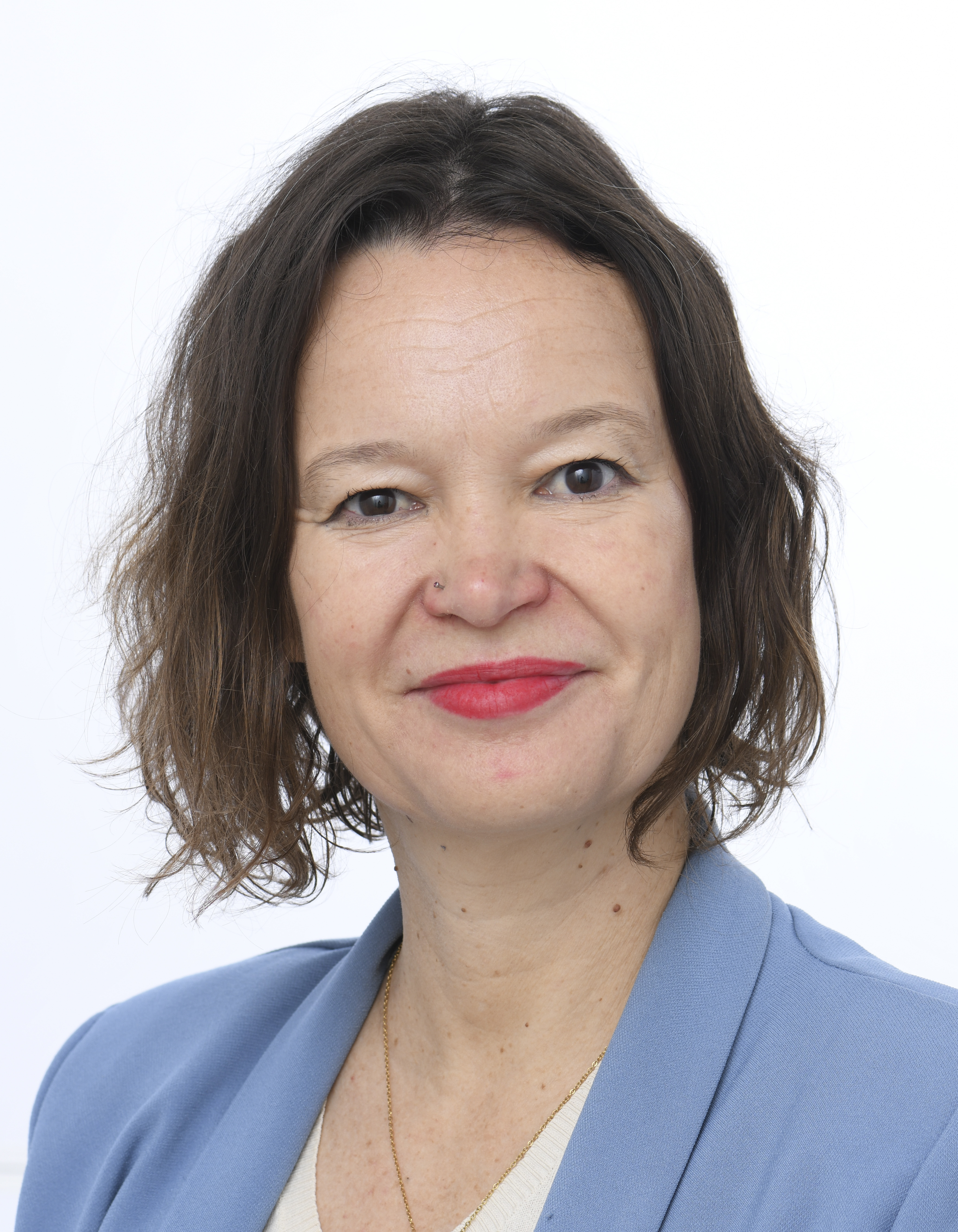
- Pajín in 2024

Member of the European Parliament for Spain
- Incumbent
- Assumed office 2024

Minister of Health and Social Policy and Equality
- In office 2010–2011
- Prime Minister: José Luis Rodríguez Zapatero
- Preceded by: Trinidad Jiménez
- Succeeded by: Ana Mato

Personal details
- Born: 16 September 1976 (age 50) San Sebastián, Spain
- Party: Spanish Socialist Workers' Party
- Education: University of Alicante

Leire Pajín Iraola (Spanish pronunciation: [ˈlejɾe paˈxin]; San Sebastián, September 16, 1976) is a Spanish sociologist and politician of the Spanish Socialist Workers' Party (PSOE) who has been serving as a Member of the European Parliament since 2024.

From 2010 to 2011, Pajín held the position of Minister of Health, Social Policy and Equality in the government of Prime Minister José Luis Rodríguez Zapatero. She served as Deputy Secretary General of the PSPV between April and July 2012.

== Early life and education ==
Pajín was born in San Sebastián but moved with her parents to Benidorm when she was a child. She graduated at the University of Alicante with a Sociology degree in 1998.

== Career ==
=== Career in national politics ===
In 2000 and 2004 Pajín was elected to the Congress of Deputies representing Alicante.

Although she had no professional experience outside her political party, Pajín was chosen to serve as the Secretary of State for International Cooperation and the President of the Spanish Agency for International Development Cooperation (AECID) from 2004 to 2008 in the first Zapatero government. In this capacity, she was involved in the development and approval of the Master Plan for Spanish Cooperation (2005-2008) that increased Spanish official development aid threefold to 0.5% of GDP. From 2007, she was a member of the World Bank Group’s High Level Advisory Council on Women's Economic Empowerment, which was chaired by Danny Leipziger and Heidemarie Wieczorek-Zeul.

After briefly serving as Minister for Health, Social Policy and Equality in 2010/11, Pajín remained deputy for Alicante.

=== Career in the non-profit sector ===
In July 2012 Pajín announced that she would temporarily quit politics and consequently her seat in the Chamber of Deputies. Between 2012 and 2014, she served as Special Advisor to the Pan American Health Organization (PAHO) and was a policy advisor to the United Nations Development Programme (UNDP) Post-2015 Agenda team.

From 2014 to 2024, Pajín served as Director of Global Development at the Institute for Global Health (ISGlobal) of Barcelona, a non-profit think tank supported by the Ministry of Foreign Affairs and Cooperation.

=== Member of the European Parliament, 2024–present ===
In parliament, Pajín has been serving on the Committee on Development. In addition to her committee assignments, she is part of the parliament’s delegations to the Euro-Latin American Parliamentary Assembly and for relations with the countries of the Andean Community.

== Other activities ==
- EU-LAC Foundation, President (since 2020)
- Friends of the Global Fund (Europe), Member of the Board of Directors (since 2020)
- OECD Development Centre on Latin America, Member of the advisory board on the Latin American Economic Outlook 2008
