= Elena Valenciano =

Spanish politician

Elena Valenciano MEP
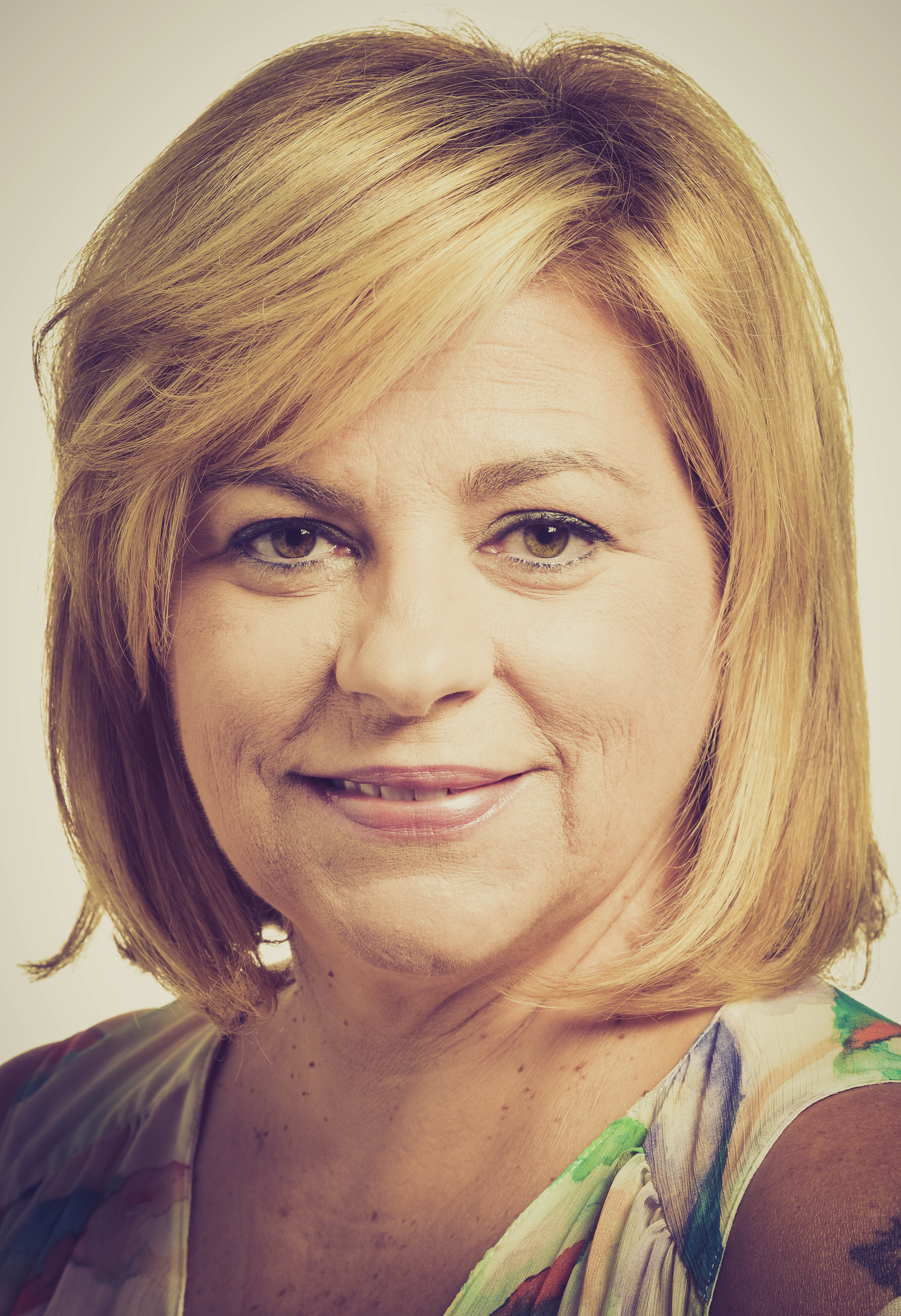

Chair of the European Parliament Human Rights Subcommittee
- In office 7 July 2014 – 2019
- Preceded by: Barbara Lochbihler

Member of the European Parliament for Spain
- In office 1999–2019

Personal details
- Born: Elena Valenciano; 18 September 1960 (age 65) Madrid, Spain
- Party: Socialist Workers' Party
- Spouse: Javier de Udaeta
- Children: 2

María Elena Valenciano Martínez-Orozco (born 18 September 1960) is a Spanish politician of the Spanish Socialist Workers' Party, part of the Party of European Socialists.

== Political career ==
=== Member of the European Parliament, 1999–2008 ===
Following the 1999 European elections, Valenciano became a Member of the European Parliament, where she served as Deputy Secretary-General and spokesperson of the Spanish Socialist Delegation. In addition, she was the Socialist Group coordinator in the Subcommittee on Human Rights (DROI).

=== Member of the Spanish Parliament, 2008–2014 ===
Valenciano resigned from the European Parliament in 2008 when she was elected to the Spanish Congress of Deputies in the national elections, representing Madrid. As member of parliament, she served as the Socialist Party's spokesperson on the Committee on Foreign Affairs. From 2012 to 2014, she was also the Socialists' deputy secretary general, under the leadership of Alfredo Pérez Rubalcaba.

=== Member of the European Parliament, 2014–2019 ===
In February 2014, the Spanish Socialist Workers Party chose Valenciano as its lead candidate for the European elections; at the time, PSOE was the second biggest Socialist party delegation in the European Parliament's S&D Group, with 23 MEPs.

On 14 May 2014, Valenciano and her Conservative counterpart Miguel Arias Cañete were featured in Spanish television's first live debate between the country's leading candidates for a European Parliament election. Valenciano was widely perceived to have beaten Arias in the debate, yet the PSOE returned just 14 MEPs to the Parliament, nine fewer than it had in 2009.

Following the elections, Valenciano reentered the European Parliament and assumed the position of chairwoman of the Subcommittee on Human Rights (DROI). In this capacity, she was also a member of the Democracy Support and Election Coordination Group (DEG), which oversees the Parliament's election observation missions. In addition, she served on the Committee on Foreign Affairs (AFET), the delegation for relations with the Maghreb countries and the Arab Maghreb Union, and the delegation to the Parliamentary Assembly of the Union for the Mediterranean. She was also a member of the European Parliament Intergroup on the Western Sahara.

In September 2014, PSOE chairman Pedro Sánchez replaced Valenciano as head of the party's delegation of MEPs and instead appointed Iratxe García.

During the 2015 presidential elections in Haiti, Valenciano headed the European Union's observation mission to monitor the preparations and organization of the vote.

== Other activities ==
- Member of the Strategic and Advisory Committee, European Centre for Electoral Support (ECES)
- European Endowment for Democracy (EED), member of the board of governors
- EU Women Caucus, member of the board
- Fundacion IDEAS, member of the board of trustees
