= Antonio Camacho Vizcaíno =

Spanish politician

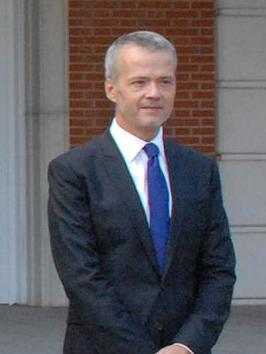
Antonio Camacho

Antonio Camacho Vizcaíno (born 11 February 1964 in Madrid, Spain) is a Spanish politician and former Minister of the Interior. He was the Spanish's Secretary of State of Security between 2004 and 2011. Since 2011 to 2014, he has represented Zamora Province for the Spanish Socialist Workers' Party in the Spanish Congress of Deputies.

In February 2025, he was awarded with the Gold Cross of the Order of Merit for Security.
