= First government of José Luis Rodríguez Zapatero =

2004–2008 government of Spain

1st government of José Luis Rodríguez Zapatero
- Government of Spain
- 2004–2008
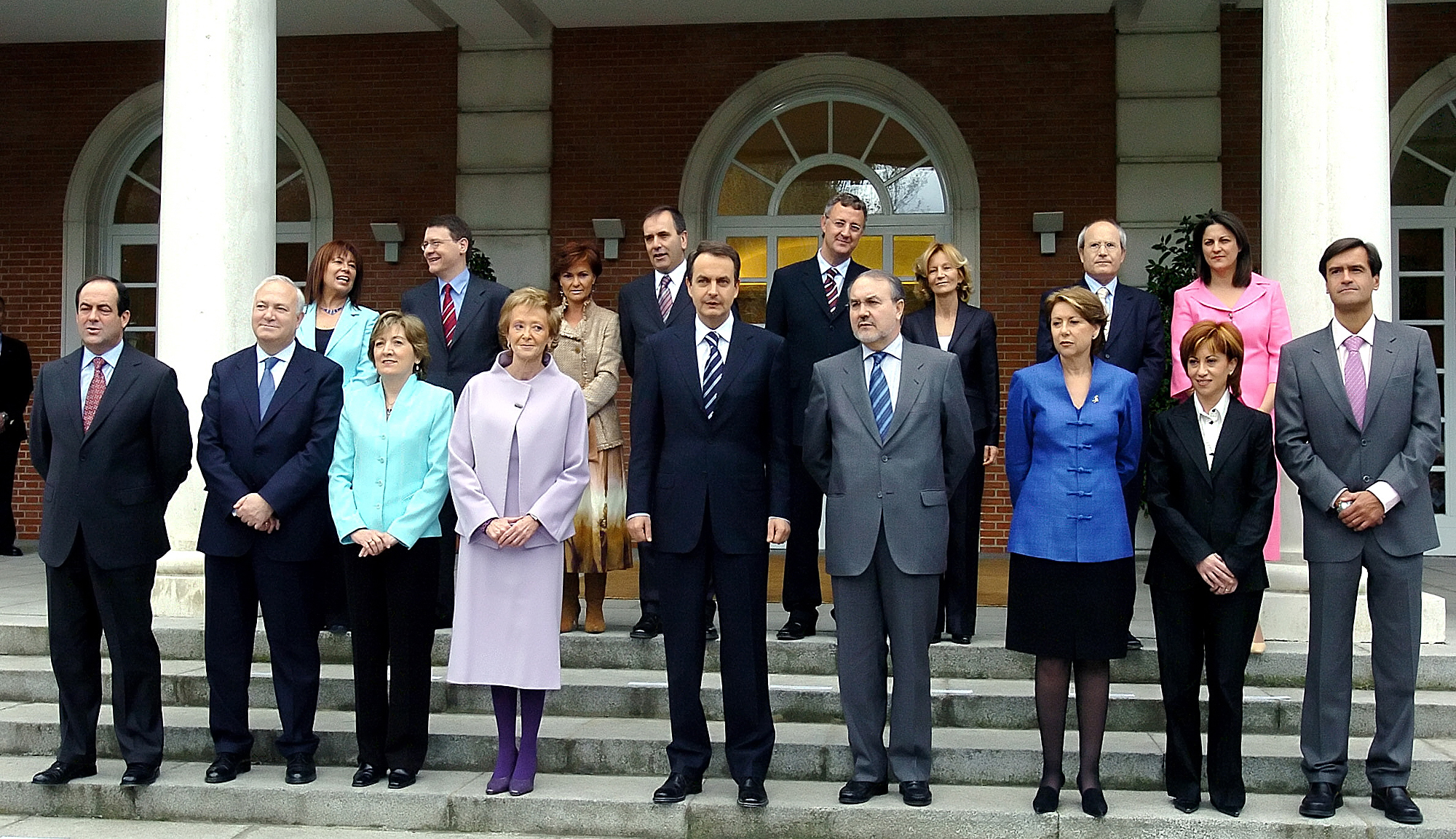
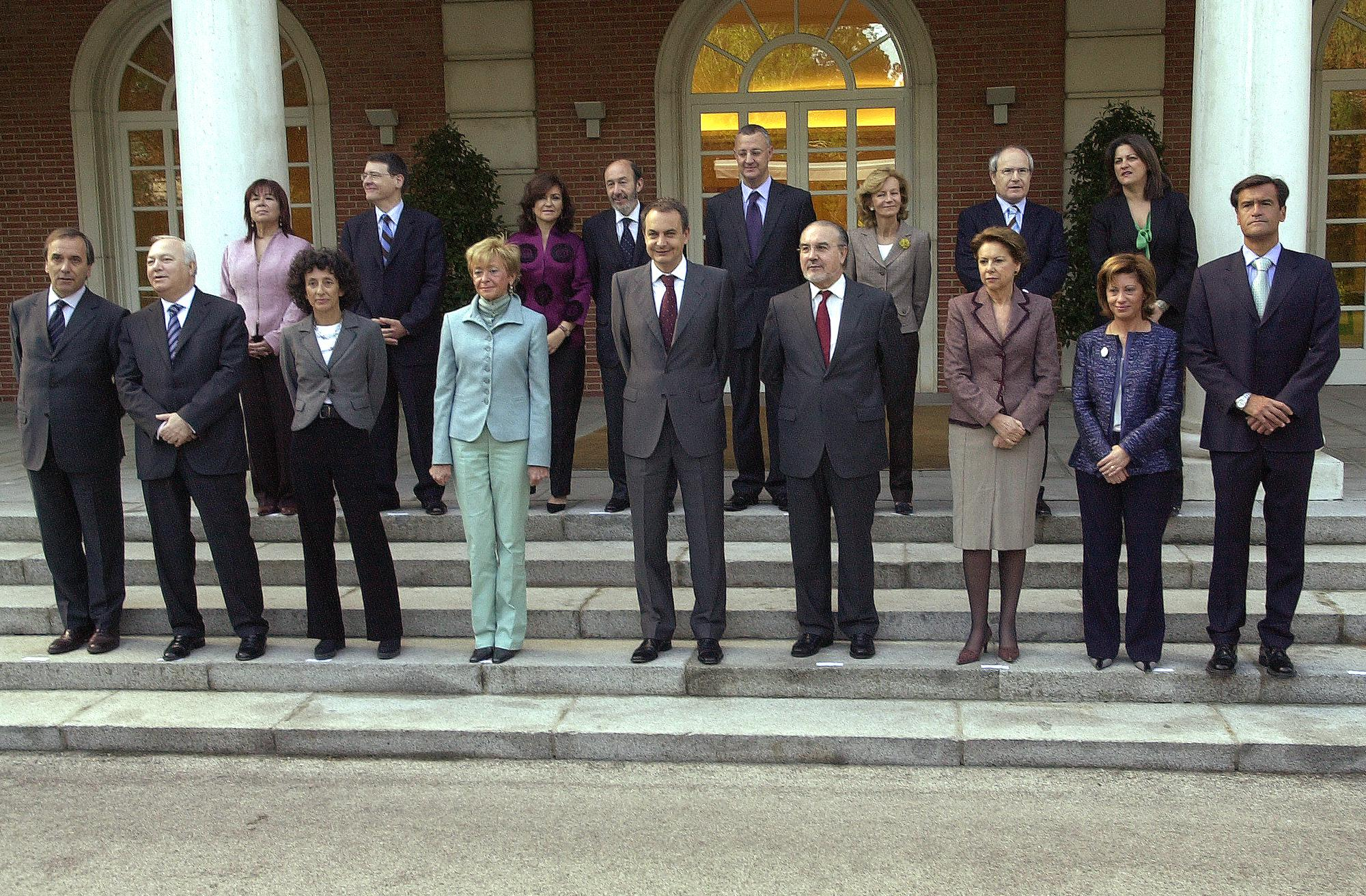
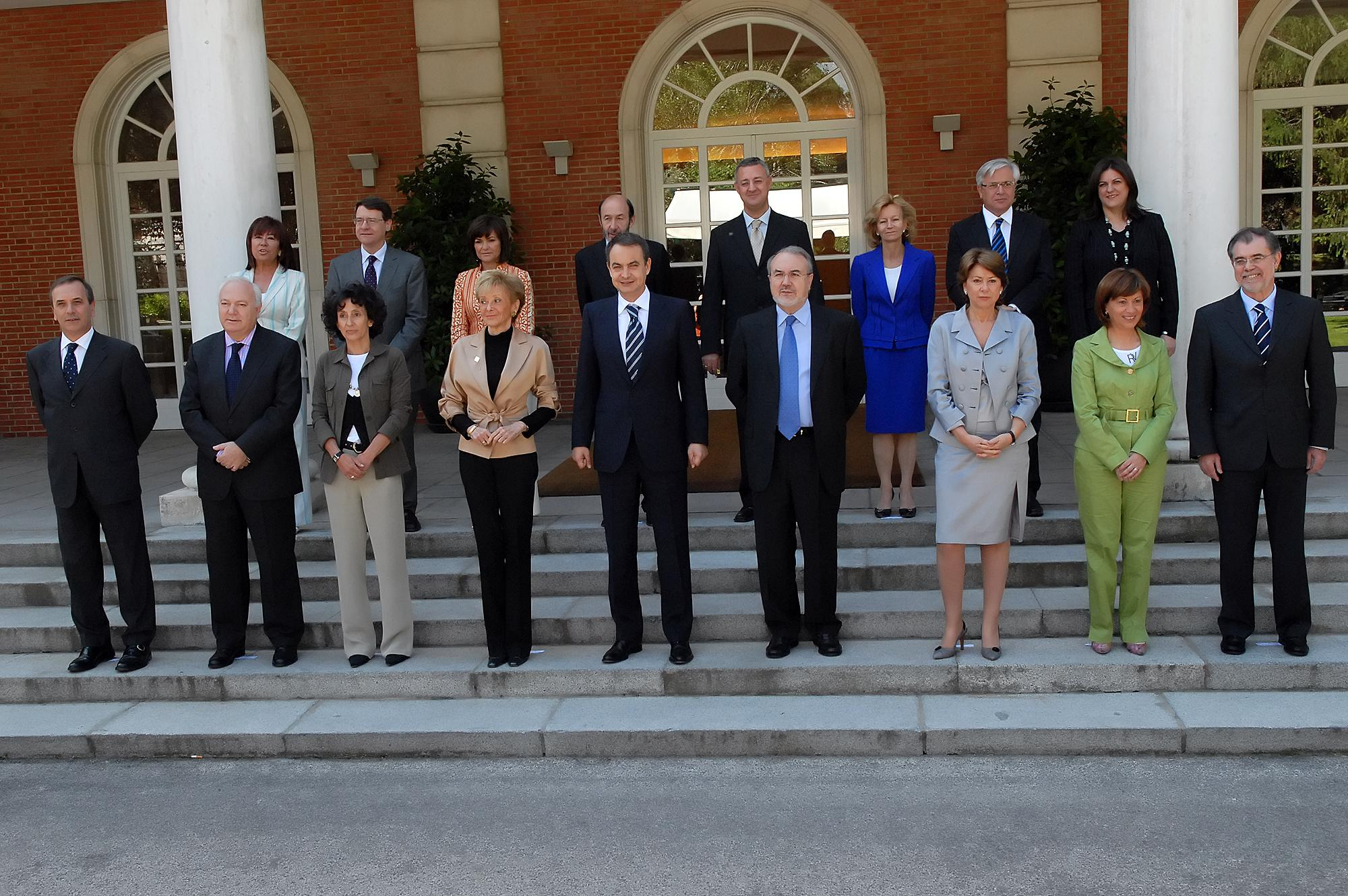
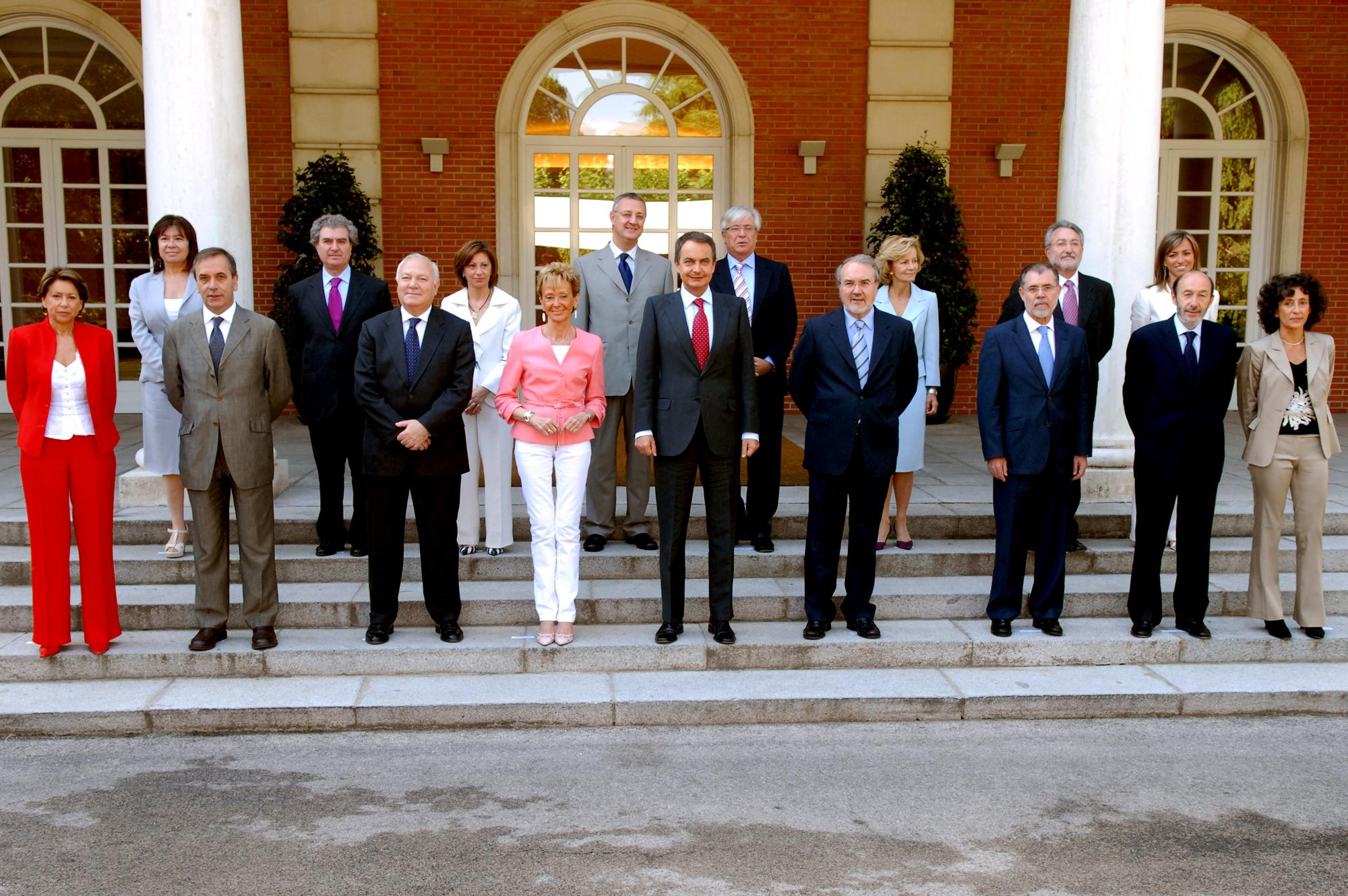
- The government in April 2004 (top left), April 2006 (top right), June 2007 (bottom left) and July 2007 (bottom right)
- Date formed: 18 April 2004
- Date dissolved: 14 April 2008

People and organisations
- Monarch: Juan Carlos I
- Prime Minister: José Luis Rodríguez Zapatero
- Deputy Prime Ministers: First: María Teresa Fernández de la Vega; Second: Pedro Solbes
- No. of ministers: 16 (Note: Does not include the prime minister.)
- Total no. of members: 23
- Member party: PSOE
- Status in legislature: Minority (single-party)
- Opposition party: PP
- Opposition leader: Mariano Rajoy

History
- Election: 2004 general election
- Outgoing election: 2008 general election
- Legislature term: 8th Cortes Generales
- Budget: 2005, 2006, 2007, 2008
- Predecessor: Aznar II
- Successor: Zapatero II

The first government of José Luis Rodríguez Zapatero was formed on 18 April 2004, following the latter's election as prime minister of Spain by the Congress of Deputies on 16 April and his swearing-in on 17 April, as a result of the Spanish Socialist Workers' Party (PSOE) emerging as the largest parliamentary force at the 2004 Spanish general election. It succeeded the second Aznar government and was the government of Spain from 18 April 2004 to 14 April 2008, a total of 1,457 days, or 3 years, 11 months and 27 days.

The cabinet comprised members of the PSOE (including its sister party, the Socialists' Party of Catalonia, PSC) and a number of independents. It was automatically dismissed on 10 March 2008 as a consequence of the 2008 general election, but remained in acting capacity until the next government was sworn in.

== Investiture ==
Investiture; Congress of Deputies; Nomination of José Luis Rodríguez Zapatero (PSOE)
Ballot →	16 April 2004
Required majority →	176 out of 350
Yes: • PSOE (164); • ERC (8); • IU–ICV (5); • CC (3); • BNG (2); • CHA (1)	183 / 350
No: • PP (148)	148 / 350
Abstentions: • CiU (10); • PNV (7); • EA (1); • NaBai (1)	19 / 350
Absentees	0 / 350

== Cabinet changes ==
Zapatero's first government saw a number of cabinet changes during its tenure:

- On 7 April 2006, José Bono's stepping down as Minister of Defence out of personal motives, a decision which had been taken throughout the months prior, led to the first cabinet reshuffle of Zapatero's premiership. José Antonio Alonso replaced Bono in Defence, and in turn he was replaced by Alfredo Pérez Rubalcaba as Minister of the Interior. María Jesús San Segundo was replaced by Mercedes Cabrera as Minister of Education and Science. The new ministers were sworn into office on 11 April.
- On 8 September 2006, José Montilla stepped down as Minister of Industry, Tourism and Trade in order to run as the Socialists' Party of Catalonia (PSC)'s candidate for President of the Government of Catalonia in the 2006 Catalan regional election. He was succeeded by Mayor of Barcelona Joan Clos.
- On 12 February 2007, Mariano Fernández Bermejo replaced Juan Fernando López Aguilar as Minister of Justice, after the latter's decision to lead the Spanish Socialist Workers' Party (PSOE) into the 2007 Canarian regional election. López Aguilar had been nominated unopposed as the party's leading candidate for President of the Canary Islands on 28 October 2006, after several months of speculation.
- On 9 July 2007, a second major cabinet reshuffle saw Bernat Soria replacing Elena Salgado as Minister of Health and Consumer Affairs, who in turn replaced Jordi Sevilla in the Public Administrations ministry. María Antonia Trujillo was replaced by Carme Chacón as Minister of Housing, and César Antonio Molina became the new officeholder of the Culture portfolio replacing Carmen Calvo.

== Council of Ministers ==
The Council of Ministers was structured into the offices for the prime minister, the two deputy prime ministers, 16 ministries and the post of the spokesperson of the Government.

← Zapatero I Government → (18 April 2004 – 14 April 2008)
Portfolio	Name	Party	Took office	Left office	Ref.
Prime Minister	José Luis Rodríguez Zapatero	PSOE	17 April 2004	12 April 2008	
First Deputy Prime Minister; Minister of the Presidency; Spokesperson of the Government	Mª Teresa Fernández de la Vega	Independent	18 April 2004	14 April 2008	
Second Deputy Prime Minister; Minister of Economy and Finance	Pedro Solbes	Independent	18 April 2004	14 April 2008	
Minister of Foreign Affairs and Cooperation	Miguel Ángel Moratinos	PSOE	18 April 2004	14 April 2008	
Minister of Justice	Juan Fernando López Aguilar	PSOE	18 April 2004	12 February 2007	
Minister of Defence	José Bono	PSOE	18 April 2004	11 April 2006	
Minister of the Interior	José Antonio Alonso	Independent	18 April 2004	11 April 2006	
Minister of Development	Magdalena Álvarez	PSOE	18 April 2004	14 April 2008	
Minister of Education and Science	María Jesús San Segundo	Independent	18 April 2004	11 April 2006	
Minister of Labour and Social Affairs	Jesús Caldera	PSOE	18 April 2004	14 April 2008	
Minister of Industry, Tourism and Trade	José Montilla	PSOE^{/PSC}	18 April 2004	8 September 2006	
Minister of Agriculture, Fisheries and Food	Elena Espinosa	PSOE	18 April 2004	14 April 2008	
Minister of Public Administrations	Jordi Sevilla	PSOE	18 April 2004	9 July 2007	
Minister of Culture	Carmen Calvo	PSOE	18 April 2004	9 July 2007	
Minister of Health and Consumer Affairs	Elena Salgado	Independent	18 April 2004	9 July 2007	
Minister of Environment	Cristina Narbona	PSOE	18 April 2004	14 April 2008	
Minister of Housing	María Antonia Trujillo	PSOE	18 April 2004	9 July 2007	
=== Changes April 2006 ===
Portfolio	Name	Party	Took office	Left office	Ref.
Minister of Defence	José Antonio Alonso	Independent	11 April 2006	14 April 2008	
Minister of the Interior	Alfredo Pérez Rubalcaba	PSOE	11 April 2006	14 April 2008	
Minister of Education and Science	Mercedes Cabrera	Independent	11 April 2006	14 April 2008	
=== Changes September 2006 ===
Portfolio	Name	Party	Took office	Left office	Ref.
Minister of Industry, Tourism and Trade	Joan Clos	PSOE^{/PSC}	8 September 2006	14 April 2008	
=== Changes February 2007 ===
Portfolio	Name	Party	Took office	Left office	Ref.
Minister of Justice	Mariano Fernández Bermejo	Independent	12 February 2007	14 April 2008	
=== Changes July 2007 ===
Portfolio	Name	Party	Took office	Left office	Ref.
Minister of Public Administrations	Elena Salgado	Independent	9 July 2007	14 April 2008	
Minister of Culture	César Antonio Molina	Independent	9 July 2007	14 April 2008	
Minister of Health and Consumer Affairs	Bernat Soria	Independent	9 July 2007	14 April 2008	
Minister of Housing	Carme Chacón	PSOE^{/PSC}	9 July 2007	14 April 2008	

== Departmental structure ==
José Luis Rodríguez Zapatero's first government was organised into several superior and governing units, whose number, powers and hierarchical structure varied depending on the ministerial department.

Unit/body rank

- (■) Secretary of state
- (■) Undersecretary
- (■) Director-general
- (●) Autonomous agency
- (◆) Military & intelligence agency

Office (Original name)	Portrait	Name	Took office	Left office	Alliance/party	Ref.
=== Prime Minister's Office ===
Prime Minister (Presidencia del Gobierno)		José Luis Rodríguez Zapatero	17 April 2004	12 April 2008	PSOE	
Prime Minister (Presidencia del Gobierno)	20 April 2004 – 22 April 2008: (■) Cabinet of the Prime Minister's Office–Chief of Staff; (■) Deputy Chief of Staff; (■) Department of Institutional Affairs; (■) Department of International Policy and Security; (■) Department of Analysis and Studies; (■) Department of Education and Culture; (■) General Secretariat of the Prime Minister's Office; (■) Deputy General Secretariat; (■) Department of Protocol; (■) Department of Security; (■) Department of Infrastructure and Monitoring for Crisis Situations; (■) Economic Office of the Prime Minister; (■) Deputy Directorate of the Economic Office (est. 13 Jul 2004); (■) Department of Economic Policy; (■) Department of Welfare Society; (■) High Commissioner for Support to Victims of Terrorism (est. 21 Dec 2004; disest. 12 Sep 2006)					
First Deputy Prime Minister (Vicepresidencia Primera del Gobierno)		Mª Teresa Fernández de la Vega	18 April 2004	14 April 2008	PSOE (Independent)	
First Deputy Prime Minister (Vicepresidencia Primera del Gobierno)	See Ministry of the Presidency					
Second Deputy Prime Minister (Vicepresidencia Segunda del Gobierno)		Pedro Solbes	18 April 2004	14 April 2008	PSOE (Independent)	
Second Deputy Prime Minister (Vicepresidencia Segunda del Gobierno)	See Ministry of Economy and Finance					
=== Ministry of Foreign Affairs and Cooperation ===
Ministry of Foreign Affairs and Cooperation (Ministerio de Asuntos Exteriores y de Cooperación)		Miguel Ángel Moratinos	18 April 2004	14 April 2008	PSOE	
Ministry of Foreign Affairs and Cooperation (Ministerio de Asuntos Exteriores y de Cooperación)	20 April – 13 June 2004: (■) State Secretariat for Foreign Affairs and for Ibero-America; (■) General Secretariat for Foreign Policy; (■) Directorate-General for Foreign Policy for Europe and North America; (■) Directorate-General for Foreign Policy for the Mediterranean, the Middle East and Africa; (■) Directorate-General for Foreign Policy for Ibero-America; (■) Directorate-General for Foreign Policy for Asia and the Pacific; (■) Directorate-General for International Economic Relations; (■) Directorate-General for International Affairs of Terrorism, Security and Disarmament; (■) Directorate-General for the United Nations, Human Rights and Multilateral Organizations; (■) State Secretariat for the European Union; (■) Directorate-General for Coordination and Integration of General and Technical Affairs of the European Union; (■) Directorate-General for the Internal Market and other European Union Policies; (■) State Secretariat for International Cooperation; (■) Directorate-General for Cultural and Scientific Relations; (■) Undersecretariat of Foreign Affairs and Cooperation; (■) Technical General Secretariat; (■) Directorate-General for the Foreign Service; (■) Directorate-General for Consular Affairs and Assistance; (■) Introducer of Ambassadors; (■) Directorate-General for Communication Abroad; 13 June 2004 – 16 April 2008: (■) State Secretariat for Foreign Affairs and for Ibero-America (until 9 Sep 2006) / State Secretariat for Foreign Affairs (from 9 Sep 2006); (■) Directorate-General for Foreign Policy; (■) Directorate-General for Foreign Policy for Europe and North America; (■) Directorate-General for Foreign Policy for Ibero-America (until 17 Sep 2006); (■) Directorate-General for Foreign Policy for the Mediterranean, the Middle East and Africa; (■) Directorate-General for Foreign Policy for Asia and the Pacific; (■) Directorate-General for International Affairs of Terrorism, United Nations and Multilateral Organizations (disest. 25 Jun 2005); (■) Directorate-General for the United Nations, Human Rights and Multilateral Organizations (est. 25 Jun 2005); (■) Directorate-General for International Economic Relations; (■) Directorate-General for International Affairs of Terrorism, Non-Proliferation and Disarmament (est. 25 Jun 2005); (■) State Secretariat for the European Union; (■) General Secretariat for the European Union; (■) Directorate-General for Integration and Coordination of General and Economic Affairs of the European Union; (■) Directorate-General for Coordination of the Internal Market and other European Union Policies; (■) State Secretariat for International Cooperation; (■) Directorate-General for Planning and Evaluation of Development Policies (est. 25 Jun 2005); (■) State Secretariat for Ibero-America (est. 9 Sep 2006); (■) Directorate-General for Foreign Policy for Ibero-America (from 17 Sep 2006); (■) Directorate-General for Ibero-American Multilateral Organizations (est. 17 Sep 2006); (■) Undersecretariat of Foreign Affairs and Cooperation; (■) Technical General Secretariat; (■) Directorate-General for the Foreign Service; (■) Directorate-General for Consular Affairs and Assistance; (■) Introducer of Ambassadors; (■) Directorate-General for Communication Abroad					
=== Ministry of Justice ===
Ministry of Justice (Ministerio de Justicia)		Juan Fernando López Aguilar	18 April 2004	12 February 2007	PSOE	
Ministry of Justice (Ministerio de Justicia)		Mariano Fernández Bermejo	12 February 2007	14 April 2008	PSOE (Independent)	
Ministry of Justice (Ministerio de Justicia)	20 April 2004 – 16 April 2008: (■) State Secretariat for Justice; (■) Office of the Solicitor General of the State–Directorate of the State Legal Service; (■) Directorate-General for Registries and Notaries; (■) Directorate-General for Relations with the Administration of Justice; (■) Directorate-General for Religious Affairs; (■) Undersecretariat of Justice; (■) Technical General Secretariat; (■) Directorate-General for International Legal Cooperation					
=== Ministry of Defence ===
Ministry of Defence (Ministerio de Defensa)		José Bono	18 April 2004	11 April 2006	PSOE	
Ministry of Defence (Ministerio de Defensa)		José Antonio Alonso	11 April 2006	14 April 2008	PSOE (Independent)	
Ministry of Defence (Ministerio de Defensa)	20 April 2004 – 16 April 2008: (■) State Secretariat for Defence; (■) Directorate-General for Armament and Materiel; (■) Directorate-General for Economic Affairs; (■) Directorate-General for Infrastructure; (■) Undersecretariat of Defence; (■) Technical General Secretariat; (■) Directorate-General for Personnel; (■) Directorate-General for Military Recruitment and Teaching; (■) General Secretariat for Defence Policy; (■) Directorate-General for Defence Policy; (■) Directorate-General for Institutional Defence Relations; (■) Directorate-General for Defence Communication; (◆) Armed Forces; (■) Defence Staff–Chief of the Defence Staff; (■) Army–Chief of Staff of the Army; (■) Navy–Chief of Staff of the Navy; (■) Air Force–Chief of Staff of the Air Force; (◆) National Intelligence Centre; (■) State Secretariat–Directorate of the National Intelligence Centre; (■) General Secretariat of the National Intelligence Centre; (■) Technical Directorate for Resources; (■) Technical Directorate for Intelligence; (■) Technical Directorate for Intelligence Support (est. 24 May 2006)					
=== Ministry of Economy and Finance ===
Ministry of Economy and Finance (Ministerio de Economía y Hacienda)		Pedro Solbes	18 April 2004	14 April 2008	PSOE (Independent)	
Ministry of Economy and Finance (Ministerio de Economía y Hacienda)	20 April 2004 – 16 April 2008: (■) State Secretariat for Finance and Budgets; (■) General Secretariat for Finance; (■) Directorate-General for Taxes; (■) Directorate-General for the Cadastre; (■) Directorate-General for Territorial Financing (disest. 25 Jun 2005); (■) Directorate-General for Financial Coordination with the Autonomous Communities (est. 25 Jun 2005); (■) Directorate-General for Financial Coordination with the Local Entities (est. 25 Jun 2005); (■) Central Economic-Administrative Court; (■) General Secretariat for Budgets and Expenditure; (■) Directorate-General for Budgets; (■) Directorate-General for Personnel Costs and Public Pensions; (■) Directorate-General for Community Funds; (■) Office of the Comptroller General of the State Administration; (■) State Secretariat for Economy; (■) General Secretariat for Economic Policy and Competition Defence (est. 14 Mar 2006); (■) Directorate-General for Economic Policy (from 14 Mar 2006); (■) Directorate-General for Competition Defence (from 14 Mar 2006; disest. 30 Oct 2007); (■) Directorate-General for Economic Policy (until 14 Mar 2006); (■) Directorate-General for Competition Defence (until 14 Mar 2006); (■) Directorate-General for the Treasury and Financial Policy; (■) Directorate-General for Insurance and Pension Funds; (■) Directorate-General for International Financing; (■) Undersecretariat of Economy and Finance; (■) Technical General Secretariat; (■) Directorate-General for the State Heritage; (■) Inspectorate-General of the Ministry of Economy and Finance					
=== Ministry of the Interior ===
Ministry of the Interior (Ministerio del Interior)		José Antonio Alonso	18 April 2004	11 April 2006	PSOE (Independent)	
Ministry of the Interior (Ministerio del Interior)		Alfredo Pérez Rubalcaba	11 April 2006	14 April 2008	PSOE	
Ministry of the Interior (Ministerio del Interior)	20 April 2004 – 12 September 2006: (■) State Secretariat for Security; (■) Directorate-General of the Police; (■) Directorate-General of the Civil Guard; (■) Directorate-General for Security Infrastructure and Material; (■) Undersecretariat of the Interior; (■) Technical General Secretariat; (■) Directorate-General for Internal Policy; (■) Directorate-General for Penitentiary Institutions; (■) Directorate-General for Traffic; (■) Directorate-General for Civil Protection and Emergencies; 12 September 2006 – 16 April 2008: (■) State Secretariat for Security; (■) Directorate-General of the Police and the Civil Guard; (■) Directorate-General for Penitentiary Institutions; (■) Directorate-General for International Relations and Foreigners; (■) Undersecretariat of the Interior; (■) Technical General Secretariat; (■) Directorate-General for Internal Policy; (■) Directorate-General for Traffic; (■) Directorate-General for Civil Protection and Emergencies; (■) Directorate-General for Security Infrastructure and Material; (■) Directorate-General for Support to Victims of Terrorism					
=== Ministry of Development ===
Ministry of Development (Ministerio de Fomento)		Magdalena Álvarez	18 April 2004	14 April 2008	PSOE	
Ministry of Development (Ministerio de Fomento)	20 April 2004 – 16 April 2008: (■) State Secretariat for Infrastructure and Planning; (■) General Secretariat for Infrastructure; (■) Directorate-General for Roads; (■) Directorate-General for Railways; (■) Directorate-General for Territorial Planning and Coordination; (■) General Secretariat for Transport; (■) Directorate-General for Road Transport; (■) Directorate-General for the Merchant Marine; (■) Directorate-General for Civil Aviation; (■) Undersecretariat of Development; (■) Technical General Secretariat; (■) Directorate-General of the National Geographic Institute; (■) Directorate-General for Economic Programming					
=== Ministry of Education and Science ===
Ministry of Education and Science (Ministerio de Educación y Ciencia)		María Jesús San Segundo	18 April 2004	11 April 2006	PSOE (Independent)	
Ministry of Education and Science (Ministerio de Educación y Ciencia)		Mercedes Cabrera	11 April 2006	14 April 2008	PSOE (Independent)	
Ministry of Education and Science (Ministerio de Educación y Ciencia)	20 April 2004 – 16 April 2008: (■) State Secretariat for Universities and Research; (■) General Secretariat for Scientific and Technological Policy; (■) Directorate-General for Research; (■) Directorate-General for Technological Policy; (■) Directorate-General for Universities; (■) General Secretariat of the University Coordination Council (est. 3 Jun 2006); (■) Undersecretariat of Education and Science; (■) Technical General Secretariat; (■) General Secretariat for Education; (■) Directorate-General for Education, Vocational Training and Educational Innovation; (■) Directorate-General for Territorial Cooperation and High Inspection; (●) High Council for Sports; (■) President's Office of the High Council for Sports; (■) Directorate-General for Sports; (■) Directorate-General for Sports Infrastructure and Services (disest. 27 Nov 2004); (■) Directorate-General for Sports Infrastructure (est. 27 Nov 2004)					
=== Ministry of Labour and Social Affairs ===
Ministry of Labour and Social Affairs (Ministerio de Trabajo y Asuntos Sociales)		Jesús Caldera	18 April 2004	14 April 2008	PSOE	
Ministry of Labour and Social Affairs (Ministerio de Trabajo y Asuntos Sociales)	20 April 2004 – 16 April 2008: (■) State Secretariat for Social Security; (■) Directorate-General for Social Security Economic Management (disest. 4 Jul 2004); (■) Directorate-General for Social Security Management (est. 4 Jul 2004); (■) Office of the Comptroller General of the Social Security; (■) State Secretariat for Immigration and Emigration; (■) Directorate-General for Immigration; (■) Directorate-General for Immigrant Integration; (■) Directorate-General for Emigration; (■) State Secretariat for Social Services, Families and Disability; (■) Directorate-General for Social Services and Dependency; (■) Directorate-General for Families and Children; (■) Directorate-General for Coordination of Sector Policies on Disability; (■) Undersecretariat of Labour and Social Affairs; (■) Technical General Secretariat; (■) Directorate-General for Labour and Social Security Inspection; (■) General Secretariat for Employment; (■) Directorate-General for Labour; (■) Directorate-General for the Social Economy, Self-Employment and the European Social Fund; (■) General Secretariat for Equality Policies; (■) Special Government Delegation against Violence on Women (est. 9 Mar 2005)					
=== Ministry of Industry, Tourism and Trade ===
Ministry of Industry, Tourism and Trade (Ministerio de Industria, Turismo y Comercio)		José Montilla	18 April 2004	8 September 2006	PSOE (PSC–PSOE)	
Ministry of Industry, Tourism and Trade (Ministerio de Industria, Turismo y Comercio)		Joan Clos	8 September 2006	14 April 2008	PSOE (PSC–PSOE)	
Ministry of Industry, Tourism and Trade (Ministerio de Industria, Turismo y Comercio)	20 April 2004 – 16 April 2008: (■) State Secretariat for Tourism and Trade; (■) General Secretariat for Tourism; (■) General Secretariat for Foreign Trade; (■) Directorate-General for Trade and Investments; (■) Directorate-General for Trade Policy; (■) State Secretariat for Telecommunications and the Information Society; (■) Directorate-General for Telecommunications and Information Technologies; (■) Directorate-General for the Development of the Information Society; (■) Undersecretariat of Industry, Tourism and Trade; (■) Technical General Secretariat; (■) General Secretariat for Industry; (■) Directorate-General for Industrial Development; (■) Directorate-General for Small and Medium-sized Enterprises Policy; (■) General Secretariat for Energy; (■) Directorate-General for Energy Policy and Mines					
=== Ministry of Agriculture, Fisheries and Food ===
Ministry of Agriculture, Fisheries and Food (Ministerio de Agricultura, Pesca y Alimentación)		Elena Espinosa	18 April 2004	14 April 2008	PSOE	
Ministry of Agriculture, Fisheries and Food (Ministerio de Agricultura, Pesca y Alimentación)	20 April 2004 – 16 April 2008: (■) Undersecretariat of Agriculture, Fisheries and Food; (■) Technical General Secretariat; (■) General Secretariat for Agriculture and Food; (■) Directorate-General for Agriculture; (■) Directorate-General for Livestock; (■) Directorate-General for Rural Development; (■) Directorate-General for Agrifood Industry and Food; (■) General Secretariat for Maritime Fisheries; (■) Directorate-General for Fishery Resources; (■) Directorate-General for Fishing Structures and Markets					
=== Ministry of the Presidency ===
Ministry of the Presidency (Ministerio de la Presidencia)		Mª Teresa Fernández de la Vega	18 April 2004	14 April 2008	PSOE (Independent)	
Ministry of the Presidency (Ministerio de la Presidencia)	20 April 2004 – 16 April 2008: (■) State Secretariat for Relations with the Cortes; (■) Directorate-General for Relations with the Cortes; (■) State Secretariat for Press; (■) Directorate-General for Information Coordination; (■) Directorate-General for Communication of the National Area (disest. 12 Jun 2004); (■) Directorate-General for Communication of the International Area (disest. 12 Jun 2004); (■) Directorate-General for National Information (est. 12 Jun 2004); (■) Directorate-General for International Information (est. 12 Jun 2004); (■) Undersecretariat of the Presidency; (■) Technical General Secretariat; (■) Directorate-General of the Government Secretariat; (■) Directorate-General for Human Resources, Services and Infrastructure; (■) Centre for the Prevention and Fight against Maritime and Coastal Pollution (est. 16 Nov 2004)					
=== Ministry of Public Administrations ===
Ministry of Public Administrations (Ministerio de Administraciones; Públicas)		Jordi Sevilla	18 April 2004	9 July 2007	PSOE	
Ministry of Public Administrations (Ministerio de Administraciones; Públicas)		Elena Salgado	9 July 2007	14 April 2008	PSOE (Independent)	
Ministry of Public Administrations (Ministerio de Administraciones; Públicas)	20 April 2004 – 16 April 2008: (■) State Secretariat for Territorial Cooperation; (■) Directorate-General for Regional Cooperation; (■) Directorate-General for Regional Development (est. 25 Jun 2005); (■) Directorate-General for Local Cooperation; (■) Undersecretariat of Public Administrations; (■) Technical General Secretariat; (■) Directorate-General for Human Resources, Economic Programming and Peripheral Administration; (■) General Secretariat for Public Administration; (■) Directorate-General for the Civil Service; (■) Directorate-General for Administrative Modernization; (■) Directorate-General for Services Inspection, Evaluation and Quality (disest. 16 Jan 2007); (■) Directorate-General for Services Organization and Inspection (est. 16 Jan 2007)					
=== Ministry of Culture ===
Ministry of Culture (Ministerio de Cultura)		Carmen Calvo	18 April 2004	9 July 2007	PSOE	
Ministry of Culture (Ministerio de Cultura)		César Antonio Molina	9 July 2007	14 April 2008	PSOE (Independent)	
Ministry of Culture (Ministerio de Cultura)	20 April 2004 – 16 April 2008: (■) Undersecretariat of Culture; (■) Technical General Secretariat; (■) Directorate-General for Fine Arts and Cultural Property; (■) Directorate-General for Books, Archives and Libraries; (■) Directorate-General for Cultural Cooperation and Communication					
=== Ministry of Health and Consumer Affairs ===
Ministry of Health and Consumer Affairs (Ministerio de Sanidad y Consumo)		Elena Salgado	18 April 2004	9 July 2007	PSOE (Independent)	
Ministry of Health and Consumer Affairs (Ministerio de Sanidad y Consumo)		Bernat Soria	9 July 2007	14 April 2008	PSOE (Independent)	
Ministry of Health and Consumer Affairs (Ministerio de Sanidad y Consumo)	20 April 2004 – 16 April 2008: (■) Undersecretariat of Health and Consumer Affairs; (■) Technical General Secretariat; (■) Directorate-General for Human Resources and Economic-Budgetary Services; (■) Directorate-General for Pharmacy and Health Products; (■) Directorate-General for Consumer Affairs and Citizen Services; (■) General Secretariat for Health; (■) Directorate-General for Public Health; (■) Directorate-General for Cohesion of the National Health System and High Inspection; (■) National Health System Quality Agency; (■) Government Delegation for the National Plan on Drugs					
=== Ministry of Environment ===
Ministry of Environment (Ministerio de Medio Ambiente)		Cristina Narbona	18 April 2004	14 April 2008	PSOE	
Ministry of Environment (Ministerio de Medio Ambiente)	20 April 2004 – 16 April 2008: (■) Undersecretariat of Environment; (■) Technical General Secretariat; (■) General Secretariat for Territory and Biodiversity; (■) Directorate-General for Biodiversity; (■) Directorate-General for Water; (■) Directorate-General for Coasts; (■) General Secretariat for Pollution Prevention and Climate Change; (■) Directorate-General for Environmental Quality and Evaluation; (■) Directorate-General of the National Institute of Meteorology (disest. 15 Feb 2008); (■) Directorate-General of the Spanish Office for Climate Change (est. 22 Nov 2006)					
=== Ministry of Housing ===
Ministry of Housing (Ministerio de Vivienda)		María Antonia Trujillo	18 April 2004	9 July 2007	PSOE	
Ministry of Housing (Ministerio de Vivienda)		Carme Chacón	9 July 2007	14 April 2008	PSOE (PSC–PSOE)	
Ministry of Housing (Ministerio de Vivienda)	20 April – 27 July 2004: (■) Undersecretariat of Housing; (■) Technical General Secretariat; (■) Directorate-General for Architecture and Housing Policy; (■) Directorate-General for Urbanism and Soil Policy; 27 July 2004 – 16 April 2008: (■) Undersecretariat of Housing; (■) Technical General Secretariat; (■) General Secretariat for Housing; (■) Directorate-General for Architecture and Housing Policy; (■) Directorate-General for Urbanism and Soil Policy					
=== Spokesperson of the Government ===
Spokesperson of the Government (Portavoz del Gobierno)		Mª Teresa Fernández de la Vega	18 April 2004	14 April 2008	PSOE (Independent)	

== Notes ==
Preceded by Aznar II	Government of Spain; 2004–2008	Succeeded by Zapatero II
