= Leadership opinion polling for the 2011 Spanish general election =

In the run up to the 2011 Spanish general election, various organisations carried out opinion polling to gauge the opinions that voters hold towards political leaders. Results of such polls are displayed in this article. The date range for these opinion polls is from the previous general election, held on 9 March 2008, to the day the next election was held, on 20 November 2011.

== Preferred prime minister ==
The table below lists opinion polling on leader preferences to become prime minister.

=== Rubalcaba vs. Rajoy ===
Polling firm/Commissioner	Fieldwork date	Sample size			Other/ None/ Not care	Question	Lead
Polling firm/Commissioner	Fieldwork date	Sample size	Rubalcaba PSOE	Rajoy PP	Other/ None/ Not care	Question	Lead
GESOP/El Periódico	7–12 Nov 2011	2,070	33.7	44.7	21.6		11.0
Opinión 2000/Cadena SER	9–10 Nov 2011	1,000	30.8	41.1	17.1	11.0	10.3
Noxa/La Vanguardia	7–10 Nov 2011	1,275	31.0	44.0	22.0	3.0	13.0
TNS Demoscopia/CEMOP	2–7 Nov 2011	1,505	42.2	44.5	10.2	3.2	2.3
CIS	6–23 Oct 2011	17,236	36.9	38.8	18.7	5.5	1.9
Obradoiro de Socioloxía/Público	17–20 Oct 2011	1,800	34.3	36.7	22.9	6.0	2.4
Metroscopia/El País	11–13 Oct 2011	1,500	36.0	43.0	–	21.0	7.0
Noxa/La Vanguardia	28 Sep–4 Oct 2011	1,272	37.0	44.0	17.0	2.0	7.0
GESOP/El Periódico	19–22 Sep 2011	1,000	33.7	42.5	23.8		8.8
Opinión 2000/Cadena SER	7–8 Sep 2011	1,000	34.1	39.1	13.6	13.2	5.0
Metroscopia/El País	7–8 Sep 2011	1,002	40.0	35.0	–	25.0	5.0
Metroscopia/El País	27–28 Jul 2011	1,203	45.0	37.0	–	18.0	8.0
CIS	4–11 Jul 2011	2,475	39.9	31.9	19.4	8.8	8.0
Metroscopia/El País	29–30 Jun 2011	1,001	44.0	36.0	–	20.0	8.0
Opinión 2000/Cadena SER	20–21 Jun 2011	1,000	35.1	39.3	12.9	12.7	4.2
Metroscopia/El País	1–2 Jun 2011	1,001	42.0	36.0	–	22.0	6.0
GESOP/El Periódico	30 May–1 Jun 2011	1,000	40.8	35.4	23.8		5.4
Obradoiro de Socioloxía/Público	11–19 Apr 2011	2,005	47.3	31.0	21.7		16.3
Opinión 2000/Cadena SER	6–7 Apr 2011	1,000	44.7	39.1	12.8	3.4	5.6
InvyMark/laSexta	2 Apr 2011	?	57.1	31.6	–	11.3	25.5
Obradoiro de Socioloxía/Público	21–24 Mar 2011	1,201	44.3	34.1	21.6		10.2

=== Chacón vs. Rajoy ===
Polling firm/Commissioner	Fieldwork date	Sample size			Other/ None/ Not care	Question	Lead
Polling firm/Commissioner	Fieldwork date	Sample size	Chacón PSOE	Rajoy PP	Other/ None/ Not care	Question	Lead
Obradoiro de Socioloxía/Público	11–19 Apr 2011	2,005	46.9	30.5	22.6		16.4
Opinión 2000/Cadena SER	6–7 Apr 2011	1,000	45.8	39.8	10.8	3.7	6.0
InvyMark/laSexta	2 Apr 2011	?	56.9	31.9	–	11.2	25.0
Obradoiro de Socioloxía/Público	21–24 Mar 2011	1,201	39.3	33.7	27.0		5.6

=== Zapatero vs. Rajoy ===
Polling firm/Commissioner	Fieldwork date	Sample size			Other/ None/ Not care	Question	Lead
Polling firm/Commissioner	Fieldwork date	Sample size	Rodríguez Zapatero PSOE	Rajoy PP	Other/ None/ Not care	Question	Lead
Opina/Cadena SER	1–2 Feb 2011	1,000	32.7	40.4	17.2	9.7	7.7
Opina/Cadena SER	12–13 Jan 2011	1,000	33.2	36.9	20.6	10.3	3.7
GESOP/El Periódico	15–17 Dec 2010	1,000	28.2	39.5	32.3		11.3
Opina/Cadena SER	28–29 Oct 2010	1,000	37.1	39.1	15.0	8.8	2.0
Opina/Cadena SER	7–8 Oct 2010	1,000	31.1	38.5	18.8	11.6	7.4
Opina/Cadena SER	30–31 Aug 2010	1,000	33.4	36.8	19.3	10.6	3.4
Metroscopia/El País	2 Jun 2010	506	37.0	38.0	23.0	3.0	1.0
GESOP/El Periódico	17–21 May 2010	1,500	31.3	34.3	34.4		3.0
GESOP/El Periódico	14–17 Dec 2009	1,500	38.1	32.4	29.5		5.7
GESOP/El Periódico	11–15 May 2009	1,500	45.3	34.3	20.4		11.0
GESOP/El Periódico	12–13 Feb 2009	800	48.6	26.3	25.1		22.3
GESOP/El Periódico	20–24 Oct 2008	1,500	46.5	29.5	24.0		17.0
Opina/Cadena SER	26 Jun 2008	1,000	40.8	33.9	12.6	12.7	6.9
Opina/Cadena SER	12 Jun 2008	1,000	44.3	31.0	17.0	7.7	13.3
GESOP/El Periódico	26–30 May 2008	1,500	52.6	24.7	22.7		27.9

== Predicted prime minister ==
The table below lists opinion polling on the perceived likelihood for each leader to become prime minister.

=== Rubalcaba vs. Rajoy ===
Polling firm/Commissioner	Fieldwork date	Sample size			Other/ None/ Not care	Question	Lead
Polling firm/Commissioner	Fieldwork date	Sample size	Rubalcaba PSOE	Rajoy PP	Other/ None/ Not care	Question	Lead
Opinión 2000/Cadena SER	9–10 Nov 2011	1,000	5.1	86.1	0.9	7.9	81.0
Obradoiro de Socioloxía/Público	17–20 Oct 2011	1,800	4.7	85.0	0.4	9.8	80.3
Celeste-Tel/Terra	3–8 Oct 2011	1,357	12.7	75.2	12.1		62.5
Opinión 2000/Cadena SER	7–8 Sep 2011	1,000	8.4	79.0	0.6	12.0	70.6
Opinión 2000/Cadena SER	20–21 Jun 2011	1,000	11.6	76.1	1.6	10.7	64.5
Metroscopia/El País	7 Jan 2010	504	36.0	39.0	5.0	20.0	3.0

=== Chacón vs. Rajoy ===
Polling firm/Commissioner	Fieldwork date	Sample size			Other/ None/ Not care	Question	Lead
Polling firm/Commissioner	Fieldwork date	Sample size	Chacón PSOE	Rajoy PP	Other/ None/ Not care	Question	Lead
Metroscopia/El País	7 Jan 2010	504	34.0	48.0	2.0	16.0	12.0

=== Zapatero vs. Rajoy ===
Polling firm/Commissioner	Fieldwork date	Sample size			Other/ None/ Not care	Question	Lead
Polling firm/Commissioner	Fieldwork date	Sample size	Rodríguez Zapatero PSOE	Rajoy PP	Other/ None/ Not care	Question	Lead
Opina/Cadena SER	1–2 Feb 2011	1,000	15.2	66.6	4.4	13.8	51.4
Opina/Cadena SER	12–13 Jan 2011	1,000	17.5	66.1	3.8	12.6	48.6
Opina/Cadena SER	28–29 Oct 2010	1,000	25.5	59.9	1.7	12.9	34.4
Opina/Cadena SER	7–8 Oct 2010	1,000	18.6	65.6	2.0	13.8	47.0
Opina/Cadena SER	30–31 Aug 2010	1,000	23.4	57.9	3.1	15.6	34.5
Metroscopia/El País	28–29 Oct 2009	501	38.0	44.0	18.0		6.0
Opina/Cadena SER	26 Jun 2008	1,000	51.5	29.4	2.0	17.1	22.1
Opina/Cadena SER	12 Jun 2008	1,000	61.6	19.7	1.9	16.8	41.9

=== Rubalcaba vs. Gallardón ===
Polling firm/Commissioner	Fieldwork date	Sample size			Other/ None/ Not care	Question	Lead
Polling firm/Commissioner	Fieldwork date	Sample size	Rubalcaba PSOE	Ruiz- Gallardón PP	Other/ None/ Not care	Question	Lead
Metroscopia/El País	3–4 Feb 2010	500	24.0	54.0	4.0	18.0	30.0

=== Zapatero vs. Gallardón ===
Polling firm/Commissioner	Fieldwork date	Sample size			Other/ None/ Not care	Question	Lead
Polling firm/Commissioner	Fieldwork date	Sample size	Rodríguez Zapatero PSOE	Ruiz- Gallardón PP	Other/ None/ Not care	Question	Lead
Metroscopia/El País	28–29 Oct 2009	501	28.0	56.0	16.0		28.0

=== Zapatero vs. Aguirre ===
Polling firm/Commissioner	Fieldwork date	Sample size			Other/ None/ Not care	Question	Lead
Polling firm/Commissioner	Fieldwork date	Sample size	Rodríguez Zapatero PSOE	Aguirre PP	Other/ None/ Not care	Question	Lead
Metroscopia/El País	28–29 Oct 2009	501	53.0	33.0	14.0		20.0

== Leader ratings ==
The table below lists opinion polling on leader ratings, on a 0–10 scale: 0 would stand for a "terrible" rating, whereas 10 would stand for "excellent".

Polling firm/Commissioner	Fieldwork date	Sample size						
Polling firm/Commissioner	Fieldwork date	Sample size	Zapatero PSOE	Rubalcaba PSOE	Rajoy PP	Llamazares IU	Lara IU	Díez UPyD
GESOP/El Periódico	7–12 Nov 2011	2,070	–	4.7	5.2	–	4.1	5.0
Opinión 2000/Cadena SER	9–10 Nov 2011	1,000	3.05	4.07	4.18	–	–	–
Noxa/La Vanguardia	7–10 Nov 2011	1,275	–	4.90	4.85	–	4.13	4.65
Sigma Dos/El Mundo	28 Oct–10 Nov 2011	3,000	–	4.26	4.58	–	–	4.41
Sondaxe/La Voz de Galicia	28 Oct–9 Nov 2011	?	–	4.86	4.42	–	–	–
Metroscopia/El País	18 Oct–8 Nov 2011	9,675	–	4.7	5.0	–	–	–
TNS Demoscopia/CEMOP	2–7 Nov 2011	1,505	3.60	4.60	4.34	–	–	–
Ipsos/La Nueva España	1–6 Nov 2011	3,935	–	4.79	4.69	–	–	–
Invymark/laSexta	31 Oct–4 Nov 2011	?	–	4.41	4.20	–	–	–
Metroscopia/El País	24–27 Oct 2011	1,500	3.4	4.5	4.7	–	–	5.0
CIS	6–23 Oct 2011	17,236	3.05	4.54	4.43	–	3.91	4.95
Invymark/laSexta	18–21 Oct 2011	?	–	4.44	4.42	–	–	–
Obradoiro de Socioloxía/Público	17–20 Oct 2011	1,800	–	4.7	4.7	–	4.2	5.1
Sigma Dos/El Mundo	7–20 Oct 2011	3,000	3.61	4.24	4.77	–	3.37	4.29
Intercampo/GETS	15 Sep–17 Oct 2011	1,724	–	4.66	3.25	–	3.61	3.69
Metroscopia/El País	11–13 Oct 2011	1,500	3.3	4.3	4.7	–	3.9	4.9
Celeste-Tel/Terra	3–8 Oct 2011	1,357	–	4.5	3.9	–	3.2	4.0
Noxa/La Vanguardia	28 Sep–4 Oct 2011	1,272	–	4.9	4.6	–	3.9	4.8
CEMOP	26 Sep–4 Oct 2011	800	3.7	4.5	4.5	–	–	–
Sigma Dos/El Mundo	27–30 Sep 2011	2,000	3.98	4.47	4.39	–	3.70	4.34
NC Report/La Razón	21–28 Sep 2011	1,000	–	4.4	4.5	–	3.6	4.5
GESOP/El Periódico	19–22 Sep 2011	1,000	–	4.6	5.0	–	3.8	5.0
Opinión 2000/Cadena SER	7–8 Sep 2011	1,000	3.14	4.32	3.93	–	–	–
Sigma Dos/El Mundo	29 Aug–1 Sep 2011	1,000	3.86	4.46	4.18	–	3.54	4.22
NC Report/La Razón	28 Aug 2011	?	2.7	4.3	4.4	–	–	4.4
DYM/ABC	2–3 Aug 2011	1,076	–	4.8	4.1	–	3.7	4.7
NC Report/La Razón	29–30 Jul 2011	1,000	–	4.3	4.4	–	3.3	4.4
CIS	4–11 Jul 2011	2,475	3.47	4.62	3.58	–	3.03	3.95
GAD/COPE	1–5 Jul 2011	504	3.6	–	3.9	–	–	–
ASEP	1 Jun–1 Jul 2011	1,110	2.8	3.5	3.1	–	2.8	3.5
Opinión 2000/Cadena SER	20–21 Jun 2011	1,000	3.00	4.09	3.80	–	–	–
GAD/COPE	3–7 Jun 2011	501	3.8	–	4.2	–	–	–
Sigma Dos/El Mundo	1–2 Jun 2011	1,000	3.95	4.61	4.18	–	3.71	4.23
NC Report/La Razón	29 May–2 Jun 2011	1,000	3.0	4.2	4.3	–	3.6	4.4
GESOP/El Periódico	30 May–1 Jun 2011	1,000	3.6	4.9	4.3	–	4.4	4.8
ASEP	1–31 May 2011	1,108	3.5	–	3.5	–	3.7	4.3
Ikerfel/Vocento	4–22 Apr 2011	45,635	3.1	–	3.0	–	–	–
NC Report/La Razón	18–20 Apr 2011	1,000	3.2	–	4.1	–	3.2	4.2
Obradoiro de Socioloxía/Público	11–19 Apr 2011	2,005	3.6	–	4.0	–	–	–
CIS	1–8 Apr 2011	2,463	3.41	–	3.46	–	2.96	3.86
Opinión 2000/Cadena SER	6–7 Apr 2011	1,000	3.40	–	3.91	–	–	–
Sigma Dos/El Mundo	5–7 Apr 2011	1,000	3.93	–	4.10	–	3.62	4.34
GAD/COPE	1–5 Apr 2011	500	3.8	–	4.1	–	–	–
NC Report/La Razón	2 Apr 2011	1,000	3.2	–	4.0	–	–	4.1
Obradoiro de Socioloxía/Público	21–24 Mar 2011	1,201	3.5	–	4.3	–	4.0	4.7
ASEP	1 Feb–2 Mar 2011	1,189	3.1	–	3.5	–	3.6	4.3
Obradoiro de Socioloxía/Público	21–25 Feb 2011	1,982	3.5	–	4.3	–	3.8	4.7
NC Report/La Razón	17–23 Feb 2011	1,000	3.3	–	4.0	–	–	–
TNS Demoscopia/Antena 3	21–22 Feb 2011	?	3.3	–	3.4	–	–	–
Opina/Cadena SER	1–2 Feb 2011	1,000	3.33	–	3.77	–	–	–
Obradoiro de Socioloxía/Público	17–21 Jan 2011	2,082	3.2	–	4.1	–	3.8	4.5
CIS	7–16 Jan 2011	2,478	3.30	–	3.25	–	3.04	3.75
Opina/Cadena SER	12–13 Jan 2011	1,000	3.35	–	3.63	–	–	–
DYM/ABC	20–30 Dec 2010	1,058	3.1	–	3.6	–	–	–
GESOP/El Periódico	15–17 Dec 2010	1,000	3.5	–	4.2	–	4.0	4.7
Obradoiro de Socioloxía/Público	13–16 Dec 2010	1,600	3.3	–	4.1	–	3.6	4.5
Obradoiro de Socioloxía/Público	2–11 Nov 2010	2,402	3.4	–	4.1	–	3.8	4.7
ASEP	1–31 Oct 2010	1,096	3.1	–	3.1	–	3.0	4.0
Opina/Cadena SER	28–29 Oct 2010	1,000	3.39	–	3.70	–	–	–
Noxa/La Vanguardia	25–28 Oct 2010	1,000	4.0	–	3.9	–	3.8	–
CIS	4–14 Oct 2010	2,475	3.46	–	3.42	–	3.08	3.89
Opina/Cadena SER	7–8 Oct 2010	1,000	3.38	–	3.64	–	–	–
Obradoiro de Socioloxía/Público	20 Sep–7 Oct 2010	2,329	3.3	–	4.2	–	3.7	4.8
Opina/Cadena SER	30–31 Aug 2010	1,000	3.55	–	3.67	–	–	–
CIS	15–22 Jul 2010	2,472	3.48	–	3.14	–	2.85	3.69
NC Report/La Razón	25 May–9 Jul 2010	2,000	3.7	–	4.3	–	3.4	4.9
Obradoiro de Socioloxía/Público	17 May–9 Jun 2010	?	3.4	–	3.9	–	3.7	4.5
Obradoiro de Socioloxía/Público	20 Apr–19 May 2010	4,002	3.6	–	4.0	–	3.8	4.6
NC Report/La Razón	26–30 Apr 2010	1,000	4.0	–	3.9	–	3.5	4.2
CIS	6–14 Apr 2010	2,479	3.71	–	3.09	–	3.01	3.71
NC Report/La Razón	31 Mar 2010	1,000	4.0	–	3.9	–	3.3	4.4
NC Report/La Razón	24–26 Feb 2010	1,000	4.1	–	3.9	–	3.3	4.2
NC Report/La Razón	25 Jan–6 Feb 2010	1,000	4.1	–	4.0	–	3.3	4.3
Obradoiro de Socioloxía/Público	11–27 Jan 2010	3,206	4.0	–	4.2	–	4.0	5.0
CIS	9–21 Jan 2010	2,477	3.98	–	3.50	–	3.08	4.08
NC Report/La Razón	8 Jan 2010	?	4.2	–	4.1	–	3.4	4.4
ASEP	1–31 Dec 2009	1,118	4.4	–	3.5	–	3.8	4.6
Noxa/La Vanguardia	28–29 Dec 2009	807	4.6	–	3.8	–	3.9	–
Obradoiro de Socioloxía/Públicoo	9 Nov–2 Dec 2009	3,201	4.1	–	4.1	–	3.9	5.0
ASEP	1–30 Nov 2009	1,215	4.0	–	3.4	–	3.7	4.5
NC Report/La Razón	23–26 Nov 2009	1,000	4.2	–	4.0	–	3.5	4.5
Obradoiro de Socioloxía/Público	13 Oct–4 Nov 2009	3,204	4.0	–	4.1	–	3.8	4.8
ASEP	1–31 Oct 2009	1,101	3.7	–	3.4	–	3.3	4.4
NC Report/La Razón	28–30 Oct 2009	1,000	4.3	–	3.8	–	3.6	4.6
CIS	7–14 Oct 2009	2,478	4.11	–	3.61	–	3.09	4.08
Obradoiro de Socioloxía/Público	16 Sep–7 Oct 2009	3,202	4.0	–	4.0	–	3.9	4.8
Noxa/La Vanguardia	28 Sep–1 Oct 2009	1,000	4.4	–	4.2	–	3.8	–
ASEP	1–30 Sep 2009	1,100	3.8	–	3.3	–	3.6	4.3
ASEP	1–31 Jul 2009	1,103	4.0	–	3.6	–	3.6	4.7
CIS	7–13 Jul 2009	2,482	4.27	–	3.55	–	3.12	4.12
NC Report/La Razón	1–3 Jul 2009	1,000	4.4	–	4.2	–	3.7	4.8
ASEP	1–30 Jun 2009	1,100	4.1	–	3.5	–	3.6	4.8
Obradoiro de Socioloxía/Público	25 May–17 Jun 2009	3,200	4.4	–	4.1	–	3.9	5.1
ASEP	1–30 May 2009	1,101	4.4	–	3.7	–	4.1	4.9
Noxa/La Vanguardia	25–28 May 2009	1,000	4.9	–	4.0	–	3.8	4.9
Obradoiro de Socioloxía/Público	27 Apr–20 May 2009	3,206	4.4	–	4.1	–	4.0	5.1
ASEP	1 Apr–1 May 2009	1,103	4.4	–	3.5	–	3.8	4.6
NC Report/La Razón	27–30 Apr 2009	1,000	4.5	–	4.4	–	–	4.8
Obradoiro de Socioloxía/Público	24 Mar–22 Apr 2009	3,204	4.5	–	4.4	–	3.9	4.9
CIS	14–21 Apr 2009	2,481	4.43	–	3.54	–	3.31	4.28
ASEP	1–31 Mar 2009	1,103	4.5	–	3.6	–	3.9	4.6
NC Report/La Razón	28 Mar 2009	?	4.60	–	4.44	–	3.62	4.78
Obradoiro de Socioloxía/Público	25 Feb–18 Mar 2009	3,205	4.4	–	4.4	–	3.8	4.8
ASEP	23 Feb–1 Mar 2009	1,103	4.4	–	3.3	–	3.6	4.4
NC Report/La Razón	26–30 Jan 2009	1,000	4.7	–	4.3	–	–	4.8
Obradoiro de Socioloxía/Público	10–20 Jan 2009	1,600	4.5	–	4.0	–	4.2	5.0
CIS	9–19 Jan 2009	2,482	4.55	–	3.51	–	3.49	4.43
NC Report/La Razón	29 Dec–2 Jan 2009	1,000	4.8	–	4.4	–	3.7	4.7
Sigma Dos/El Mundo	22–26 Dec 2008	1,000	5.16	–	4.34	3.66	–	4.73
Noxa/La Vanguardia	15–19 Dec 2008	1,000	5.3	–	4.4	3.5	–	4.4
Obradoiro de Socioloxía/Público	25 Nov–18 Dec 2008	3,198	4.9	–	4.4	4.0	–	4.9
NC Report/La Razón	24–27 Nov 2008	1,000	4.8	–	4.6	3.6	–	4.7
DYM/ABC	13–20 Nov 2008	1,012	5.1	–	4.0	–	–	–
Obradoiro de Socioloxía/Público	27 Oct–20 Nov 2008	3,203	4.7	–	4.3	3.8	–	5.1
NC Report/La Razón	27–30 Oct 2008	1,000	4.8	–	4.7	–	–	4.6
GESOP/El Periódico	20–24 Oct 2008	1,500	5.1	–	4.4	4.2	–	–
Obradoiro de Socioloxía/Público	29 Sep–23 Oct 2008	3,203	4.9	–	4.3	4.0	–	4.8
CIS	1–9 Oct 2008	2,481	4.73	–	3.88	3.11	–	–
Invymark/laSexta	29 Sep–3 Oct 2008	?	4.93	–	4.31	–	–	–
NC Report/La Razón	29 Sep–2 Oct 2008	1,000	4.94	–	4.68	3.97	–	4.58
Obradoiro de Socioloxía/Público	8–25 Sep 2008	3,171	4.8	–	4.7	4.0	–	–
Noxa/La Vanguardia	15–18 Sep 2008	1,000	5.2	–	4.6	3.8	–	4.8
CIS	7–13 Jul 2008	2,468	4.75	–	3.99	3.29	–	–
Metroscopia/El País	9–10 Jul 2008	703	4.8	–	4.3	3.9	–	–
Opina/Cadena SER	26 Jun 2008	1,000	4.81	–	4.60	3.79	–	–
ASEP	9–15 Jun 2008	1,206	4.5	–	3.5	3.5	–	–
Opina/Cadena SER	12 Jun 2008	1,000	4.76	–	4.23	3.81	–	–
Sigma Dos/El Mundo	10–12 Jun 2008	1,000	4.98	–	4.90	4.03	–	5.31
GESOP/El Periódico	26–30 May 2008	1,500	5.6	–	4.4	4.2	–	–
ASEP	12–18 May 2008	1,210	5.1	–	3.7	3.8	–	–
CIS	24–30 Apr 2008	2,459	5.58	–	4.24	3.34	–	–
ASEP	14–20 Apr 2008	1,204	5.0	–	3.9	3.5	–	–

== Approval ratings ==
The tables below list the public approval ratings of the leaders and leading candidates of the main political parties in Spain.

=== Alfredo Pérez Rubalcaba ===
Polling firm/Commissioner	Fieldwork date	Sample size	Alfredo Pérez Rubalcaba (PSOE)			
Polling firm/Commissioner	Fieldwork date	Sample size	check	X mark	Question	Net
Simple Lógica	2–10 Nov 2011	1,009	30.6	58.1	11.3	−27.5
Ipsos/La Nueva España	1–6 Nov 2011	3,935	59.2	36.8	4.0	+22.4
Simple Lógica	3–10 Oct 2011	?	27.0	?	?	−?
Simple Lógica	1–8 Sep 2011	1,022	29.8	?	?	−?
Simple Lógica	2–10 Aug 2011	1,014	30.6	?	?	−?
Simple Lógica	4–12 Jul 2011	?	33.3	?	?	−?
Metroscopia/El País	29–30 Jun 2011	1,001	52.0	41.0	7.0	+11.0
Simple Lógica	1–6 Jun 2011	1,000	37.0	?	?	−?

=== José Luis Rodríguez Zapatero ===
Polling firm/Commissioner	Fieldwork date	Sample size	José Luis Rodríguez Zapatero (PSOE)			
Polling firm/Commissioner	Fieldwork date	Sample size	check	X mark	Question	Net
Opinión 2000/Cadena SER	9–10 Nov 2011	1,000	22.6	74.0	3.4	−51.4
Simple Lógica	2–10 Nov 2011	1,009	19.3	71.8	8.9	−52.5
Simple Lógica	3–10 Oct 2011	?	18.5	?	?	−?
Opinión 2000/Cadena SER	7–8 Sep 2011	1,000	24.9	70.1	5.0	−45.2
Simple Lógica	1–8 Sep 2011	1,022	18.0	?	?	−?
Simple Lógica	2–10 Aug 2011	1,014	16.1	?	?	−?
Metroscopia/El País	27–28 Jul 2011	1,203	24.0	71.0	5.0	−47.0
Simple Lógica	4–12 Jul 2011	?	20.2	?	?	−?
Metroscopia/El País	29–30 Jun 2011	1,001	26.0	68.0	6.0	−42.0
Opinión 2000/Cadena SER	20–21 Jun 2011	1,000	21.1	75.0	3.9	−53.9
Simple Lógica	1–6 Jun 2011	1,000	22.6	?	?	−?
Metroscopia/El País	1–2 Jun 2011	1,001	24.0	71.0	5.0	−47.0
Simple Lógica	3–13 May 2011	1,016	21.5	?	?	−?
Metroscopia/El País	27–28 Apr 2011	1,200	28.0	67.0	5.0	−39.0
Opinión 2000/Cadena SER	6–7 Apr 2011	1,000	28.2	66.9	4.9	−38.7
Metroscopia/El País	30–31 Mar 2011	1,004	27.0	67.0	6.0	−40.0
Obradoiro de Socioloxía/Público	21–24 Mar 2011	1,201	26.1	63.8	10.1	−37.7
Metroscopia/El País	2–3 Mar 2011	1,004	21.0	72.0	7.0	−51.0
Obradoiro de Socioloxía/Público	21–25 Feb 2011	1,982	26.0	64.7	9.3	−38.7
Metroscopia/El País	2–3 Feb 2011	1,005	25.0	69.0	6.0	−44.0
Opina/Cadena SER	1–2 Feb 2011	1,000	25.1	70.7	4.2	−45.6
Obradoiro de Socioloxía/Público	17–21 Jan 2011	2,082	22.0	68.7	9.3	−46.7
Opina/Cadena SER	12–13 Jan 2011	1,000	24.4	71.4	4.2	−47.0
Metroscopia/El País	3–4 Jan 2011	1,023	25.0	68.0	7.0	−43.0
Obradoiro de Socioloxía/Público	13–16 Dec 2010	1,600	22.4	65.0	12.6	−42.6
Metroscopia/El País	1–2 Dec 2010	1,000	27.0	69.0	4.0	−42.0
Obradoiro de Socioloxía/Público	2–11 Nov 2010	2,402	24.5	65.2	10.3	−40.7
Metroscopia/El País	2–4 Nov 2010	1,000	29.0	68.0	3.0	−39.0
Opina/Cadena SER	28–29 Oct 2010	1,000	27.9	67.4	4.7	−39.5
Opina/Cadena SER	7–8 Oct 2010	1,000	21.6	74.0	4.4	−52.4
NC Report/La Razón	4–7 Oct 2010	1,000	22.0	71.9	6.1	−49.9
Obradoiro de Socioloxía/Público	20 Sep–7 Oct 2010	2,329	22.3	69.3	8.5	−47.0
Metroscopia/El País	30 Sep 2010	500	22.0	75.0	3.0	−53.0
NC Report/La Razón	6–10 Sep 2010	1,000	23.8	68.1	8.1	−44.3
Metroscopia/El País	1–2 Sep 2010	500	31.0	65.0	4.0	−34.0
Opina/Cadena SER	30–31 Aug 2010	1,000	27.8	69.1	3.1	−41.3
Metroscopia/El País	28–29 Jul 2010	500	30.0	66.0	4.0	−36.0
Metroscopia/El País	1 Jul 2010	501	26.0	69.0	5.0	−43.0
Obradoiro de Socioloxía/Público	17 May–9 Jun 2010	?	24.2	65.3	10.5	−41.1
Metroscopia/El País	2 Jun 2010	506	19.0	76.0	5.0	−57.0
Obradoiro de Socioloxía/Público	20 Apr–19 May 2010	4,002	27.9	61.8	10.3	−33.9
Simple Lógica	5–11 May 2010	508	33.2	?	?	−?
NC Report/La Razón	26–30 Apr 2010	1,000	33.1	58.0	8.9	−24.9
Metroscopia/El País	29 Apr 2010	512	30.0	66.0	4.0	−36.0
Metroscopia/El País	8 Apr 2010	515	37.0	58.0	5.0	−21.0
NC Report/La Razón	31 Mar 2010	1,000	33.5	57.6	8.9	−24.1
Metroscopia/El País	3–4 Mar 2010	500	31.0	62.0	7.0	−31.0
Simple Lógica	1–11 Feb 2010	1,007	31.0	66.2	2.8	−35.2
NC Report/La Razón	25 Jan–6 Feb 2010	1,000	33.2	57.2	9.6	−24.0
Metroscopia/El País	3–4 Feb 2010	500	32.0	64.0	4.0	−32.0
Obradoiro de Socioloxía/Público	11–27 Jan 2010	3,206	30.8	56.5	12.7	−25.7
NC Report/La Razón	8 Jan 2010	?	33.7	56.9	9.4	−23.2
Metroscopia/El País	7 Jan 2010	504	38.0	52.0	11.0	−14.0
Metroscopia/El País	2–3 Dec 2009	732	36.0	56.0	8.0	−20.0
Obradoiro de Socioloxía/Público	9 Nov–2 Dec 2009	3,201	32.5	56.7	10.7	−24.2
NC Report/La Razón	23–26 Nov 2009	1,000	34.0	56.7	9.3	−22.7
Obradoiro de Socioloxía/Público	13 Oct–4 Nov 2009	3,204	30.9	59.4	9.7	−28.5
NC Report/La Razón	28–30 Oct 2009	1,000	35.5	55.5	9.0	−20.0
Metroscopia/El País	28–29 Oct 2009	501	38.0	56.0	6.0	−18.0
Simple Lógica	15–21 Oct 2009	1,025	35.6	59.0	5.2	−23.4
Obradoiro de Socioloxía/Público	16 Sep–7 Oct 2009	3,202	35.3	52.3	12.5	−17.0
NC Report/La Razón	28 Sep–2 Oct 2009	1,000	36.1	55.3	8.6	−19.2
Metroscopia/El País	30 Sep–1 Oct 2009	501	32.0	61.0	7.0	−29.0
Metroscopia/El País	8–9 Jul 2009	500	40.0	53.0	7.0	−13.0
NC Report/La Razón	1–3 Jul 2009	1,000	36.7	55.0	8.3	−18.3
Obradoiro de Socioloxía/Público	25 May–17 Jun 2009	3,200	37.9	47.8	14.3	−9.9
Metroscopia/El País	8–9 Jun 2009	500	43.0	49.0	8.0	−6.0
Obradoiro de Socioloxía/Público	27 Apr–20 May 2009	3,206	38.9	48.7	12.4	−9.8
NC Report/La Razón	27–30 Apr 2009	1,000	37.6	53.8	8.6	−16.2
Metroscopia/El País	27–28 Apr 2009	505	41.0	49.0	10.0	−8.0
Obradoiro de Socioloxía/Público	24 Mar–22 Apr 2009	3,204	42.9	47.1	10.0	−4.2
NC Report/La Razón	28 Mar 2009	?	38.2	53.3	8.5	−15.1
Obradoiro de Socioloxía/Público	25 Feb–18 Mar 2009	3,205	38.8	45.9	15.3	−7.1
Simple Lógica	13–23 Feb 2009	1,012	44.8	46.7	8.3	−1.9
Obradoiro de Socioloxía/Público	10–20 Jan 2009	1,600	46.1	43.9	9.9	+2.2
NC Report/La Razón	26–30 Jan 2009	1,000	46.1	47.9	6.0	−1.8
NC Report/La Razón	29 Dec–2 Jan 2009	1,000	46.6	47.2	6.2	−0.6
Noxa/La Vanguardia	15–19 Dec 2008	1,000	56.0	41.0	3.0	+15.0
Obradoiro de Socioloxía/Público	25 Nov–18 Dec 2008	3,198	43.5	42.8	13.7	+0.7
NC Report/La Razón	24–27 Nov 2008	1,000	44.8	51.7	3.5	−6.9
Obradoiro de Socioloxía/Público	27 Oct–20 Nov 2008	3,203	43.9	41.5	14.6	+2.4
NC Report/La Razón	27–30 Oct 2008	1,000	47.4	46.2	6.4	+1.2
Obradoiro de Socioloxía/Público	29 Sep–23 Oct 2008	3,203	45.0	39.5	15.5	+5.5
Simple Lógica	29 Sep–7 Oct 2008	1,006	38.9	48.9	12.2	−10.0
NC Report/La Razón	29 Sep–2 Oct 2008	1,000	47.8	45.4	6.8	+2.4
Obradoiro de Socioloxía/Público	8–25 Sep 2008	3,171	40.1	45.3	14.6	−5.2
Noxa/La Vanguardia	15–18 Sep 2008	1,000	51.0	45.0	4.0	+6.0
Opina/Cadena SER	26 Jun 2008	1,000	42.3	50.2	7.5	−7.9
Opina/Cadena SER	12 Jun 2008	1,000	44.4	48.4	7.2	−4.0

=== Mariano Rajoy ===
Polling firm/Commissioner	Fieldwork date	Sample size	Mariano Rajoy (PP)			
Polling firm/Commissioner	Fieldwork date	Sample size	check	X mark	Question	Net
Opinión 2000/Cadena SER	9–10 Nov 2011	1,000	36.0	59.4	4.6	−23.4
Simple Lógica	2–10 Nov 2011	1,009	31.3	56.1	12.6	−24.8
Ipsos/La Nueva España	1–6 Nov 2011	3,935	57.7	40.6	1.7	+17.1
Simple Lógica	3–10 Oct 2011	?	26.3	?	?	−?
Opinión 2000/Cadena SER	7–8 Sep 2011	1,000	33.9	61.7	4.4	−27.8
Simple Lógica	1–8 Sep 2011	1,022	26.8	?	?	−?
Simple Lógica	2–10 Aug 2011	1,014	26.3	?	?	−?
Metroscopia/El País	27–28 Jul 2011	1,203	23.0	69.0	8.0	−46.0
Simple Lógica	4–12 Jul 2011	?	25.3	?	?	−?
Metroscopia/El País	29–30 Jun 2011	1,001	27.0	66.0	7.0	−39.0
Opinión 2000/Cadena SER	20–21 Jun 2011	1,000	29.0	65.7	5.3	−36.7
Simple Lógica	1–6 Jun 2011	1,000	26.0	?	?	−?
Metroscopia/El País	1–2 Jun 2011	1,001	29.0	63.0	8.0	−34.0
Simple Lógica	3–13 May 2011	1,016	25.2	?	?	−?
Metroscopia/El País	27–28 Apr 2011	1,200	22.0	70.0	8.0	−48.0
Opinión 2000/Cadena SER	6–7 Apr 2011	1,000	28.4	65.8	5.8	−37.4
Metroscopia/El País	30–31 Mar 2011	1,004	25.0	68.0	7.0	−43.0
Obradoiro de Socioloxía/Público	21–24 Mar 2011	1,201	26.3	57.3	16.4	−31.0
Metroscopia/El País	2–3 Mar 2011	1,004	24.0	68.0	8.0	−44.0
Obradoiro de Socioloxía/Público	21–25 Feb 2011	1,982	26.3	59.6	14.1	−33.3
Metroscopia/El País	2–3 Feb 2011	1,005	25.0	67.0	8.0	−42.0
Opina/Cadena SER	1–2 Feb 2011	1,000	27.4	67.6	5.0	−40.2
Obradoiro de Socioloxía/Público	17–21 Jan 2011	2,082	24.2	64.1	11.7	−39.9
Opina/Cadena SER	12–13 Jan 2011	1,000	25.3	69.5	5.2	−44.2
Metroscopia/El País	3–4 Jan 2011	1,023	20.0	71.0	9.0	−51.0
Obradoiro de Socioloxía/Público	13–16 Dec 2010	1,600	22.5	63.7	13.8	−41.2
Metroscopia/El País	1–2 Dec 2010	1,000	21.0	72.0	7.0	−51.0
Obradoiro de Socioloxía/Público	2–11 Nov 2010	2,402	23.6	65.2	11.2	−41.6
Metroscopia/El País	2–4 Nov 2010	1,000	19.0	76.0	5.0	−57.0
Opina/Cadena SER	28–29 Oct 2010	1,000	27.8	68.1	4.1	−40.3
Opina/Cadena SER	7–8 Oct 2010	1,000	25.8	70.6	3.6	−44.8
NC Report/La Razón	4–7 Oct 2010	1,000	26.1	64.7	9.2	−38.6
Obradoiro de Socioloxía/Público	20 Sep–7 Oct 2010	2,329	22.8	65.0	12.2	−42.2
Metroscopia/El País	30 Sep 2010	500	23.0	72.0	5.0	−49.0
NC Report/La Razón	6–10 Sep 2010	1,000	24.7	65.7	9.6	−41.0
Metroscopia/El País	1–2 Sep 2010	500	21.0	72.0	7.0	−51.0
Opina/Cadena SER	30–31 Aug 2010	1,000	23.6	71.6	4.7	−48.0
Metroscopia/El País	28–29 Jul 2010	500	19.0	74.0	7.0	−55.0
Metroscopia/El País	1 Jul 2010	501	23.0	71.0	6.0	−48.0
Obradoiro de Socioloxía/Público	17 May–9 Jun 2010	?	22.6	64.5	12.9	−41.9
Metroscopia/El País	2 Jun 2010	506	23.0	68.0	9.0	−45.0
Obradoiro de Socioloxía/Público	20 Apr–19 May 2010	4,002	23.3	64.2	12.5	−40.9
Simple Lógica	5–11 May 2010	508	22.8	?	?	−?
NC Report/La Razón	26–30 Apr 2010	1,000	33.5	54.4	12.1	−20.9
Metroscopia/El País	29 Apr 2010	512	18.0	77.0	5.0	−59.0
Metroscopia/El País	8 Apr 2010	515	21.0	72.0	7.0	−51.0
NC Report/La Razón	31 Mar 2010	1,000	33.1	54.8	12.1	−21.7
Metroscopia/El País	3–4 Mar 2010	500	24.0	69.0	7.0	−45.0
Simple Lógica	1–11 Feb 2010	1,007	27.0	67.5	5.5	−40.5
Metroscopia/El País	3–4 Feb 2010	500	24.0	71.0	5.0	−47.0
NC Report/La Razón	25 Jan–6 Feb 2010	1,000	32.8	55.1	12.1	−22.3
Obradoiro de Socioloxía/Público	11–27 Jan 2010	3,206	21.8	62.6	15.8	−40.4
NC Report/La Razón	8 Jan 2010	?	32.6	55.1	12.3	−22.5
Metroscopia/El País	7 Jan 2010	504	20.0	68.0	12.0	−48.0
Metroscopia/El País	2–3 Dec 2009	732	21.0	70.0	9.0	−49.0
Obradoiro de Socioloxía/Público	9 Nov–2 Dec 2009	3,201	23.5	64.2	12.2	−40.7
NC Report/La Razón	23–26 Nov 2009	1,000	33.0	55.7	11.3	−22.7
Obradoiro de Socioloxía/Público	13 Oct–4 Nov 2009	3,204	21.9	65.9	12.2	−44.0
NC Report/La Razón	28–30 Oct 2009	1,000	31.2	59.2	9.6	−28.0
Metroscopia/El País	28–29 Oct 2009	501	22.0	71.0	7.0	−49.0
Simple Lógica	15–21 Oct 2009	1,025	25.1	68.4	6.4	−43.3
Obradoiro de Socioloxía/Público	16 Sep–7 Oct 2009	3,202	25.0	60.6	14.4	−35.6
NC Report/La Razón	28 Sep–2 Oct 2009	1,000	32.1	58.2	9.7	−26.1
Metroscopia/El País	30 Sep–1 Oct 2009	501	22.0	69.0	9.0	−47.0
Metroscopia/El País	8–9 Jul 2009	500	25.0	64.0	11.0	−39.0
NC Report/La Razón	1–3 Jul 2009	1,000	33.8	56.6	9.6	−22.8
Obradoiro de Socioloxía/Público	25 May–17 Jun 2009	3,200	24.9	60.6	14.4	−35.7
Metroscopia/El País	8–9 Jun 2009	500	29.0	62.0	9.0	−33.0
Obradoiro de Socioloxía/Público	27 Apr–20 May 2009	3,206	24.0	60.7	15.3	−36.7
NC Report/La Razón	27–30 Apr 2009	1,000	34.6	55.9	9.5	−21.3
Metroscopia/El País	27–28 Apr 2009	505	29.0	60.0	11.0	−31.0
Obradoiro de Socioloxía/Público	24 Mar–22 Apr 2009	3,204	29.7	57.3	12.9	−27.6
Obradoiro de Socioloxía/Público	25 Feb–18 Mar 2009	3,205	26.1	57.3	16.6	−31.2
Simple Lógica	13–23 Feb 2009	1,012	23.7	67.7	8.7	−44.0
NC Report/La Razón	26–30 Jan 2009	1,000	30.4	57.1	12.5	−26.7
Obradoiro de Socioloxía/Público	10–20 Jan 2009	1,600	39.5	55.4	5.1	−15.9
NC Report/La Razón	29 Dec–2 Jan 2009	1,000	40.1	55.1	4.8	−15.0
Noxa/La Vanguardia	15–19 Dec 2008	1,000	35.0	62.0	3.0	−27.0
Obradoiro de Socioloxía/Público	25 Nov–18 Dec 2008	3,198	26.2	58.4	15.4	−32.2
NC Report/La Razón	24–27 Nov 2008	1,000	41.1	54.2	4.7	−13.1
Obradoiro de Socioloxía/Público	27 Oct–20 Nov 2008	3,203	28.2	56.6	15.2	−28.4
NC Report/La Razón	27–30 Oct 2008	1,000	44.4	49.1	6.5	−4.7
Obradoiro de Socioloxía/Público	29 Sep–23 Oct 2008	3,203	25.2	58.6	16.2	−33.4
Simple Lógica	29 Sep–7 Oct 2008	1,006	29.8	57.4	12.8	−27.6
NC Report/La Razón	29 Sep–2 Oct 2008	1,000	42.8	50.1	7.1	−7.3
Obradoiro de Socioloxía/Público	8–25 Sep 2008	3,171	31.9	49.9	18.2	−18.0
Noxa/La Vanguardia	15–18 Sep 2008	1,000	43.0	54.0	3.0	−11.0
Opina/Cadena SER	26 Jun 2008	1,000	43.3	47.0	9.7	−3.7
Opina/Cadena SER	12 Jun 2008	1,000	31.9	59.9	8.2	−28.0

=== Gaspar Llamazares ===
Polling firm/Commissioner	Fieldwork date	Sample size	Gaspar Llamazares (IU)			
Polling firm/Commissioner	Fieldwork date	Sample size	check	X mark	Question	Net
Simple Lógica	29 Sep–7 Oct 2008	1,006	21.6	54.5	23.9	−32.9

=== Cayo Lara ===
Polling firm/Commissioner	Fieldwork date	Sample size	Cayo Lara (IU)			
Polling firm/Commissioner	Fieldwork date	Sample size	check	X mark	Question	Net
Simple Lógica	2–10 Nov 2011	1,009	17.3	53.3	29.4	−36.0
Simple Lógica	1–11 Feb 2010	1,007	16.4	39.1	44.5	−22.7
Simple Lógica	15–21 Oct 2009	1,025	11.9	41.7	46.3	−29.8
Simple Lógica	13–23 Feb 2009	1,012	10.9	34.5	54.4	−23.6
