= José Utrera Molina =

Spanish politician

Minister Secretary-General of the Movement
- In office 4 January 1974 – 5 March 1975
- Prime Minister: Carlos Arias Navarro
- Preceded by: Torcuato Fernández-Miranda
- Succeeded by: Fernando Herrero Tejedor

Minister of Housing of Spain
- In office 12 June 1973 – 4 January 1974
- Prime Minister: Luis Carrero Blanco
- Preceded by: Vicente Mortes
- Succeeded by: Luis Rodríguez de Miguel

Personal details
- Born: José Utrera Molina; 12 April 1926 Málaga, Spain
- Died: 22 April 2017 (aged 91) Nerja, Spain
- Party: FET y de las JONS

José Utrera Molina (1926–2017) was a Spanish politician who served as assistant Secretary of Labor, Minister of Housing and Minister Secretary General of the Movement.

== Career ==
Molina was born in Malaga, and completed his studies in the University of Granada. Molina served during the Spanish State of Franco as civil governor of several Spanish provinces. During the final years of the Francoist State he was in charge of important political offices.

After the death of Franco and Spain's transition to democracy, Molina was a controversial figure. He died at age 91 in 2017.

== Honours ==
- Knight Grand Cross in the Order of Charles III.
- Knight Grand Cross in the Order of Civil Merit.
- Knight Grand Cross in the Order of Alfonso X the Wise.
- Knight Grand Cross in the Imperial Order of the Yoke and Arrows.
- Knight Grand Cross in the Order of Cisneros.
- Knight Grand Cross of the Order of Agricultural Merit.
- Grand Cross of the Military Merit.
- Grand Cross of the Naval Merit.
- Grand Cross of the Aeronautical Merit.
- Nicaragua: Knight Grand Cross in the Order of the Cultural Independence Rubén Dario.
