= Ministry of Housing (Spain) =

Government ministry of Spain

Minister of Housing and Urban Agenda
- Ministerio de la Vivienda y Agenda Urbana

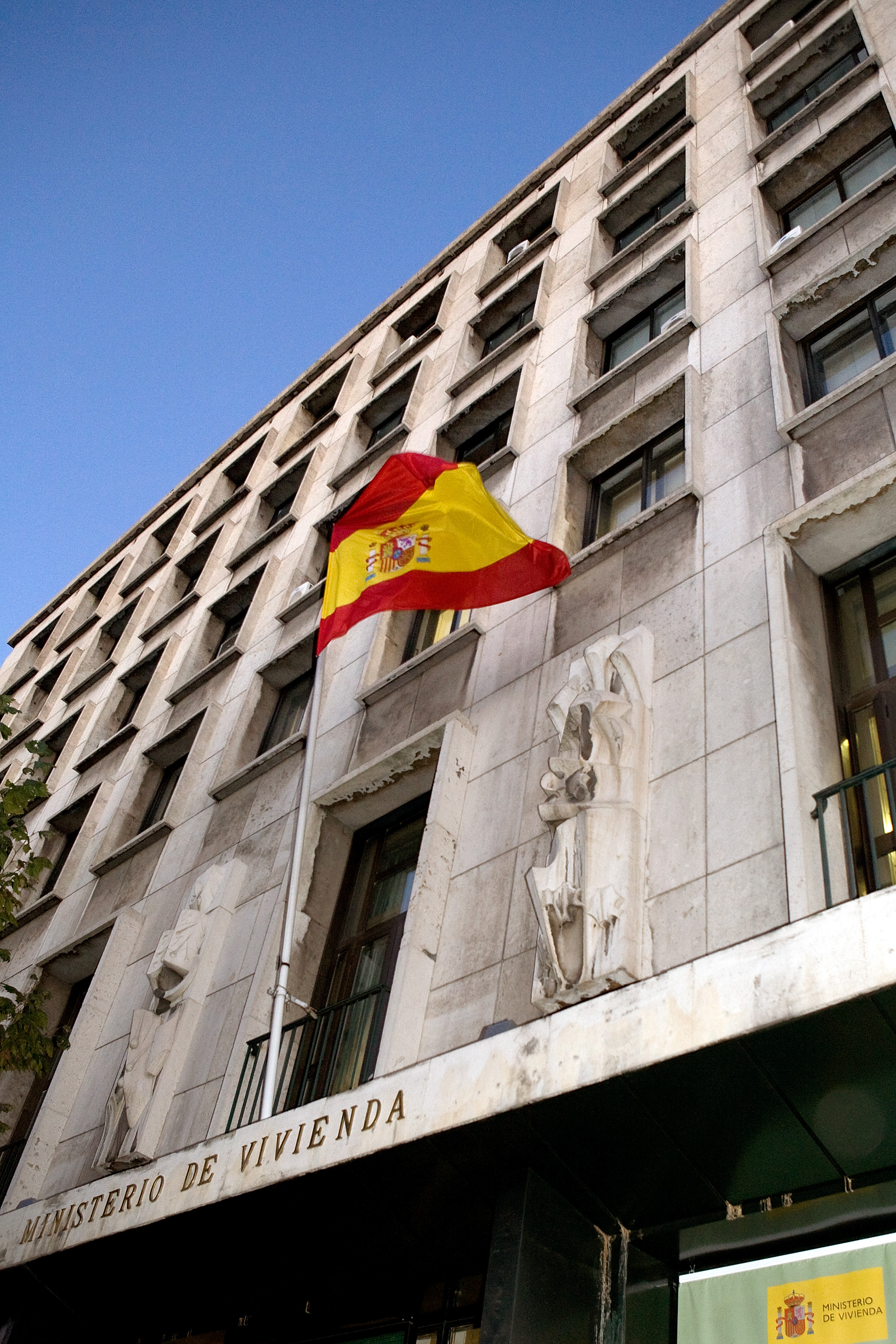
- Ministry of Housing building

Agency overview
- Formed: February 25, 1957; 69 years ago
- Preceding agency: Ministry of Development
- Type: Ministry
- Jurisdiction: Government of Spain
- Headquarters: 67, Paseo de la Castellana, Madrid, Spain
- Annual budget: € 3.5 billion, 2026
- Minister responsible: Isabel Rodríguez García, Minister
- Agency executives: David Lucas, Secretary of State; Llanos Castellanos, Under-Secretary

The Ministry of Housing and Urban Agenda (Spanish: Ministerio de la Vivienda y Agenda Urbana) is a department of the Government of Spain responsible for proposing and carrying out the government policy on right to housing, buildings, urban planning, land use and architecture.

This ministry existed in three different periods. The first one was during the dictatorship of Francisco Franco. The ministry was first established in 1957. The aim was to create a class of home owners, leaving renting and delayed owning as an exception. The second one during the democratic period, from 2004 to 2010, when Jose Luis Rodriguez Zapatero announced that the Ministry of Housing would be suppressed to reduce public spending. The third period started in late 2023, when prime minister Pedro Sánchez re-established the department.

The current Housing Minister is, since 21 November 2023, Isabel Rodríguez García, who previously served as minister of Territorial Policy and Government spokesperson between 2021 and 2023.

== Structure ==
Organizational chart of the Spanish Ministry of Housing, February 2024

The Ministry is structured as follows:

- The Secretariat of State for Housing and Urban Agenda
  - The General Secretariat for Urban Agenda, Housing and Architecture
    - The Directorate-General for Urban Agenda and Architecture
      - The Deputy Directorate-General for Urban Policies
      - The Deputy Directorate-General for Architecture and Building
    - The Directorate-General for Housing and Land
      - The Deputy Directorate-General for Housing Policy and Financial Assistance
      - The Deputy Directorate-General for Land, Information and Evaluation
    - The Directorate-General for Planning and Evaluation
      - The Deputy Directorate-General for Planning and Evaluation
- The Undersecretariat
  - The Technical General Secretariat
  - The Deputy Directorate-General for Economic and Services Coordination.
  - The Deputy Directorate-General for General Affairs and Public Procedurement.
  - The Deputy Directorate-General for Human Resources and Inspection of Services.

=== Agencies ===
- CASA 47
- The House of Architecture (national museum)

== Budget ==
In millions of euros (€)
1. Housing policy 3,439.5 (98.7%)
2. Housing regulation and urban policy 37.2 (1.07%)
3. Administration and general services 6.9 (0.20%)

For fiscal year 2023, extended to 2026, the Ministry of Housing and Urban Agenda has a consolidated budget of €3.5 billion.

The budget can be divided in three main areas:

1. Housing policy (Programs 26BA, 26BB & 261N), covering the ministry’s main housing interventions, including residential rehabilitation, construction of social housing, and financial support to facilitate access to housing.
2. Housing regulation and urban policy (261O & 261P), which funds activities related to building standards, architecture, urban planning and land policy.
3. Administration and general services (261M), covering the Ministry’s central services and administrative structure.

In addition, Programme 000X (“Internal Transfers and Disbursements”) is excluded from the analysis, as it consists of transfers between public sector entities and would otherwise lead to double counting and distort the overall budget.

=== Audit ===
The Ministry's accounts, as well as those of its agencies, are internally audited by the Office of the Comptroller General of the State (IGAE), through a Delegated Comptroller's Office within the Department itself. Externally, the Court of Auditors is responsible for auditing expenditures.

Likewise, the Congress of Deputies and the Senate Committees on Housing and Urban Agenda, exercise political control over the accounts.

== List of officeholders ==
Office name:

- Ministry of Housing (1957–1977; 2004–2010)
- Ministry of Housing and Urban Agenda (2023–present)

Portrait	Name (Birth–Death)	Term of office			Party	Government	Prime Minister (Tenure)	Ref.
Portrait	Name (Birth–Death)	Took office	Left office	Duration	Party	Government	Prime Minister (Tenure)	Ref.
	José Luis de Arrese (1905–1986)	25 February 1957	18 March 1960	3 years and 22 days	National; Movement (FET–JONS)	Franco V	Francisco Franco (1939–1975)	
	Pedro Gual Villalbí (ordinary discharge of duties) (1885–1968)	18 March 1960	21 April 1960	34 days	National; Movement (Nonpartisan)	Franco V	Francisco Franco (1939–1975)	
	José María Martínez; Sánchez-Arjona (1905–1977)	21 April 1960	11 July 1962	9 years and 192 days	National; Movement (FET–JONS)	Franco V	Francisco Franco (1939–1975)	
	José María Martínez; Sánchez-Arjona (1905–1977)	11 July 1962	8 July 1965	9 years and 192 days	National; Movement (FET–JONS)	Franco VI	Francisco Franco (1939–1975)	
	José María Martínez; Sánchez-Arjona (1905–1977)	8 July 1965	30 October 1969	9 years and 192 days	National; Movement (Nonpartisan)	Franco VII	Francisco Franco (1939–1975)	
	Vicente Mortes (1921–1991)	30 October 1969	12 June 1973	3 years and 225 days	National; Movement (Nonpartisan)	Franco VIII	Francisco Franco (1939–1975)	
	José Utrera Molina (1926–2017)	12 June 1973	31 December 1973	202 days	National; Movement (FET–JONS)	Carrero Blanco	Luis Carrero Blanco (1973)	
	Luis Rodríguez de Miguel (1910–1982)	4 January 1974	12 December 1975	1 year and 342 days	National; Movement (Nonpartisan)	Arias Navarro I	Carlos Arias Navarro (1973–1976)	
	Francisco Lozano Vicente (1922–2006)	12 December 1975	5 July 1976	1 year and 205 days	National; Movement (Nonpartisan)	Arias Navarro II	Carlos Arias Navarro (1973–1976)	
	Francisco Lozano Vicente (1922–2006)	8 July 1976	5 July 1977	1 year and 205 days	National; Movement (Nonpartisan)	Suárez I	Adolfo Suárez (1976–1981)	
Office disestablished during this interval. (Note: The department's competences were transferred to the Ministry of Public Works between 1977 and 2004.)
	María Antonia Trujillo (born 1960)	18 April 2004	9 July 2007	3 years and 82 days	PSOE	Zapatero I	José Luis; Rodríguez Zapatero (2004–2011)	
	Carme Chacón (1971–2017)	9 July 2007	14 April 2008	280 days	PSC–PSOE	Zapatero I	José Luis; Rodríguez Zapatero (2004–2011)	
	Beatriz Corredor (born 1968)	14 April 2008	21 October 2010	2 years and 190 days	PSOE	Zapatero II	José Luis; Rodríguez Zapatero (2004–2011)	
Office disestablished during this interval. (Note: The department's competences were transferred to the Ministry of Development between 2010 and 2023.)
	Isabel Rodríguez (born 1981)	21 November 2023	Incumbent	2 years, 260 days	PSOE	Sánchez III	Pedro Sánchez (2018–present)	
