= The House of Architecture =

Architecture and Urbanism museum in Madrid, Spain

Coordinates: 40°26′37″N 3°41′32″W

- La Casa de la Arquitectura
- Former name: Museo Nacional de Arquitectura y Urbanismo
- Established: 29 December 2006
- Location: Madrid, Spain
- Type: Architecture museum
- Public transit access: Nuevos Ministerios
- Website: Official site

The House of Architecture, officially known as La Casa de la Arquitectura, is a museum in Madrid, Spain, devoted to promote, improve knowledge, value, and disseminate architecture, urban planning, and landscaping, with special attention to Spanish works and architects. The museum is located in the Nuevos Ministerios complex. It is one of the National Museums of Spain and it is attached to the Ministry of Housing.

== History ==
The museum was established on 29 December 2006 as Museo Nacional de Arquitectura y Urbanismo. The original idea was designed to have two seats: one in Salamanca dedicated to architecture, and another in Barcelona dedicated to urban planning; in addition to a Documentation Center.

On 14 June 2022, the Cortes Generales approved the Law on Quality of Architecture, the seventh article of which included the constitution of the "Casa de la Arquitectura", a new name for the museum with the aim of relaunching the project after almost a decade without progress.

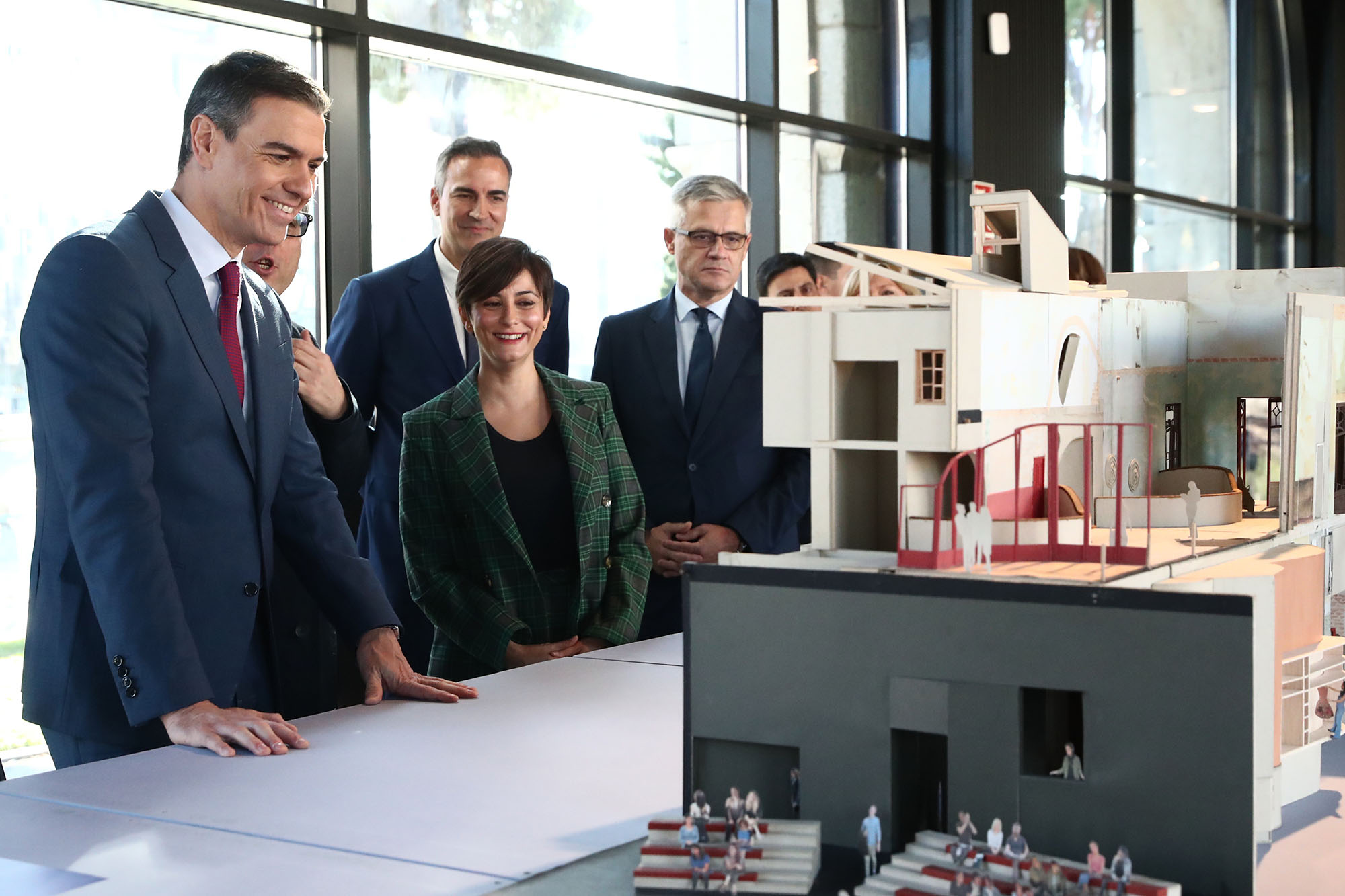
Inauguration on 18 December 2023, Prime Minister Sánchez (left), Minister of Housing Rodríguez (center)

On 18 December 2023, in an event chaired by Prime Minister Pedro Sánchez, The House of Architecture was inaugurated as a new National Museum in the arcade of Nuevos Ministerios in Madrid. The following day, the Council of Ministers approved the museum's statutes, confirming its headquarters as permanent with the possibility of secondary sites in other Spanish cities.

== Organization ==
The House of Architecture is attached to the Ministry of Housing and is governed by a Board of Trustees, chaired by the director of the museum and made up of representatives of the Ministries of Housing and Culture, as well as representatives of the official associations of architects.

== The museum ==
The House of Architecture is located in Paseo de la Castellana, in the arcade of Nuevos Ministerios. It is dedicated to promoting, improving knowledge, valuing, and disseminating architecture, urban planning, and landscaping, with special attention to Spanish works and architects. The museum, in addition to the physical space for its permanent collection and the temporary exhibitions, maintains an online virtual museum on its website.
