= Francisco Caamaño Domínguez =

Spanish politician (born 1963)

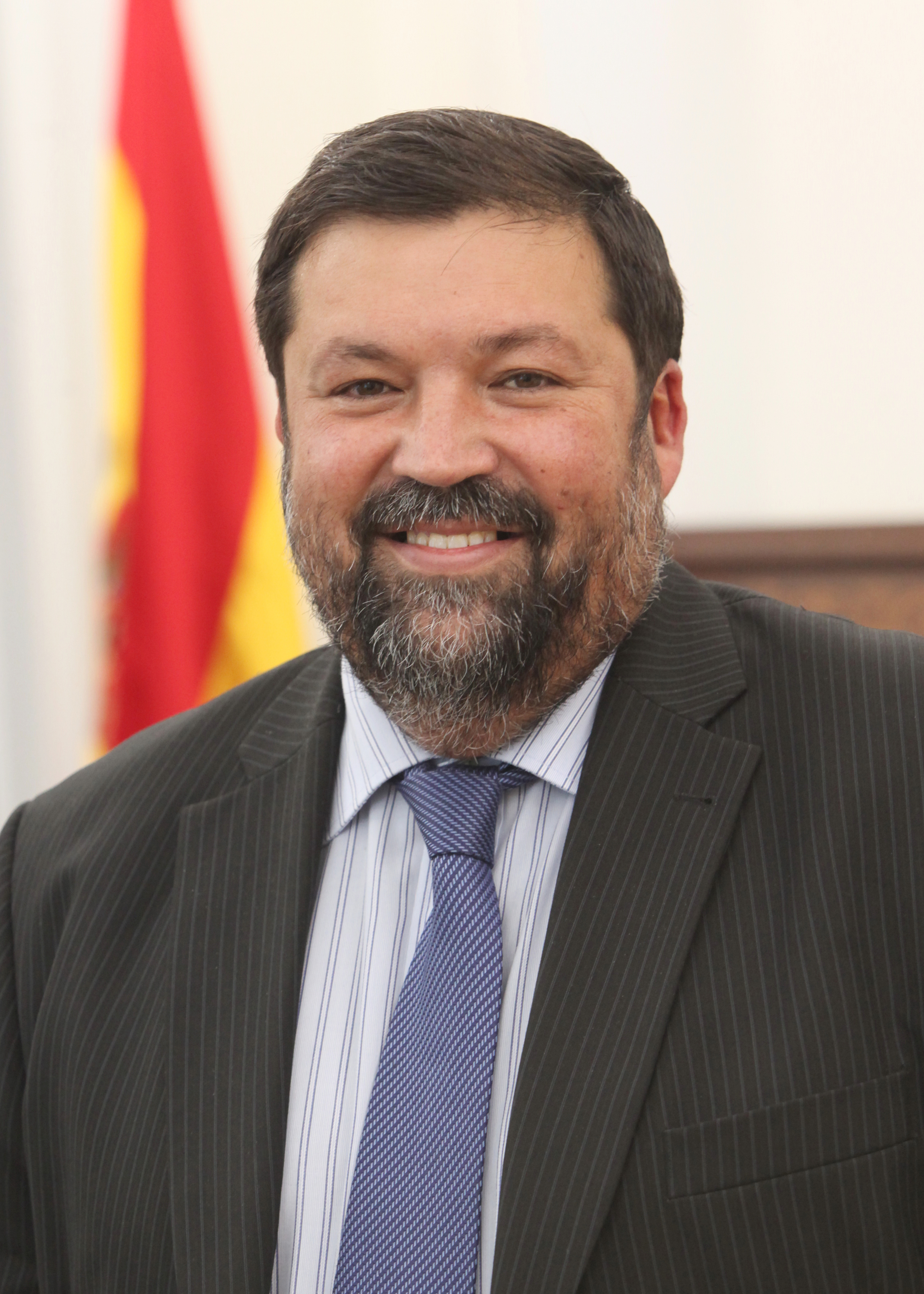

Minister of Justice
- In office 24 February 2009 – 22 December 2011
- Prime Minister: Jose Luis Rodriguez Zapatero
- Preceded by: Mariano Fernández Bermejo
- Succeeded by: Alberto Ruiz Gallardón

Personal details
- Born: 8 January 1963 (age 63) Ceé, A Coruña Province
- Party: Spanish Socialist Workers' Party
- Education: University of Santiago de Compostela

Francisco Caamaño Domínguez (born 8 January 1963) is a Spanish politician, who served as justice minister from 2009 to 2011. He is a member of the Spanish Parliament.

== Early life and education ==
Caamaño was born in Ceé, A Coruña province, on 8 January 1963. He holds a law degree and a PhD in law, both of which he received from the University of Santiago de Compostela.

== Career ==
Caamaño started his career as a university professor at his alma mater, the University of Santiago de Compostela. In 1993, he became the barrister of the constitutional court and in October 2002 the chairman of constitutional law at the University of Valencia. He also served as the director of the Fundación Democracia y Gobierno Local and co-director of the Local Law Journal.

He is a member of the Spanish Socialist Workers' Party. In April 2004, he was named as the Secretary of State for Relations with the Cortes. From April 2008 to February 2009 he served as the Secretary of State for Constitutional and Parliamentary Affairs.

He was appointed justice minister to the cabinet led by José Luis Rodríguez Zapatero on 24 February 2009. Caamaño succeeded Mariano Fernández Bermejo, who resigned from office. Alberto Ruiz Gallardón succeeded Caamaño in the post on 22 December 2011. Caamaño has been a deputy of A Coruña Province for the socialist party at the Spanish Parliament since 2011.

== Personal life ==
Caamaño is married and has two daughters.
