= Luis Rodríguez de Miguel =

Spanish jurist and politician (1921–2009)

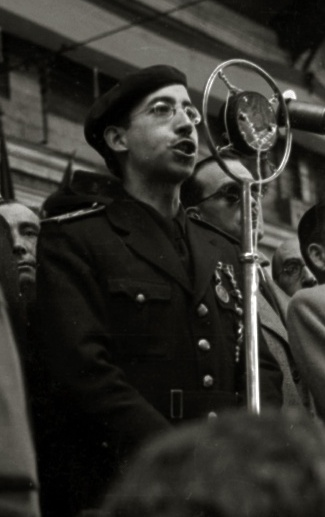
- De Miguel delivering speech during his service in the Blue Division

Minister of Housing
- In office 3 January 1974 – 12 December 1975
- Prime Minister: Carlos Arias Navarro
- Preceded by: José Utrera Molina

Personal details
- Born: 3 July 1910 Zamora
- Died: 19 April 1982 (aged 71) Zamora
- Party: FET y de las JONS
- Spouse: María Luisa Ramos
- Children: 8

Luis Rodríguez de Miguel (1910–1982) was a Spanish politician and jurist. He was a specialist in criminal psychology. He was a member of the Falange Party during the Franco era and served as the minister of housing between 1974 and 1975.

== Early life and education ==
Rodríguez was born on 3 July 1910 in Zamora. His father was civil governor of the province of Girona and first-class commissioner of the surveillance corps. Luis Rodríguez studied law in Barcelona and Madrid and obtained a diploma in criminal psychology from the University of Madrid in 1933.

== Career ==
Following his graduation Rodríguez started his prosecutor career in 1935 Zamora and Salamanca. When the Civil War broke out in 1936 he sided with the rebels and joined the Falange Party. Following the war, he was appointed civil governor of the Balearic Islands in 1941 and later of Guipúzcoa in 1942. The same year he joined the Blue Division, a military body that General Franco allocated to Germany in World War II, in San Sebastián. In 1944 Rodríguez was appointed director general of the Post Office and served in the post until 1956. He was named the president of the board of directors of the International Telecommunication Union, based in Geneva, in 1954 and was also court attorney for the Trade Union Organization in 1955.

In 1957 he was appointed undersecretary of the Ministry of the Interior under the General Camilo Alonso Vega. Rodríguez held the post until 1969. In 1974, he was appointed minister of housing to the cabinet led by Prime Minister Carlos Arias Navarro, replacing José Utrera Molina in the post. He was in office from 3 January 1974 to 12 December 1975. In February 1980 he was appointed attorney general of the Supreme Court, which he held until his death in February 1982.

== Personal life and death ==
Rodríguez married María Luisa Ramos, and they had eight children. He died in his hometown, Zamaro, on 19 April 1982 and was buried there.

== Legacy and awards ==
A street in the town of Toro was named after him.

Rodríguez was the recipient of the following: Grand Cross of the Order of Civil Merit (1947); Grand Cross of the Imperial Order of the Yoke and Arrows (1959); Grand Cross of the Order of Saint Raymond of Peñafort (1961); Grand Cross of the Order of Cisneros (1964); Gold Medal for Tourism Merit (1964); Grand Cross of the Order of Isabella the Catholic (1969); Grand Plaque of the Order of Postal Merit (1969) and Grand Cross of the Order of Charles III (1975).
