= Vicente Mortes =

Spanish politician

Minister of Housing of Spain
- In office 30 October 1969 – 9 June 1973
- Prime Minister: Francisco Franco
- Preceded by: José María Martínez Sánchez-Arjona
- Succeeded by: José Utrera Molina

Personal details
- Born: Vicente Mortes Alfonso; 8 November 1921 Paterna, Kingdom of Spain
- Died: 21 May 1991 (aged 69) Pamplona, Navarre, Spain
- Party: FET y de las JONS; Opus Dei (National Movement)

Vicente Mortes Alfonso (8 November 1921 – 21 May 1991) was a Spanish politician who served as Minister of Housing of Spain between 1969 and 1973, during the Francoist dictatorship. He was a member of FET y de las JONS and the Opus Dei.

== Bibliography ==
- González Ordovás, María José (2000). Políticas y estrategias urbanas: la distribución del espacio privado y público en la ciudad (in Spanish). Editorial Fundamentos. ISBN 9788424508364.
