= Mariano Fernández Bermejo =

Spanish jurist, politician and former minister of justice (born 1948)

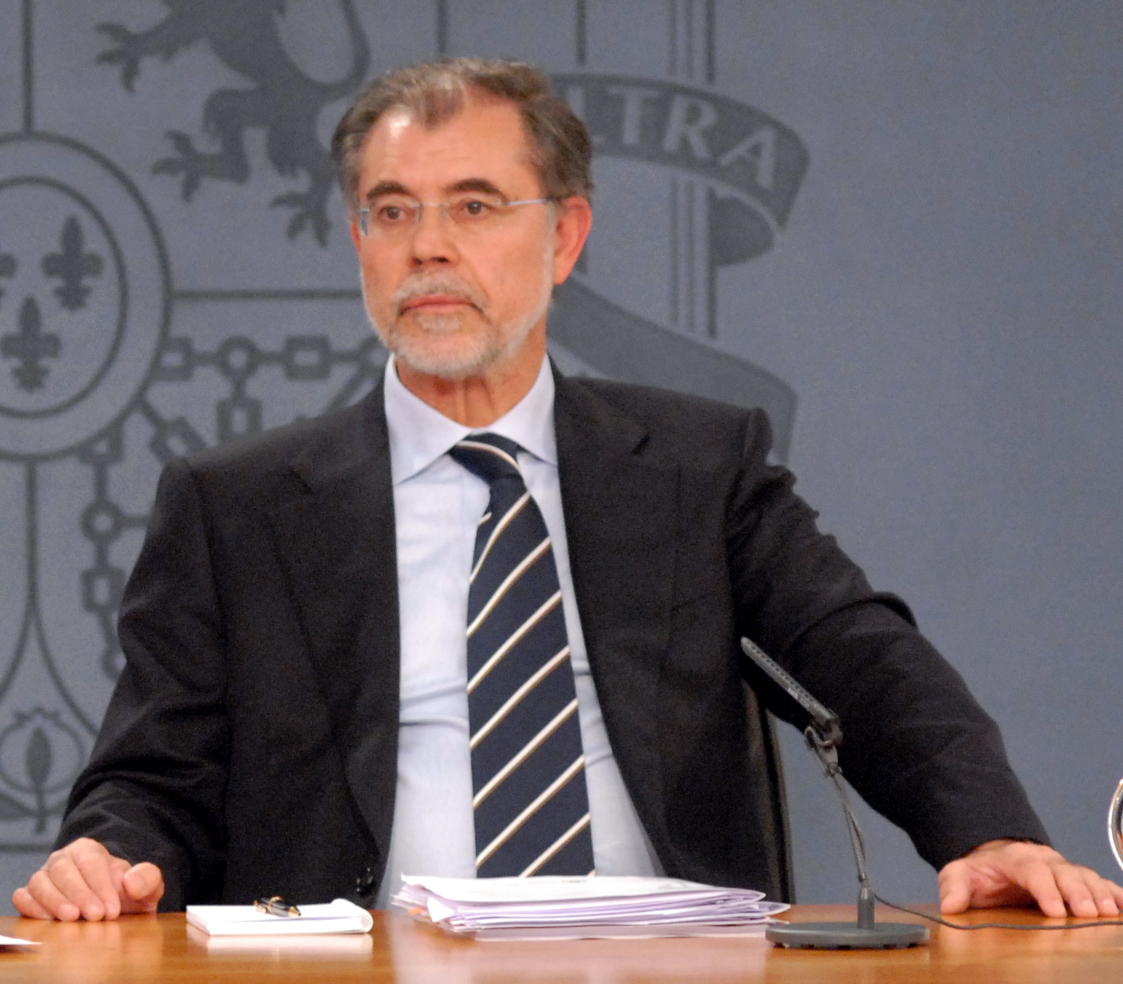

Minister of Justice
- In office 12 February 2007 – 24 February 2009
- Prime Minister: Jose Luis Rodriguez Zapatero
- Preceded by: Juan Fernando Lopez Aguilar
- Succeeded by: Francisco Caamaño Domínguez

Personal details
- Born: 1948 (age 77–78) Arenas de San Pedro, Ávila
- Party: Independent
- Education: Complutense University

Mariano Fernández Bermejo (born 1948) is a Spanish jurist and politician, who served as justice minister of Spain from 2007 to 2009.

== Early life and education ==
Bermejo was born in Arenas de San Pedro, Ávila, in 1948. He holds a PhD in law, which he obtained from Complutense University in Madrid in November 1969. He also received an advanced degree in community law in 1998.

== Career ==
Bermejo started his career as a lecturer and until 1974 he worked at the University of Extremadura and at the UNED. In 1974, he began to work as an attorney. He served as a public prosecutor at the provincial courts of Santa Cruz de Tenerife and Cáceres. He also served as a deputy prosecutor and director of public prosecution in Segovia. In September 1986, he became the executive advisor to the minister of justice and served in the post until 1989. Bermejo was appointed prosecutor at the supreme court of justice in June 1989. He served as the chief public prosecutor in Madrid from 1992 to 2003. He was dismissed by the People's Party in 2003 due to the tensions between him and party officials. In July 2004, he became director of public prosecution in the department for suits in Madrid. He is a founding member of the Progressive Union of Public Prosecutors.

He was appointed justice minister to the cabinet led by Prime Minister Jose Luis Rodriguez Zapatero in a reshuffle on 12 February 2007, replacing Juan Fernando Lopez Aguilar in the post. Bermejo retained his post in a May 2008 reshuffle. He resigned from office on 24 February 2009 due to his alleged intervention to a corruption investigation about a member of the People's Party. Bermejo was replaced by Francisco Caamaño Domínguez in the post.

Bermejo was also elected to the Spanish parliament for Murcia province in the 2008 election.
