= Jordi Sevilla =

Spanish politician

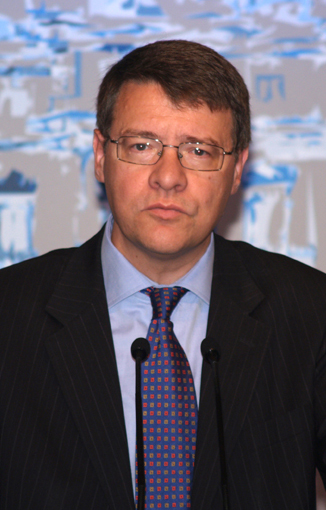
Jordi Sevilla

Jordi Sevilla Segura (Valencia, Spain 19 March 1956), is a Spanish politician and economist chairman of Red Eléctrica Group between 2018 and 2020, when he resigned. He was Minister for Public Administration between 2004 and 2007.

Married with three children, he holds a BA in Economics from the University of Valencia and belongs to the State Body of Senior Trade Advisors and Economists of the State.

== Political career ==
Between 1985 and 1991 he served as an advisor on International Economic Relations to the cabinet of the Prime Minister of Spain. From 1991 to 1993 he was head of the Cabinet of the then Minister of Agriculture, Pedro Solbes, whom he accompanied from 1993 to 1996 as Director of the Office of the Minister of Economy and Finance. Between 1998 and 2000 he was an adviser to the Parliamentary Socialist Group in Congress.

He was elected to the Spanish Congress in 2000 representing Castellon Province and was re-elected in 2004 and 2008. He also served as Secretary of Economic Policy and served on the Spanish Socialist Workers' Party's Federal Executive Committee (FEC).

On 18 April 2004, with the PSOE victory in the General Election, he was appointed Minister of Public Administration, serving until 6 July 2007 when he was replaced by the then Health Minister Elena Salgado.

In September 2008, he resigned to his seat in the Congress of Deputies to join PricewaterhouseCoopers.

He has written several articles and three books:

- Review and prospects of North-South (1993)
- The Spanish economy to the single currency (1997)
- Againsocialism (2002)
