= Elena Espinosa =

Spanish politician (born 1960)

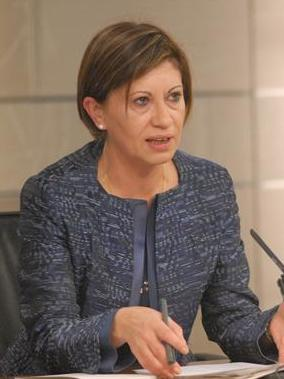
Elena Espinosa (2010)

Elena Espinosa (born 21 March 1960 in Ourense) is a Spanish politician in the Spanish Socialist Workers' Party. She was the Spanish Minister of the Environment until 20 October 2010 when she was replaced by Rosa Aguilar. She currently represents Ourense in the Spanish Congress.

She was previously Minister of Agriculture and Fishing before this ministry was merged with the Ministry of the Environment, and was a strong proponent for the introduction of genetically modified food in Spain.

On 4 March 2012, she presented her candidacy to the General Secretariat of the Galician Socialist Party (PSdeG-PSOE) at the 12th Congress held between 9 and 11 March, but was unable to overcome her rival Pachi Vázquez. Shortly afterwards, she left politics and joined her former company as assistant to the President of the Rodman Group.

== Honours ==
=== National honours ===
- Dame Grand Cross of the Order of Charles III (05/11/2010).
