= César Antonio Molina =

Spanish writer, cultural manager and politician (born 1952)

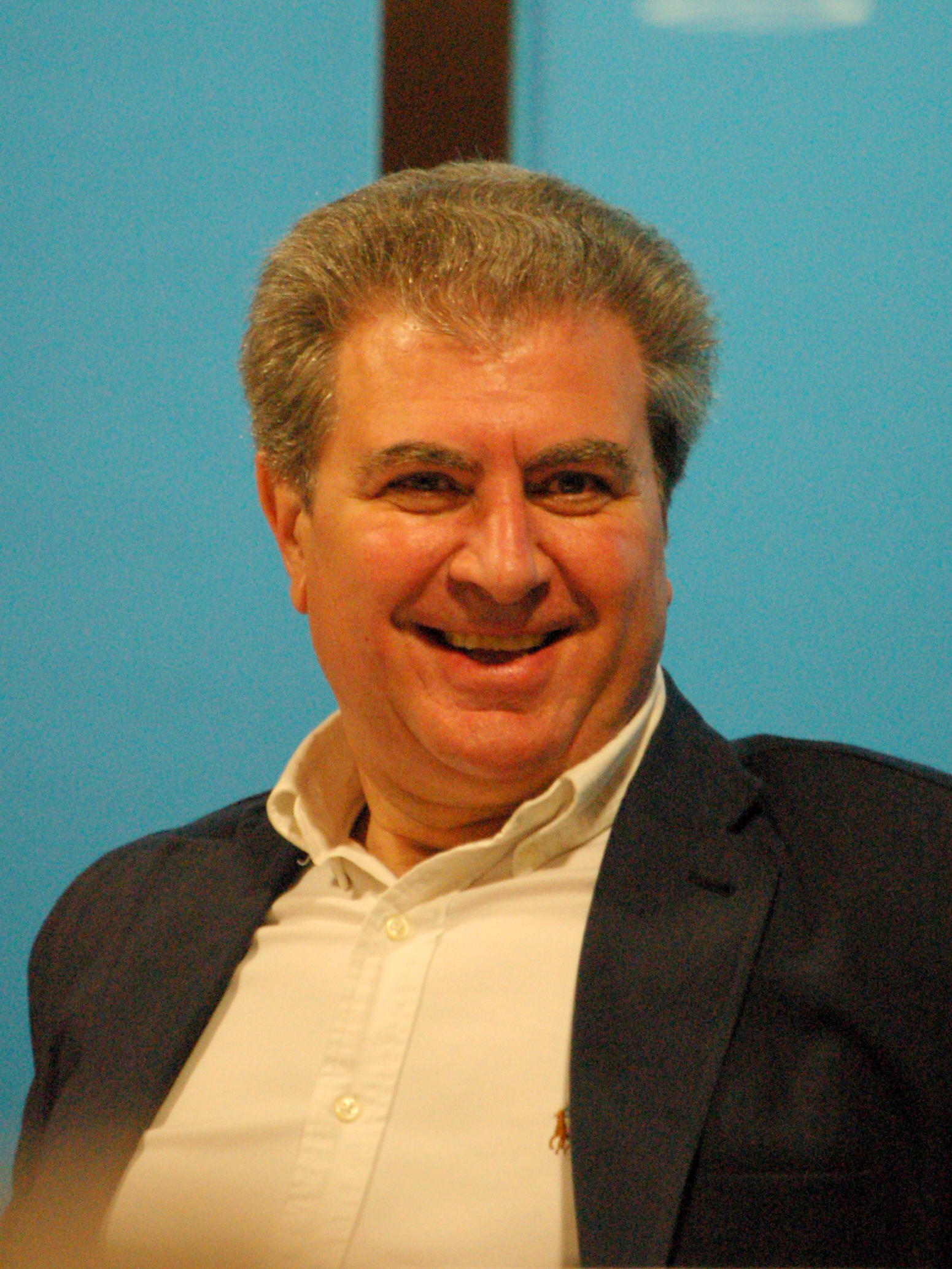

Minister of Culture
- In office 9 July 2007 – 7 April 2009
- Prime Minister: José Luis Rodríguez Zapatero
- Preceded by: Carmen Calvo
- Succeeded by: Ángeles González-Sinde

Personal details
- Born: César Antonio Molina Sánchez; 14 September 1952 (age 74) La Coruña, Spain
- Party: Independent
- Education: University of Santiago de Compostela

César Antonio Molina Sánchez (born 14 September 1952) is a Spanish writer, translator, university professor, cultural manager and politician. He served as Minister of Culture of Spain from July 2007 until April 2009.
