= María Antonia Trujillo =

Spanish politician

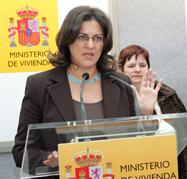
María Antonia Trujillo

María Antonia Trujillo Rincón (born 18 December 1960) is a Spanish Socialist Workers' Party (PSOE) politician.

== Early life and education ==
Trujillo was born in Peraleda del Zaucejo, Badajoz. She earned a bachelor's and doctor's degree in law from the University of Extremadura, where she has worked as a professor of Constitutional Law.

== Career ==
After being counsellor in Juan Carlos Rodríguez Ibarra's cabinet (Junta de Extremadura) from 1999 to 2004, Trujillo was the Minister of Housing during the first part of José Luis Rodríguez Zapatero's legislature (2004–2007).

In 2019, Trujillo moved to Morocco to head the Spanish Ministry of Education in Rabat. She was removed from this position in May 2022.

== Ceuta and Melilla controversy ==
In September 2022, she was declared “persona non grata” by authorities of the Spanish enclaves of Melilla and Ceuta, barring her from entering the cities, after she supported Morocco's historical claims to the two enclaves, stating that Ceuta and Melilla are "vestiges of the past that interfere in the economic and political independence of this country and in the good relations between the two countries".

== Personal life ==
Trujillo is divorced and has a child. From 2015 to December 2020, she was romantically involved with a Moroccan man.

Political offices
Preceded by New Office	Minister of Housing of Spain; 2004–2007	Succeeded by Carme Chacón
Spanish Congress of Deputies
Preceded by Title jointly held	Deputy for Cáceres province 2008–present	Succeeded by Title jointly held
