= Carme Chacón =

Spanish politician

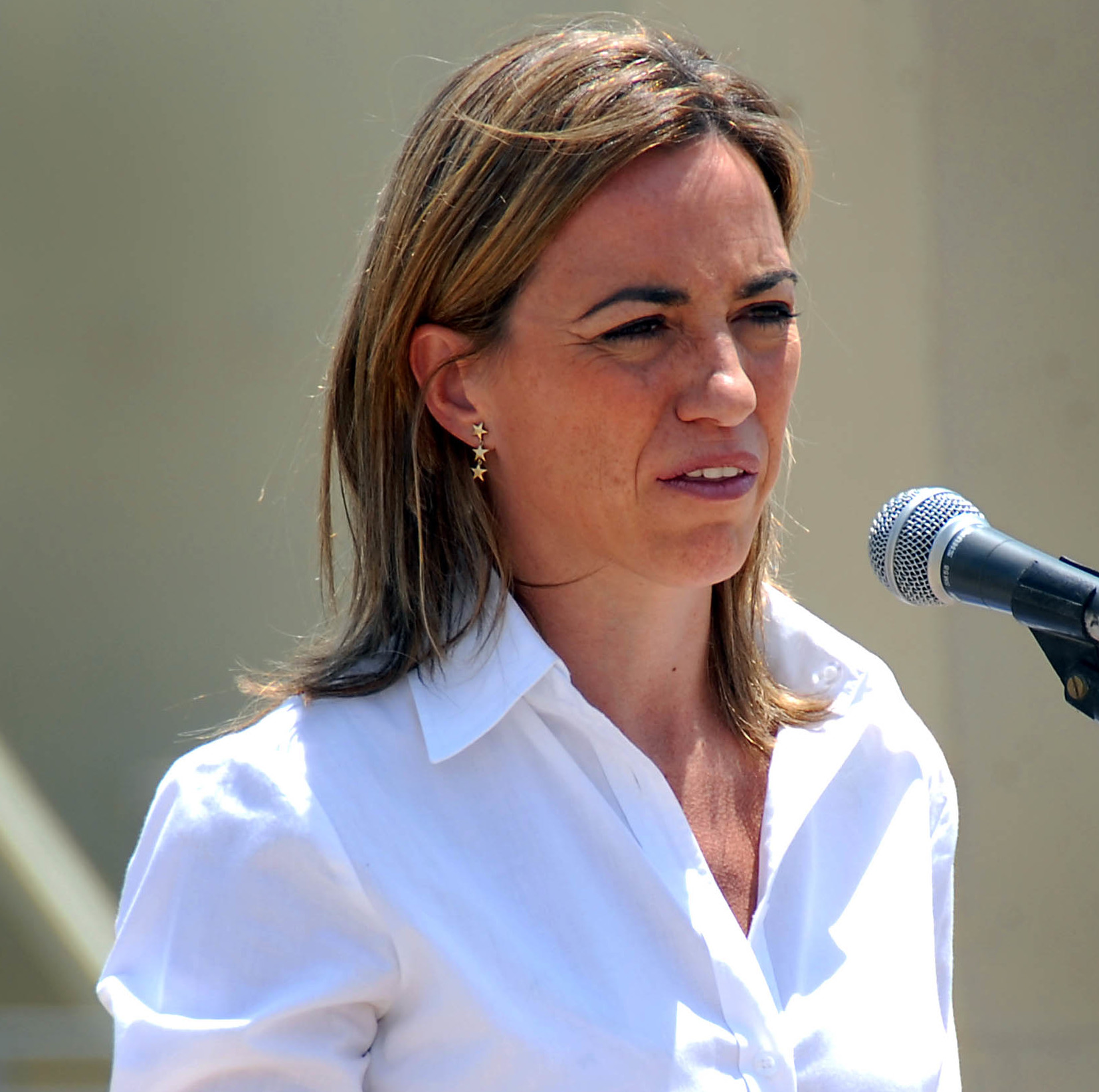

Minister of Defence
- In office April 14, 2008 – May 20, 2008
- Prime Minister: José Luis Rodríguez Zapatero
- Preceded by: José Antonio Alonso
- Succeeded by: Alfredo Pérez Rubalcaba (interim)
- In office June 30, 2008 – December 22, 2011
- Prime Minister: José Luis Rodríguez Zapatero
- Preceded by: Alfredo Pérez Rubalcaba (interim)
- Succeeded by: Pedro Morenés

Minister of Housing
- In office July 9, 2007 – April 11, 2008
- Prime Minister: José Luis Rodríguez Zapatero
- Preceded by: María Antonia Trujillo
- Succeeded by: Beatriz Corredor

Member of the Congress of Deputies
- In office January 13, 2016 – July 19, 2016
- Constituency: Barcelona
- In office March 13, 2000 – August 31, 2013
- Constituency: Barcelona

Personal details
- Born: Carme Chacón Piqueras; March 13, 1971 Esplugues de Llobregat, Spain
- Died: April 9, 2017 (aged 46) Madrid, Spain
- Party: PSOE (PSC)
- Spouse: Miguel Barroso (2007–2016)
- Education: University of Barcelona; University of Kingston; York University; Laval University
- Occupation: Lawyer; Professor

Carme Maria Chacón Piqueras (Catalan pronunciation: [ˈkaɾmə tʃəˈkom piˈkeɾəs]; March 13, 1971 – April 9, 2017) was a Spanish lawyer, lecturer and politician who was minister of Defence from 2008 to 2011 in the cabinet led by Spanish Prime Minister José Luis Rodríguez Zapatero.

A member of the Spanish Socialist Workers Party (PSOE) from 1994, she was elected member of the Parliament of Catalonia and vice president of the Spanish Congress of Deputies, the lower house in the Spanish Parliament. In 2007, she entered the cabinet led by Spanish Prime Minister José Luís Rodríguez Zapatero as minister of Housing. A year later, she became the first woman to take charge of the Spanish Ministry of Defense.

== Early life and education ==
Chacón was born in Esplugues de Llobregat in Catalonia, in the region of Baix Llobregat. She held a bachelor's degree in law from the University of Barcelona, and conducted her postgraduate studies at Osgoode Hall Law School, Kingston University and Laval University. Besides this, she worked as a lecturer of constitutional law at the University of Girona between 1994 and 2004.

== Political career ==
Chacón was a member of the Socialists' Party of Catalonia (PSC) and Spanish Socialist Workers' Party (PSOE) since 1994. She was first elected as a PSOE member of parliament for Barcelona in the 2000 election. In the same year, she became vice-president of the Spanish Congress of Deputies (Lower House) in José Luis Rodríguez Zapatero's legislature and she was later named minister of Housing after María Antonia Trujillo, before becoming minister of Defence in April 2008.

=== Member of Parliament ===
Her parliamentary career started after the general elections of 2000 when she won a seat for the province of Barcelona and went on to be re-elected as such.

=== Minister of Housing ===
Whilst José Luis Rodríguez Zapatero's term, Carme replaced María Antonia Trujillo as minister of Housing. When already in charge, she had to face the Spanish real estate bubble.

=== Minister of Defence ===
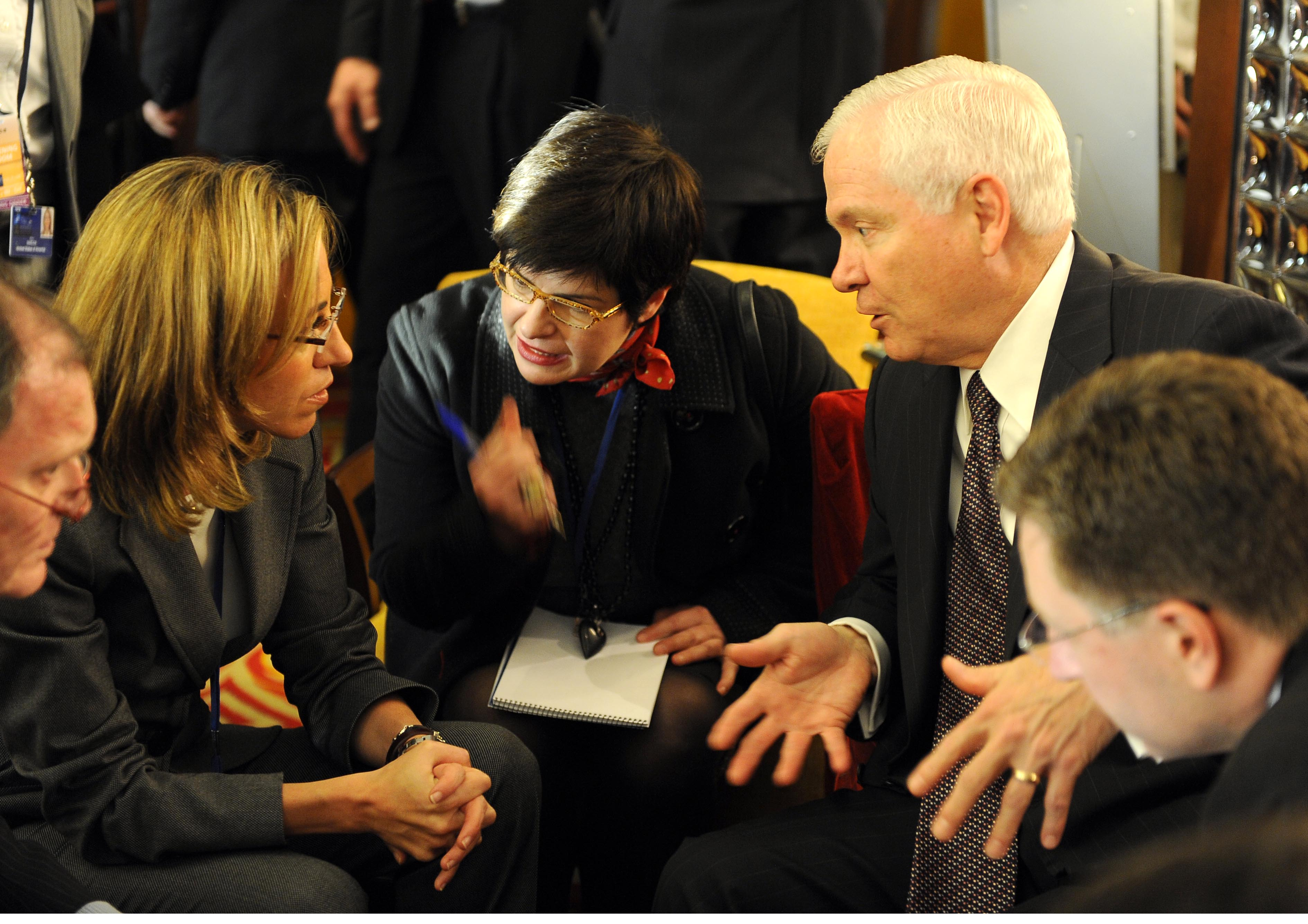
Spanish Minister of Defense Carme Chacón and Secretary of Defense Robert M. Gates discuss defense issues during the Budapest NATO Conference in Budapest (Hungary, on October 9, 2008).

April 14, 2008, Chacón was named minister of Defence. She became the first female minister of Defence in Spain, which, together with the fact that she was seven months pregnant at the time, was considered a significant development by the press. Interior Minister Alfredo Pérez Rubalcaba temporarily took over the defense portfolio when Chacón gave birth. Shortly after she chose to live in the Ministry's residence, which has its own kindergarten, so as not to waste time travelling between her home and her workplace. That year surveys results points to her as the most influential minister of Mr Zapatero's cabinet.

In 2009, Carme announced the controversial withdrawal of Spanish troops set in Kosovo due to its unrecognizable independence proclamation for the country. Despite the strong opposition of the US government, the Spanish cabinet agreed with the NATO allies the gradual withdrawal of these troops.

In the same year, with the growth of piracy in Somali waters, Carme had to deal with the capture of Alakrana, a Basque trawler. A year after, she justified the delivery of new troops to Afghanistan as she proclaimed there was light at the end of the tunnel. Months later, she travelled to Haiti to decorate dead Spanish soldiers on a helicopter crash and visit those deployed due to an earthquake.

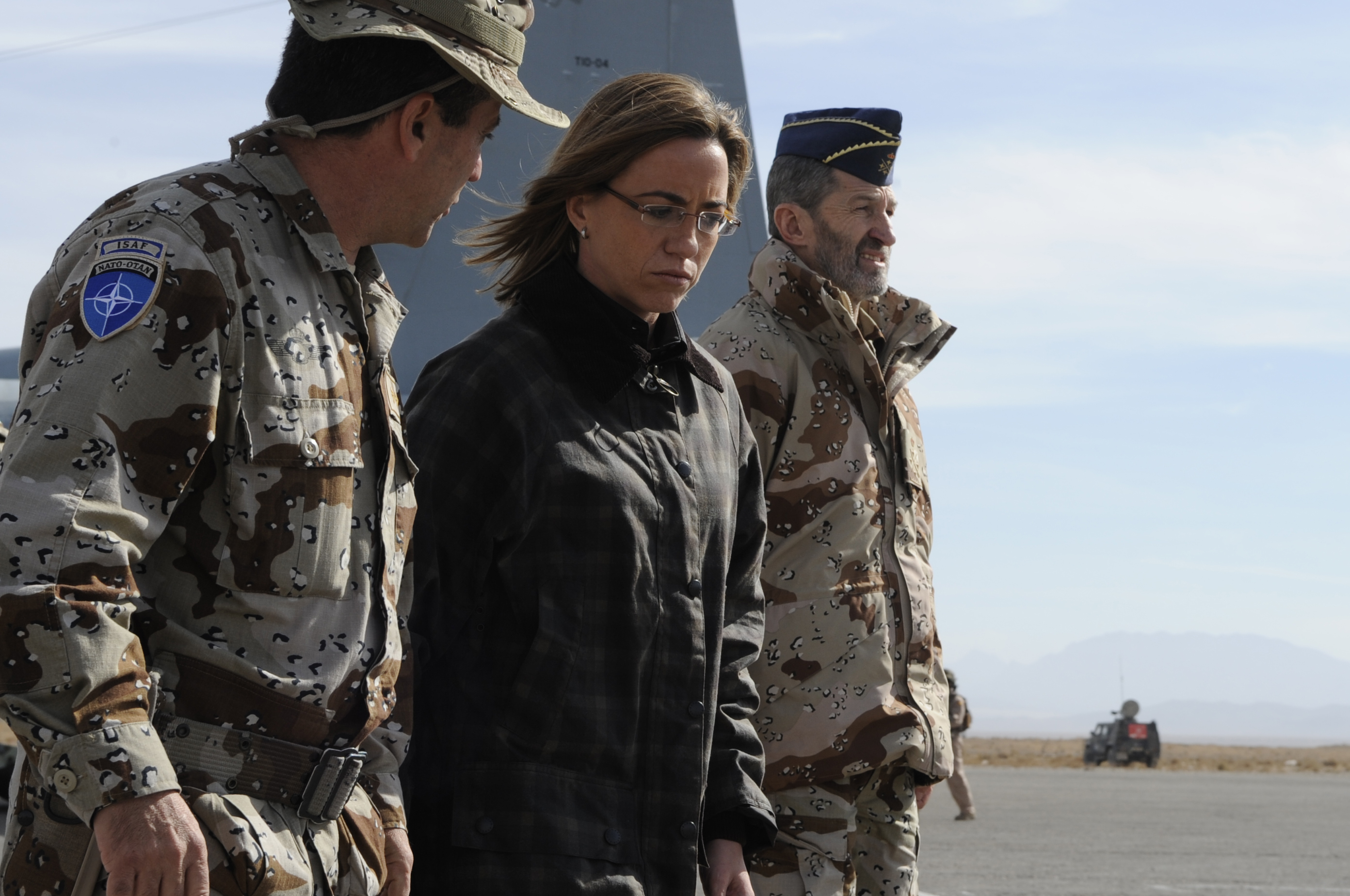
Chacón in Herat, Afghanistan in 2010

At the NATO summit in Lisbon in 2010, she informed that the Spanish Armed Forces would start the transference of two Afghan provinces under their control in 2011, three years before the established date by the Alliance for the retreat of the troops. As a minister, the country's Emergency State of the democracy was decreed for the air traffic controllers' crisis in 2010. She also chaired the meetings of the EU defence ministers while Spain held the European Union's six-month rotating presidency. During this time, she led the negotiations with EADS about €3.5 billion ($4.7 billion) extra funding for the Airbus A400M Atlas military transport.

In 2011, the Congreso de los Diputados, the lower house in the Spanish Parliament, adopted a law for the rights and duties of the soldiers (also known as Chacon law). This law allows the soldiers to have an associative activity and creates a committee or Junta de Personal acting as a link between the Ministry and the troops.

=== 38th Federal Congress of PSOE ===
After Zapatero announced he was not going to run in the 2012 elections, Chacón was expected to run for her party's leadership during autumn 2011. However, after the failure of the PSOE in 2011 local elections, she announced that she was withdrawing from the race. The general election was held early in November 2011, in which Zapatero's government was defeated by the People's Party. She left her post and was replaced by new defence minister, Pedro Morenés.

In January 2012 she announced her intention to opt for the general secretary of PSOE. According to Chacón, her goal was to "lead a new project" and "raise" the party. However, during the celebration of the 38th Federal Congress of PSOE, Chacón lost against Alfredo Pérez Rubalcaba 487 to 465 votes.

=== PSOE's Secretary for International Relations ===
Since PSOE's Extraordinary Congress, celebrated in July 2014, Chacón handled the Socialist party's international relations. When Rubalcaba later announced his resignation after his party's dismal showing in the 2014 European elections, Chacón was widely seen as one of the frontrunners for his replacement, but did not run. She left politics in 2016 to practice law. She was also a member of the European Council on Foreign Relations.

== Personal life ==
From 2007 to 2016 she was married to Miguel Barroso Ayats, a Spanish journalist, father of her son, also named Miguel.

Chacón was found dead at her home on April 9, 2017, aged 46, due to a congenital heart defect. Chacón suffered from dextrocardia and an atrioventricular block.

== See also ==
- Université Laval

Political offices
Preceded by Margarita Mariscal de Gante	Vice-President of the Congress of Deputies; 2004–2007	Succeeded by Carmen Calvo
Preceded by María Antonia Trujillo	Minister of Housing; 2007–2008	Succeeded by Beatriz Corredor
Preceded by José Antonio Alonso	Minister of Defence; 2008–2011	Succeeded by Pedro Morenés
