= 8th Congress of Deputies =

This is a list of members of Spain's eighth Congress of Deputies.

- Mª Rosario Fátima Aburto Baselga (GS)
- Ángel Jesús Acebes Paniagua (GP)
- José Acosta Cubero (GS)
- Juan Manuel Albendea Pabón (GP)
- Carmen Alborch Bataller (GS)
- María Angustias Alcázar Escribano (GS)
- Joaquín Almunia Amann (GS)
- Alejandro Alonso Núñez (GS)
- José Antonio Alonso (GS)
- Amador Álvarez Álvarez (GP)
- Magdalena Álvarez Arza (GS)
- Eloísa Álvarez Oteo (GS)
- Emilio Amuedo Moral (GS)
- Josep Andreu Domingo (GER-ERC)
- Francesc Antich Oliver (GS)
- Carlos Aragonés Mendiguchía (GP)
- Elviro Aranda Álvarez (GS)
- Francisco Javier Arenas Bocanegra (GP)
- Miguel Arias Cañete (GP)
- Gustavo Manuel de Arístegui y San Román (GP)
- Erasmo Juan Manuel Armas Dárias (GS)
- Mª Antonia de Armengol Criado (GS)
- Mª del Mar Arnaiz García (GS)
- Alfredo Francisco Javier Arola Blanquet (GS)
- Elías Arribas Aragonés (GP)
- Marisa Arrúe Bergareche (GP)
- Ignacio Astarloa Huarte-Mendicoa (GP)
- Manuel Atencia Robledo (GP)
- Andrés José Ayala Sánchez (GP)
- José Luis Ayllón Manso (GP)
- Pedro María Azpiazu Uriarte (GV (EAJ-PNV))
- José Eugenio Azpiroz Villar (GP)
- Alejandro Francisco Ballestero de Diego (GP)
- María Fátima Báñez García (GP)
- Rogelio Baón (GP)
- Ismael Bardisa Jordá (GP)
- Uxue Barkos Berruezo (GMx)
- Miguel Barrachina Ros (GP)
- Jaime Javier Barrero López (GS)
- Juan Antonio Barrio de Penagos (GS)
- Meritxell Batet Lamaña (GS)
- José María Becana Sanahuja (GS)
- Mario Bedera Bravo (GS)
- José Ramón Beloki Guerra (GV (EAJ-PNV))
- José María Benegas Haddad (GS)
- Ernest Benito Serra (GS)
- Raimundo Benzal Román (GS)
- José Luis Bermejo Fernández (GP)
- José Antonio Bermúdez de Castro Fernández (GP)
- Leopoldo Bertrand (GP)
- José Blanco López (GS)
- Rosa Delia Blanco Terán (GS)
- Feliciano Blázquez Sánchez (GP)
- Rosa María Bonàs Pahisa (GER-ERC)
- Jaime Ignacio del Burgo Tajadura (GP)
- Tomás Burgos Gallego (GP)
- Mercedes Cabrera Calvo-Sotelo (GS)
- Carlos Javier Cabrera Matos (GP)
- Jesús Caldera Sánchez-Capitán (GS)
- Joaquín Calomarde Gramage (GMx)
- José Ramón Calpe Saera (GP)
- Carmen Calvo Poyato (GS)
- Susana Camarero Benítez (GP)
- Herick Manuel Campos Arteseros (GS)
- Miguel Antonio Campoy Suárez (GP)
- Carles Campuzano i Canadés (GC-CiU)
- Francesc Canet Coma (GER-ERC)
- Laia Cañigueral Olivé (GER-ERC)
- Mª Amelia Caracuel del Olmo (GP)
- Mª Luisa Carcedo Roces (GS)
- Francisco Xavier Carro Garrote (GS)
- Yolanda Casaus Rodríguez (GS)
- María del Carmen Castellano Rodríguez (GP)
- Fernando Vicente Castelló Boronat (GP)
- Carolina Castillejo Hernández (GS)
- Pilar del Castillo Vera (GP)
- Alicia Castro Masaveu (GP)
- Olivia Cedrés Rodríguez (GS)
- Agustí Cerdà Argent (GER-ERC)
- Carme Chacón Piqueras (GS)
- Ciprià Ciscar (GS)
- Gabriel Cisneros Laborda (GP)
- Mª Mercedes Coello Fernández-Trujillo (GS)
- Mª Montserrat Colldeforns i Sol (GS)
- Francisco Contreras Pérez (GS)
- Juan Carlos Corcuera Plaza (GS)
- Lucila Corral Ruiz (GS)
- Elvira Cortajarena Iturrioz (GS)
- Miguel Ángel Cortés Martín (GP)
- Juan Costa Climent (GP)
- María Esther Couto Rivas (GS)
- Raquel de la Cruz Valentín (GS)
- Jesús Cuadrado Bausela (GS)
- Álvaro Cuesta Martínez (GS)
- Antonio Cuevas Delgado (GS)
- Teresa Cunillera i Mestres (GS)
- Celso Luis Delgado Arce (GP)
- Manuel Ceferino Díaz Díaz (GS)
- Susana Díaz Pacheco (GS)
- Máximo Ramón Díaz-Cano del Rey (GS)
- Clementina Díez de Baldeón García (GS)
- Josep Antoni Duran i Lleida (GC-CiU)
- José Ignacio Echániz Salgado (GP)
- Mª Remedios Elías Cordón (GS)
- Juan Julián Elola Ramón (GS)
- Gabriel Elorriaga Pisarik (GP)
- Salvador de la Encina Ortega (GS)
- Antonio Erias Rey (GP)
- Josu Iñaki Erkoreka Gervasio (GV (EAJ-PNV))
- María Escudero Sánchez (GS)
- Aitor Esteban Bravo (GV (EAJ-PNV))
- Héctor Esteve Ferrer (GP)
- Esperança Esteve Ortega (GS)
- Rafael Estrella Pedrola (GS)
- Enrique Fajarnés Ribas (GP)
- Esperança Farrera Granja (GS)
- Adolfo Fernández Aguilar (GP)
- Mª Olaia Fernández Davila (GMx)
- María Teresa Fernández de la Vega Sanz (GS)
- Arsenio Fernández de Mesa Díaz del Río (GP)
- Jorge Fernández Díaz (GP)
- Daniel Fernández González (GS)
- Francisco Miguel Fernández Marugán (GS)
- Isidro Fernández Rozada (GP)
- Luis Fernández Santos (GS)
- Blanca Fernández-Capel Baños (GP)
- Javier Fernández-Lasquetty y Blanc (GP)
- María Amparo Ferrando Sendra (GP)
- Alberto Fidalgo Francisco (GS)
- José Folgado Blanco (GP)
- María Ángeles Font Bonmatí (GP)
- Juan Bernardo Fuentes Curbelo (GS)
- Mª Isabel Fuentes González (GS)
- Sebastián Fuentes Guzmán (GS)
- Ana María Fuentes Pacheco (GS)
- José Luis Galache Cortés (GS)
- Luis Gámir Casares (GP)
- Francisco Javier García Breva (GS)
- Joaquín María García Díez (GP)
- Mª Carme García Suárez (GIU-ICV)
- Antonia García Valls (GS)
- Elena García-Alcañiz Calvo (GP)
- Dolores García-Hierro Caraballo (GS)
- Julia García-Valdecasas Salgado (GP)
- Alberto Garre López (GP)
- Francisco de Asís Garrido Peña (GS)
- Ignacio Gil Lázaro (GP)
- Javier Gómez Darmendrail (GP)
- Mª Gloria Gómez Santamaría (GS)
- Concepción González Gutiérrez (GP)
- Armando González López (GP)
- José Miguel González Moraga (GP)
- Francisco Antonio González Pérez (GP)
- Adolfo Luis González Rodríguez (GP)
- Pilar González Segura (GP)
- Carlos González Serna (GS)
- Sebastián González Vázquez (GP)
- Pilar Grande Pesquero (GS)
- Luis de Grandes Pascual (GP)
- Pere Grau i Buldú (GC-CiU)
- Alfonso Guerra González (GS)
- Juan Carlos Guerra Zunzunegui (GP)
- Josep María Guinart Solá (GC-CiU)
- Antonio Gutiérrez Molina (GP)
- Antonio Gutiérrez Vegara (GS)
- Miguel Ángel Heredia Díaz (GS)
- Carmen Hermosín Bono (GS)
- Rafael Antonio Hernando Fraile (GP)
- Antonio Hernando Vera (GS)
- Íñigo Herrera Martínez de Campos (GP)
- Joan Herrera Torres (GIU-ICV)
- María Soledad Herrero Sainz-Rozas (GS)
- Luis Ángel Hierro Recio (GS)
- Manuela Holgado Flores (GS)
- Manuel Huertas Vicente (GS)
- Jordi Jané i Guasch (GC-CiU)
- Ramón Jáuregui Atondo (GS)
- Agustín Jiménez Pérez (GS)
- María Rosario Juaneda Zaragoza (GS)
- Carmen Juanes Barciela (GS)
- José Antonio Labordeta Subías (GMx)
- Santiago Lanzuela Marina (GP)
- Rafael Lapeña Gil (GP)
- María Teresa de Lara Carbó (GP)
- Begoña Lasagabaster Olazábal (GMx)
- José María Lassalle Ruiz (GP)
- Joaquín Leguina Herrán (GS)
- Jaime Lissavetzky Díez (GS)
- Mª Luisa Lizarraga Gisbert (GS)
- Gaspar Llamazares Trigo (GIU-ICV)
- Verónica Lope Fontagne (GP)
- Óscar López Águeda (GS)
- Juan Fernando López Aguilar (GS)
- Diego López Garrido (GS)
- Isabel López i Chamosa (GS)
- Germán Augusto López Iglesias (GP)
- María Pilar López Rodríguez (GS)
- Carmelo López Villena (GS)
- Fernando López-Amor García (GP)
- Jesús López-Medel Báscones (GP)
- Antonio Louro Goyanes (GS)
- Teófilo de Luis Rodríguez (GP)
- José Madero Jarabo (GP)
- Eduardo Madina Muñoz (GS)
- Ana María Madrazo Díaz (GP)
- Elisenda Malaret García (GS)
- Josep Maldonado i Gili (GC-CiU)
- Jesús Andrés Mancha Cadenas (GP)
- Carlos Mantilla Rodríguez (GP)
- Luis Mardones Sevilla (GMx)
- Manuel Marín González (GS)
- Guillermo Mariscal Anaya (GP)
- Carmen Marón Beltrán (GS)
- Luis Marquínez Marquínez (GP)
- Jordi Marsal Muntalà (GS)
- Remedios Martel Gómez (GS)
- María Eugenia Martín Mendizábal (GP)
- Miguel Ángel Martín Soledad (GP)
- Antonia Martínez Higueras (GS)
- Ángel Martínez Sanjuán (GS)
- José Joaquín Martínez Sieso (GP)
- Vicente Martínez-Pujalte López (GP)
- Manuel Mas i Estela (GS)
- Carmen Matador de Matos (GP)
- Juan José Matarí Sáez (GP)
- José Ramón Mateos Martín (GS)
- Ana Mato Adrover (GP)
- Pablo Matos Mascareño (GP)
- Jaime Mayor Oreja (GP)
- Victorino Mayoral Cortés (GS)
- Jesús Membrado Giner (GS)
- Lourdes Méndez Monasterio (GP)
- Arantza Mendizábal Gorostiaga (GS)
- Jesús Merino Delgado (GP)
- Rafael Merino López (GP)
- José María Michavila Núñez (GP)
- Miguel Ángel Millán Carrascosa (GS)
- Mario Mingo Zapatero (GP)
- María Sandra Moneo Díez (GP)
- María Virtudes Monteserín Rodríguez (GS)
- Macarena Montesinos de Miguel (GP)
- José Montilla (GS)
- Carmen Montón Giménez (GS)
- Cristóbal Ricardo Montoro Romero (GP)
- Jorge Moragas Sánchez (GP)
- Juan Morano Masa (GP)
- Miguel Ángel Moratinos Cuyaubé (GS)
- Juan Manuel Moreno Bonilla (GP)
- Ramón Moreno Bustos (GP)
- Víctor Morlán Gracia (GS)
- Juan Moscoso del Prado Hernández (GS)
- María Montserrat Muñoz de Diego (GIU-ICV)
- Pedro José Muñoz González (GS)
- Miriam Muñoz Resta (GS)
- María Gràcia Muñoz Salvà (GS)
- Lourdes Muñoz Santamaría (GS)
- Ángeles Muñoz Uriol (GP)
- Francisco Vicente Murcia Barceló (GP)
- María Dolors Nadal i Aymerich (GP)
- María Encarnación Naharro de Mora (GP)
- María Josefa Naranjo Bravo (GS)
- Cristina Narbona Ruiz (GS)
- Eugenio Nasarre Goicoechea (GP)
- Isaura Navarro Casillas (GIU-ICV)
- Micaela Navarro Garzón (GS)
- Encarnación Niño Rico (GS)
- Daniel Nuevo Hidalgo (GP)
- José Luis del Ojo Torres (GP)
- Emilio Olabarría Muñoz (GV (EAJ-PNV))
- Georgina Oliva i Peña (GER-ERC)
- Isabel María Oliver Sagreras (GS)
- María Asunción Oltra Torres (GP)
- Joan Oms i Llohis (GS)
- Ana María Oramas González-Moro (GMx)
- José Domingo Cipriano Oreiro Rodríguez (GP)
- José Oria Galloso (GS)
- Mª del Carmen Ortiz Rivas (GS)
- Arsenio Pacheco Atienza (GP)
- Julio Padilla Carballada (GP)
- Leire Pajín Iraola (GS)
- Ana Palacio Vallelersundi (GP)
- Montserrat Palma i Muñoz (GS)
- Mª Dolores Pan Vázquez (GP)
- Ana María Pastor Julián (GP)
- Jordi Pedret i Grenzner (GS)
- Alfonso Perales Pizarro (GS)
- María Dolores Pérez Anguita (GS)
- María Soledad Pérez Domínguez (GS)
- Pío Pérez Laserna (GP)
- Ángel Pérez Martínez (GIU-ICV)
- Alfredo Pérez Rubalcaba (GS)
- José Antonio Pérez Tapias (GS)
- Mª Mercè Pigem Palmés (GC-CiU)
- Margarita Pin Arboledas (GS)
- Ángel Pintado Barbanoj (GP)
- José Pliego Cubero (GS)
- Rosa Lucía Polonio Contreras (GS)
- María Josefa Ponce Aguilera (GS)
- María José Porteiro García (GS)
- Jesús María Posada Moreno (GP)
- Patricia del Pozo Fernández (GP)
- María Isabel Pozuelo Meño (GS)
- Gabino Puche Rodríguez-Acosta (GP)
- Joan Puig Cordón (GER-ERC)
- Mª Dolores Puig Gasol (GS)
- Joan Puigcercós (GER-ERC)
- María del Carmen Quintanilla Barba (GP)
- Sebastián Quirós Pulgar (GS)
- Mariano Rajoy Brey (GP)
- Jordi Ramón Torres (GER-ERC)
- Mª Angels Ramón-Llin i Martínez (GP)
- Juan Luis Rascón Ortega (GS)
- Rodrigo de Rato Figaredo (GP)
- Cándido Reguera Díaz (GP)
- César Antonio Rico Ruiz (GP)
- Francesc Ricomá de Castellarnau (GP)
- Vicente Ripa González (GS)
- Gloria Elena Rivero Alcover (GS)
- Paulino Rivero Baute (GCC-NC)
- Gonzalo Robles Orozco (GP)
- Mª Elvira Rodríguez Herrer (GP)
- Mª Dolores Rodríguez López (GP)
- María Soraya Rodríguez Ramos (GS)
- Román Rodríguez Rodríguez (GMx)
- Francisco Rodríguez Sánchez (GMx)
- José Luis Rodríguez Zapatero (GS)
- Beatriz Rodríguez-Salmones Cabeza (GP)
- María Mercedes Roldós Caballero (GP)
- Rafael Román Guerrero (GS)
- Miguel Ángel de la Rosa Martín (GP)
- Luisa Fernanda Rudi Úbeda (GP)
- María Consuelo Rumí Ibáñez (GS)
- María Soraya Sáenz de Santamaría Antón (GP)
- Eva Sáenz Royo (GS)
- Àlex Sáez Jubero (GS)
- María Jesús Sainz García (GP)
- Mª Isabel Salazar Bello (GS)
- María Salom Coll (GP)
- Juan Salord Torrent (GP)
- Carlos Casimiro Salvador Armendáriz (GP)
- María Carmen Sánchez Díaz (GS)
- María Pía Sánchez Fernández (GP)
- Julio César Sánchez Fierro (GP)
- Celinda Sánchez García (GP)
- Josep Sánchez i Llibre (GC-CiU)
- María Soledad Sánchez Jódar (GS)
- José Avelino Sánchez Menéndez (GP)
- Aurelio Sánchez Ramos (GP)
- María José Sánchez Rubio (GS)
- Alicia Sánchez-Camacho Pérez (GP)
- Juan Santaella Porras (GP)
- Josep Antoni Santamaría i Mateo (GS)
- Gustavo Adolfo Santana Martel (GS)
- Pedro Saura García (GS)
- José Segura Clavell (GS)
- María Enriqueta Seller Roca de Togores (GP)
- Juana Serna Masiá (GS)
- Jordi Sevilla Segura (GS)
- Narciso Sicilia Ávalos (GS)
- Julián Simón de la Torre (GS)
- Roberto Soravilla Fernández (GP)
- Federico Souvirón García (GP)
- Celestino Suárez González (GS)
- Domingo Miguel Tabuyo Romero (GS)
- Joan Tardà i Coma (GER-ERC)
- Vicente Tirado Ochoa (GP)
- Mercedes Toledo Silvestre (GS)
- Luis Juan Tomás García (GS)
- Baudilio Tomé Muguruza (GP)
- Ana Torme Pardo (GP)
- Clemencia Torrado Rey (GS)
- Ricardo Torres Balaguer (GS)
- Siro Torres García (GS)
- Luis de Torres Gómez (GP)
- José Andrés Torres Mora (GS)
- Gerardo Torres Sahuquillo (GS)
- Javier Torres Vela (GS)
- Federico Trillo-Figueroa Martínez-Conde (GP)
- Agustín Turiel Sandín (GS)
- Iñaki Txueka Isasti (GV (EAJ-PNV))
- Pilar Unzalu Pérez de Eulate (GS)
- Margarita Uría Etxebarría (GV (EAJ-PNV))
- Francisco Utrera Mora (GP)
- José Félix Vadillo Arnaez (GP)
- María Amparo Valcarce García (GS)
- Francesc Vallès Vives (GS)
- Francisco Vañó Ferre (GP)
- Ana Belén Vázquez Blanco (GP)
- Francisco Andrés Veiga Soto (GS)
- Rosario Velasco García (GS)
- Elvira Velasco Morillo (GP)
- Juan Carlos Vera Pro (GP)
- Jordi Vilajoana Rovira (GC-CiU)
- Mª Teresa Villagrasa Pérez (GS)
- Celia Villalobos (GP)
- Francisco José Villar García-Moreno (GP)
- Julio Villarrubia Mediavilla (GS)
- Jordi Xuclà i Costa (GC-CiU)
- Eduardo Zaplana Hernández-Soro (GP)
