= Same-sex marriage in Spain =

Same-sex marriage has been legal in Spain since July 3, 2005. In 2004, the nation's newly elected government, led by Prime Minister José Luis Rodríguez Zapatero of the Socialist Workers' Party, began a campaign to legalize same-sex marriage, including the right of adoption by same-sex couples. After much debate, a law permitting same-sex marriage was passed by the Cortes Generales (the Spanish Parliament, composed of the Senate and the Congress of Deputies) by a vote of 187–147 on June 30, 2005, and published on July 2. The law took effect the next day, making Spain the third country in the world to allow same-sex couples to marry on a national level, after the Netherlands and Belgium, and 17 days ahead of the right being extended across all of Canada.

Roman Catholic authorities were adamantly opposed, criticising what they regarded as the weakening of the meaning of marriage, despite support from 66% of the population. Other associations expressed concern over the possibility of lesbian and gay couples adopting children. After its approval, the conservative People's Party challenged the law in the Constitutional Court. Approximately 4,500 same-sex couples married in Spain during the first year of the law. Shortly after the law was passed, questions arose about the legal status of marriages to non-Spaniards whose countries did not permit same-sex marriage. A decision from the Ministry of Justice stated that the country's same-sex marriage law allows a Spanish citizen to marry a non-Spaniard regardless of whether that person's homeland recognizes the union. At least one partner must be a Spanish citizen in order to marry, although two non-Spaniards may marry if they both have legal residence in Spain.

Rodríguez Zapatero and the Socialist Workers' Party were re-elected in the 2008 election, but the next election in 2011 delivered a landslide victory to the People's Party. Prime Minister Mariano Rajoy said he opposed same-sex marriage, but any decision about repealing the law would be made only after the ruling of the Constitutional Court. On November 6, 2012, the law was upheld by the court with eight support votes and three against. Minister of Justice Alberto Ruiz-Gallardón announced that the government would abide by the ruling and the law would not be repealed.

== Legal history ==
Laws regarding same-sex partnerships in Europe¹ Marriage Civil union Limited domestic recognition (cohabitation) Unrecognized Constitution limits marriage to opposite-sex couples ¹ May include recent laws or court decisions that have not yet entered into effect.

=== Background and summary ===
The first law recognising cohabiting same-sex couples was passed in 1994 for the purpose of providing limited legal rights with regard to renting. During the 1990s and early 2000s, several city councils and autonomous communities opened registries for de facto unions (Spanish: unión de hecho, pareja de hecho or pareja estable) (Note: In Spain's regional and recognized minority languages: Catalan: unió de fet (pronounced [uniˈo ðə, ðe fet]), or parella estable (pronounced [pəˈɾɛʎə, -ɾə-, paˈɾeʎa əsˈtab.blə, esˈtable]); Galician: parella de feito (pronounced [paˈɾeɟɐ ðɪ ˈfejtʊ]), or parella estable (pronounced [paˈɾeɟɐ esˈtaβlɪ]); Basque: izatezko bikote (pronounced [is̻ates̻ko βikote]), or bikote egonkorra (pronounced [bikote eɣonkora]); Asturian: xunión de fechu (pronounced [ʃuˈnjon de ˈfetʃu]), or pareya estable (pronounced [paˈɾeʝa esˈtaβle]); Aragonese: parella de feito (pronounced [paˈɾeʎa ðe ˈfejto]); Occitan: coble estable (pronounced [ˈkuple esˈtab.ble])) allowing benefits for unmarried couples of any sex, although the effect is mainly symbolic. Registries were eventually created in all 17 of Spain's autonomous communities; in Catalonia (1998), Aragon (1999), Navarre (2000), Castile-La Mancha (2000), Valencia (2001), the Balearic Islands (2001), Madrid (2001), Asturias (2002), Castile and León (2002), Andalusia (2002), the Canary Islands (2003), Extremadura (2003), the Basque Country (2003), Cantabria (2005), Galicia (2008), La Rioja (2010), and Murcia (2018), and in both autonomous cities; Ceuta (1998) and Melilla (2008). Spanish law already allowed single people to adopt children; thus, a same-sex couple could undertake a de facto adoption, but the partner who was not the legal parent had no rights if the relationship ended or if the legal parent died. Same-sex marriages were not legal in the autonomous communities, because the Spanish Constitution gives the State the sole power to legislate marriage.

The first legal proposals to legalize same-sex marriage occurred in 2001. The Aragonese Union, United Left, the Spanish Socialist Workers' Party (PSOE), the Initiative for Catalonia and the Galician Nationalist Bloc introduced five different measures to the Cortes Generales, but all were ultimately defeated by the People's Party, in government at the time under José María Aznar. The Spanish Socialist Workers' Party manifesto for the 2004 general election included the pledge of amending the Civil Code to introduce same-sex marriage, granting it the same status as heterosexual marriage in order to "ensure full social and legal equality for lesbians and gays". After the Socialists' victory in the election, Prime Minister José Luis Rodríguez Zapatero promised at his inauguration address to bring this change forward: "The moment has finally arrived to end once and for all the intolerable discrimination which many Spaniards suffer because of their sexual preferences. ... As a result, we will modify the Civil Code to recognize their equal right to marriage with the resulting effects over inheritance, labor rights and social security protection". On June 30, 2004, Minister of Justice Juan Fernando López Aguilar announced that the Congress of Deputies had provisionally approved a government plan for legislation to extend the right of marriage to same-sex couples. López Aguilar also announced two propositions, introduced by the regional Convergence and Union party of Catalonia: one would introduce legal status for both opposite-sex and same-sex common-law unions (parejas de hecho (pronounced [paˈɾexas ðe ˈetʃo]), "de facto unions"), while the other would permit transgender people to legally change their name and sex designation without the requirement of surgery. The bill regarding same-sex marriage was approved by the Council of Ministers on October 1, 2004, submitted to Parliament on December 31, and passed by the Congress of Deputies on April 21, 2005. However, it was rejected on June 22, 2005 by the Senate, where the opposition People's Party held a plurality of the seats. The bill was returned to the lower house, which holds the power to override the Senate, and final approval was given to the bill on June 30, 2005, with 187 "yes" votes, 147 "no" votes, and 4 abstentions.

With the final approval and enactment of the bill on July 2, 2005, Spain became the third country in the world to formally legalize same-sex marriages nationwide, after the Netherlands and Belgium. The first same-sex wedding took place eight days after the bill became law, and was performed in the city council chamber of the Madrid suburb of Tres Cantos between Carlos Baturín and Emilio Menéndez. The first same-sex marriage between women took place in Barcelona eleven days later. In the Basque Country, the first marriage for a male couple was performed in Vitoria-Gasteiz, and the first marriage for a lesbian couple occurred in Errenteria.

In spite of these steps toward equal treatment, a legal flaw remained: if children were born within a lesbian marriage, the non-biological mother was not legally regarded as a parent; she still had to undergo the lengthy financial process of adoption. This right was granted to heterosexual couples (married or not), where a stepfather could declare his wife's children to be his without further process. On November 7, 2006, the Spanish Parliament amended the law on assisted reproduction, allowing the non-biological mother to be automatically regarded as a parent alongside her female spouse.

=== Ratification of Law 13/2005 ===
The Spanish Parliament voting for same-sex marriage, April 21, 2005

The projected bill announced on June 30, 2004 by the Minister of Justice was studied by the General Council of the Judiciary. Although the General Council admitted that the existing discrimination against homosexuals could not be condoned, it was quite critical about extending marriage toward same-sex couples (including collateral adoption). It argued that the extension was not demanded by the Constitution, and that ending discrimination could be achieved through other legal means, such as the extension of civil unions.

Despite this negative report, the Zapatero Government presented the bill to Congress on October 1, 2004. With the exception of the People's Party and members of the Democratic Union of Catalonia, the different parliamentary parties favoured the reform. On April 21, 2005, Congress approved the bill, with 183 "yes" votes (including a member of the People's Party) and 136 "no" votes and 6 abstentions. The bill to allow same-sex marriage in Spain was short; it added a new paragraph to Article 44 of the Civil Code, saying that: Matrimony shall have the same requisites and effects regardless of whether the persons involved are of the same or different sex. (Note: In some languages of Spain: Spanish: El matrimonio tendrá los mismos requisitos y efectos cuando ambos contrayentes sean del mismo o de diferente sexo.; Catalan: El matrimoni tindrà els mateixos requisits i efectes quan ambdós contraents siguin del mateix o de diferent sexe.; Galician: O matrimonio terá os mesmos requisitos e efectos cando ambos os contraentes sexan do mesmo ou diferente sexo.; Basque: Ezkontzak betekizun eta ondore berberak izango ditu, bi ezkongaiak sexu berdinekoak izan zein desberdinekoak izan.; Occitan: Eth matrimòni aurà es madeishi requisits e efèctes quan ambdús contraents siguen deth madeish o de diferent sèxe.)

April 21, 2005 vote in the Congress of Deputies
Party	Voted for	Voted against	Abstained	Absent (Did not vote)
G Spanish Socialist Workers' Party	157: María del Rosario de Aburto Baselga; José Acosta Cubero; Carmen Alborch; María Angustias Alcázar Escribano; Alejandro Alonso Núñez; José Antonio Alonso; Eloisa Álvarez Oteo; Emilio Amuedo Moral; Francesc Antich; Elviro Aranda Álvarez; Erasmo Juan Manuel Armas Darias; María Antonia de Armengol Criado; María del Mar Arnáiz García; Alfredo Arola Blanquet; Javier Barrero López; Juan Antonio Barrio de Penagos; Meritxell Batet Lamaña; José María Becana Sanahuja; Mario Bedera Bravo; José María Benegas; Ernest Benito Serra; Raimundo Benzal Román; José Blanco López; Rosa Delia Blanco Terán; Mercedes Cabrera; Jesús Caldera Sánchez-Capitán; Carmen Calvo Poyato; Herick Campos Arteseros; María Luisa Carcedo Roces; Francisco Xavier Carro Garrote; Yolanda Casaus Rodríguez; Carolina Castillejo Hernández; Olivia Cedrés Rodríguez; Carme Chacón; Cipriá Císcar Casabán; María Mercedes Coello Fernández-Trujillo; Montserrat Colldeforns i Sol; Francisco Contreras Pérez; Juan Carlos Corcuera Plaza; Lucila Corral Ruiz; Elvira Cortajarena Iturrioz; María Esther Couto Rivas; Raquel de la Cruz Valentín; Jesús Cuadrado Bausela; Alvaro Cuesta Martínez; Antonio Cuevas Delgado; Teresa Cunillera i Mestres; Manuel Ceferino Díaz Díaz; Susana Díaz Pacheco; Clementina Díez de Baldeón García; María Remedios Elías Cordón; Juan Julián Elola Ramón; Salvador A. de la Encina Ortega; María Escudero Sánchez; Esperança Esteve Ortega; Rafael Estrella Pedrola; Esperança Farrera Granja; María Teresa Fernández de la Vega; Daniel Fernández González; Francisco Miguel Fernández Marugán; Luis Fernández Santos; Alberto Fidalgo Francisco; María Isabel Fuentes González; Sebastián Fuentes Guzmán; Ana María Fuentes Pacheco; José Luis Galache Cortés; Dolores García-Hierro Caraballo; Antonia García Valls; Francisco de Asís Garrido Peña; María Gloria Gómez Santamaría; Carlos González Serna; Pilar Grande Pesquero; Alfonso Guerra; Antonio Gutiérrez Vegara; Miguel Ángel Heredia Díaz; María del Carmen Hermosín Bono; Antonio Hernando Vera; Soledad Herrero Sainz-Rozas; Luis Ángel Hierro Recio; Manuela Holgado Flores; Manuel Huertas Vicente; Ramón Jáuregui Atondo; Agustín Jiménez Pérez; Carmen Juanes Barciela; Joaquín Leguina Herrán; María Lluïsa Lizarraga Gisbert; Óscar López Águeda; Juan Fernando López Aguilar; Diego López Garrido; María Isabel López i Chamosa; María Pilar López Rodríguez; Carmelo López Villena; Antonio Louro Goyanes; Eduardo Madina Muñoz; Elisenda Malaret García; Carmen Marón Beltrán; Jordi Marsal Muntalá; Remedios Martel Gómez; María Antonia Martínez Higueras; Ángel Martínez Sanjuán; Manuel Mas i Estela; José Ramón Mateos Martín; Victorino Mayoral Cortés; Jesús Membrado Giner; Arantza Mendizábal Gorostiaga; María Virtudes Monteserín Rodríguez; José Montilla; Carmen Montón; Juan Moscoso del Prado Hernández; Pedro José Muñoz González; Lourdes Muñoz Santamaría; Cristina Narbona Ruiz; Encarnación Niño Rico; Isabel María Oliver Sagreras; José Oria Galloso; María del Carmen Ortiz Rivas; Montserrat Palma i Muñoz; Jordi Pedret Grenzner; Alfonso Perales Pizarro; María Dolores Pérez Anguita; María Soledad Pérez Domínguez; Alfredo Pérez Rubalcaba; Margarita Pin Arboledas; José Pliego Cubero; Rosa Lucía Polonio Contreras; María Josefa Porteiro García; María Isabel Pozuelo Meño; María Dolors Puig Gasol; Sebastián Quirós Pulgar; Juan Luis Rascón Ortega; María Soraya Rodríguez Ramos; Rafael Román Guerrero; Eva Sáenz Royo; Àlex Sàez Jubero; María Isabel Salazar Bello; Mamen Sánchez; María Josefa Sánchez Rubio; Josep Antoni Santamaría i Mateo; Pedro Saura García; Juana Serna Masiá; Jordi Sevilla Segura; Julián Simón de la Torre; Celestino Suárez González; Domingo Miguel Tabuyo Romero; Luis Juan Tomás García; Clemencia Torrado Rey; Ricard Torres Balaguer; Siro Torres García; José Andrés Torres Mora; Gerardo Torres Sahuquillo; Javier Torres Vela; Agustín Turiel Sandín; Pilar Unzalu Pérez de Eulate; Francesc Vallès Vives; Rosario Velasco García; Teresa Villagrasa Pérez; Julio Villarrubia Mediavilla	–	–	7: Magdalena Álvarez; María Rosario Juaneda Zaragoza; Manuel Marín; María Gràcia Muñoz Salvà; Gloria Elena Rivero Alcover; José Luis Rodríguez Zapatero; Miguel Ángel Moratinos
People's Party	1: Celia Villalobos	133: Ángel Jesús Acebes Paniagua; Juan Manuel Albendea Pabón; Amador Álvarez; Carlos Aragonés Mendiguchía; Miguel Arias Cañete; Gustavo de Arístegui y San Román; Elías Arribas Aragonés; Marisa Arrúe Bergareche; Ignacio Astarloa; Manuel Atencia Robledo; Andrés J. Ayala Sánchez; José Eugenio Azpiroz Villar; Alejandro Fco. Ballestero de Diego; Fátima Báñez García; Rogelio Baón; Miguel Barrachina Ros; José Luis Bermejo Fernández; José Antonio Bermúdez de Castro Fernández; Leopoldo Bertrand; Jaime del Burgo; Tomás Burgos Gallego; Carlos Javier Cabrera Matos; Joaquín Calomarde; José Ramón Calpe Saera; Susana Camarero; Miguel Campoy Suárez; María Amelia Caracuel del Olmo; Fernando Vicente Castelló Boronat; Gabriel Cisneros Laborda; Miguel Ángel Cortés Marín; José Ignacio Echániz Salgado; Gabriel Elorriaga Pisarik; Antonio Erias Rey; Héctor Esteve Ferrer; Enrique Fajarnés Ribas; Adolfo Fernández Aguilar; Arsenio Fernández de Mesa Díaz del Río; Jorge Fernández Díaz; Javier Fernández-Lasquetty Blanc; José Folgado Blanco; María Ángeles Font Bonmati; Luis Gámir; Joaquín María García Díez; Julia García-Valdecasas Salgado; Alberto Garre López; Ignacio Gil; Javier Gómez Darmendrail; Concepción González Gutiérrez; Armando González López; Francisco Antonio González Pérez; Adolfo Luis González Rodríguez; María del Pilar González Segura; Sebastián González Vázquez; Antonio Gutiérrez Molina; Rafael Hernando Fraile; Iñigo Herrera Martínez Campos; Santiago Lanzuela Marina; María Teresa de Lara Carbó; Verónica Lope Fontagne; Germán López Iglesias; Fernando López-Amor García; Jesús López-Medel Bascones; Teófilo de Luis Rodríguez; José Madero Jarabo; Ana María Madrazo Díaz; Jesús Andrés Mancha Cadenas; Carlos Mantilla Rodríguez; Guillermo Mariscal Anaya; Luis Marquínez Marquínez; María Eugenia Martín Mendizábal; Miguel Ángel Martín Soledad; José Joaquín Martínez Sieso; Vicente Martínez-Pujalte; Carmen Matador de Matos; Juan José Matarí Sáez; Pablo Matos Mascareño; Lourdes Méndez Monasterio; Rafael Merino López; José María Michavila; Mario Mingo Zapatero; Sandra Moneo Díez; Macarena Montesinos de Miguel; Jorge Moragas Sánchez; Juan Morano Masa; Ramón Moreno Bustos; María Ángeles Muñoz Uriol; Francisco Murcia Barceló; Dolors Nadal i Aymerich; María Encarnación Naharro de Mora; Eugenio Nasarre Goicoechea; José Luis del Ojo Torres; María Asunción Oltra Torres; José Domingo Oreiro Rodríguez; Julio Padilla Carballada; Ana Palacio Vallelersundi; María Dolores Pan Vázquez; Ana Pastor Julián; Pío Pérez Laserna; Ángel Pintado Barbanoj; Jesús María Posada Moreno; Patricia del Pozo Fernández; Gabino Puche Rodríguez-Acosta; María del Carmen Quintanilla Barba; María Àngels Ramón-Llin Martínez; Cándido Reguera Díaz; César Antonio Rico Ruiz; Francisco Ricomá de Castellarnau; María Elvira Rodríguez Herrer; Beatriz Rodríguez-Salmones Cabeza; María Mercedes Roldós Caballero; María Jesús Sainz García; María Salom Coll; Juan Salord Torrent; Carlos Casimiro Salvador Armendáriz; Julio César Sánchez Fierro; Celinda Sánchez García; José Avelino Sánchez Menéndez; Aurelio Sánchez Ramos; Juan Santaella Porras; María Enriqueta Seller Roca de Togores; Federico Souvirón García; Baudilio Tomé Muguruza; Ana Torme Pardo; Luis de Torres Gómez; Federico Trillo; Francisco Utrera Mora; José Félix Vadillo Arnáez; Francisco Vañó Ferre; Ana Belén Vázquez Blanco; Elvira Velasco Morillo; Juan Carlos Vera Pró; Francisco José Villar García-Moreno; Eduardo Zaplana	2: Alicia Castro Masaveu; Gonzalo Robles Orozco	12: Javier Arenas; Celso Luis Delgado Arce; Blanca Fernández de Capel Baños; Isidro Fernández Rozada; Juan Carlos Guerra Zunzunegui; José María Lassalle Ruiz; Jesús Merino Delgado; Mariano Rajoy; María Soraya Sáenz de Santamaría Antón; Alicia Sánchez-Camacho i Pérez; María Pía Sánchez Fernández; Roberto Soravilla Fernández
Convergence and Union	2: Carles Campuzano i Canadés; Mercè Pigem i Palmès	3: Pere Grau i Buldú; Josep Maria Guinart i Solà; Josep Sánchez i Llibre	4: Jordi Jané i Guasch; Josep Maldonado i Gili; Jordi Vilajoana i Rovira; Jordi Xuclà i Costa	1: Josep Antoni Duran i Lleida
Republican Left of Catalonia	8: Josep Andreu Domingo; Rosa María Bonàs i Pahisa; Francesc Canet Coma; Agustí Cerdà i Argent; Joan Puig Cordon; Joan Puigcercós; Jordi Ramon Torres; Joan Tardà i Coma	–	–	–
Basque Nationalist Party	5: José Ramón Beloki Guerra; Josu Iñaki Erkoreka Gervasio; Aitor Esteban Bravo; Iñaki Txueka Isasti; Margarita Uria Etxebarria	–	–	2: Pedro María Azpiazu Uriarte; Emilio Olabarría Muñoz
United Left	5: María Carme García Suárez; Joan Herrera Torres; Gaspar Llamazares Trigo; Isaura Navarro; Ángel Pérez Martínez	–	–	–
Canarian Coalition	1: Luis Mardones Sevilla	–	–	2: Paulino Rivero; Román Rodríguez Rodríguez
Galician Nationalist Bloc	1: Francisco Rodríguez Sánchez	–	–	1: María Olaia Fernández Dávila
Chunta Aragonesista	1: José Antonio Labordeta Subías	–	–	–
Eusko Alkartasuna	1: Begoña Lasagabaster Olazabal	–	–	–
Nafarroa Bai	1: María Uxue Barkos Berruezo	–	–	–
Total	183	136	6	25
Total	52.3%	38.9%	1.7%	7.1%

Same-sex marriage in Spain

Cortes Generales
- Long title: Ley 13/2005 por la que se modifica el Código Civil en materia de derecho a contraer matrimonio. (Law 13/2005 that amends the Civil Code regarding the right to contract marriage)
- Enacted: June 30, 2005
- Signed: July 1, 2005
- Introduced by: Prime Minister José Luis Rodríguez Zapatero (PSOE)

Related legislation
- Spanish Civil Code

In accordance with constitutional provisions, the text approved by the Congress was then submitted to the Senate for final approval, change or veto. On June 21, 2005, experts were called to the Senate to debate the issue. The expert's opinions were diverse; some stated that same-sex adoption had no effect on a child's development, except for perhaps a higher tolerance towards homosexuality. However, psychiatrist Aquilino Polaino, called by the People's Party as an expert, called homosexuality a pathology and emotive disorder. Among other assertions that generated debate, he claimed that "many homosexuals have rape abuse antecedents since childhood" and that homosexuals generally come from families with "hostile, alcoholic and distant" fathers, and mothers who were "over protective" toward boys and "cold" toward girls. Prominent People's Party members later rejected Polaino's assertions.

The Senate vetoed the text submitted by the Congress. The veto was proposed by the People's Party, which held the plurality of the seats, and by the Democratic Union of Catalonia, and was approved by 131 "yes" votes and 119 "no" votes and 2 abstentions. As a result, the text was sent back to the Congress. On June 30, 2005, it was approved by Congress, which, in accordance with constitutional provisions, overrode the Senate veto. This was achieved with 187 "yes" votes (including a member of the People's Party, Celia Villalobos), 147 "no" votes, and four abstentions. The veto override implied its approval as law. The vote was held after Zapatero unexpectedly took the floor to speak in its support, saying "We are expanding the opportunities for happiness of our neighbors, our colleagues, our friends and our relatives. At the same time, we are building a more decent society." Mariano Rajoy, the leader of the opposition People's Party, was denied the opportunity to address Congress after Zapatero's appearance, and accused Zapatero of "dividing Spanish society".

June 30, 2005 vote in the Congress of Deputies
Party	Voted for	Voted against	Abstained	Absent (Did not vote)
G Spanish Socialist Workers' Party	159: María del Rosario de Aburto Baselga; José Acosta Cubero; Carmen Alborch; María Angustias Alcázar Escribano; Alejandro Alonso Núñez; José Antonio Alonso; Magdalena Álvarez; Eloisa Álvarez Oteo; Emilio Amuedo Moral; Francesc Antich; Elviro Aranda Álvarez; Erasmo Juan Manuel Armas Darias; María Antonia de Armengol Criado; María del Mar Arnáiz García; Alfredo Arola Blanquet; Javier Barrero López; Juan Antonio Barrio de Penagos; Meritxell Batet Lamaña; José María Becana Sanahuja; Mario Bedera Bravo; José María Benegas; Ernest Benito Serra; Raimundo Benzal Román; Mercedes Cabrera; Jesús Caldera Sánchez-Capitán; Carmen Calvo Poyato; Herick Campos Arteseros; María Luisa Carcedo Roces; Francisco Xavier Carro Garrote; Yolanda Casaus Rodríguez; Carolina Castillejo Hernández; Olivia Cedrés Rodríguez; Carme Chacón; Cipriá Císcar Casabán; María Mercedes Coello Fernández-Trujillo; Montserrat Colldeforns i Sol; Francisco Contreras Pérez; Juan Carlos Corcuera Plaza; Lucila Corral Ruiz; Elvira Cortajarena Iturrioz; María Esther Couto Rivas; Raquel de la Cruz Valentín; Jesús Cuadrado Bausela; Alvaro Cuesta Martínez; Antonio Cuevas Delgado; Teresa Cunillera i Mestres; Manuel Ceferino Díaz Díaz; Susana Díaz Pacheco; Clementina Díez de Baldeón García; María Remedios Elías Cordón; Juan Julián Elola Ramón; Salvador A. de la Encina Ortega; María Escudero Sánchez; Esperança Esteve Ortega; Rafael Estrella Pedrola; Esperança Farrera Granja; María Teresa Fernández de la Vega; Daniel Fernández González; Francisco Miguel Fernández Marugán; Luis Fernández Santos; Alberto Fidalgo Francisco; María Isabel Fuentes González; Sebastián Fuentes Guzmán; Ana María Fuentes Pacheco; José Luis Galache Cortés; Antonia García Valls; Francisco de Asís Garrido Peña; María Gloria Gómez Santamaría; Carlos González Serna; Pilar Grande Pesquero; Alfonso Guerra; Antonio Gutiérrez Vegara; Miguel Ángel Heredia Díaz; María del Carmen Hermosín Bono; Antonio Hernando Vera; Soledad Herrero Sainz-Rozas; Luis Ángel Hierro Recio; Manuela Holgado Flores; Manuel Huertas Vicente; Ramón Jáuregui Atondo; Agustín Jiménez Pérez; María Rosario Juaneda Zaragoza; Carmen Juanes Barciela; Joaquín Leguina Herrán; María Lluïsa Lizarraga Gisbert; Óscar López Águeda; Juan Fernando López Aguilar; Diego López Garrido; María Isabel López i Chamosa; María Pilar López Rodríguez; Carmelo López Villena; Antonio Louro Goyanes; Eduardo Madina Muñoz; Elisenda Malaret García; Manuel Marín; Carmen Marón Beltrán; Jordi Marsal Muntalá; Remedios Martel Gómez; María Antonia Martínez Higueras; Ángel Martínez Sanjuán; Manuel Mas i Estela; José Ramón Mateos Martín; Victorino Mayoral Cortés; Jesús Membrado Giner; Arantza Mendizábal Gorostiaga; María Virtudes Monteserín Rodríguez; José Montilla; Carmen Montón; Juan Moscoso del Prado Hernández; Pedro José Muñoz González; María Gràcia Muñoz Salvà; Lourdes Muñoz Santamaría; Cristina Narbona Ruiz; Encarnación Niño Rico; Isabel María Oliver Sagreras; José Oria Galloso; María del Carmen Ortiz Rivas; Montserrat Palma i Muñoz; Jordi Pedret Grenzner; Alfonso Perales Pizarro; María Dolores Pérez Anguita; Alfredo Pérez Rubalcaba; Margarita Pin Arboledas; José Pliego Cubero; Rosa Lucía Polonio Contreras; María Josefa Porteiro García; María Isabel Pozuelo Meño; María Dolors Puig Gasol; Sebastián Quirós Pulgar; Juan Luis Rascón Ortega; Gloria Elena Rivero Alcover; María Soraya Rodríguez Ramos; José Luis Rodríguez Zapatero; Rafael Román Guerrero; Eva Sáenz Royo; Àlex Sàez Jubero; María Isabel Salazar Bello; María C. Sánchez Díaz; María Josefa Sánchez Rubio; Josep Antoni Santamaría i Mateo; Pedro Saura García; Juana Serna Masiá; Jordi Sevilla Segura; Julián Simón de la Torre; Celestino Suárez González; Domingo Miguel Tabuyo Romero; Luis Juan Tomás García; Clemencia Torrado Rey; Ricard Torres Balaguer; Siro Torres García; José Andrés Torres Mora; Gerardo Torres Sahuquillo; Javier Torres Vela; Agustín Turiel Sandín; Pilar Unzalu Pérez de Eulate; Francesc Vallès Vives; Rosario Velasco García; Teresa Villagrasa Pérez; Julio Villarrubia Mediavilla	–	–	5: José Blanco López; Rosa Delia Blanco Terán; Dolores García-Hierro Caraballo; Miguel Ángel Moratinos; María Soledad Pérez Domínguez
People's Party	1: Celia Villalobos	143: Ángel Jesús Acebes Paniagua; Juan Manuel Albendea Pabón; Amador Álvarez; Carlos Aragonés Mendiguchía; Javier Arenas; Miguel Arias Cañete; Gustavo de Arístegui y San Román; Elías Arribas Aragonés; Marisa Arrúe Bergareche; Ignacio Astarloa; Manuel Atencia Robledo; Andrés J. Ayala Sánchez; José Eugenio Azpiroz Villar; Alejandro Fco. Ballestero de Diego; Fátima Báñez García; Rogelio Baón Ramírez; Miguel Barrachina Ros; José Luis Bermejo Fernández; José Antonio Bermúdez de Castro Fernández; Leopoldo Bertrand de la Riera; Jaime del Burgo; Tomás Burgos Gallego; Carlos Javier Cabrera Matos; Joaquín Calomarde; José Ramón Calpe Saera; Susana Camarero; Miguel Campoy Suárez; María Amelia Caracuel del Olmo; Fernando Vicente Castelló Boronat; Alicia Castro Masaveu; Gabriel Cisneros Laborda; Miguel Ángel Cortés Marín; Celso Luis Delgado Arce; José Ignacio Echániz Salgado; Gabriel Elorriaga Pisarik; Antonio Erias Rey; Héctor Esteve Ferrer; Enrique Fajarnés Ribas; Adolfo Fernández Aguilar; Blanca Fernández de Capel Baños; Arsenio Fernández de Mesa Díaz del Río; Jorge Fernández Díaz; Isidro Fernández Rozada; Javier Fernández-Lasquetty Blanc; José Folgado Blanco; María Ángeles Font Bonmati; Luis Gámir; Joaquín María García Díez; Julia García-Valdecasas Salgado; Alberto Garre López; Ignacio Gil; Javier Gómez Darmendrail; Concepción González Gutiérrez; Armando González López; Francisco Antonio González Pérez; Adolfo Luis González Rodríguez; María del Pilar González Segura; Sebastián González Vázquez; Juan Carlos Guerra Zunzunegui; Antonio Gutiérrez Molina; Iñigo Herrera Martínez Campos; Santiago Lanzuela Marina; María Teresa de Lara Carbó; José María Lassalle Ruiz; Verónica Lope Fontagne; Germán López Iglesias; Fernando López-Amor García; Jesús López-Medel Bascones; Teófilo de Luis Rodríguez; José Madero Jarabo; Ana María Madrazo Díaz; Jesús Andrés Mancha Cadenas; Carlos Mantilla Rodríguez; Guillermo Mariscal Anaya; Luis Marquínez Marquínez; María Eugenia Martín Mendizábal; Miguel Ángel Martín Soledad; José Joaquín Martínez Sieso; Vicente Martínez-Pujalte; Carmen Matador de Matos; Juan José Matarí Sáez; Pablo Matos Mascareño; Lourdes Méndez Monasterio; Jesús Merino Delgado; Rafael Merino López; José María Michavila; Mario Mingo Zapatero; Sandra Moneo Díez; Macarena Montesinos de Miguel; Juan Morano Masa; Ramón Moreno Bustos; María Ángeles Muñoz Uriol; Francisco Murcia Barceló; Dolors Nadal i Aymerich; María Encarnación Naharro de Mora; Eugenio Nasarre Goicoechea; José Luis del Ojo Torres; María Asunción Oltra Torres; José Domingo Oreiro Rodríguez; Julio Padilla Carballada; María Dolores Pan Vázquez; Ana Pastor Julián; Pío Pérez Laserna; Ángel Pintado Barbanoj; Jesús María Posada Moreno; Patricia del Pozo Fernández; Gabino Puche Rodríguez-Acosta; María del Carmen Quintanilla Barba; Mariano Rajoy; María Angels Ramón-Llin Martínez; Cándido Reguera Díaz; César Antonio Rico Ruiz; Francisco Ricomá de Castellarnau; Gonzalo Robles Orozco; María Elvira Rodríguez Herrer; Beatriz Rodríguez-Salmones Cabeza; María Mercedes Roldós Caballero; María Soraya Sáenz de Santamaría Antón; María Jesús Sainz García; María Salom Coll; Juan Salord Torrent; Carlos Casimiro Salvador Armendáriz; Julio César Sánchez Fierro; Celinda Sánchez García; José Avelino Sánchez Menéndez; Aurelio Sánchez Ramos; Alicia Sánchez-Camacho i Pérez; Juan Santaella Porras; María Enriqueta Seller Roca de Togores; Roberto Soravilla Fernández; Federico Souvirón García; Baudilio Tomé Muguruza; Ana Torme Pardo; Luis de Torres Gómez; Federico Trillo; Francisco Utrera Mora; José Félix Vadillo Arnáez; Francisco Vañó Ferre; Ana Belén Vázquez Blanco; Elvira Velasco Morillo; Juan Carlos Vera Pró; Francisco José Villar García-Moreno; Eduardo Zaplana	–	4: Rafael Hernando Fraile; Jorge Moragas Sánchez; Ana Palacio Vallelersundi; María Pía Sánchez Fernández
Convergence and Union	2: Carles Campuzano i Canadés; Mercè Pigem i Palmès	4: Josep Antoni Duran i Lleida; Pere Grau i Buldú; Josep Maria Guinart i Solà; Josep Sánchez i Llibre	4: Jordi Jané i Guasch; Josep Maldonado i Gili; Jordi Vilajoana i Rovira; Jordi Xuclà i Costa	–
Republican Left of Catalonia	8: Josep Andreu Domingo; Rosa María Bonàs i Pahisa; Francesc Canet Coma; Agustí Cerdà i Argent; Joan Puig Cordon; Joan Puigcercós; Jordi Ramon Torres; Joan Tardà i Coma	–	–	–
Basque Nationalist Party	5: Pedro María Azpiazu Uriarte; José Ramón Beloki Guerra; Aitor Esteban Bravo; Emilio Olabarría Muñoz; Margarita Uria Etxebarria	–	–	2: Iñaki Txueka Isasti; Josu Iñaki Erkoreka Gervasio
United Left	5: María Carme García Suárez; Joan Herrera Torres; Gaspar Llamazares Trigo; Isaura Navarro; Ángel Pérez Martínez	–	–	–
Canarian Coalition	3: Luis Mardones Sevilla; Paulino Rivero; Román Rodríguez Rodríguez	–	–	–
Galician Nationalist Bloc	2: María Olaia Fernández Dávila; Francisco Rodríguez Sánchez	–	–	–
Chunta Aragonesista	1: José Antonio Labordeta Subías	–	–	–
Eusko Alkartasuna	–	–	–	1: Begoña Lasagabaster Olazabal
Nafarroa Bai	1: María Uxue Barkos Berruezo	–	–	–
Total	187	147	4	12
Total	53.4%	42.0%	1.1%	3.4%

When the media asked King Juan Carlos I if he would sign the bill that was being debated in the Cortes Generales, he answered that he was the King of Spain, not of Belgium – a reference to King Baudouin of Belgium, who refused to sign the Belgian law legalising abortion. For the King to withhold his royal assent, it would effect a veto of the legislation. However, the King gave his royal assent to the law on July 1, 2005, and the law was gazetted in the Boletín Oficial del Estado on July 2, and came into effect on July 3. The King received criticism by Carlist and other far-right conservatives for signing the legislation.

=== Reactions ===
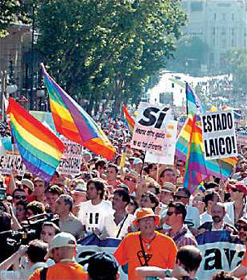
Gay march celebrating 2005 Pride Day and the legalisation of same-sex marriage in Spain

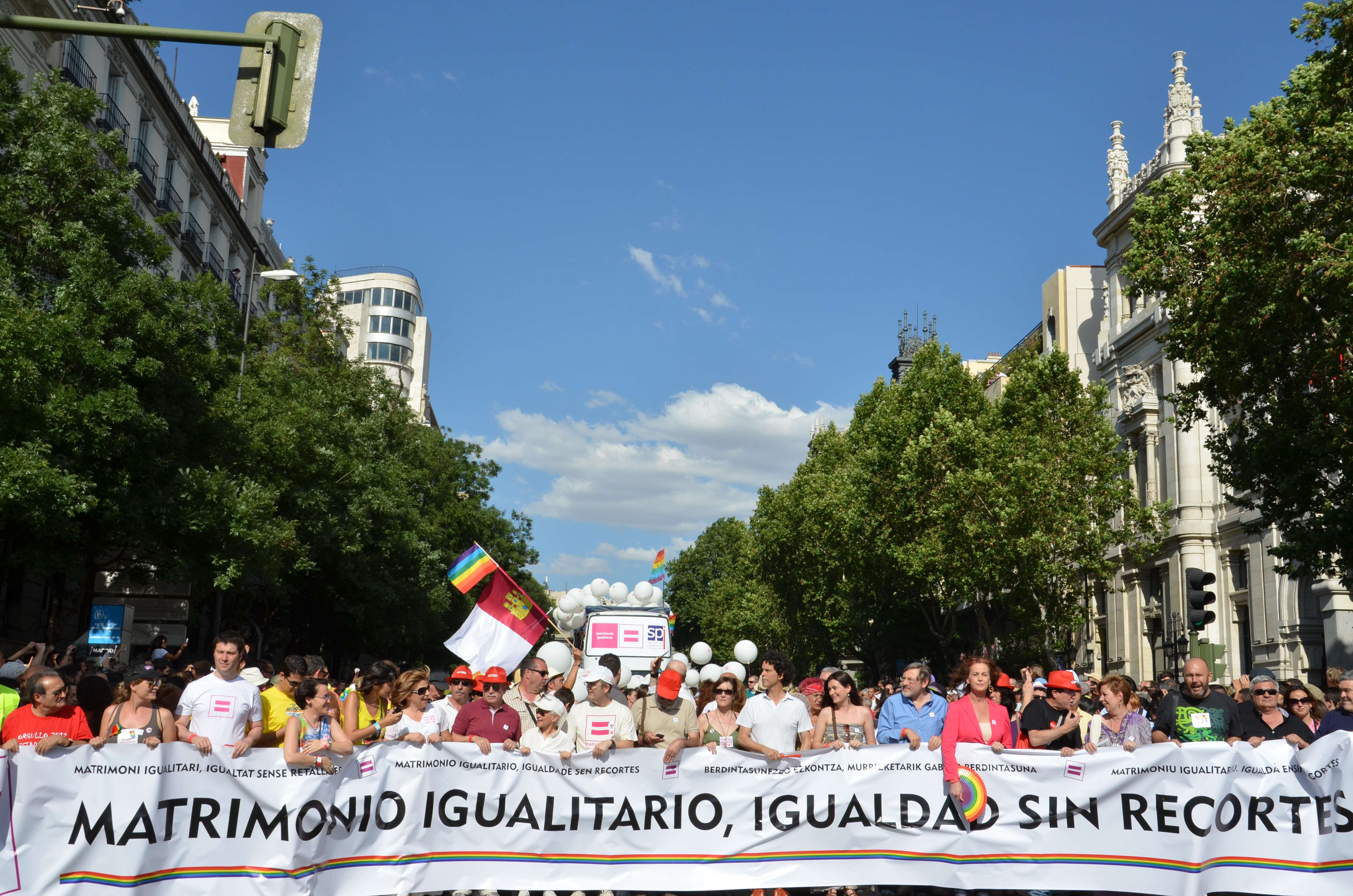
Participants at a demonstration in favor of same-sex marriage rights in June 2012, Madrid

The bill's passage was met with concern by Catholic authorities, including Pope John Paul II—who warned of "a weakening of family values"—and his successor Pope Benedict XVI. Cardinal López Trujillo, president of the Pontifical Council for the Family, said the Church was making an urgent call for freedom of conscience for Catholics and appealing to them to resist the law. He said every profession linked with implementing same-sex marriages should oppose it, even if it meant losing their jobs. LGBT rights supporters argued that while the Catholic Church also formally opposed opposite-sex, non-religious marriage, its opposition was not as vocal; for example, the Church did not object to the marriage of Prince Felipe to Letizia Ortiz, who had divorced from a previous civil marriage. The Church was unable to gather enough support to derail the bill, even though more than 60% of Spaniards identify as members of the Catholic faith. Sociologists believed this may be due to a significant increase of cultural liberalism in the realm of individual rights in recent years, where the Church traditionally had most influence, especially on family issues. A poll showed that three quarters of Spaniards believed the church hierarchy was out of touch with social reality. A complementary explanation might be that the Church's influence on Spaniards declined after the death in 1975 of General Francisco Franco, whose regime was closely linked to the Church.

Prime Minister Zapatero responded to church criticism by saying:

There is no damage to marriage or to the family in allowing two people of the same sex to get married. Rather, these citizens now have the ability to organize their lives according to marital and familial norms and demands. There is no threat to the institution of marriage, but precisely the opposite: this law recognizes and values marriage. [...] Aware that some people and institutions profoundly disagree with this legal change, I wish to say that like other reforms to the marriage code that preceded this one, this law will not generate bad results, that its only consequence will be to avoid senseless suffering of human beings. A society that avoids senseless suffering of its citizens is a better society. [...] In any case, I wish to express my deep respect to those people and institutions, and I also want to ask for the same respect for all of those who approve of this law. To the homosexuals that have personally tolerated the abuse and insults for many years, I ask that you add to the courage you have demonstrated in your struggle for civil rights, an example of generosity and joy with respect to all the beliefs.

A public protest against the law was held on June 19, 2005. Protesters—led by People's Party members, Spanish bishops and the Spanish Family Forum (Foro Español de la Familia)—said they had rallied 1.5 million people against what they considered "an attack on the traditional family and Spanish values"; the Government Delegation in Madrid counted 166,000 at the same event. Two weeks after this protest, coinciding with Pride Day, the National Federation of Lesbians, Gays, Transsexuals and Bisexuals (FELGT; Federación Estatal de Lesbianas, Gays, Transexuales y Bisexuales) estimated two million people marched in favour of the new law; police sources counted 97,000. Both marches took place in Madrid, at the time governed by the conservative People's Party.

Spanish Roman Catholic bishops also claimed that the government, by extending the right of marriage to same-sex couples, "weakened the meaning of marriage", which they defined as "the union of a heterosexual couple". The Spanish Family Forum expressed concern over the possibility of same-sex couples adopting and raising children, and argued that adoption is not a right for the parents, but for the adopted. LGBT associations replied that de facto adoption by same-sex couples had existed for a long time in Spain, since many couples were already rearing minors adopted by one of the partners. Joint adoption by same-sex couples was already legal in Navarre (2000), the Basque Country (2003), Aragon (2004), Catalonia (2005) and Cantabria (2005) before the same-sex marriage law legalized it nationwide. In addition, in Asturias (2002), Andalusia (2002) and Extremadura (2003), same-sex couples could jointly begin procedures to temporarily or permanently take children in care. These associations also argued that there was no scientific basis for the claim that the parents' sexual orientation would cause developmental problems for their adopted children. This view is officially supported by the Spanish Psychological Association (Consejo General de la Psicología de España), which also states that homosexuality is not a pathology.

During the 2011 general election, People's Party leader Mariano Rajoy said he preferred the term "civil union" to marriage for same-sex couples. In late 2017, the Socialist Workers' Party began calling for reforms to the Spanish Constitution to explicitly state the right of all couples, opposite-sex and same-sex, to marry. Currently, Article 32 of the Constitution notes the right of men and women to marry, but does not provide an explicit definition of marriage.

=== Court challenges ===
On July 21, 2005, a judge from the city of Dénia, Valencia refused to issue a marriage license to a lesbian couple. The judge filed a challenge against the same-sex marriage law with the Constitutional Court based on Article 163 of the Constitution, which allows judges to challenge constitutional changes. In August 2005, a judge from Gran Canaria refused licenses to three same-sex couples and mounted another constitutional challenge. In December 2005, the Constitutional Court rejected both challenges owing to both judges' lack of standing to file them. On September 30, 2005, the opposition People's Party decided to initiate a separate constitutional challenge, causing division within the party. The outcome was published on November 6, 2012, seven years after the challenge was presented. The court decided to uphold the same-sex marriage law with eight support votes and three against.

On February 27, 2007, the Spanish Family Forum presented an initiative signed by 1.5 million people to legislate marriage as "the union of a man and a woman" only, thus effectively prohibiting same-sex marriage. The initiative was rejected by the Congress of Deputies. On May 30, 2007, the aforementioned judge of Dénia was condemned by the Disciplinary Committee of the General Council of the Judiciary to pay €305 for refusing to marry the couple and was also strictly warned against doing it again. She attributed this action to government "propagandistic machinery".

=== Residency issues ===
Shortly after the law was passed, questions arose about the legal status of marriages to non-Spaniards, after a Spaniard and an Indian national living in Catalonia were denied a marriage license on the grounds that India did not permit same-sex marriage. However, on July 22, another judge in Catalonia married a Spanish woman and her Argentinian partner (the first same-sex marriage between women in Spain). This judge disagreed with his colleague's decision and gave preference to the right of marriage over Argentinian law, which at the time did not allow same-sex marriage. On July 27, the Prosecutors' Advisory Board (Junta de Fiscales de Sala)—a body within the Public Prosecutor's Office that advises the Ministry of Justice—issued an opinion that LGBT Spaniards can marry foreigners from countries that do not permit same-sex marriage. These marriages would be valid according to Spanish law, but did not imply automatic validity according to the foreigner's national law. A ruling published in the Boletín Oficial del Estado stated:

A marriage between a Spaniard and a foreigner, or between foreigners of the same sex resident in Spain, shall be valid as a result of applying Spanish material law, even if the foreigner's national legislation does not allow or recognize the validity of such marriages.

According to the instructions from the Ministry of Justice, Spanish consulates abroad may carry out the preliminary paperwork for a same-sex marriage. At least one of the marrying partners must be a Spanish citizen, residing in the consular demarcation. However, the marriage itself can only take place at the consulate if local laws recognize same-sex marriages. In all other cases, the partners must marry in Spanish territory. Two non-resident foreigners cannot marry in Spain, as at least one of the partners must be a Spanish resident, although they both may be non-Spanish citizens.

== Royal same-sex weddings ==
In October and November 2021, several European governments, including those of Belgium, Luxembourg, the Netherlands, Norway and Sweden, confirmed that members of their respective royal families may marry partners of the same sex without having to forfeit the crown, or lose their royal titles and privileges or their place in the line of succession. The Spanish Government has not commented on the matter. In August 2008, Doña Luisa Isabel Álvarez de Toledo, 21st Duchess of Medina Sidonia and three-time Grandee of Spain (branded the Red Duchess for her socialist activism) became the highest ranking Spanish noble to marry in an articulo mortis (deathbed) wedding to longtime companion Liliana Maria Dahlmann, now the Dowager Duchess of Medina Sidonia by right of her late wife.

In a 2008 biography, Queen Sofía of Spain revealed that she preferred the term "civil union" to "marriage" for committed same-sex relationships. This and other alleged comments by the Queen opened the Spanish monarchy to rare criticism in 2008, with the Zarzuela Palace issuing an apology on behalf of the Queen for the "inexact" quotes attributed to her. Antonio Poveda, the president of FELGT, said his organization accepted the Queen's apology, but added that there remains ill feelings by the LGBT community towards the Queen over the comments. King Juan Carlos, known to be far more liberal than his wife, was reportedly incensed by the biography, with reporters stating the King would fire palace officials who allegedly approved official royal endorsement of the book.

== Marriage statistics ==
According to the Spanish National Statistics Institute (INE), 82,637 same-sex marriages had taken place up to the end of 2024. Figures for 2020 are much lower than previous years because of the restrictions in place due to the COVID-19 pandemic.

In 2018, most same-sex marriages were performed in Catalonia at 987, followed by Madrid at 956, Andalusia at 774, Valencia at 589, the Canary Islands at 333, the Balearic Islands at 194, the Basque Country at 191, Murcia at 145, Castilla-La Mancha at 135, Galicia at 124, Castile and León at 92, Aragon at 68, Extremadura at 66, Asturias and Navarre at 50 each, Cantabria at 41, La Rioja at 24, Melilla at 7 and Ceuta at 2. Another 42 were performed abroad in Spanish consulates.

Number of marriages performed in Spain
Year	Same-sex marriages			Opposite-sex marriages	Total marriages	% same-sex
Year	Male	Female	Total	Opposite-sex marriages	Total marriages	% same-sex
2005 (Note: since July)	914	355	1,269	118,190	119,459	1.06%
2006	3,000	1,313	4,313	203,453	207,766	2.08%
2007	2,141	1,052	3,193	210,579	204,772	1.56%
2008	2,051	1,143	3,149	194,067	197,216	1.62%
2009	1,984	1,098	3,082	174,062	177,144	1.74%
2010	1,955	1,238	3,193	167,247	170,440	1.87%
2011	2,073	1,467	3,540	159,798	163,338	2.17%
2012	1,935	1,520	3,455	165,101	168,556	2.05%
2013	1,648	1,423	3,071	153,375	156,446	1.96%
2014	1,679	1,596	3,275	159,279	162,554	2.01%
2015	1,925	1,813	3,738	165,172	168,910	2.21%
2016	2,188	2,132	4,320	171,023	175,343	2.46%
2017	2,323	2,314	4,637	168,989	173,626	2.67%
2018	2,358	2,512	4,870	162,743	167,613	2.91%
2019	2,492	2,649	5,141	161,389	166,530	3.08%
2020	1,475	1,637	3,112	87,558	90,670	3.43%
2021	2,158	2,877	5,035	143,553	148,588	3.39%
2022	2,856	3,380	6,236	172,871	179,107	3.48%
2023	3,165	3,507	6,672	165,758	172,430	3.87%
2024	3,544	3,792	7,336	168,028	175,364	4.18%

== Notable weddings ==
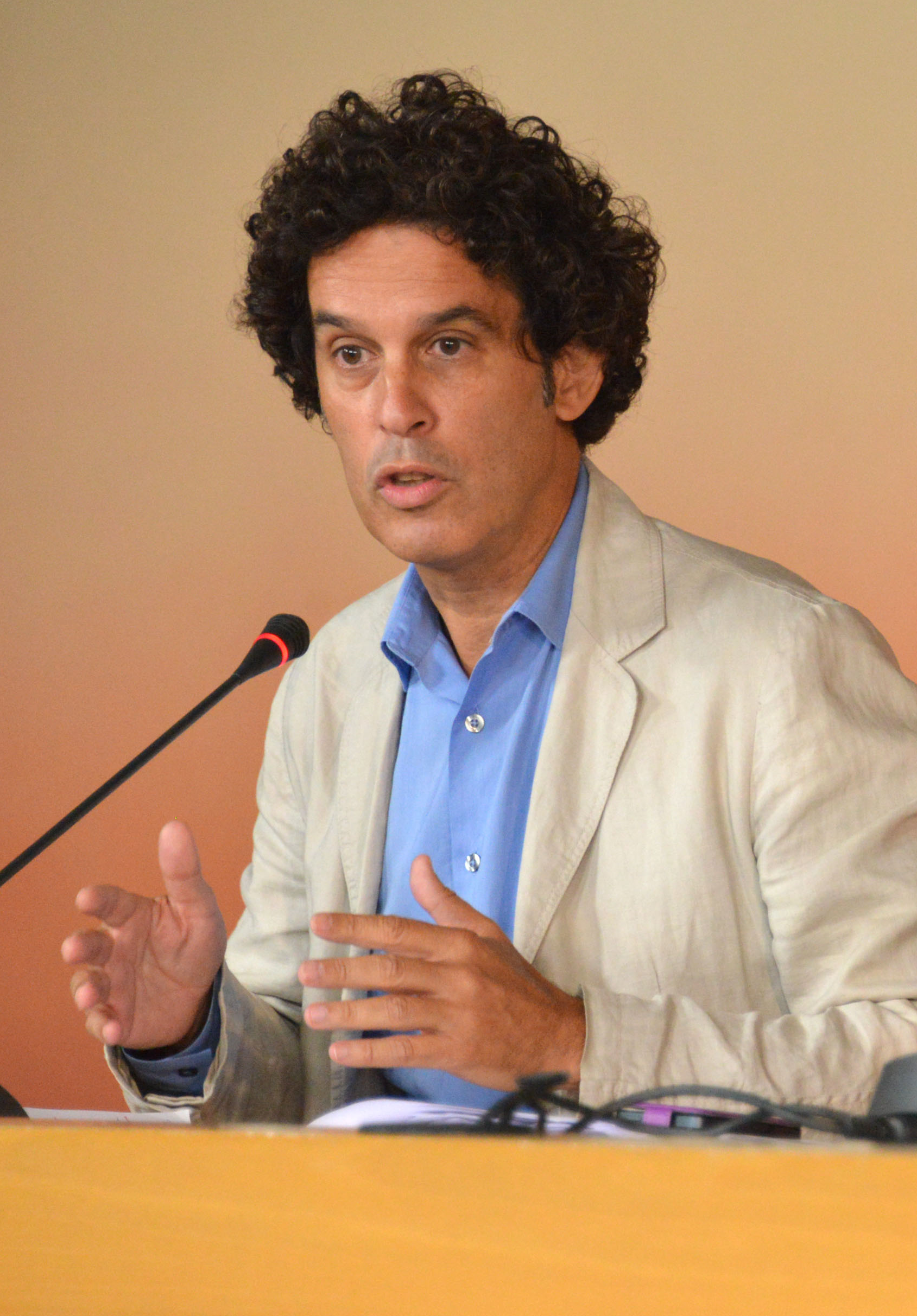
Politician Pedro Zerolo was one of the most important LGBT activists in the history of Spain and one of the biggest promoters of extending the right to marriage and adoption to same-sex couples in the country.

A same-sex marriage between two men, Pedro Díaz and Muño Vandilaz, occurred in Rairiz de Veiga on 16 April 1061. They were married by a priest at a small chapel. The historic documents about the church wedding were found at the Monastery of San Salvador de Celanova. Although not an official same-sex marriage, in 1901 Marcela Gracia Ibeas and Elisa Sanchez Loriga were married at the Igrexa de San Xurxo in A Coruña by Elisa secretly being re-baptized as a man.

Since its legalization in 2005, couples from across sections of Spanish society have entered into same-sex marriages. Within the first year the law received royal assent, Pedro Zerolo, an influential Socialist member of the Madrid City Council, married Jesús Santos in October, and popular television presenter Jesús Vázquez married Roberto Cortés in November. In October 2005, well-known judge Fernando Grande-Marlaska married his fiancé Gorka Gómez. In August 2006, Pepe Araujo, a People's Party city councilor in Ourense, married his fiancé Nino Crespo. In September 2006, Alberto Linero Marchena and Alberto Sánchez Fernández, both army soldiers assigned to the Morón Air Base near Seville, became Spain's first military personnel to marry under the new law. In June 2015, the Mayor of Vitoria-Gasteiz, Javier Maroto, a member of the conservative People's Party's national board, which initially opposed the legalization of same-sex marriage in Spain, announced his engagement to longtime partner Josema Rodríguez. The wedding was held on September 18, 2015 at Vitoria-Gasteiz City Hall, with Prime Minister Mariano Rajoy, who had challenged the law approving same-sex marriage when he was opposition leader, attending the wedding celebrations as a guest.

== Religious performance ==
Marriage in Spain may be contracted by religious or civil authorities. Religious marriages are recognised by the government and have the same status as civil marriages. Most major Christian denominations in Spain do not perform same-sex marriages in their places of worship. Some small Christian churches such as the Metropolitan Community Church perform blessings of same-sex marriages. The Spanish Evangelical Church (IEE) adopted a resolution in 2015 calling for the acceptance of same-sex unions. The move was widely criticised by the Federation of Evangelical Religious Entities of Spain (FEDERE), which chose to maintain the IEE as a member while also adopting a motion preventing any church supporting same-sex unions to be admitted as a member in the future. Despite not permitting its clergy to bless or officiate at same-sex marriages, the Spanish Reformed Episcopal Church issued a statement "reject[ing] the alleged right of [FEDERE] to interfere in the internal affairs of the different churches and communities that make it up".

The Catholic Church opposes same-sex marriage and does not allow its priests to officiate at such marriages. In December 2023, the Holy See published Fiducia supplicans, a declaration allowing Catholic priests to bless couples who are not considered to be married according to church teaching, including the blessing of same-sex couples. The Archbishop of Barcelona, Juan José Omella, said on 23 December that the declaration would require "a change of mentality for Europe, because it is difficult for us to understand this way of asking God for things that was not done before." The first blessing occurred at a church in Miajadas in May 2024. That same month, a same-sex couple held a civil marriage in a church in Talavera de la Reina. According to InfoVaticana, the Archdiocese of Toledo "[had] ceded [the church] to the City Council of Talavera de la Reina due to its deplorable state, so that the municipal government could use it for cultural activities". The marriage was officiated by a local PP councillor, but caused some controversy in Catholic circles.

== Public opinion ==
A poll by the government-run Centre for Sociological Investigations (Centro de Investigaciones Sociológicas), published in April 2005, reported that 66% of Spaniards favoured legalising same-sex marriage. Another poll taken by Instituto Opina a day before the bill passed placed support for the same-sex marriage bill at 62% and support of adoption by same-sex couples at 49%. An Instituto Opina poll taken nine months after the bill had passed showed that 61% agreed with the legalization. On July 25, 2007, the BBVA Foundation published their report "Social portrait of Spanish people" (Retrato social de los españoles), which showed that 60% of Spain's population supported same-sex marriage. This support occurred mainly among the younger population, between 15 and 34 years old (75%), people with higher education (71%), people not attached to any religion (75.5%), and those identified by left and centre-left political views (72%). However, only 44% of the population favored the right of adoption by same-sex couples, in contrast to 42% opposition.

A May 2013 Ipsos poll found that 76% of respondents were in favour of same-sex marriage and another 13% supported other forms of recognition for same-sex couples. According to an Ifop poll conducted that same month, 71% of Spaniards supported allowing same-sex couples to marry and adopt children.

The 2015 Eurobarometer found that 84% of Spaniards thought same-sex marriage should be allowed throughout Europe, while 10% were opposed. A Pew Research Center poll, conducted between April and August 2017 and published in May 2018, showed that 77% of Spaniards supported same-sex marriage, 13% were opposed and 10% did not know or refused to answer. When divided by religion, 90% of religiously unaffiliated people, 79% of non-practicing Christians and 59% of church-attending Christians supported same-sex marriage. Opposition was 7% among 18–34-year-olds.

The 2019 Eurobarometer found that 86% of Spaniards thought same-sex marriage should be allowed throughout Europe, while 9% were opposed. A Pew Research Center poll conducted between February and May 2023 showed that 87% of Spaniards supported same-sex marriage, 10% were opposed and 3% did not know or refused to answer. When divided by political affiliation, support was highest among those on the left of the political spectrum at 94%, followed by those at the center at 88% and those on the right at 82%. The 2023 Eurobarometer showed that support had increased to 88%, while 9% were opposed. The survey also found that 89% of Spaniards thought that "there is nothing wrong in a sexual relationship between two persons of the same sex", while 9% disagreed.

== See also ==
- First same-sex marriage in Spain
- LGBT rights by country
- LGBT rights in Spain
- Recognition of same-sex unions in Europe
