= 9th Congress of Deputies =

This is a list of members of Spain's ninth Congress of Deputies.

- José Luís Ábalos Meco (GS)
- María Rosario Fátima Aburto Baselga (GS)
- Ángel Jesús Acebes Paniagua (GP)
- María del Carmen Juana Achutegui Basagoiti (GS)
- Joseba Agirretxea Urresti (GV (EAJ-PNV))
- Ramón Aguirre Rodríguez (GP)
- Juan Manuel Albendea Pabón (GP)
- María Pilar Alegria Continente (GS)
- Jesús Alique López (GS)
- Higinio Almagro Castro (GS)
- Alfonso Alonso Aranegui (GP)
- Alejandro Alonso Núñez (GS)
- José Antonio Alonso (GS)
- Amador Álvarez Álvarez (GP)
- Cayetana Álvarez de Toledo Peralta Ramos (GP)
- Eloísa Álvarez Oteo (GS)
- Emilio Álvarez Villazán (GS)
- María del Carmen Álvarez-Arenas Cisneros (GP)
- Emilio Amuedo Moral (GS)
- Juan Carlos Aparicio Pérez (GP)
- Carlos Aragonés Mendiguchía (GP)
- Elviro Aranda Álvarez (GS)
- Miguel Arias Cañete (GP)
- Gustavo Manuel de Arístegui San Román (GP)
- María del Mar Arnaiz García (GS)
- Alfredo Francisco Javier Arola Blanquet (GS)
- Ignacio Astarloa Huarte-Mendicoa (GP)
- Andrés José Ayala Sánchez (GP)
- José Luis Ayllón Manso (GP)
- Pedro María Azpiazu Uriarte (GV (EAJ-PNV))
- José Eugenio Azpiroz Villar (GP)
- Alejandro Francisco Ballestero de Diego (GP)
- María Fátima Báñez García (GP)
- Inmaculada Bañuls Ros (GP)
- José Manuel Bar Cendón (GS)
- Uxue Barkos Berruezo (GMx)
- Miguel Barrachina Ros (GP)
- Juan Antonio Barranco Gallardo (GS)
- María Pilar Barreiro Álvarez (GP)
- Jaime Javier Barrero López (GS)
- Juan Antonio Barrio de Penagos (GS)
- Meritxell Batet Lamaña (GS)
- Soledad Becerril Bustamante (GP)
- José Ramón Beloki Guerra (GV (EAJ-PNV))
- José María Benegas Haddad (GS)
- José Antonio Bermúdez de Castro Fernández (GP)
- José Guillermo Bernabeu Pastor (GS)
- José Blanco López (GS)
- Rosa Delia Blanco Terán (GS)
- Fernando Boada González (GS)
- María Jesús Bonilla Domínguez (GP)
- Ferrán Bono Ara (GS)
- José Bono (GS)
- María Concepción Bravo Ibáñez (GP)
- Tomás Burgos Gallego (GP)
- José Alberto Cabañes Andrés (GS)
- Meritxell Cabezón Arbat (GS)
- Soledad Cabezón Ruiz (GS)
- Mercedes Cabrera Calvo-Sotelo (GS)
- Rosa Bella Cabrera Noda (GS)
- Joan Calabuig Rull (GS)
- Jesús Caldera Sánchez-Capitán (GS)
- Juan Callejón Baena (GS)
- Carmen Calvo Poyato (GS)
- Susana Camarero Benítez (GP)
- Belén María do Campo Piñeiro (GP)
- Herick Manuel Campos Arteseros (GS)
- Carles Campuzano i Canadés (GC-CiU)
- Francesc Canet Coma (GER-IU-ICV)
- Ana Cano Díaz (GS)
- Joan Canongia Gerona (GS)
- María Eugenia Carballedo Berlanga (GP)
- Francisco Xavier Carro Garrote (GS)
- Yolanda Casaus Rodríguez (GS)
- Helena Castellano Ramón (GS)
- María Virtudes Cediel Martínez (GS)
- Santiago Cervera Soto (GP)
- Ana María Chacón Carretero (GS)
- María Begoña Chacón Gutiérrez (GP)
- Carme Chacón Piqueras (GS)
- Ciprià Ciscar (GS)
- María Mercedes Coello Fernández-Trujillo (GS)
- María Montserrat Colldeforns i Sol (GS)
- Gerardo Jesús Conde Roa (GP)
- Juan Carlos Corcuera Plaza (GS)
- Lucila Corral Ruiz (GS)
- Miguel Ángel Cortés Martín (GP)
- Ignacio Cosidó Gutiérrez (GP)
- Juan Costa Climent (GP)
- María Angelina Costa Palacios (GS)
- Carlos Manuel Cotillas López (GP)
- Jesús Cuadrado Bausela (GS)
- Álvaro Cuesta Martínez (GS)
- Antonio Cuevas Delgado (GS)
- Teresa Cunillera i Mestres (GS)
- Celso Luis Delgado Arce (GP)
- Manuel Ceferino Díaz Díaz (GS)
- Clementina Díez de Baldeón García (GS)
- Rosa María Díez González (GMx)
- Manuel Domínguez González (GP)
- Sara Dueñas Herranz (GP)
- Josep Antoni Duran i Lleida (GC-CiU)
- Eva Durán Ramos (GP)
- José Ignacio Echániz Salgado (GP)
- María Remedios Elías Cordón (GS)
- Gabriel Elorriaga Pisarik (GP)
- Salvador de la Encina Ortega (GS)
- Antonio Erias Rey (GP)
- Josu Iñaki Erkoreka Gervasio (GV (EAJ-PNV))
- María Elena Espinosa Mangana (GS)
- Aitor Esteban Bravo (GV (EAJ-PNV))
- Esperança Esteve Ortega (GS)
- Marta Estrada Ibars (GS)
- Andrea Fabra Fernández (GP)
- Enrique Fajarnés Ribas (GP)
- María José Fernández Aguerri (GS)
- Mariano Fernández Bermejo (GS)
- María Olaia Fernández Davila (GMx)
- María Teresa Fernández de la Vega Sanz (GS)
- Arsenio Fernández de Mesa Díaz del Río (GP)
- Jorge Fernández Díaz (GP)
- Daniel Fernández González (GS)
- Juli Fernández i Iruela (GS)
- Francisco Miguel Fernández Marugán (GS)
- María del Pilar Fernández Pardo (GP)
- Isidro Fernández Rozada (GP)
- Blanca Fernández-Capel Baños (GP)
- María Amparo Ferrando Sendra (GP)
- Anton Ferré Fons (GS)
- Vicente Ferrer Roselló (GP)
- Alberto Fidalgo Francisco (GS)
- Carlos Javier Floriano Corrales (GP)
- Ana María Fuentes Pacheco (GS)
- Mariano Gallego Barrero (GP)
- Antonio Gallego Burgos (GP)
- María de las Mercedes Gámez García (GS)
- Joaquín María García Díez (GP)
- Sara García Ruiz (GS)
- Teresa García Sena (GP)
- Antonia García Valls (GS)
- Jaime García-Legaz Ponce (GP)
- Arturo García-Tizón López (GP)
- Alberto Garre López (GP)
- Marta Gastón Menal (GS)
- Ignacio Gil Lázaro (GP)
- Javier Gómez Darmendrail (GP)
- Luis Antonio Gómez Piña (GS)
- María Gloria Gómez Santamaría (GS)
- Juan Antonio Gómez Trinidad (GP)
- Sixto González García (GP)
- Ángel Luis González Muñoz (GP)
- Francisco Antonio González Pérez (GP)
- Esteban González Pons (GP)
- Adolfo Luis González Rodríguez (GP)
- Miguel González Rodríguez (GS)
- Pilar González Segura (GP)
- Carlos González Serna (GS)
- Sebastián González Vázquez (GP)
- Pilar Grande Pesquero (GS)
- Juan Carlos Grau Reinés (GP)
- Inmaculada Guaita Vañó (GP)
- Alfonso Guerra González (GS)
- María del Carmen Guerra Guerra (GP)
- Vicente Guillén Izquierdo (GS)
- Antonio Gutiérrez Molina (GP)
- Antonio Gutiérrez Vegara (GS)
- Miguel Ángel Heredia Díaz (GS)
- Carmen Hermosín Bono (GS)
- Rafael Antonio Hernando Fraile (GP)
- Antonio Hernando Vera (GS)
- Rafael Herrera Gil (GS)
- Joan Herrera Torres (GER-IU-ICV)
- María Olga Iglesias Fontal (GP)
- Jordi Jané i Guasch (GC-CiU)
- Francisco Xesús Jorquera Caselas (GMx)
- Carmen Juanes Barciela (GS)
- Juan Carlos Lagares Flores (GP)
- José Ignacio Landaluce Calleja (GP)
- Santiago Lanzuela Marina (GP)
- María Teresa de Lara Carbó (GP)
- Fèlix Larrosa Piqué (GS)
- José Javier Lasarte Iribarren (GS)
- José María Lassalle Ruiz (GP)
- María Luisa Lizarraga Gisbert (GS)
- Gaspar Llamazares Trigo (GER-IU-ICV)
- José Ignacio Llorens Torres (GP)
- Óscar López Águeda (GS)
- Isabel López i Chamosa (GS)
- Carlos Roberto López Riesco (GP)
- María Pilar López Rodríguez (GS)
- Carmelo López Villena (GS)
- Fernando López-Amor García (GP)
- César Luena López (GS)
- Teófilo de Luis Rodríguez (GP)
- Pere Macias Arau (GC-CiU)
- José Madero Jarabo (GP)
- Eduardo Madina Muñoz (GS)
- Ana María Madrazo Díaz (GP)
- Luis Maldonado Fernández de Tejada (GP)
- María Arritokieta Marañón Basarte (GS)
- Guillermo Mariscal Anaya (GP)
- José Javier Mármol Peñalver (GS)
- Carmen Marón Beltrán (GS)
- María Guadalupe Martín González (GS)
- Pablo Martín Peré (GS)
- Cándida Martínez López (GS)
- Teófila Martínez Saiz (GP)
- José Joaquín Martínez Sieso (GP)
- Juan de Dios Martínez Soriano (GP)
- Vicente Martínez-Pujalte López (GP)
- Manuel Mas i Estela (GS)
- Juan José Matarí Sáez (GP)
- Ana Mato Adrover (GP)
- Pablo Matos Mascareño (GP)
- Francisca Medina Teva (GS)
- Jesús Membrado Giner (GS)
- Daniel Méndez Guillén (GS)
- Lourdes Méndez Monasterio (GP)
- María Antonia Mercant Nadal (GP)
- Rafael Merino López (GP)
- Mario Mingo Zapatero (GP)
- María Sandra Moneo Díez (GP)
- Josu Montalbán Goicoechea (GS)
- María Virtudes Monteserín Rodríguez (GS)
- Macarena Montesinos de Miguel (GP)
- Carmen Montón Giménez (GS)
- Cristóbal Ricardo Montoro Romero (GP)
- Dolors Montserrat (GP)
- Jorge Moragas Sánchez (GP)
- Sixte Moral Reixach (GS)
- Fernando Moraleda Quílez (GS)
- Hugo Alfonso Morán Fernández (GS)
- Juan Morano Masa (GP)
- Miguel Ángel Moratinos Cuyaubé (GS)
- Juan Manuel Moreno Bonilla (GP)
- Ramón Moreno Bustos (GP)
- Diego Moreno Castrillo (GS)
- Juan Moscoso del Prado Hernández (GS)
- José Vicente Muñoz Gómez (GS)
- Pedro José Muñoz González (GS)
- Miriam Muñoz Resta (GS)
- María Gràcia Muñoz Salvà (GS)
- Lourdes Muñoz Santamaría (GS)
- Francisco Vicente Murcia Barceló (GP)
- Álvaro María Nadal Belda (GP)
- Dolors Nadal i Aymerich (GP)
- Eugenio Nasarre Goicoechea (GP)
- Carmen Navarro Cruz (GP)
- Emilio Olabarría Muñoz (GV (EAJ-PNV))
- Ana María Oramas González-Moro (GMx)
- José Oria Galloso (GS)
- Arsenio Pacheco Atienza (GP)
- Montserrat Palma i Muñoz (GS)
- Ana María Pastor Julián (GP)
- Jordi Pedret i Grenzner (GS)
- María Adelaida Pedrosa Roldán (GP)
- Miguel Ignacio Peralta Viñes (GP)
- José Luis Perestelo Rodríguez (GMx)
- Jesús Pérez Arca (GP)
- Manuel Pérez Castell (GS)
- María Soledad Pérez Domínguez (GS)
- Margarita Pérez Herraiz (GS)
- Daniel Pérez Morales (GS)
- Alfredo Pérez Rubalcaba (GS)
- José Antonio Pérez Tapias (GS)
- Manuel Pezzi Cereto (GS)
- Mª Mercè Pigem Palmés (GC-CiU)
- Ángel Pintado Barbanoj (GP)
- José María Ponce Anguita (GP)
- Jesús María Posada Moreno (GP)
- María Isabel Pozuelo Meño (GS)
- Gabino Puche Rodríguez-Acosta (GP)
- María Dolores Puig Gasol (GS)
- Jesús Quijano González (GS)
- María del Carmen Quintanilla Barba (GP)
- Sebastián Quirós Pulgar (GS)
- Mariano Rajoy Brey (GP)
- María Pilar Ramallo Vázquez (GP)
- Alejandro Ramírez del Molino Morán (GP)
- Juan Luis Rascón Ortega (GS)
- Jaime Reinares Fernández (GP)
- Francisco Reyes Martínez (GS)
- Francesc Ricomá de Castellarnau (GP)
- Joan Ridao i Martín (GER-IU-ICV)
- Inmaculada Riera i Reñé (GC-CiU)
- Gloria Elena Rivero Alcover (GS)
- Gonzalo Robles Orozco (GP)
- Manuel de la Rocha Rubí (GS)
- Mª Teresa Rodríguez Barahona (GS)
- María del Carmen Rodríguez Maniega (GP)
- José Luis Rodríguez Zapatero (GS)
- Rafael Rodriguez-Ponga y Salamanca (GP)
- Beatriz Rodríguez-Salmones Cabeza (GP)
- Rafael Román Guerrero (GS)
- Aurelio Romero Girón (GP)
- Susana Ros Martínez (GS)
- Luisa Fernanda Rudi Úbeda (GP)
- Joan Ruiz i Carbonell (GS)
- Román Ruiz Llamas (GS)
- María Soraya Sáenz de Santamaría Antón (GP)
- Àlex Sáez Jubero (GS)
- Luis Carlos Sahuquillo García (GS)
- Elena Salgado Méndez (GS)
- María Salom Coll (GP)
- Carlos Casimiro Salvador Armendáriz (GMx)
- María Carmen Sánchez Díaz (GS)
- Celinda Sánchez García (GP)
- Josep Sánchez i Llibre (GC-CiU)
- Pedro Sánchez Pérez-Castejón (GS)
- Aurelio Sánchez Ramos (GP)
- María de la Concepción de Santa Ana Fernández (GP)
- Josep Antoni Santamaría i Mateo (GS)
- Concepción Sanz Carrillo (GS)
- Óscar Seco Revilla (GS)
- José Segura Clavell (GS)
- Mª Enriqueta Seller Roca de Togores (GP)
- Juana Serna Masiá (GS)
- Rafael Simancas Simancas (GS)
- María José Solana Barras (GP)
- Roberto Soravilla Fernández (GP)
- Federico Souvirón García (GP)
- Celestino Suárez González (GS)
- Montserrat Surroca i Comas (GC-CiU)
- Domingo Miguel Tabuyo Romero (GS)
- Joan Tardà i Coma (GER-IU-ICV)
- Ricardo Tarno Blanco (GP)
- María Concepció Tarruella Tomàs (GC-CiU)
- Luis Juan Tomás García (GS)
- Baudilio Tomé Muguruza (GP)
- Ana Torme Pardo (GP)
- Marta Torrado de Castro (GP)
- José Andrés Torres Mora (GS)
- Ángel Víctor Torres Pérez (GS)
- Vicenta Tortosa Urrea (GS)
- Federico Trillo-Figueroa Martínez-Conde (GP)
- Carlos Trujillo Garzón (GS)
- María Antonia Trujillo (GS)
- Luis Tudanca Fernández (GS)
- Ignacio Uriarte Ayala (GP)
- María Elena Valenciano Martínez-Orozco (GS)
- Francesc Vallès Vives (GS)
- Francisco Vañó Ferre (GP)
- Ana Belén Vázquez Blanco (GP)
- Antonio Vázquez Jiménez (GP)
- María José Vázquez Morillo (GS)
- Juan Carlos Vera Pro (GP)
- María Teresa Villagrasa Pérez (GS)
- Celia Villalobos (GP)
- Francisco José Villar García-Moreno (GP)
- Julio Villarrubia Mediavilla (GS)
- Jordi Xuclà i Costa (GC-CiU)
