= Calomarde =

Calomarde may refer to:

- Francisco Tadeo Calomarde, 1st Duke of Santa Isabel (1773–1842), Spanish statesman
- Joaquín Calomarde (1956–2019), Spanish politician
- Calomarde, Aragon, a place in Spain
