= José Acosta =

José Acosta may refer to:

- José Acosta (baseball) (1891–1977), Cuban baseball player
- José Acosta Cubero (born 1947), Spanish politician
- José de Acosta (1540–1600), Jesuit naturalist and missionary in Latin America
- José Eugenio Acosta (1942–2006), Argentine equestrian
- José Julián Acosta (1825–1891), journalist and advocate of the abolition of slavery in Puerto Rico
