= Azpiazu =

Azpiazu or Azpiazú is a surname. Notable people with the surname include:

- Don Azpiazú (1893–1943), Cuban orchestral director
- Pedro María Azpiazu (born 1957), Spanish Basque politician
