= Inmaculada Guaita Vañó =

Spanish politician (born 1965)

Inmaculada Guaita Vañó (Picassent, Spain, 22 March 1965) is a Spanish politician who belongs to the People's Party (PP).

Married, with three children, Guaita joined the PP's predecessors, the People's Alliance, in 1983. She later became head of the Picassent branch of the PP and was elected to Picassent council in 1999.

For the 2008 General Election she was placed eleventh on the PP list for Valencia Province, a district where the PP had only won seven seats at the previous election. However a PP gain, and the resignation of three PP members of Congress, meant that she joined the Congress in August 2009 as a substitute for José María Michavila who had resigned citing "personal and family reasons." In Congress she has served on the Justice Commission.
