= Ana Cano Díaz =

Spanish politician (1965–2024)

Member of the Congress of Deputies for Almería
- In office 29 April 2008 – 27 September 2011

Personal details
- Born: 19 October 1965 Pulpí, Spain
- Died: 9 October 2024 (aged 58) Huércal-Overa, Spain
- Party: PSOE

Ana Cano Díaz (19 October 1965 – 9 October 2024) was a Spanish politician. A member of the Spanish Socialist Workers' Party, she served in the Congress of Deputies from 2008 to 2011.

Cano died in Huércal-Overa on 9 October 2024, at the age of 58.
