= Inmaculada Bañuls =

Spanish politician (born 1963)

Inmaculada Bañuls Ros (born 6 May 1963) is a Spanish teacher and politician who belongs to the main opposition People's Party (PP).

Bañuls was born in Gandía, Spain. She gained a diploma in religious sciences and passed courses in teaching and special education. She is married with two daughters. Her political career began in 2003 when she was elected as a PP councillor in Gandia. In March 2008, she was elected to the Spanish Congress of Deputies representing Valencia region. In one of her first votes in the chamber, she mistakenly voted for the Spanish Socialist Workers' Party (PSOE) candidate for Prime Minister, José Luis Rodríguez Zapatero, a mistake that was subsequently corrected.
