= Andrea Fabra =

Spanish politician

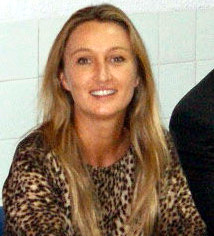

MP in the Spanish Cortes Generales
- Incumbent
- Assumed office 9 March 2008

Designated Spanish Senator
- In office 2004–2008

Personal details
- Born: Andrea Fabra Fernández; 29 May 1973 (age 53) Castellón, Spain
- Party: People's Party
- Education: Complutense University of Madrid
- Occupation: Lawyer

Andrea Fabra Fernández (born 29 May 1973 in Castellón de la Plana) is a Spanish politician. Heir to a long dynasty of heads of the Valencia provincial government, she is the daughter of Carlos Fabra Carreras, former provincial head of the People's Party (PP) of Spain and currently serving a 4 years jail sentence for tax fraud. She is married to Juan José Güemes, a PP politician in the Madrid region. She is currently an MP for the PP in the Spanish parliament, representing Castellón Province.

== Controversy ==
In 2007, her banking accounts and patrimony were investigated, but the case was eventually dismissed.

Whilst Mariano Rajoy, prime minister of Spain, announced cuts to the unemployment benefits in July 2012, she exclaimed (in agreement) 'Que se jodan', literally 'Fuck them'. Her actions caused huge controversy in Spain and a petition was signed by almost 200,000 people calling for her resignation. While she released an official apology for the outburst, it's earned her the nickname in popular social media of Andrea "que-se-jodan" Fabra or literally, Andrea "fuck them" Fabra. Also, it inadvertently provided a rallying cry for anti-austerity protestors in Spain.
