= Juan Carlos Guerra Zunzunegui =

Spanish lawyer and politician (1935–2020)

Juan Carlos Guerra Zunzunegui (1 February 1935 – 28 September 2020) was a Spanish lawyer and politician who served as a Senator and Deputy.
