= Dolores García-Hierro =

Spanish politician

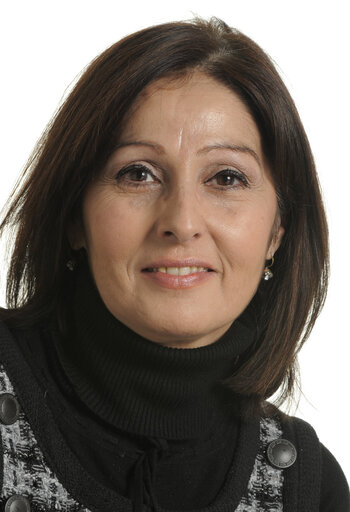

Member of the European Parliament
- In office 1 December 2011 – 30 July 2014
- Constituency: Spain

Personal details
- Born: 16 May 1958 (age 67) Urda, Toledo, Spain
- Party: Spanish Socialist Workers Party
- Occupation: Politician

Dolores "Lola" García-Hierro Caraballo is a Spanish politician. From 2011 to 2014, she served as a Member of the European Parliament, representing Spain for the Spanish Socialist Workers Party. She was also city councillor of Madrid, member of the Congress of Deputies as well as member of the Assembly of Madrid, and senator.
