= Verónica Lope Fontagne =

Spanish politician

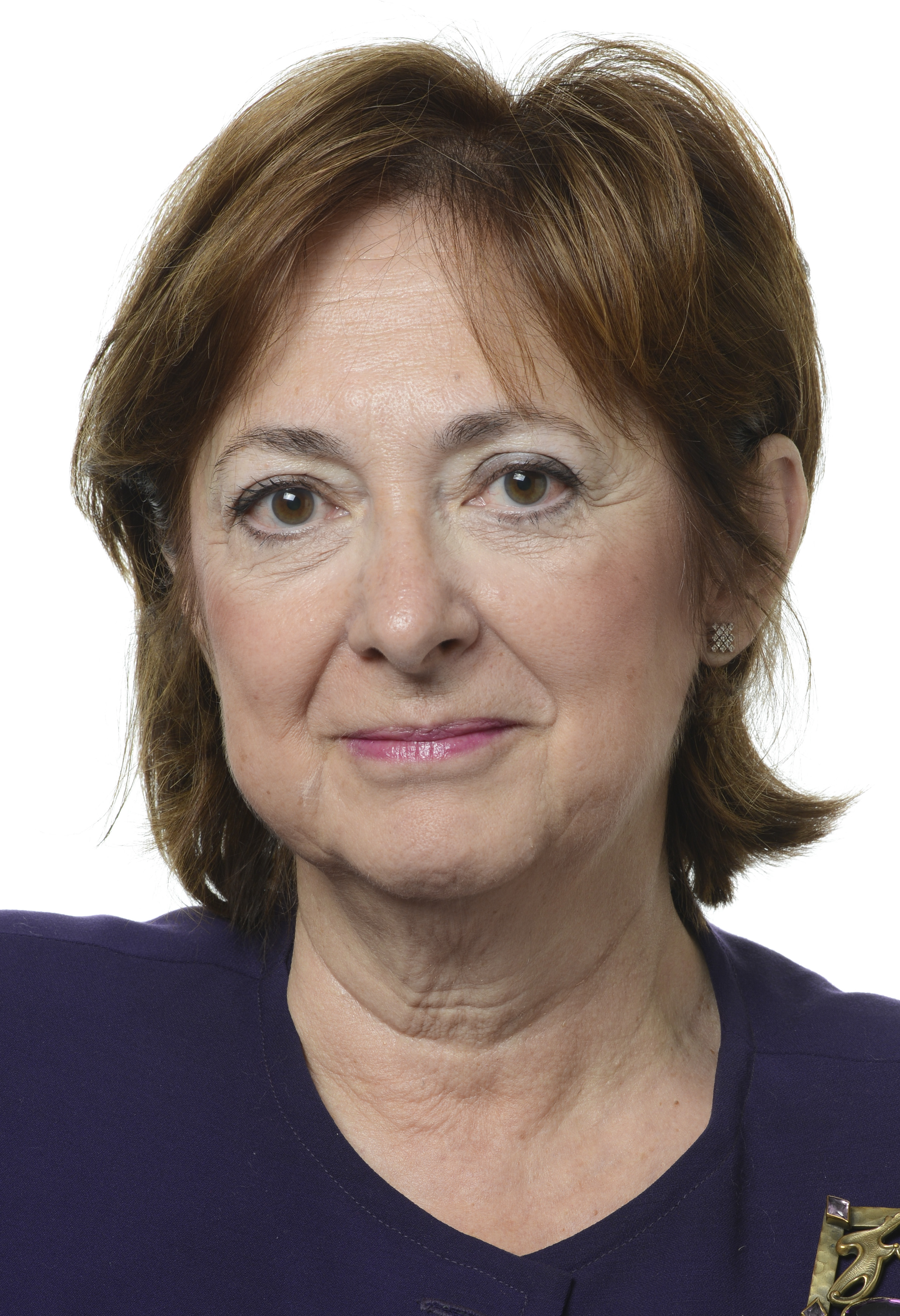

Member of the European Parliament
- In office 2009–2019

Personal details
- Born: 1 February 1952 (age 74) Bordeaux, France

Verónica Lope Fontagne (born 1 February 1952) is a Spanish politician from the People's Party who served as a Member of the European Parliament from 2009 to 2019.
