= Alfonso Perales =

Spanish historian and politician

Alfonso Perales Pizarro (19 July 1954, in Alcalá de los Gazules – 23 December 2006, in Conil de la Frontera) was a Spanish historian and politician.

== Biography ==
Graduated in History, he was a professor at the University of Cadiz. In political life, he joined the Spanish Socialist Workers' Party during his time in 1972.

He was a member of the management of the Socialist Youth, Secretary General of the PSOE in Cadiz, Secretary of Organization of the PSOE in Andalusia and Secretary of Municipal Policy and Secretary of Institutional and Autonomous Relations in the Federal Executive Committee of the PSOE.

Alfonso Perales was at the historic Suresnes Congress in 1974, and over time he helped rebuild the structure of the PSOE, first in Cadiz and then in Andalusia. Endowed with an extraordinary capacity for irony and sense of humour, he practised politics from the principles of loyalty to institutions and the search for agreement and consensus.

His last great contribution to the PSOE and to Spanish politics was the negotiation in the Congress of Deputies of the reform of the Statute of Andalusia with the rest of the political forces, his assistance being fundamental so that the reform of the Andalusian Statute, which had not been voted on by the PP in Andalusia, could achieve a broad consensus in the Spanish Parliament.

In the institutional field, he was elected councillor in the City Council of Cadiz and between 1983 and 1987 President of the Provincial Council of Cadiz. From 1989 to 1996, he obtained the act of deputy to the Congress, and later he joined the Andalusian Government as Minister of Governance. He returned as a member of Congress in 2004.

After the general elections of 2004, he coordinated the political position of the PSOE in the reforms of the Statutes of Autonomy of the Valencian Community, Catalonia and Andalusia. Upon his death, he was replaced as Secretary of Institutional Policy by Carmen Hermosín.
