= Rogelio Baón =

Spanish journalist, lawyer and politician (1942–2008)

Member of the Parliament
- In office 1989–2008
- Constituency: Toledo; Madrid

Personal details
- Born: Rogelio Baón Ramírez; 23 February 1942 Quintanar de la Orden, Spain
- Died: 26 February 2008 (aged 66) Madrid, Spain
- Resting place: Valdemorillo, Spain
- Party: People's Party
- Children: 2
- Education: Complutense University of Madrid
- Profession: Journalist; Lawyer

Rogelio Baón Ramírez (1942–2008) was a Spanish journalist, lawyer and politician. He served at the Parliament for People's Party for five terms between 1989 and 2008.

== Early life and education ==
Baón was born in Quintanar de la Orden on 23 February 1942. He received a degree in journalism in 1967. Then he graduated from the Complutense University of Madrid obtaining a law degree. His speciality was commercial and tax law.

== Career and activities ==
Baón was the editor of La Gaceta del Norte, a Bilbao-based newspaper, between 1965 and 1967. He joined the EFE agency in 1967 and worked in its Lisbon and Guinea branches. He began to work in the Radio Nacional de España in February 1971 and held various posts. He worked as a lawyer from 1976 and also, became a faculty member at his alma mater, Complutense University of Madrid. He held several posts in the Radio Nacional de España and in the RTVE until 1989. In the latter he headed the joint commission.

Baón joined the People's Party and became a deputy for the party representing Toledo in the 1989 general election. He was reelected to the Parliament in the 1993 general election from Madrid. He also won his seat in the 1996 general election, 2000 general election and 2004 general election.

Baón became the chair of the Memory of the Transition unit at the European University of Madrid in 2006. He was the first head of the unit.

Baón was the author of several books most of which are about history and political science.

== Personal life and death ==
Baón was married and had two children.

Baón died in Madrid at the age of 66 on 26 February 2008. He was buried in Valdemorillo on 28 February.
