= Alejandro Ballestero =

Spanish politician (born 1969)

Alejandro Francisco Ballestero de Diego (Madrid, Spain, 4 October 1969) is a Spanish politician who belongs to the People's Party (PP).

Single, Ballestero qualified as a lawyer. In 1993 he began to work for the regional administration of his home region of Castilla-La Mancha and in 1995 worked as a technical adviser to the PP group in the parliament of Castilla- La Mancha. He resigned after one year when he was elected to the Spanish Congress of Deputies representing Toledo Province. He was re-elected in 2000, 2004 and 2008, but did not stand at the 2011 election.
