= Josep Sánchez i Llibre =

Spanish politician

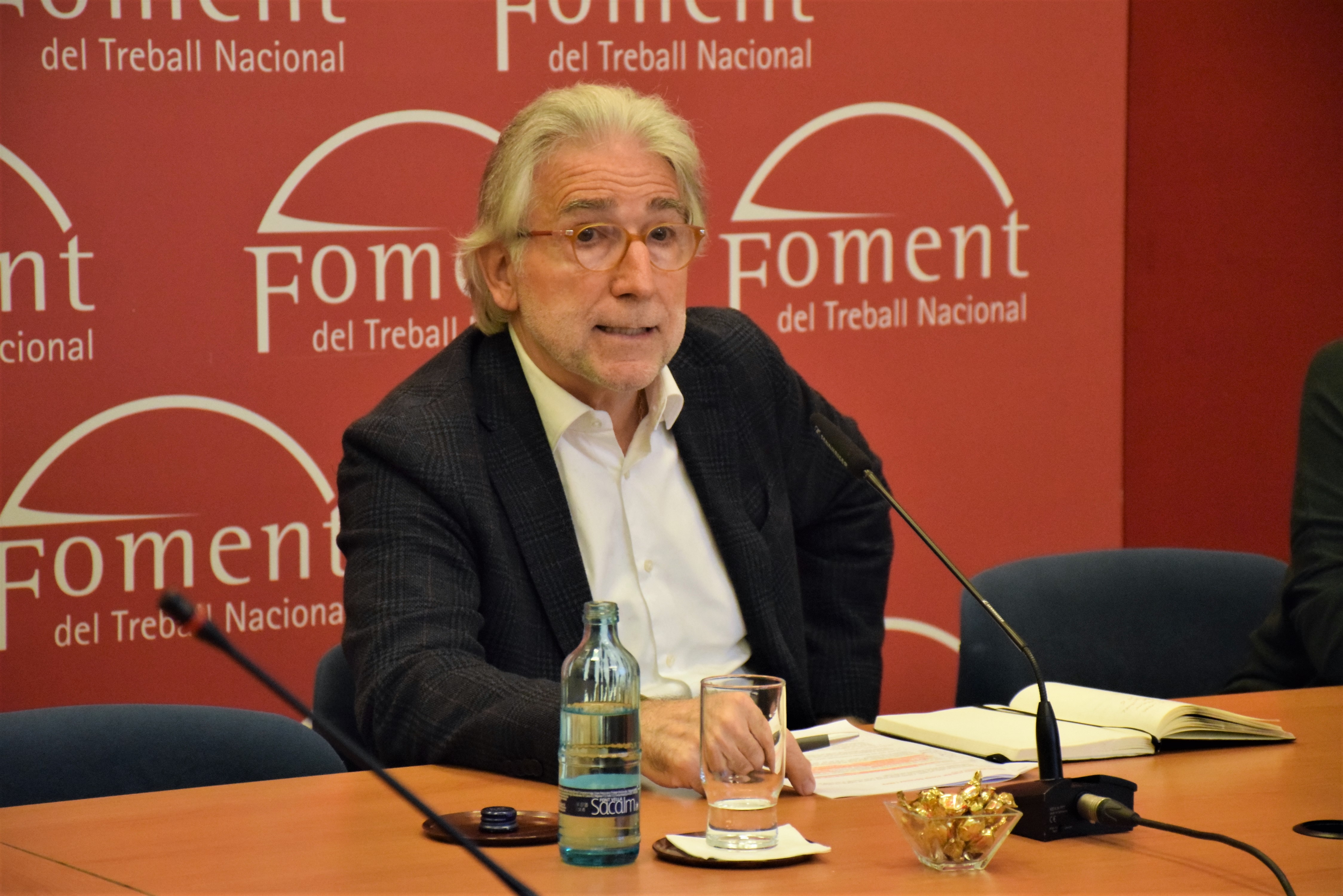
- Born: 26 May 1949; Vilassar de Mar
- Alma mater: Esade
- Occupation: Politician, economist
- Political party: Democratic Union of Catalonia, United to Advance
- Position held: Member of the Congress of Deputies (1993–1996), Member of the Congress of Deputies (1996–2000), Member of the Congress of Deputies (2000–2004), Member of the Congress of Deputies (2004–2008), Member of the Congress of Deputies (2008–2011), Member of the Congress of Deputies (2011–2016)

Josep Sánchez i Llibre (Vilassar de Mar, Spain 26 May 1949) is a Spanish politician who represented the Democratic Union of Catalonia in Spain. He represented the Barcelona Province in the Spanish Congress of Deputies from 1996 until 2015, and was also a member of the Parliament of Catalonia and Senate of Spain.

Since 2018, he has been the president of the Promotion of National Work, a Catalan employers' association.
