= Juan Manuel Albendea Pabón =

Spanish politician, lawyer, and economist (1937–2022)

- Born: June 8, 1937; Cabra, Spain
- Died: January 2, 2022 (aged 84)
- Occupation(s): politician, lawyer and economist

Juan Manuel Albendea Pabón (Cabra, Spain, 8 June 1937 – 2 January 2022) was a Spanish politician, lawyer and economist.

He was a member of the Spanish People's Party (PP). He was first elected to represent Seville in the Spanish Congress in 1996, and was re-elected in 2000, 2004 and 2008.

He qualified as a lawyer and became involved in business and economic law and the Direction of Companies. He became a high executive in the financial sector and a member of the Regional Executive Committee of Andalusia. Albendea Pabón was also Second Vice-president of the Commission of Justice, and contributed to the Commission of Economy and Property, Public Administrations, and Communication.

Albendea Pabon was married and had seven children. He died on 2 January 2022, at the age of 84.
