= José Acosta Cubero =

Spanish politician (born 1947)

Personal details
- Born: 24 May 1947 Cercedilla, Spain
- Died: 18 July 2025 (aged 78) Collado Villalba, Spain
- Party: Socialist Workers Party of Spain
- Occupation: Politician

José Acosta Cubero (24 May 1947 – 18 July 2025) was a Spanish Socialist politician who served in the Congress of Deputies, representing Madrid Province for the first to eighth legislatures.
