= Amador Álvarez =

Spanish politician

Amador Álvarez (born 24 February 1945 in Carrascalejo (Cáceres), Spain) is a Spanish politician.

Married with five children, he gained a doctorate in law and worked as a notary. He is a spokesman of the Partido Popular. He has served as mayor of Carrascalejo since 1979. In 1993, he was elected to the national parliament, the Congress of Deputies for Cáceres district and was re-elected at the subsequent elections in 1996, 2000, 2004 and 2008.
