= Javier Gómez Darmendrail =

Spanish politician (born 1949)

Javier Gómez Darmendrail (Madrid, Spain 7 March 1949) is a Spanish politician who belongs to the People's Party (PP).

Married with three children, Gómez graduated in French philology and later worked as a teacher.

Gómez began his political career in 1989 when he was elected to the Spanish Congress of Deputies representing Segovia Province and has been re-elected at each subsequent general election.

In Congress, he has been a member of the sub-committees on Defence, Education and Culture, Industry, Energy and Tourism and Infrastructure. After serving in the Executive Committee of the PP in Segovia Province, he was selected as a member of the national executive of the PP in October 2007 In the past Gómez has also served as a member of the Parliamentary Assembly of NATO.
