= Lourdes Muñoz Santamaría =

Spanish politician, engineer, and open data specialist (born 1969)

Lourdes Muñoz
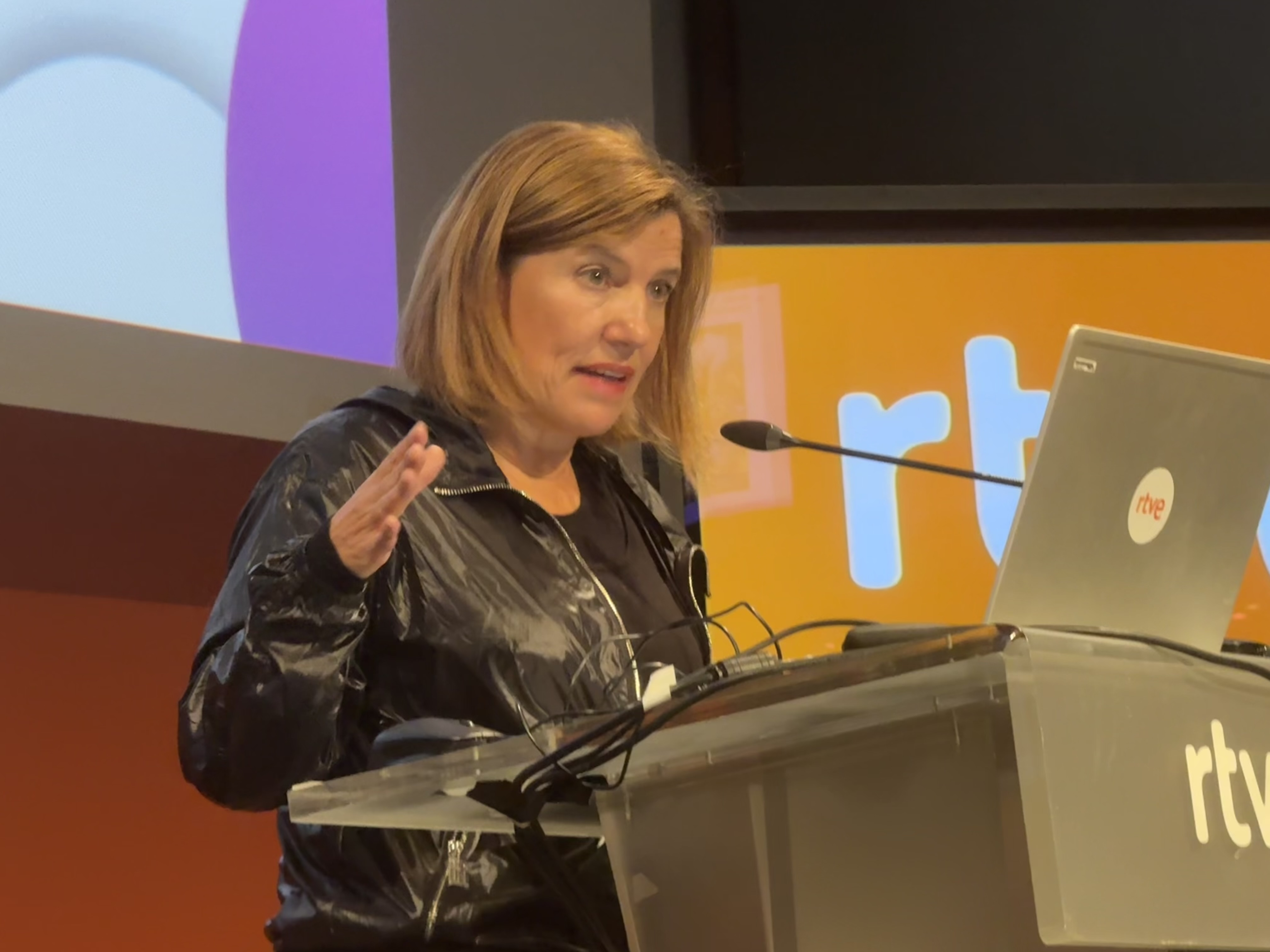
- Lourdes Muñoz in 2023

Member of the Congress of Deputies
- In office November 2002 – November 2011
- Constituency: Barcelona

Member of the Congress of Deputies
- In office June 2014 – 2015
- Constituency: Barcelona

Personal details
- Born: Lourdes Muñoz Santamaría; December 15, 1969 (age 56) Barcelona, Spain
- Party: Socialists' Party of Catalonia (PSC)
- Education: Universitat Politècnica de Catalunya; Universitat Oberta de Catalunya
- Occupation: Engineer; politician; open data specialist

Lourdes Muñoz Santamaría (born 15 December 1969) is a Spanish computer engineer, socialist politician, and open data specialist. She served as a member of the Congress of Deputies representing the province of Barcelona, where she focused on information society policy, free software advocacy, and gender equality.

== Early life and education ==
Muñoz was born in Barcelona on 15 December 1969. She studied computer engineering at the Universitat Politècnica de Catalunya (UPC), graduating with a degree in management computing (Ingeniería Técnica de Informática de Gestión). She later completed a master's degree in Information Society and Knowledge at the Universitat Oberta de Catalunya (UOC) in 2010–2011.

While studying engineering, Muñoz simultaneously created her own company, Lúdico Cultura Barcelona, providing educational and entertainment services for children, which she ran from 1993 to 1997. She began her political activism early, joining the Young Socialists of Catalonia (JSC) in 1984 at the age of 15, and the Socialists' Party of Catalonia (PSC) in 1989.

== Political career ==
=== Local politics in Barcelona ===
Muñoz began her political career at the municipal level as a district councillor in Les Corts, Barcelona, in 1991. She became the First Secretary of PSC-Les Corts in 1993 and a member of the PSC National Council that same year. In 2000, she was appointed Secretary of Women's Policies on the PSC National Executive, a position she held until 2008.

From 2001 to 2003, she served as Councillor for Women (Regidora de la Dona) on Barcelona City Council, where she promoted the creation of municipal services to combat gender-based violence and initiatives to encourage women's adoption of new technologies.

=== Congress of Deputies (2002–2011) ===
Muñoz entered the Congress of Deputies in November 2002, representing the province of Barcelona for the PSC. She served continuously until November 2011, spanning the VII, VIII, and IX legislatures.

During her parliamentary career, she served as the Socialist spokesperson on the Commission for Industry, Tourism, and Commerce, where she focused on technology policy and the development of the information society. She was a notable advocate for free and open-source software in Spanish public administration, successfully urging the government to promote its use.

Muñoz was also a member of the Mixed Commission for Women's Rights and Equal Opportunities. She participated in the parliamentary subcommittee (ponencia) on the situation of prostitution in Spain, which produced a report approved in 2007 after three years of deliberation.

=== PSC organization and return to Congress (2012–2015) ===
In February 2012, Muñoz assumed the Secretariat of Organization of PSC Barcelona, where she promoted the "Partido Abierto" (Open Party) project focused on transparency and citizen participation. She also coordinated the commission that organized the open primaries in which Jaume Collboni was selected as the PSC candidate for Mayor of Barcelona for the 2015 municipal elections.

In June 2014, Muñoz returned to the Congress of Deputies during the X Legislature, filling the seat vacated by Albert Soler, who had left to become Director of Institutional Sporting Relations at FC Barcelona.

== Pioneering political blogging ==
Muñoz was a pioneer in the Spanish political blogosphere. In September 2005, while on holiday in New Orleans, she was caught in Hurricane Katrina and started a blog to document her experience of being stranded at the city's Convention Center for three days. The blog became one of the earliest political blogs in Spain, and she subsequently used it to advocate for the potential of Web 2.0 to improve the connection between politics and citizens and to advance transparency.

== Open data and data feminism ==
=== Iniciativa Barcelona Open Data ===
In 2016, Muñoz co-founded Iniciativa Barcelona Open Data (IBOD), the Barcelona node of the Open Data Institute. The organization focuses on applying data technology to the public and social sectors, promoting open data innovation processes, and providing training on open data management.

Through IBOD, Muñoz has developed the concept of "data feminism" (feminismo de datos) in Spain, advocating for gender-disaggregated data and the application of data technologies to advance women's rights. In 2018, IBOD launched the Data x Women (Data x Dones) project to analyze data on violence against women.

=== DataLab La Ciba ===
In collaboration with the municipality of Santa Coloma de Gramenet, Muñoz developed the DataLab La Ciba, a gender and open data observatory housed within La CIBA, a municipal space dedicated to women, innovation, and feminist economics. The observatory carries out social innovation projects using open data with a gender perspective, including analyses on sexual trafficking and prostitution, the impact of the COVID-19 pandemic on women, and women in the labour market.

=== AI and gender ===
In November 2023, Muñoz delivered the lecture "Artificial Intelligence and violence against women: the redimensioning of sexual violence through technology" at a seminar on sexual violence organized by the RTVE Equality Observatory. In 2024, she directed a report on AI risks and possibilities for women's rights for the organization Dones en Xarxa.

== Feminist organizations ==
=== Dones en Xarxa ===
In 2004, Muñoz co-founded Dones en Xarxa (Women in Network), a Catalan feminist association, together with journalist Montserrat Boix and writer Gemma Lienas. Muñoz serves as president of the organization, which promotes women's rights through information and communication technologies and works to reduce the digital gender gap. The organization hosts the annual WomanLiderTIC international conference on women's leadership in technology.

In 2018, Muñoz also spoke at the Elcano Royal Institute on the topic of new digital gender gaps, identifying five key areas including the promotion of STEM vocations among girls and the visibility of women at technology events.

== Awards ==
- 2010 – Premio Focus al Conocimiento Libre (Focus Prize for Free Knowledge), awarded by Iniciativa Focus in the category of "referent political figure for free software".
- 2022 – Best Practices in Inclusive Data Treatment Prize (Premi Bones Pràctiques al Tractament de Dades Inclusiu), awarded by the Association of Women Journalists of Catalonia as part of its Non-Sexist Communication Awards.
- 2026 – Alan Turing Award for Social Commitment (Premi Alan Turing al Compromís Social), awarded at the 31st Nit de les Telecomunicacions in Barcelona, shared ex aequo with Alicia Coca Cantos.
