= Macarena Montesinos =

Spanish politician (born 1961)

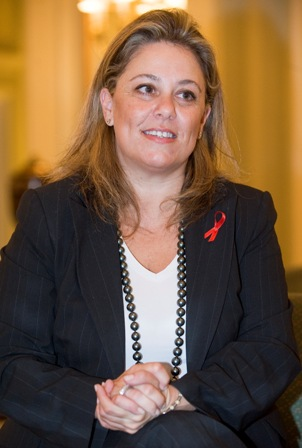
- Montesinos in 2014

Member of the Congress of Deputies
- Incumbent
- Assumed office 21 May 2019
- Constituency: Alicante
- In office 2 April 2004 – 13 January 2016
- Constituency: Alicante

Personal details
- Born: 30 September 1961 (age 64)
- Party: People's Party
- Parent: Juan Antonio Montesinos (father)

Macarena Montesinos de Miguel (born 30 September 1961) is a Spanish politician. She has been a member of the Congress of Deputies since 2019, having previously served from 2004 to 2016. From 1995 to 2004, she was a member of the Corts Valencianes. She is the daughter of Juan Antonio Montesinos.
