= Jesús Membrado Giner =

Spanish politician (born 1949)

Jesús Membrado Giner (27 January 1949, Bordón, Spain) is a Spanish politician for the Spanish Socialist Workers' Party (PSOE).

Married with one daughter, Membrado gained a degree in History and Geography and subsequently worked as a school teacher. In 1993, he became Secretary General of the Aragon regional branch of the Unión General de Trabajadores a major Spanish Trade Union historically linked to the PSOE. He held that position until 2004.

He entered politics in 2004 when he was elected to the Spanish national parliament as a deputy for Zaragoza province. He was re-elected in 2008 and headed the PSOE list on both occasions.
