= Alejandro Alonso Núñez =

Spanish politician (born 1951)

Member of the Congress of Deputies
- Incumbent
- Assumed office 2004
- Constituency: Toledo

Personal details
- Born: 20 August 1951 (age 74) Valdepeñas, Spain

Alejandro Alonso Núñez (born 20 August 1951) is a Spanish politician.

Married with two daughters, Alonso Núñez is a qualified veterinarian. He was a government official of the Cuerpo Nacional de Veterinarios (National Body of Veterinarians), and served as an advisor of Industry in Castilla-La Mancha from 1993 — 1996, as well as an advisor for Agriculture and Environment in Castilla-La Mancha from 1996 — 2003. Earlier he served as advisor to the Presidency of Castilla-La Mancha from 1987 — 1993.

He has been a presidential spokesman for the Socialist Municipal Group of Toledo and President of the Provincial Executive for the Spanish Socialist Workers' Party in Toledo (2004). In 2004 he was elected to the Spanish Congress of Deputies representing Toledo district and was re-elected in 2008.
