= Baudilio Tomé Muguruza =

Spanish politician

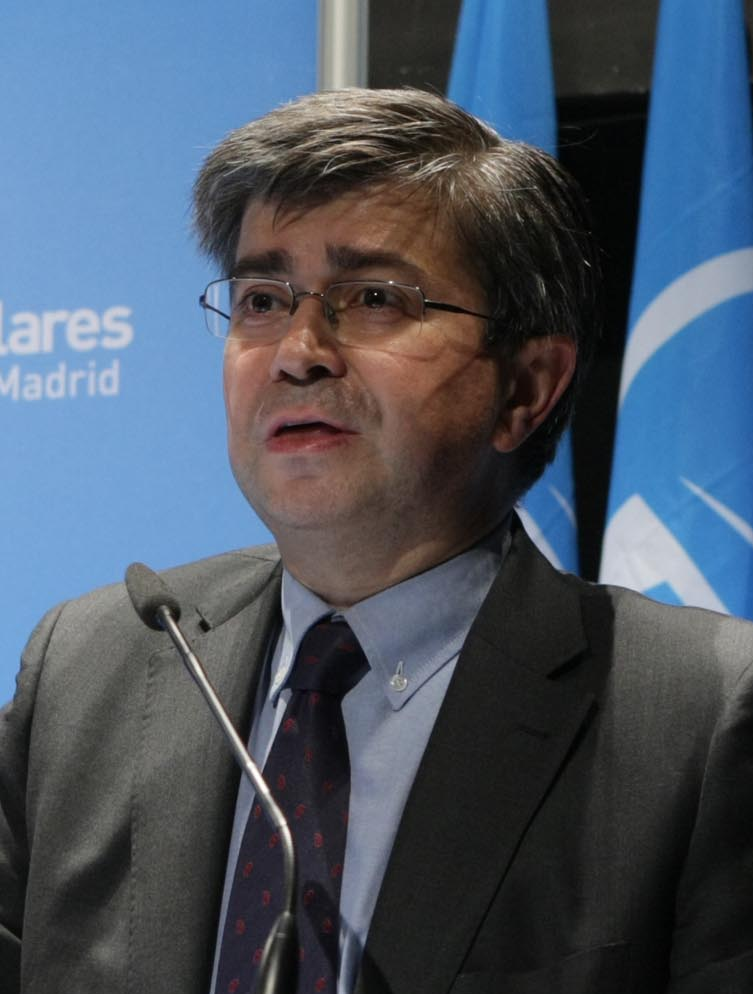
Baudilio Tomé in 2011

Baudilio Tomé Muguruza (born 12 May 1962 in Leon, Spain) is a Spanish politician who belongs to the People's Party (PP).

Married, with three children, he holds a degree in Economic and Business Sciences and a Masters in Law and International fiscal issues. After working as a state auditor he was appointed Secretary of State for Telecommunications in May 2000 serving until 2002. In November 2002, Prime Minister Jose Maria Aznar appointed him Secretary General of the new Foundation of Analysis and Social Studies

In 2004 he was elected to the Spanish Congress of Deputies representing León Province. However in January 2008, against the wishes of the local PP branch in Aragon, he was imposed as the second candidate on the PP list to contest Zaragoza Province and was elected there in March 2008.

He graduated from Complutense University of Madrid, National University of Distance Education, and Harvard Law School (LLM).
