= Ramón Moreno Bustos =

Spanish politician

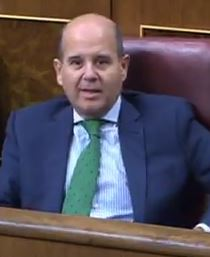

Ramón Moreno Bustos (Zaragoza, Spain, 26 May 1966) is a Spanish politician who belongs to the People's Party (PP).

Married with one daughter he gained a degree in Business Law. He entered politics at the 1995 regional election when he was elected to the Aragonese Corts, the legislature of the Spanish region of Aragon. However he resigned one year later when he was elected to the Spanish Congress of Deputies representing Zaragoza Province. He was re-elected in the three subsequent elections in 2000, 2004 and 2008. On the latter occasion he was the third placed candidate on the PP list.
