= Miguel Ángel Heredia =

Spanish politician (born 1966)

Miguel Angel Heredia
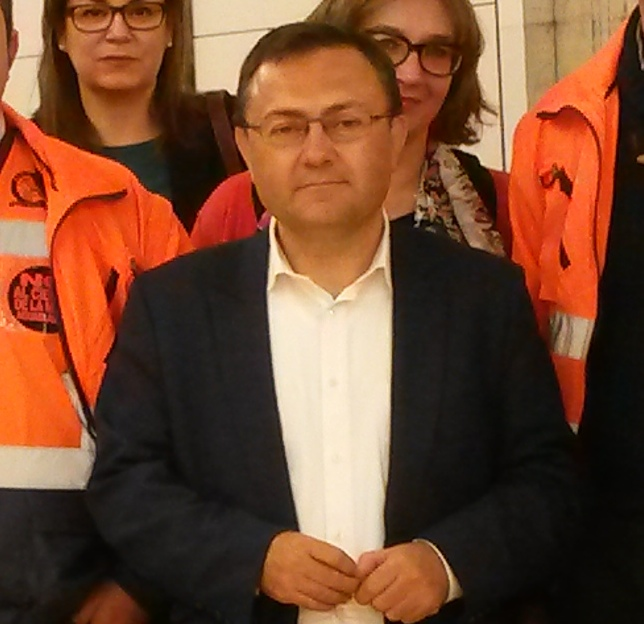

Deputy in the Cortes Generales
- Incumbent
- Assumed office 25 March 1996

Personal details
- Born: 21 August 1966 (age 59) Mollina, Spain
- Party: Spanish Socialist Workers' Party

Miguel Ángel Heredia (born 21 August 1966) is a Spanish politician. He was a deputy in the Congress of Deputies representing Málaga in the 6th, 7th, 8th, 9th, 10th, 11th and 12th legislatures of Spain respectively. He was elected to the Senate of Spain for the 13th legislature.
