= Ignacio Astarloa =

Spanish politician and professor

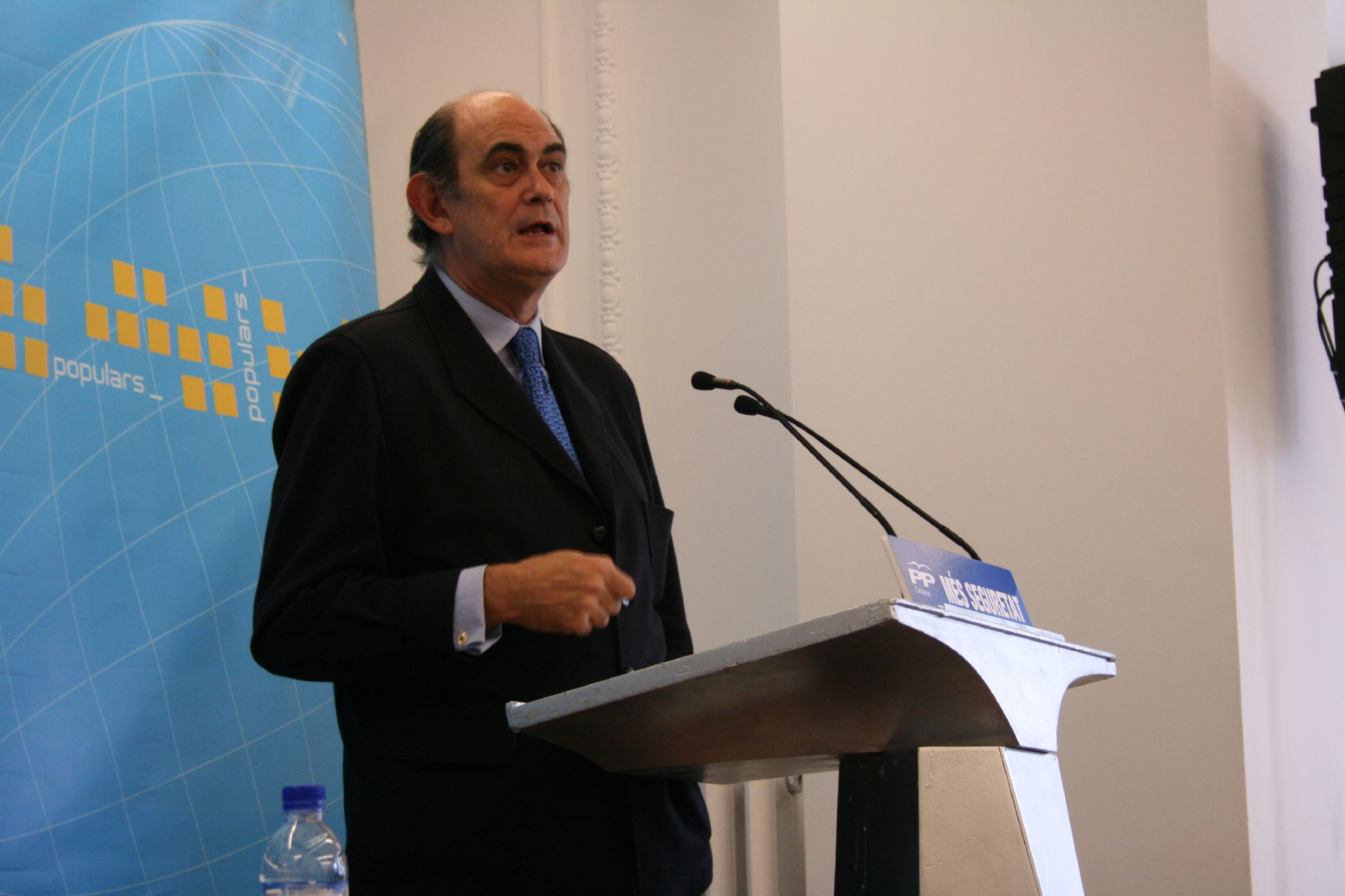
Ignacio Astarloa, 19 October 2007, Barcelona.

Ignacio Astarloa Huarte-Mendicoa (Madrid, Spain, 10 September 1955) is a Spanish politician and University Professor who belongs to the People's Party (PP).

Married with three children, Astarloa graduated in Law and Economic and Business Sciences. After working as a lawyer, he became Under-Secretary of state for Justice under Angel Acebes in 2000 serving until 2002 when he became Secretary of State for Security. Although the PP lost the 2004 General Election to the Spanish Socialist Workers' Party (PSOE), he was elected to the Spanish Congress of Deputies representing Vizcaya Province. For the 2008 election he headed the PP list and was re-elected, although the PP lost one of their two seats at that election. During the campaign, he criticised the rival PSOE stating that negotiations with the armed separatist group ETA and moves towards an independent Basque state were more likely under a PSOE government. After the 2004 election he had been appointed Secretary for Liberty, Security and Justice within the PP. However on 21 June 2008 he resigned his offices within the PP citing dissatisfaction with the leadership of Mariano Rajoy but retained his seat in the Congress.
