= Alfredo Arola Blanquet =

Spanish politician (born 1948)

Alfredo Francisco Arola Blanquet (24 July 1948, Barcelona, Spain) is a Spanish politician for the Spanish Socialist Workers' Party (PSOE).

Arola entered politics in 1983 when he was elected to the Aragonese Corts representing Zargoza Province. He was re-elected in 1987 and 1991 and served as Minister for Public Health, Welfare and Employment in the Aragonese regional administration.

In 2000 he entered national politics when he was elected to the Spanish national parliament as a deputy for Zaragoza province. He was re-elected in 2004 and 2008 as the third placed candidate on the PSOE list.
