= Joaquín Calomarde =

Spanish politician (1956–2019)

Joaquín Calomarde Gramage (30 November 1956 – 20 March 2019) was a Spanish politician and former deputy who belonged to the People's Party (PP).

== Early political career ==
Born in Valencia, Spain and married, with one son, Calomarde holds a degree in philosophy and educational sciences. He entered politics in 1991 when he was elected as a PP deputy to the Cortes Valencianas, the Valencian regional parliament, serving until 1995. He also served as the president of the Valencian education council and the vice president of the Valencian culture council.

In 2000 he was elected to the Spanish Congress of Deputies representing Valencia region for the PP and was re-elected in 2004.

== Resignation from the PP ==
On 29 March 2007 Calomarde published an article in the newspaper El País. This contravened a PP directive which the party had issued days earlier advising its members to cease cooperation with the newspaper following statements by its owner Jesús de Polanco, which the party considered offensive. Consequently, the PP parliamentary party removed Calomarde from all positions held in the parliament. Days later, Calomarde published another article in El País, criticising the leadership's positions on terrorism and accusing them of using the issue for purely electoral ends. On 14 April 2007 Calomarde published an open letter to the PP leadership announcing his resignation from the party. However he retained his parliamentary seat and subsequently sat in the mixed group of deputies which consists of parties unable to form a technical group of five deputies. He did not stand in the 2008 election.

He also taught philosophy at the IES Ramon Llull, Valencia.
