= Vicente Martínez-Pujalte =

Spanish politician

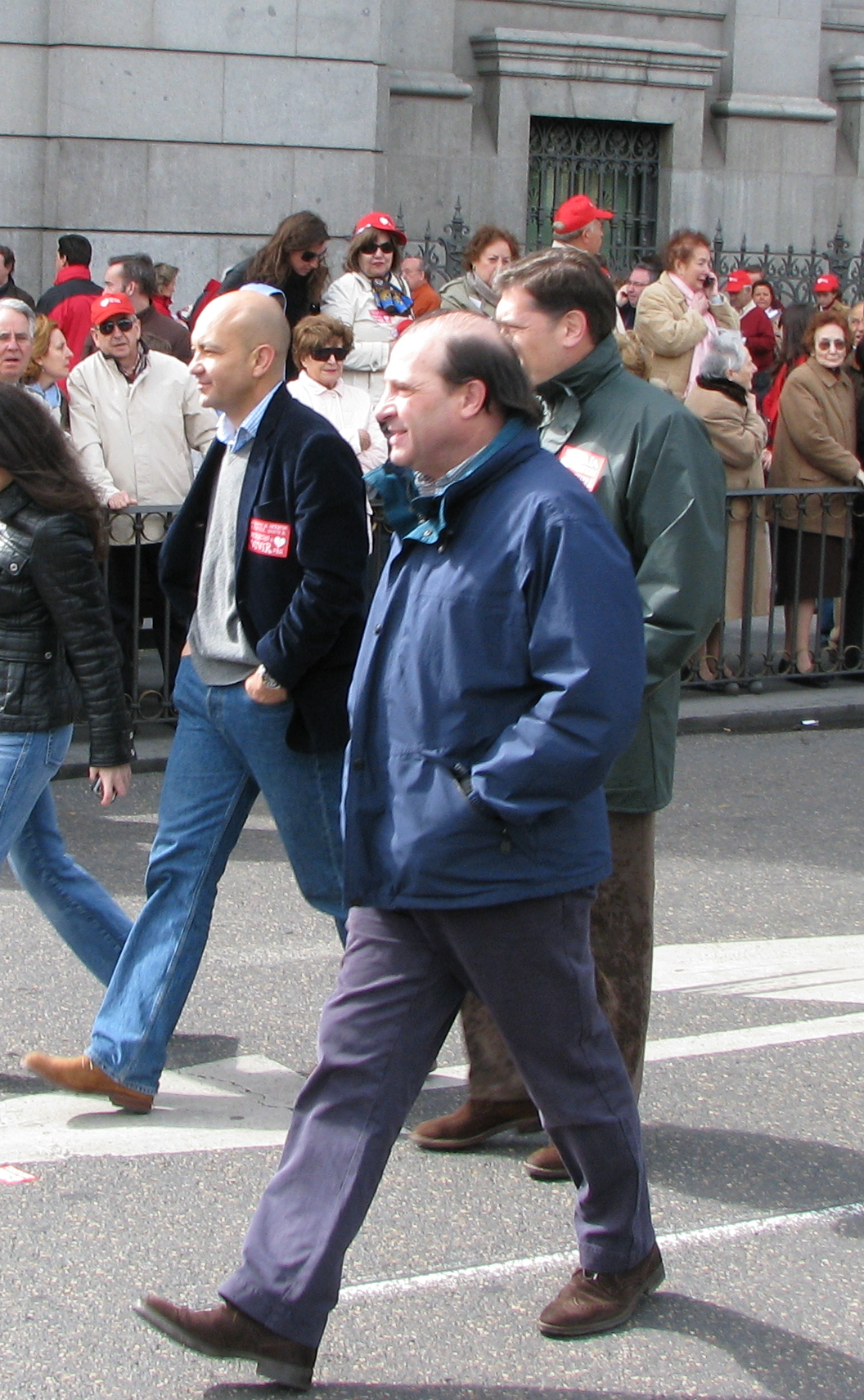
Martinez Pujalte stepping into the auditorium for his manifesto, 2009

Vicente Martínez-Pujalte López (Murcia, Spain, 11 January 1956) is a Spanish politician who was a Popular Party (PP) deputy for the Murcia region.

A former University Professor of economic sciences at the University of Valencia he is also a technical officer in the Official Chamber of Commerce for the Valencia region. Additionally, he has been vice-chairman of Levante Football Club.

== Political career ==
Martínez-Pujalte joined the Spanish Congress of Deputies on 28 June 1996 in substitution for José Manuel García-Margallo y Marfil. He represented the Valencia region until 2008 when he moved to the Murcia region. He is the brother of Jesús Roque Martínez-Pujalte who represented the Union of the Democratic Centre (UCD) in the 1977-1979 congress.

== Published works ==
- Analisis Del Sistema De Financiacion Autonomica: Bases Para Un Nuevo Modelo by Vicente Martinez-Pujalte Lopez and Pablo Oliete Vivas

Hardcover, Bancaja, ISBN 84-89413-72-X (84-89413-72-X)
