= Sebastián González Vázquez =

Spanish lawyer and politician

President of the Provincial Deputation of Ávila
- In office 1993–2004
- Preceded by: Alfredo Barranco
- Succeeded by: Agustín González

Treasurer of the People's Party
- Incumbent
- Assumed office June 2018
- President: Pablo Casado; Alberto Núñez Feijóo
- Preceded by: Carmen Navarro

Member of the Congress of Deputies
- In office 14 March 2004 – 27 October 2015
- Constituency: Ávila

Senator
- Incumbent
- Assumed office 13 January 2016
- Constituency: Ávila

Personal details
- Born: January 20, 1956 (age 70) La Adrada, Spain

Sebastián González Vázquez (born 20 January 1956) is a Spanish lawyer and politician from the People's Party. He served as the president of the Provincial Deputation of Ávila from 1993 to 2004, and has been a member of both the Congress of Deputies and the Senate during various legislative periods.

== Biography ==
Born on 20 January 1956 in the municipality of La Adrada, González was politically mentored by Feliciano Blázquez. He graduated in law from the Complutense University of Madrid and later earned his doctorate from the University of Burgos. Related to Ángel Acebes — he is the brother-in-law of Acebes' brother Víctor — they share a close friendship and operated a law firm together in Ávila during the mid-1980s. During Acebes' tenure as Secretary General of the People's Party, González served as the National Secretary of Organization.

González was a councillor for the City Council of Ávila from 1987 to 2004 and served as President of the Provincial Deputation of Ávila from 1993 to 2004. He was elected as a regional representative for Ávila in the 1991 regional election, serving in the Cortes of Castile and León during its 3rd legislative period (1991–1995). In 2004, he was elected to the Congress of Deputies for Ávila and was re-elected in the 2008 and 2011 elections. He left the Congress in 2015, subsequently winning a seat in the Senate in the 2015 and 2016 elections.

In July 2018, González was appointed treasurer of the People's Party.
