= Juan Morano =

Spanish politician

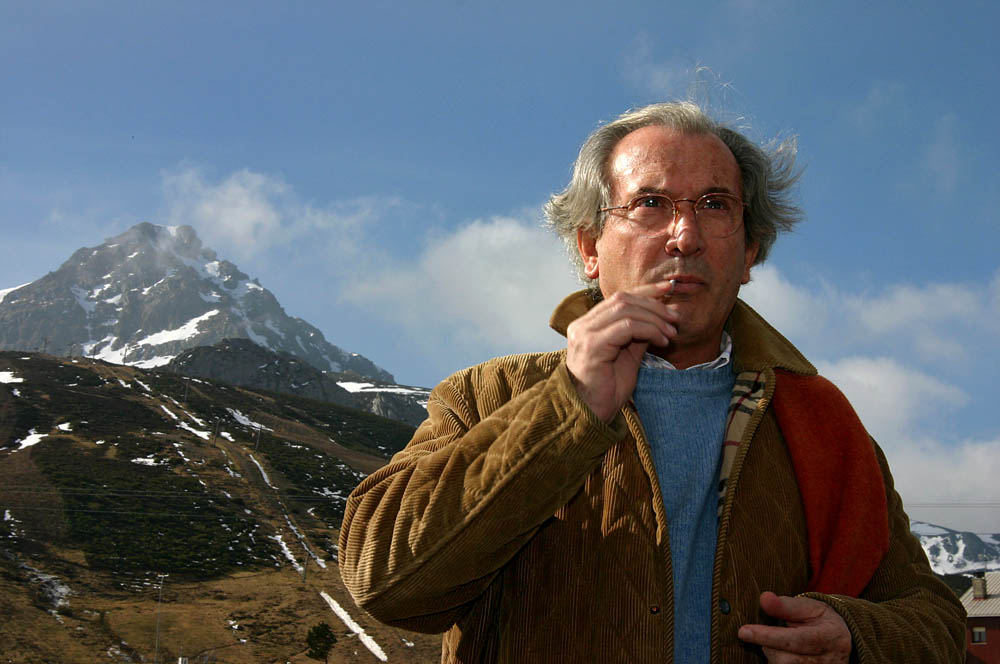

Juan Morano Masa (5 December 1941 – 4 May 2018) was a Spanish politician who was a member of the Congress of Deputies from 2004 to 2015.. He also served as the mayor of León from 1979 to 1987 and from 1989 to 1995.
