= Yolanda Casaus Rodríguez =

Spanish politician (born 1974)

Yolanda Casaus Rodríguez (Alcañiz, Teruel Province, 3 July 1974) is a Spanish politician who belongs to the Spanish Socialist Workers' Party.

Single, Casaus worked as an infant teacher in the Juan Ramón Alegre de Andorra state school in Teruel. She was affiliated with the major Spanish Trade Union the Unión General de Trabajadores and served as a Union representative. She also held positions of responsibility in the Young Socialists of Aragon, the local youth wing of the PSOE.

In 2004 she was elected to the national parliament as a deputy for Teruel, being re-elected in 2008.
