= José Ignacio Echániz =

Spanish politician (born 1963)

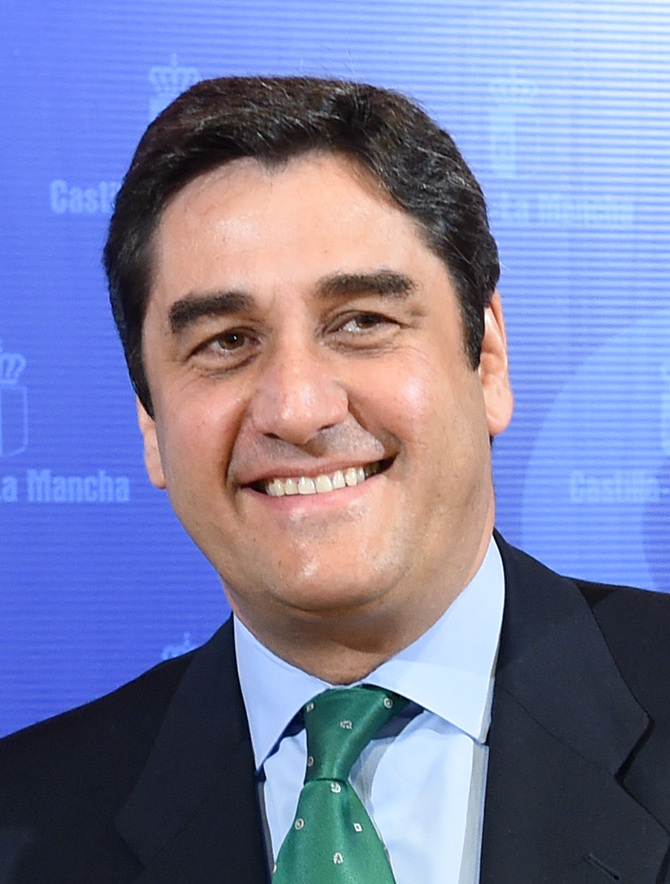
- Echániz in 2015

Member of the Congress of Deputies
- In office 13 January 2016 – 17 August 2023
- Constituency: Madrid (2016–2019); Guadalajara (2019–2023)
- In office 2 April 2004 – 27 June 2011
- Succeeded by: Marta Valdenebro Rodríguez
- Constituency: Guadalajara
- In office 3 March 1996 – 10 July 1999
- Preceded by: José Manuel Fernández Norniella
- Succeeded by: Luis Fernando Bastarreche Gravalos
- Constituency: Madrid

Personal details
- Born: 14 September 1963 (age 62)
- Party: People's Party

José Ignacio Echániz Salgado (born 14 September 1963) is a Spanish politician. He was a member of the Congress of Deputies from 1996 to 1999, from 2004 to 2011, and from 2016 to 2023. From 2011 to 2015, he served as minister of health and social affairs of Castilla-La Mancha.
