= Pedro María Azpiazu =

Spanish politician (born 1957)

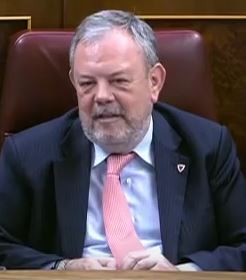

Pedro María Azpiazu Uriarte (Bilbao, 28 April 1957) is a Basque Nationalist Party (PNV) politician who represents Biscay Province in the Spanish Congress of Deputies, where he serves as a PNV spokesman. Azpiazu was first elected at the 2000 general election.
