= IDEAS Foundation for Progress =

Spanish think tank

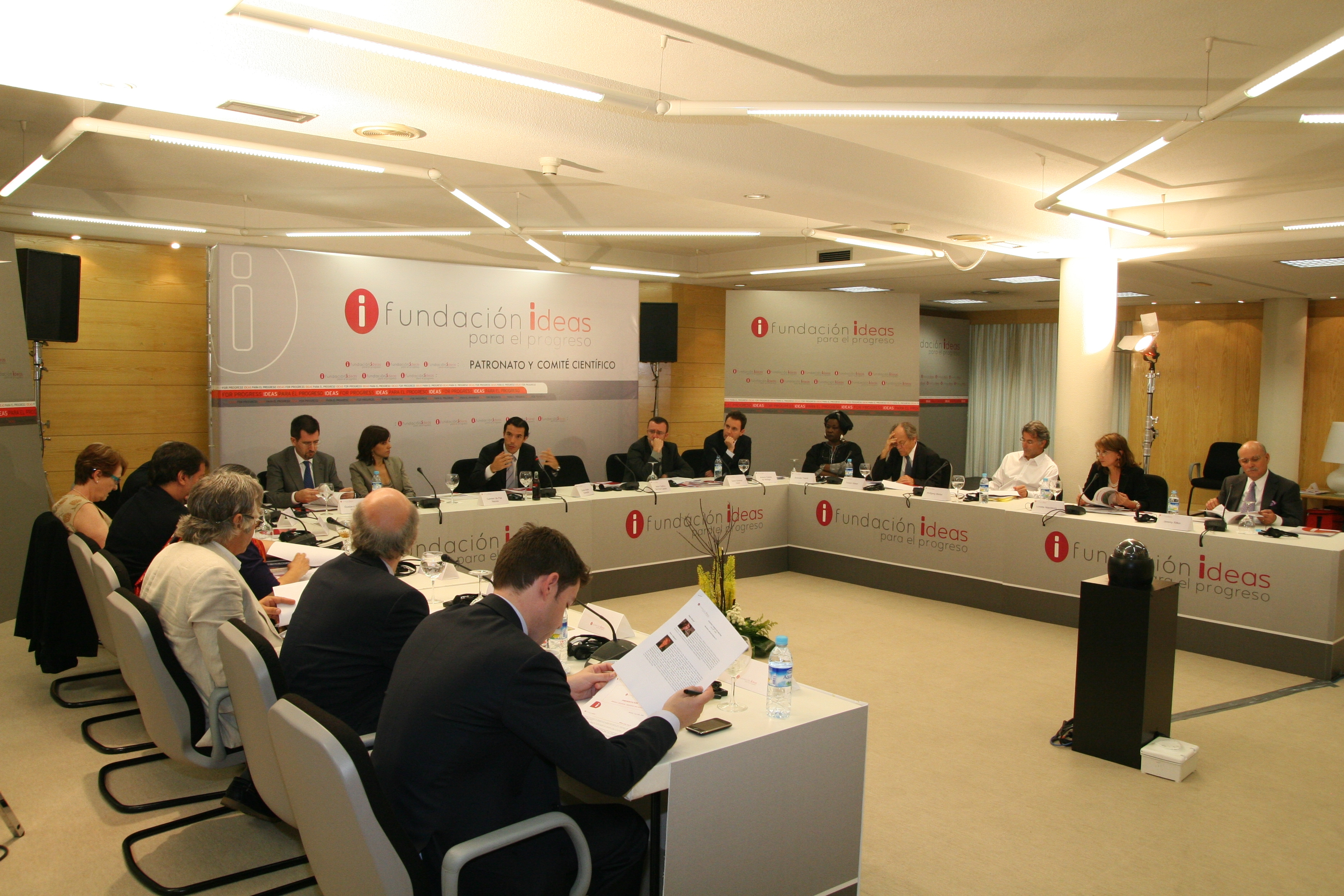
Board of Trustees and Scientific Committee meeting at the IDEAS Foundation.

The Ideas Foundation for Progress (Spanish: Fundación Ideas para el Progreso), also known as the Fundación IDEAS (IDEAS Foundation), was a Spanish think tank that works on political ideas and proposals for the Spanish Socialist Workers' Party (PSOE). In this regard, it integrates the foundations previously created and tied to the PSOE.

"IDEAS" is an acronym which stands for "Igualdad, Derecho, Ecología, Acción y Solidaridad" (Equality, Rights, Ecology, Action and Solidarity), concepts of reference to the social democratic ideology of this think tank.

Spanish President José Luis Rodríguez Zapatero presides over the Foundation as its honorary President although the highest authority in the foundation is its Executive Vice President Jesús Caldera.

It was dissolved in 2014 following a scandal involving allegations of fraud and misuse of funds linked to its then director, Carlos Mulas.

== Origin ==
After Jesús Caldera left the Ministry of Labor in April 2008, it was announced that his new challenge was to create, put in motion and preside over a large think tank. In July of that same year, during the 37th Federal Congress of the Spanish Socialist Workers Party, José Luis Rodríguez Zapatero, Secretary General of the party and President of Spain announced the name of the new think tank that would unite the smaller foundations tied to the PSOE:

- Pablo Iglesias Institute: design, drive and execute international cooperation programs in the area of strengthening institutions, especially in Latin America and Africa.
- Ramón Rubial Institute: promotes and defends the rights of Spanish citizens living abroad and of foreign people residing in Spain.
- Jaime Vera Institute: is charged with training staff and elected officials in the areas of leadership and political communication as well as topics such as economics, equality, policy and social rights.
- Council on Global Progress: An advisory body of the foundation for international questions led by Felipe González.

The IDEAS Foundation’s Board of Trustees serves as the governing body and representation foundation. The board members are: José Luís Rodríguez Zapatero; Jesús Caldera; Manuel Chaves; José Blanco López; Marcelino Iglesias; Elena Valenciano; Cristina Narbona; Pedro Zerolo; María González Veracruz; Reyes Maroto; Antonio Hernando; Cándida Martínez; Octavio Granado; Hugo Morán; Soledad Pérez; Soledad Cabezón; Xoan Cornide; José Andrés Torres Mora; Ludolfo Paramio; and Lentxu Rubial.

Further, the Scientific Committee serves in an advisory capacity to the foundation on which direction to take in terms of priorities in investigation and other activities. Its members are: Pedro Alonso; Helen Caldicott; Torben Iversen; George Lakoff; Wolfgang Merkel; María Teresa Miras; Dominique Mollard; Loretta Napoleoni; Guillermo O´Donnell; Emilio Ontiveros; Philip Pettit; Joseph Stiglitz; Jeremy Rifkin; Maria João Rodrigues; Jeffrey Sachs; Nicholas Stern; André Sapir; Vandana Shiva; Aminata Traoré; Torsten Wiesel; Kemal Derviş; and Pippa Norris.

== Working areas ==
The foundation acts as a laboratory of ideas, developing working papers and reports in the following areas:

- Economy and sustainability: reports about a new energy model for Spain, taxes on international financial transactions, about improving financial markets and economic priorities for Europe.
- International and Cooperation: studies about the Lisbon treaty, discrimination and the creation of an “ATILA” space (transatlantic integrated area for greater liberty).
- Politics, citizenship and equality: documents about citizen participation, social democracy and the new social agenda.

== See also ==
- Think tanks in Spain
- FAES the conservative counterpart of IDEAS
