= Mulas (surname) =

Mulas is a surname. Notable people with the surname include:

- Carlos Mulas Granados (born 1974), Spanish economist and professor, senior economist of the International Monetary Fund
- Franco Mulas (1938–2023), Italian painter
- Giulio Mulas (born 1996), Italian footballer
- Matteo Mulas (born 1992), Italian rower

== See also ==
- Mula (disambiguation), which includes a list of people with the surname
