= David Quirós =

Spanish politician

Mayor of L'Hospitalet de Llobregat
- Incumbent
- Assumed office 15 June 2024
- Preceded by: Núria Marín

Member of L'Hospitalet de Llobregat City Council
- Incumbent
- Assumed office 26 July 2016

Personal details
- Born: 21 March 1974 (age 52) L'Hospitalet de Llobregat, Spain
- Party: Socialists' Party of Catalonia
- Education: University of Barcelona; University Ramon Llull
- Occupation: Politician

David Quirós Brito (born 1974) is a Spanish politician of the Socialists' Party of Catalonia (PSC). He entered the city council of L'Hospitalet de Llobregat, the second largest city of Catalonia, in 2016 and became mayor in 2024.

== Biography ==
Born in L'Hospitalet de Llobregat in the Barcelona metropolitan area, Quirós graduated with a diploma in labour relations from the University of Barcelona and a master's degree in public management from University Ramon Llull. As of 2024, he is married and has one son and one daughter, and has coached basketball teams in his hometown.

For six years up to 2004, Quirós led the Socialist Youth of Catalonia (JSC) in L'Hospitalet. In July 2016, he took a seat on the city council when Mercè Perea left for the Congress of Deputies. Under mayor Núria Marín, he was the councillor in charge of culture, social innovation and District III of the city.

Quirós was re-elected in the 2019 and 2023 local elections. On 22 May 2024, Marín announced her resignation after 16 years in office. Quirós was appointed by his party to succeed her, and on 15 June 2024, was elected by the council as mayor, with 11 votes out of 24.

Quirós was elected to the Provincial Deputation of Barcelona in 2023. He was made a vice president of Localret, the publicly owned telecommunications consortium. In March 2024, PSC secretary general Salvador Illa named Quirós as a national secretary of the party.
