= Ramón de Manjarrés =

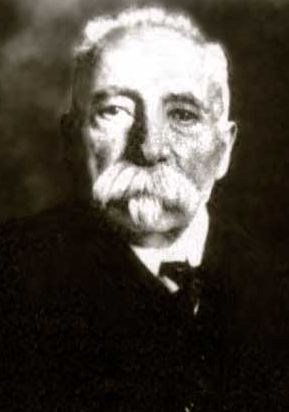
- Born: 1827; Barcelona, Spain
- Died: 1918 (aged 90–91); Seville, Spain
- Occupation(s): Industrial engineer, professor, and academic

Ramón de Manjarrés y de Bofarull (1827, Barcelona – 1918, Seville) was a Spanish industrial engineer, professor, and academic.

== Biography ==
Born in 1827 in Barcelona, he studied industrial engineering specializing in chemistry in Madrid, Seville, and Barcelona. He obtained his degree from the Special School of Barcelona in 1869. He worked in stamp manufacturing workshops in Barcelona. In 1855, he was sponsored by the Provincial Deputation of Barcelona as a scientific worker for the 1855 Paris Exposition. In 1862, the Provincial Council of Seville commissioned him to study chemical industries and agricultural arts at the 1862 International Exhibition in London. In 1856, he was appointed professor of General and Applied Chemistry through competitive examination at the Seville Industrial School; in 1860, he was assigned the chair of Inorganic Chemistry and Chemical Analysis at the same school, of which he became director in 1863.

In 1866, due to the closing of the Superior Industrial School of Seville, he assumed the chair of Inorganic Chemistry and Chemical Analysis at the Industrial School of Barcelona, becoming its director in 1868. By royal order in 1891, he was appointed tenured professor at the Faculty of Sciences of the University of Seville, in the section of physical-chemical sciences. From March 21, 1892, he was assigned by the Directorate-General of Public Instruction to the meteorological station in Seville. In 1856, he supervised the installation and arrangement of the chemistry laboratory and cabinet at the Seville Industrial School, as well as the establishment of a mineralogical collection, many of which Manjarrés donated.

Between 1868 and 1872, under his direction and initiative, several night classes for artisans were offered at the School of Industrial Engineers in Barcelona, with Manjarrés teaching experimental chemistry. In 1872, he was part of a commission appointed by the Barcelona Provincial Council to propose a comprehensive plan for organizing free education under the province, which was approved on April 24, 1873, including that of the Provincial School of Arts and Crafts. He took charge of its direction and taught Applied Chemistry.

When the School of Industrial Engineers was installed in the building constructed for the literary university in 1871, he arranged the mineralogical museum and inaugurated the raw materials and finished products, directing the installation of the chemistry laboratory. Under his direction, the textiles section of the School of Arts and Crafts was organized. He served as a member and judge at various regional and foreign exhibitions and was part of the committee for the participation of Spanish exhibitors in some of them. At the 1888 Universal Exposition in Barcelona, he was a member of the general council, president of the Installation Commission, special delegate of the Catalan Agricultural Institute of San Isidro, judge of the official section, the food group, and president of the jury to award special prizes granted by the Minister of Development. He was awarded an honorary diploma for his collaborative work.

In 1870, he directed the biweekly newspaper Guía de la Industria in Barcelona and contributed to the magazine Los Vinos y los Aceites (Madrid), the Encyclopedic Dictionary of Agriculture, Livestock, and Rural Industries, and a Dictionary of Chemistry translated and annotated with data relating to Spain, as well as being one of the two directors of this publication. He also contributed to La Agricultura Española (Seville), La Gaceta Industrial (Madrid), the Revista Tecnológica de la Asociación de Ingenieros Industriales (Barcelona), and the Revista del Instituto Agrícola Catalán de San Isidro, among others.

He was a corresponding member of the Spanish Royal Academy of Sciences. In 1867, he was appointed resident partner of the Academy of Natural Sciences and Arts of Barcelona. He was also an honorary member of the College of Pharmacists of Barcelona, awarded a first-class medal, and of the Economic Society of Friends of Barcelona. At the Royal Academy of Natural Sciences and Arts of Barcelona, he served as president and participated in its reorganization. He was vice president of the society Fomento de la Producción Nacional.

As a member of the Catalan Agricultural Institute of San Isidro, he gave lectures on wine and oil production, and wrote about alcohol issues, the sericultural industry, wine adulteration, phylloxera, and vineyard renewal. He was part of all the committees related to exhibitions in which the Agricultural Institute participated, especially at the 1888 Universal Exhibition in Barcelona. He died in 1918 in Seville.

== Works ==
- Lessons in Inorganic Industrial Chemistry, Seville 1860. One volume in 4°. Work declared as a textbook for industrial schools.
- Report on the International Exhibition held in London in 1862, written by Germán Losada and Ramón de Manjarrés, etc. Printed by order of the Excellent Provincial Council. Seville impr. La Andalucía 1863. In 4°, 344 pages with plates. Manjarrés wrote the part relating to advances in chemical industries and agricultural arts.
- Influence of rocky phosphates on vegetation. Award-winning report by the Royal Academy of Sciences of Madrid in the public competition in 1862. Published the following year in Volume VI of the Memoirs of said Academy.
- Report on atmospheric barometry (read at the Royal Academy of Natural Sciences and Arts of Barcelona on December 5, 1867. M, S. Archive id. box 25).
- On the production of cotton in Spain. (Id. on October 14, 1872).
- Report on the improvement of our oils and the need to present them well elaborated and clarified. Barcelona, imp. de Brusi, 1871.
- Agricultural lectures held in Barcelona according to the provisions of the law of August 1, 1876, etc. Falsification of wines by means of fuchsine, etc. Barcelona, imp. de Ramírez y C.ª, 1877. In 4°, 21 pages.
- Report on the means fraudulently used to color wine, especially the use of fuchsine. Report given to the board of the San Isidro Agricultural Institute. Barcelona, imp. Barcelonesa, 1877, In 4°, 19 pages.
- Manufacture, clarification, and improvement of oils. Topic developed in agricultural conferences in Barcelona on May 13, 1877, Barcelona, Est, tip. de N. Ramírez y C.ª, 1877.
- Extraction of oils from oily residues by means of carbon disulfide. Madrid, Cuesta, editors, 1879.
- Influence of the quality of water on the operation of steam generators, and the means used to improve their nature and prevent the effects of encrustations that form in said devices. Report read at the Royal Academy of Natural Sciences and Arts of Barcelona on May 26, 1883.
- Obituary of Dr. D. Jaime Arbós, read at the session held by the Royal Academy of Natural Sciences and Arts on March 15, 1889.

== Bibliography ==
- Elías de Molins, Antonio (1895), "Manjarrès y de Bofarull (D. Ramón de)", Diccionario biográfico y bibliográfico de escritores y artistas catalanes del siglo XIX, vol. II, Barcelona: Imp. de Fidel Giró, ISBN 9785873219971
- Monés i Pujol-Busquets, Jordi (2005), Formació professional i desenvolupament econòmic i social català, 1714-1939, Institut d'Estudis Catalans, ISBN 978-84-7283-792-8
