= Corbacho =

Corbacho may refer to:

- Celestino Corbacho (1949-), a Spanish politician
- José Corbacho (1965-), a Spanish humorist film director
- Alberto Corbacho (1984-), a Spanish basketball player
