= Matilde de la Torre =

Spanish writer, socialist and politician (1884–1946)

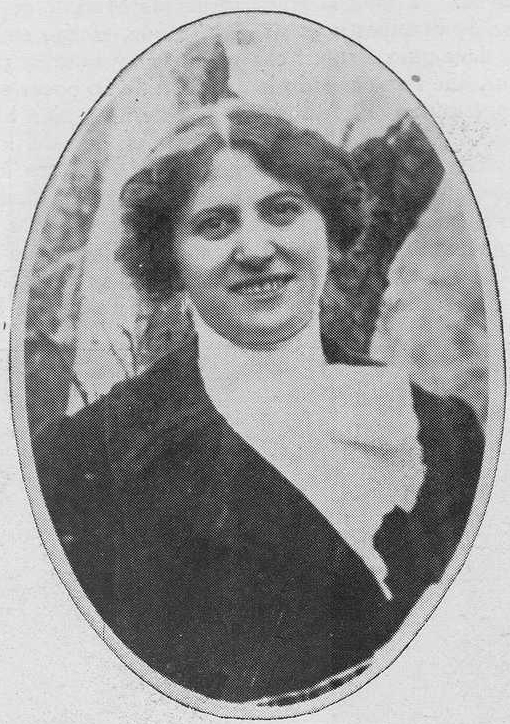
- Matilde de la Torre in 1918
- Born: 14 March 1884; Cabezón de la Sal, Cantabria, Spain
- Died: 19 March 1946 (aged 62); Cuernavaca, Morelos, Mexico
- Occupations: Journalist, writer, educator and socialist politician
- Political party: Spanish Socialist Workers' Party (PSOE)

Matilde de la Torre Gutiérrez (14 March 1884 – 19 March 1946) was a Spanish journalist, writer, educator and socialist politician. She was elected as a Deputy in the Cortes Republicanas with the Spanish Socialist Workers Party (PSOE) in 1933 and 1936. After the defeat of the Republican faction in the Spanish Civil War (1936–1939), she was exiled from Spain and lived in France and Mexico until her death.

== Family ==
De la Torre was born on 14 March 1884 in Cabezón de la Sal, Cantabria, Spain, into a wealthy and liberal family. Her parents were Eduardo de la Torre, a notary in Cabezón de la Sal, and Ana Gutiérrez Cueto. She was orphaned at a young age, and cared for her disabled brother, Carlos de la Torre, in adulthood.

De la Torre married her cousin Sixto Gutiérrez in Arequipa, Peru, aged 29. The marriage lasted for 15 days. Another cousin was the artist María Blanchard. Her grandfather Castor Gutiérrez had founded the newspaper The Mountain Bee in 1856.

== Career ==
In 1917, de la Torre published her first work Jardín de damas curiosas (Garden of curious ladies), an epistolary novel on feminism, presented as a series of letters from an aunt, tía Pulquería, to her niece and nephew. The title was homonymous to a painting by her cousin María Blanchard. In the 1920s, she wrote a series of socio-political essays which defended the political system of the restoration and analysed the work of philosopher and essayist José Ortega y Gasset. The two most notable essays were titled Don Quijote, Rey de España (Don Quixote, King of Spain, 1928) and El Ágora (The Agora, 1929). As a journalist, she wrote for La Región and El Socialista.

In 1920s, de la Torre founded the libertarian education institution Torre Academy in Cabezón de la Sal, which followed the precepts of the Institución Libre de Enseñanza and the principal of free teaching of integral education. In the 1924, she founded and directed the peasant choir Orfeón de Voces Cántabras (which performed at a folk festival in 1932 at the Royal Albert Hall in London, England) and the Cabezón de la Sal Dance Group.

In 1931, de la Torre published El banquete de Saturno: novela social (The Symposium of Saturn), a satirical work recounting a failed Marxist-socialist dictatorship which strongly resembled Soviet Russia. In 1932, she gave a speech on feminism and pacifism at the First Spanish Eugenic Conferences organized by the Spanish League of Social Reform. Also in 1932, she contributed the prologue to Enrique D. Madrazo's Pedagogía y eugenesia, cultivo de la especie humana (Pedagogy and eugenics, cultivation of the human species).

De la Torre joined the Spanish Socialist Workers Party (PSOE) in 1931, closing her school to pursue a career in politics. She was involved in the foundation of Peasant Houses, linked to the Cantabrian agricultural and livestock world. She also joined the communist and feminist organisation Association of Women against War and Fascism.

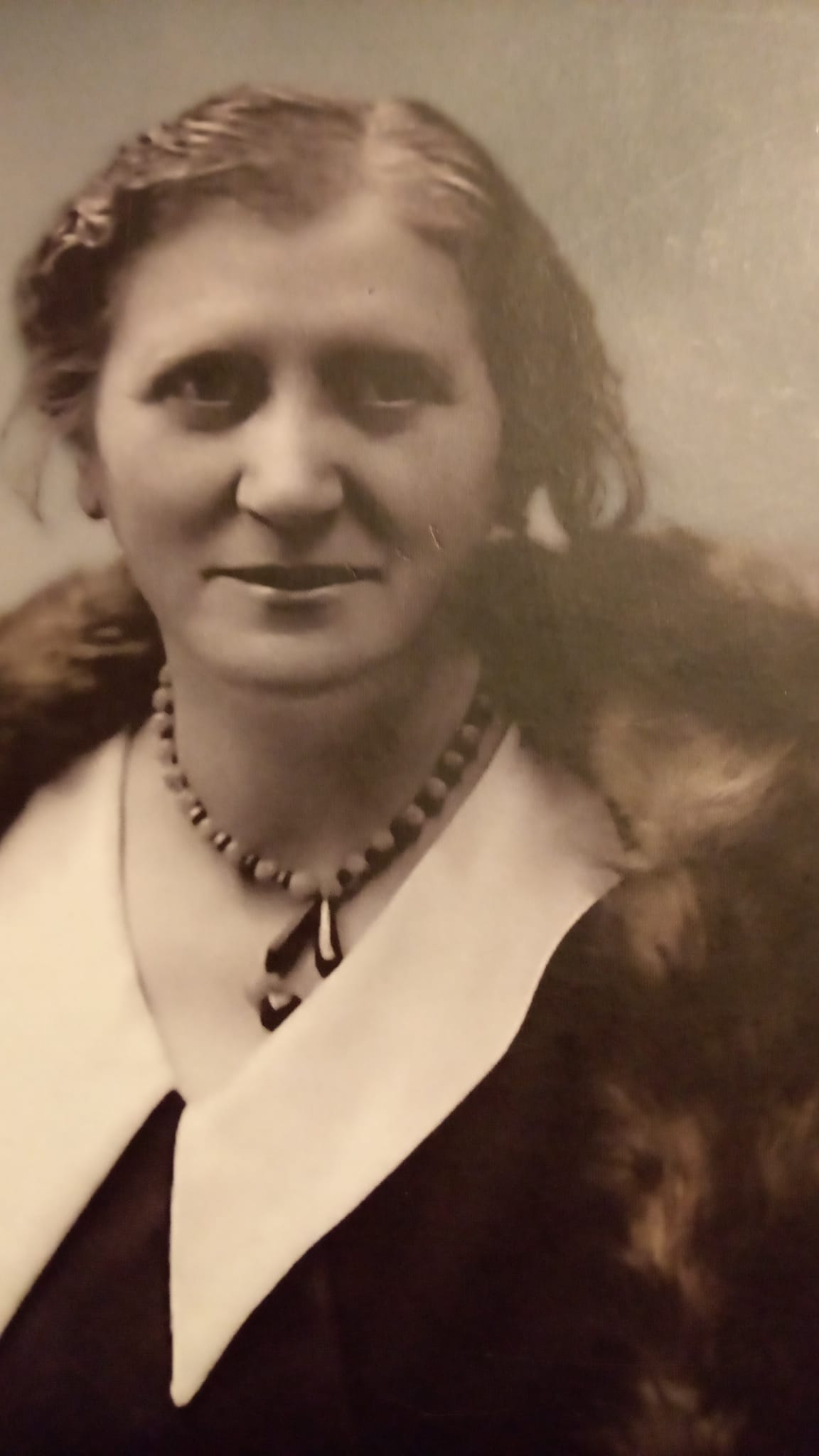
Matilde de la Torre

At the 1933 Spanish general election, de la Torre was elected as Deputy in the Cortes Republicanas (Spanish parliament) representing the Oviedo constituency in Asturias. She was one of five women elected to seats at this election, with the qualification for female members of parliament being a teaching degree. While in parliament, de la Torre supported trade unions and advocated for better treatment for strikers and revolutionaries who were imprisoned after failure of the Revolution of 1934. She called for birth control, abortion and divorce to be available to women. She sat on the Navy Commission.

De la Torre was re-elected to the Cortes Republicanas at the 1936 Spanish general election, narrowly winning with 170,663 votes. In Francisco Largo Caballero's government, de la Torre was appointed general director of Commerce and Tariff Policy. She held this role until May 1937. She was also a member of the Pension, Navy, and National Defence Commissions.

== Life in exile ==
After the defeat of the Republican faction in the Spanish Civil War (1936–1939), de la Torre went into exile, along with Ramón Lamoneda and other politicians. She firstly went into exile in Marseille, France, where she published Seas in the Shadows (1940) about the war in Asturias. She also wrote in Julián Zugazagoitia's magazine Norte, from July 1939, which was an organ of expression for exiled negrinists.

In the spring of 1940, De la Torre embarked for Mexico on the ship Cuba from Bordeaux, France, to continue her exile from Spain. In Mexico, she supported Juan Negrín in his work as president of the Council of Ministers in exile and befriended Emmy Kaemmerer, who was staying at the Hotel Lux.

== Death and legacy ==
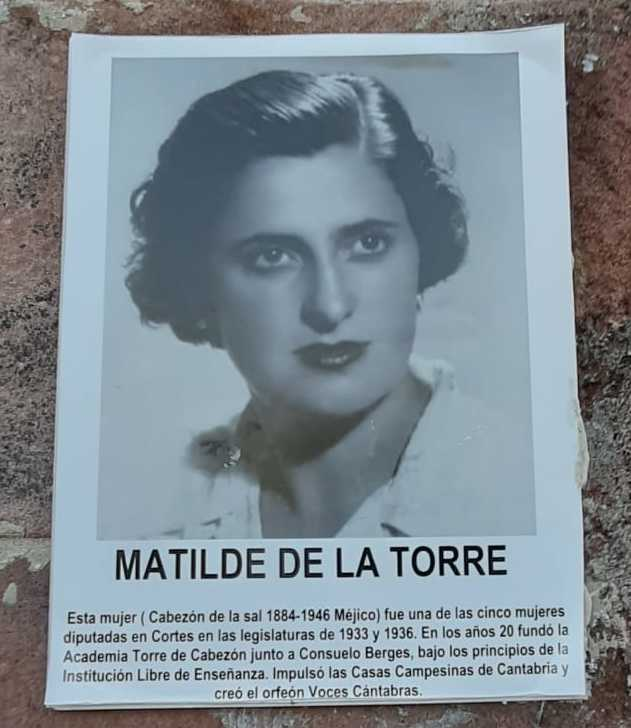
Photograph of de la Torre, published after her death in 1946

De la Torre suffered a period of poor health from 1944. She died while still in exile, on 19 March 1946 in Cuernavaca, Morelos, Mexico, aged 62. She was buried at the Spanish Pantheon in Mexico City.

In March 1984, a speech in memory of d e la Torre was given in Santillana del Mar, Spain. A portrait of her was painted by Eduardo Estrada in 2003.

De la Torre was one of the 36 militants expelled from the PSOE through a note published in El Socialista on 23 April 1946. After a proposal by the Federation of the Canary Islands, the expelled members, including de la Torre, were posthumously readmitted into the PSOE at the 37th Federal Congress held on 24 October 2009 in Madrid, Spain.

In 1984, a biography of da la Torre's life, Matilde de la Torre y su época by C. Calderón Gutiérrez was published. In 2022, a biography of de la Torre's life, Matilde de la Torre: Sex, Socialism and Suffrage in Republican Spain by Deborah Madden was published for the Modern Humanities Research Association's Studies in Hispanic and Lusophone Cultures series.
