= Sant Boi de Llobregat =

- Municipality
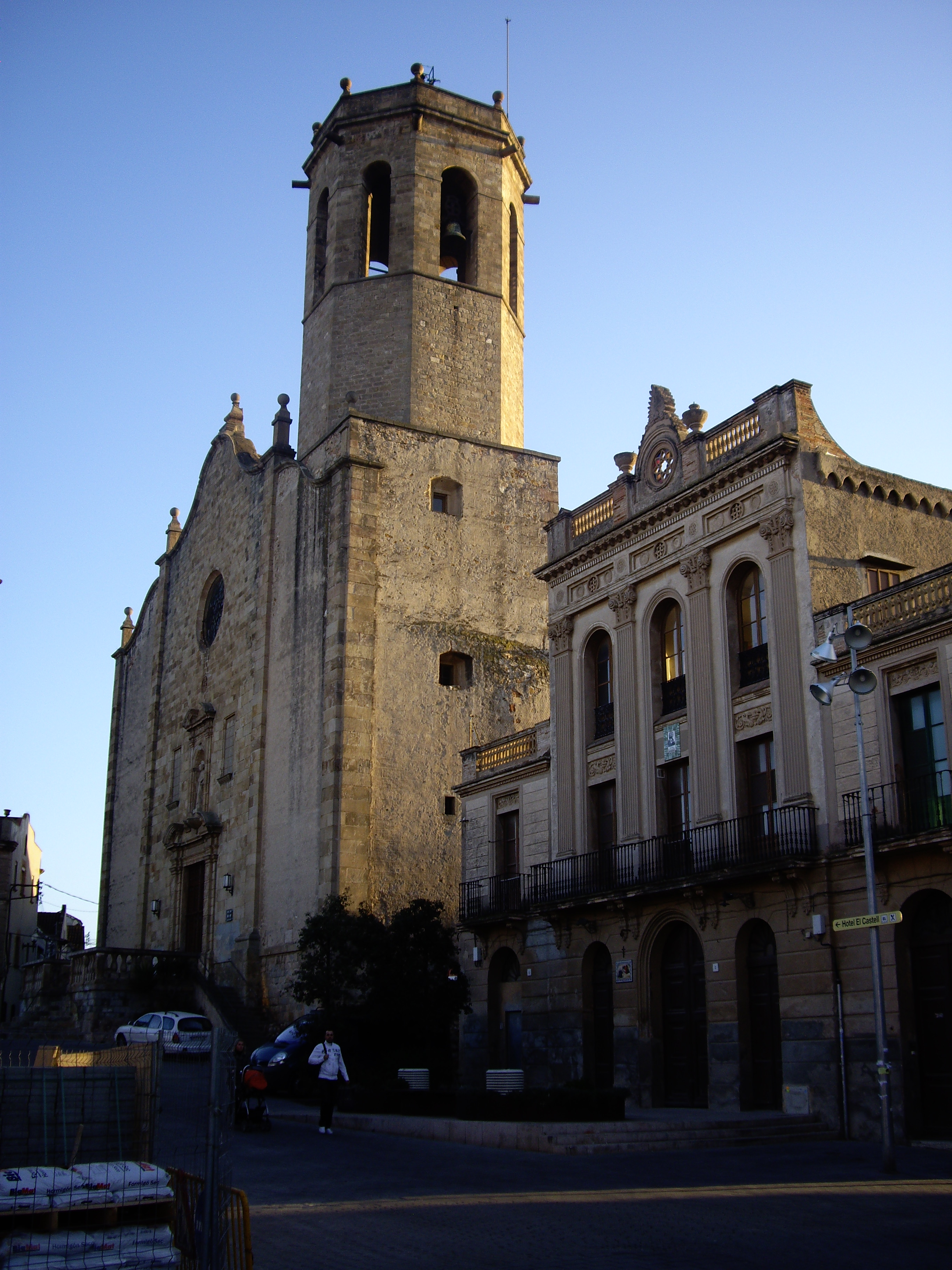
- Parish of St. Baldiri

- Flag Coat of arms

- Location within Catalonia Location within Spain
- Coordinates: 41.336°N 2.043°E
- Country: Spain
- Community: Catalonia
- Province: Barcelona
- Comarca: Baix Llobregat

Government
  - Mayor: Lluïsa Moret (PSC, 2014)

Area
  - Total: 21.5 km^{2} (8.3 sq mi)

Population (2025-01-01)
  - Total: 85,610
  - Density: 3,980/km^{2} (10,300/sq mi)
- Demonym: Santboià/-na
- Website: santboi.cat

Sant Boi de Llobregat (IPA: [ˌsam ˈbɔj ðə ʎuβɾəˈɣat]) is a city in the Province of Barcelona in Catalonia, Spain, located on the banks of the Llobregat river. In 2019 it had 83,605 inhabitants.

The city is divided into six neighborhoods (named barris in Catalan): Ciutat Cooperativa-Molí Nou, Marianao-Can Paulet, Barri Centre, Vinyets-Molí Vell, Camps Blancs-Canons-Orioles, and Casablanca.

It is bordered on the north by the towns of Santa Coloma de Cervelló and Sant Joan Despí and the village of Sant Climent de Llobregat; on the east by the town of Cornellà de Llobregat; on the west by Viladecans; and on the south by El Prat de Llobregat and the Mediterranean Sea (via a narrow southward salient).

== Economy ==
Although the main business activity is trading, which is centered around the service sector, Sant Boi is also known for industrial activities, especially metallurgy. Agriculturally, its mild climate and fertile waterlogged lands, located at the mouth of the Llobregat river, produce a wide variety of vegetables, including the famous Llobregat Delta artichokes. The region offers three different artichoke varieties: white artichoke from Tudela, camús from Bretagne (considered to be the largest variety) and artichoke from Benicarló. Production is concentrated mostly in March, but products can be found in local markets throughout the year.

== Politics ==
The mayor of the town is Lluïsa Moret (Socialists' Party of Catalonia, PSC), and the political composition of the city council seats is as follows:

Government: Socialists' Party of Catalonia (PSC): 16, Sant Boi En Comú Podem - Confluence: 1
Opposition: Republican Left of Catalonia - Municipal Agreement (ERC-AM): 3, People's Party (PP): 2, Vox: 2, Podem: 1

In the 2023-2027 legislature, Comuns and Podem had a common candidacy. However, in 2025, due to several political discrepances and controversies, the representative of Podem was kicked out of the coalition and the government.

== History ==
The finding of archaeological remains corresponding to Iberian colonies (VI-I bC) and to the Romans (I-V aC)―a noteworthy Roman bath is located near the river―suggests that Sant Boi was created in pre-Roman times.

As with most of the surrounding lands, from the 8th to the 11th century the town was controlled by the Moors, until their expulsion from Iberia during the Reconquista. The Moors called it Alcalá, which means "castle", due to the existence of a hillock from where the river and the valley were dominated. The town's current name is derived from the name of Saint Baudilus, known as Boi or Baldiri in Catalonia.

During the Middle Ages, the village progressively grew, expanding from the castle's surroundings to adjacent zones. A baroque-style church was built during the 16th century. The growth continued in the following centuries, giving rise to numerous "masies" (typical Catalan agricultural country houses) near the river and fertile lands. By the end of the 19th century, Sant Boi was a village of nearly 5,000 inhabitants, with an economy driven mainly by agriculture.

In the early stages of the 20th century, industry arrived and subsequently flourished in Sant Boi, ranging from brick manufacturing to metalwork. With the end of the Spanish Civil War in 1939, there was a massive influx of immigrants from many different parts of Spain. These new arrivals consisted mostly of people from villages and small towns. They were searching for jobs and career opportunities in the city of Barcelona since it was stimulated by the regrowth of Catalan industry in post-war Spain.

The population rose from 10,000 people in 1940 to 65,000 in 1975. This period is characterized by the construction of complete quarters (Casablanca, Camps Blancs, and Cooperativa) for the housing of immigrants. Sant Boi is now a town with more than 80,000 inhabitants, with well-established industrial and service sectors, and good cultural and recreational offerings.

=== Demography ===
1900	1930	1950	1970	1986	2019
5,311	8,867	10,811	50,051	75,789	83,605

== Notable places ==
- Sant Baldiri's Church
- Roman Bathhouses
- Sant Ramon Hermitage

== Sport ==
The town has a rugby union club (UE Santboiana), and a football club (FC Santboià).

== Prominent people from Sant Boi ==
- Sergio Aguza – footballer
- Carlos Casquero – former footballer
- Pau Gasol – NBA player (San Antonio Spurs)
- Marc Gasol – NBA player (Toronto Raptors)
  - Both Gasol brothers were actually born in Barcelona, at the hospital where their parents worked. The family moved from another Barcelona suburb, Cornellà, to Sant Boi when Pau was 6 years old and Marc was a year old.
- Oriol Ripol – professional rugby player
- Manel Esteller – scientist
- Toni Ribas – pornographic actor and director
