= Casa Serra =

Coordinates: 41°23′44.5″N 2°09′28″E

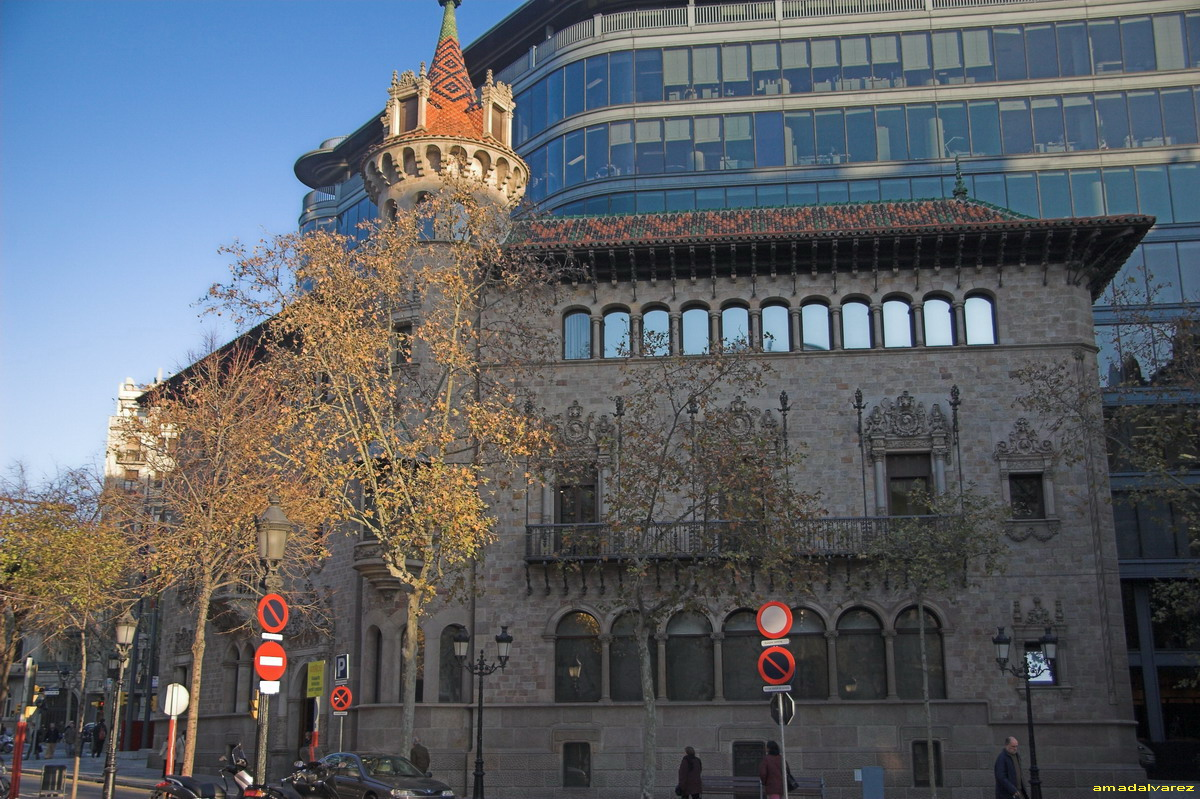
- Frontage of the Casa Serra, with the 1980s office block behind
- Interactive map of the Casa Serra area

General information
- Location: Barcelona, Spain
- Owner: Provincial Deputation of Barcelona

Spanish Cultural Heritage
- Type: Non-movable
- Criteria: Monument
- Designated: 6 March 2001
- Reference no.: RI-51-0010611

The Casa Serra (Serra House) is a building in the Modernisme style in Barcelona, designed by Josep Puig i Cadafalch. It is situated at number 126 Rambla de Catalunya, at that street's corner with the Avinguda Diagonal.

The building was built as a residence between 1903 and 1908, for Pere Serra, although he never actually lived there. It has subsequently served several purposes, and is now the home of the Provincial Deputation of Barcelona.

The section of the building fronting Avinguda Diagonal was demolished in 1981, and replaced by an office building, by Federico Correa and Alfonso Milá, to house the offices of the provincial council (1987). The contrast between the two very different styles was the subject of controversy at the time.

== See also ==
- List of Modernisme buildings in Barcelona
