= Joan Capdevila i Esteve =

Spanish veterinarian and politician

Joan Capdevila i Esteve MP
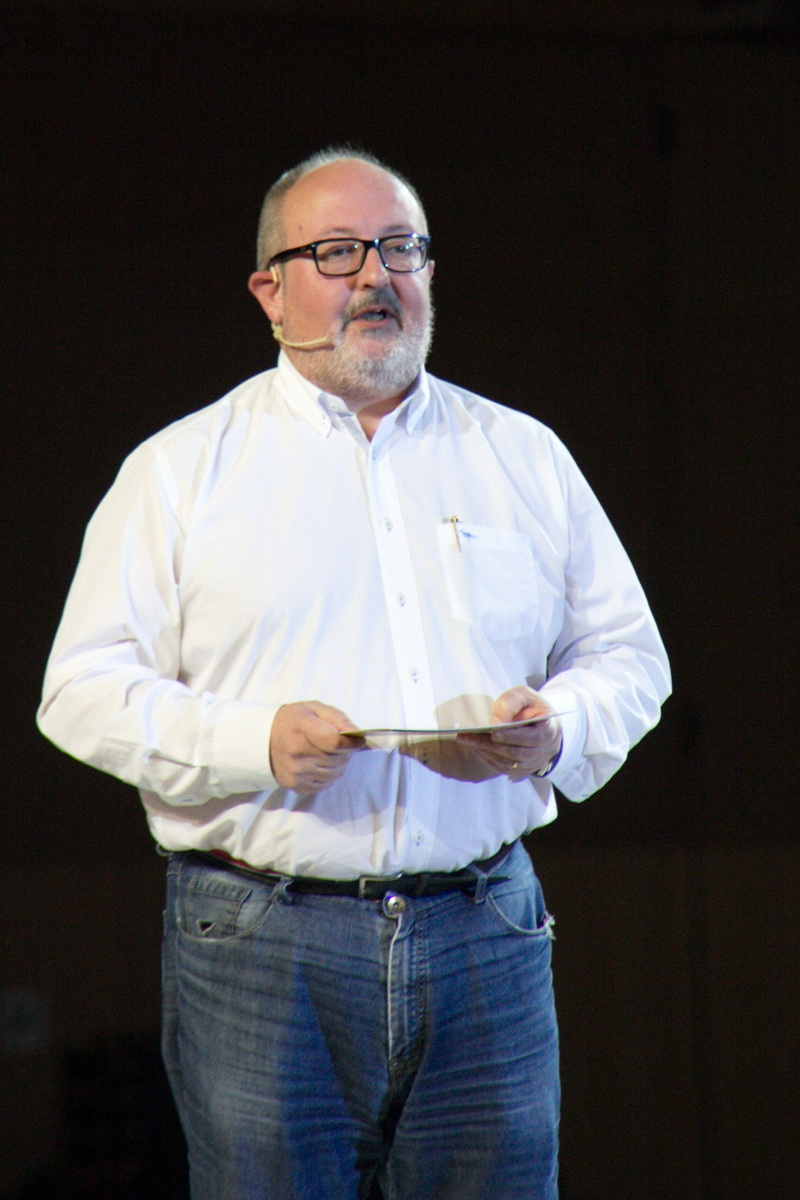
- Capdevila in March 2017

Delegate of the Catalan Government to Madrid
- In office 6 September 2023 – 4 September 2024
- President: Pere Aragonès
- Preceded by: Ester Capella
- Succeeded by: Núria Marín

Member of the Congress of Deputies
- In office 11 January 2016 – 18 February 2020
- Constituency: Barcelona

Personal details
- Born: 12 July 1965 (age 61) Martorell, Catalonia, Spain
- Party: Independent
- Other political affiliations: Republican Left of Catalonia–Sovereigntists
- Education: University of Extremadura; Autonomous University of Barcelona
- Occupation: Veterinarian

Joan Capdevila i Esteve (born 12 July 1965) is a Spanish veterinarian and former politician from Catalonia who served as Member of the Congress of Deputies of Spain and as chair of the Congress' Committee on Industry, Trade and Tourism.

== Early life ==
Capdevila was born on 12 July 1965 in Martorell, Catalonia. He has a degree in veterinary medicine from the University of Extremadura and a master's degree from the Autonomous University of Barcelona.

== Career ==
Capdevila is a veterinarian. He was one of the founders and the first director of the El Matí Digital online newspaper.

Capdevila is Christian democrat and was a member of the Democratic Union of Catalonia until 2009 when he left the party after disagreeing with the leadership of Josep Antoni Duran i Lleida.

Capdevila contested the 2015 general election as an independent Republican Left of Catalonia–Catalonia Yes (ERC–CatSí) electoral alliance candidate in the Province of Barcelona and was elected to the Congress of Deputies. He was re-elected at the 2016 and 2019 general elections.

== Personal life ==
Capdevila is married and has a daughter and a son.

== Electoral history ==
Electoral history of Joan Capdevila i Esteve
Election	Constituency	Party	Alliance	No.	Result
2015 general	Province of Barcelona	Independent	Republican Left of Catalonia–Catalonia Yes	5	Elected
2016 general	Province of Barcelona	Independent	Republican Left of Catalonia–Catalonia Yes	5	Elected
2019 general	Province of Barcelona	Independent	Republican Left of Catalonia–Sovereigntists	8	Elected
