= Mercè Perea =

Spanish politician

María Mercè Perea i Conillas (born 22 November 1966) is a Spanish Socialist Workers' Party (PSOE) politician. She was elected to the Congress of Deputies in the 2015 election.

== Biography ==
Perea was born in L'Hospitalet de Llobregat in the Barcelona metropolitan area, and her father was the writer Pedro Perea Hernández. She graduated with a law degree from the University of Bologna in Italy. As of 2023, she is married and has two daughters and a son. She was elected to the city council in her home town in 2007, and was re-elected twice before resigning due to being elected to the Congress of Deputies; she was replaced in the council by David Quirós.

Third on the Socialists' Party of Catalonia (PSC) list in the Barcelona constituency in the 2015 Spanish general election, Perea was elected to Congress. After the 2016 election, she was one of 15 PSOE deputies to vote against the investiture of Mariano Rajoy as the prime minister of Spain; this included all seven from Catalonia.

In 2021, Perea wrote that the 2017 Catalan independence referendum and the Catalan declaration of independence were illegal, but that the reaction from Rajoy's government in sending in the security forces "provoked greater confrontation". She supported new PSOE prime minister Pedro Sánchez's decision to pardon the leaders of the referendum as a way to move on.
