= Lluïsa Moret =

Spanish politician (born 1965)

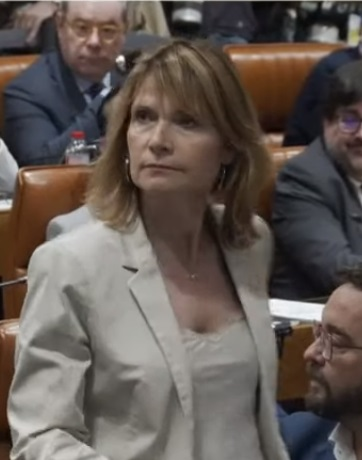

Lluïsa Moret Sabidó (born 1965) is a Spanish politician of the Socialists' Party of Catalonia (PSC). She was elected to the council in Sant Boi de Llobregat in 2007 and became mayor in 2014. In 2023 she was elected president of the Provincial Deputation of Barcelona, and the following year deputy first minister of the PSC.

== Biography ==
Moret was born in Barbastro in Aragon to a rural family. In 1989, she began working for the town council in Sant Boi de Llobregat in Catalonia. She was elected to the council in 2007. In May 2014, she succeeded Jaume Bosch i Pugès as mayor upon his resignation, being elected by the incumbent coalition government of the Socialists' Party of Catalonia (PSC) and ICV–EUiA. The two parties maintained their governing status in the town after the 2015 elections.

In the 2019 Spanish local elections, the PSC won 13 of 25 seats and governed in majority with Moret as mayor. This was extended to 16 out of 25 seats four years later.

Having been the Provincial Deputation of Barcelona's delegated president for social cohesion, citizenship and wellbeing in 2019–2023, Moret was voted the body's president in July 2023. Her bid was backed by the PSC, with support from En Comú Podem, Tot per Terrassa and two dissidents from Together for Catalonia.

In December 2021, the PSC established its new executive with Miquel Iceta as president and Salvador Illa as first secretary, with Moret one of his five deputies. In March 2024, she became the sole holder of the same position.
