= Loretta Napoleoni =

Italian journalist and political analyst (born 1955)

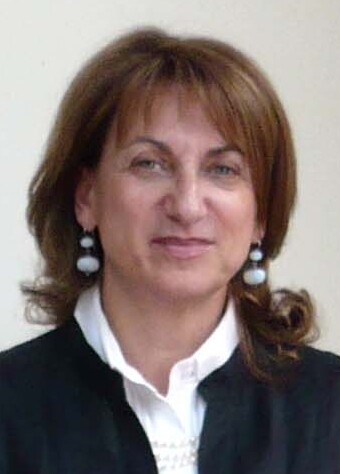
- Occupations: author; journalist; political analyst

Loretta Napoleoni (born 1955) is an Italian journalist and political analyst. She reports on the financing of terrorism, connected finance, and security related topics.

== Early life and education ==
Napoleoni was born in Rome in 1955. She studied at Sapienza University, Rome. She holds a MPhil in International Relations and an MA in Terrorism studies from the London School of Economics (LSE). She studied as a Fulbright scholar at the Paul H. Nitze School of Advanced International Studies (SAIS), Johns Hopkins University in Washington, D.C.She was also a Rotary Scholar at the LSE. A childhood friend was arrested for involvement in the Red Brigades and Napoleoni wrote her PhD on the group.

== Career ==
In the early 1980s, she worked at the National Bank of Hungary on the convertibility of the Hungarian forint. This became the blueprint for the convertibility of the ruble a decade later. She is a member of the scientific committee of the Fundación Ideas para el Progreso, the think tank of Spain's Socialist Party, and she is a partner with Oxfam Italia. Napoleoni's writing has appeared in Italian newspapers such as il Caffè, La Repubblica, and Il Fatto Quotidiano. She has worked as a foreign correspondent and columnist for the Spanish newspaper El Pais.. She is chairperson of the Club de Madrid group studying the financing of terrorism.

== Selected works ==
- — (2003). Modern Jihad: Tracing the Dollars Behind the Terror Networks. London: Pluto Press. ISBN 9780745321172.
- — (2005). Terror Incorporated: Tracing the Dollars Behind the Terror Networks. New York: Seven Stories Press. ISBN 9781583226735.
- — (2010). Terrorism and the Economy: How the War on Terror is Bankrupting the World. New York: Seven Stories Press. ISBN 978-1583228951.
- — (2011). Maonomics: Why Chinese Communists Make Better Capitalists Than We Do. Translated by Stephen Twilley; foreword by Greg Palast. New York: Seven Stories Press. ISBN 9781609804312.
- — (2016). Merchants of Men: How Jihadists and ISIS Turned Kidnapping and Refugee Trafficking into a Multi-Billion Dollar Business. Penguin USA. ISBN 9781609807085.
- — (2024). Technocapitalism: The Rise of the New Robber Barons and the Fight for the Common Good. New York: Seven Stories Press. ISBN 9781644213292.
