= Antoni Dalmau =

Spanish politician (1951–2022)

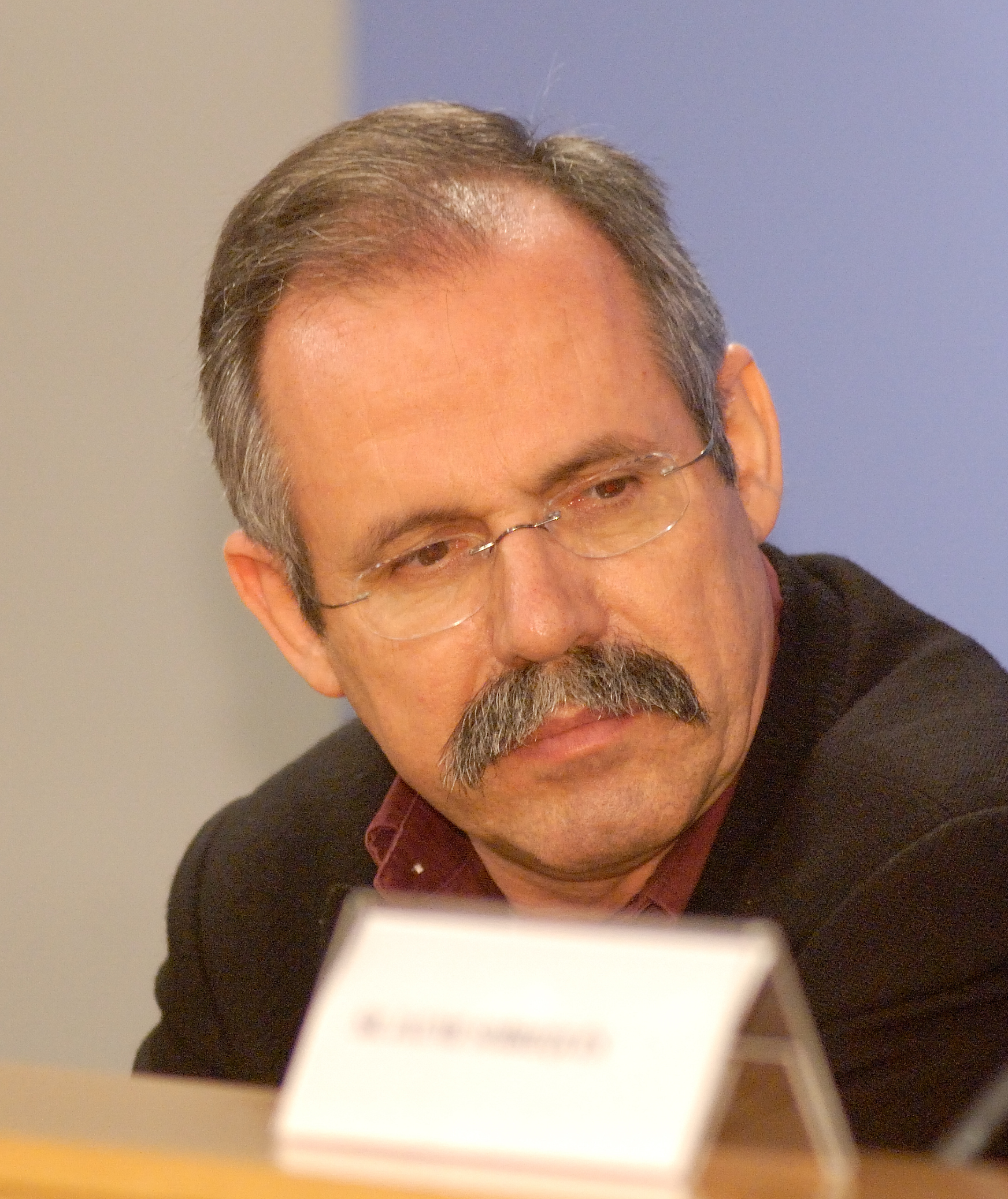
- Dalmau in 2008

Member of the Parliament of Catalonia
- In office 16 June 1988 – 24 August 1999
- Constituency: Barcelona

Member of the City Council of Igualada
- In office 1987–1991

Member of the City Council of Barcelona
- In office 1983–1987

President of the Provincial Deputation of Barcelona
- In office 1982–1987
- Preceded by: Francesc Martí i Jusmet
- Succeeded by: Manel Royes i Vila

Personal details
- Born: Antoni Dalmau i Ribalta; 13 March 1951 Igualada, Spain
- Died: 5 January 2022 (aged 70) Igualada, Spain
- Party: CSC (1975–1976); PSC–C (1976–1978); PSC–PSOE (1978–2013)

Antoni Dalmau i Ribalta (13 March 1951 – 5 January 2022) was a Catalan politician. A member of the Socialists' Party of Catalonia, he served in the Parliament of Catalonia from 1988 to 1999 and was President of the Provincial Deputation of Barcelona from 1982 to 1987. He died on 5 January 2022, at the age of 70.

== Writing and cultural work ==
Alongside his political career, Dalmau worked as a writer, historian and cultural organiser. He published more than twenty books, including novels, political essays and historical studies. His historical research focused particularly on Catharism, the history of Barcelona around the turn of the 20th century, anarchism, political violence and the social movements of Catalonia.

His historical novel Terra d'oblit. El vell camí dels càtars received the first Nèstor Luján Prize for Historical Novel in 1997 and went through numerous editions. He also received the Serra d'Or Critics Award for Pels camins de la història d'Igualada and the Fiter i Rossell novel prize for Primavera d'hivern.

From 1988 to 2013, Dalmau served as president of the Teatre Lliure foundation in Barcelona. He was also the founder and director of the cultural publication Revista d'Igualada.

== Political career ==
Dalmau served as president of the Provincial Deputation of Barcelona from 1982 to 1987. During his presidency, the institution underwent administrative reforms and participated in the transfer of several responsibilities and institutions to the Government of Catalonia. These included the Mossos d'Esquadra, the Cartographic Institute and fire services. The Palau de la Generalitat, which had served as the seat of the provincial government for almost 150 years, was also returned to the Generalitat, while the Biblioteca de Catalunya was restored to the Institute for Catalan Studies.

He later served as a member of the Parliament of Catalonia from 1988 to 1999, including as vice-president of the chamber from 1988 to 1995 and as chairman of its cultural policy committee from 1995 to 1999.
