= Jesús Caldera =

Spanish politician (born 1957)

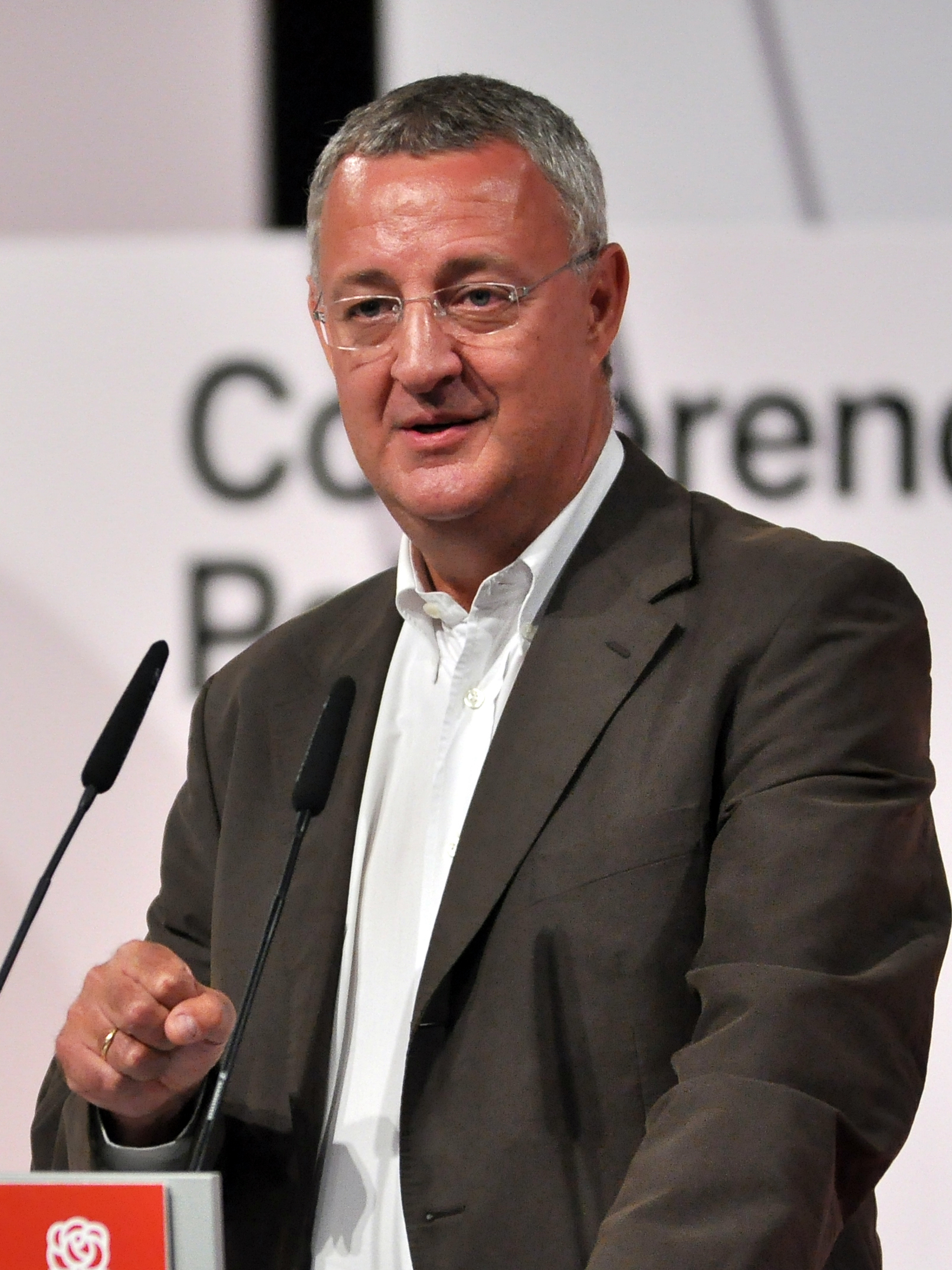

Minister of Labor and Social Issues
- In office 18 April 2004 – 12 April 2008
- Prime Minister: José Luis Rodríguez Zapatero
- Preceded by: Eduardo Zaplana
- Succeeded by: Celestino Corbacho

Leader of the Socialist Group in the Congress of Deputies
- In office 5 September 2000 – 14 March 2004
- Prime Minister: José Luis Rodríguez Zapatero
- Preceded by: Luis Martínez Noval
- Succeeded by: Alfredo Pérez Rubalcaba

Member of the Congress of Deputies
- In office 28 October 1982 – 27 October 2015
- Constituency: Salamanca

Personal details
- Born: Jesús Caldera Sánchez-Capitán; 31 October 1957 (age 68) Béjar, Salamanca, Spain
- Party: PSOE
- Profession: City Manager

Jesús Caldera Sánchez-Capitán (born 31 October 1957 in Béjar, Salamanca) is a Spanish socialist politician. He holds degrees in political science and sociology from the Complutense University of Madrid and a law degree from UNED.He was Minister of Labor during the eighth legislature of the Spanish government (2008-2011).

== Biography ==
Born in Béjar (Salamanca Province) in 1957, Jesús Caldera began his career at the beginning of the 1980s when he joined the public administration as a city manager in the province of Salamanca.

He became a member of the Spanish Congress of Deputies for Salamanca Province in the second legislature (1982). After José Luis Rodríguez Zapatero was elected Secretary General of the Spanish Socialist Workers' Party (PSOE), he was named speaker of the Socialist Group (2000–2004).

In the 37th Congress of the Socialist Workers' Party held in July 2008, Caldera was named Secretary of the Ideas and Programs.

=== Minister of Labour and Social Issues (2004-2008) ===
After the PSOE victory in March 2004, President José Luis Rodríguez Zapatero entrusted Caldera with one of the most important responsibilities within the executive committee: to lead the Ministry of Labor and Social Issues, an office he assumed on 18 April 2004. Caldera signed over twenty social and labor agreements while leading this ministry.

Key labor reforms: Caldera raised the minimum wage to 600 euros/month, built consensus with social agents for labor reform as well as social security that allowed for the creation of more jobs with permanent contracts and improved payments to the neediest groups, at the same time he guaranteed the future of the system by making early retirement more difficult. Additionally, he brought forward the independent contractors statute and put a plan in place to reduce workplace accidents.

Key social reforms: Caldera created a new right, the right of dependent people to get assistance, raised paternity leave days from four to fifteen. Further, his ministry was charged with migratory policies and (along with social agents) to regularize more than half a million immigrants.

== Ideas Foundation for Progress ==
After Caldera left the Ministry of Labor in April 2008, it was announced that his new challenge was to create, put in motion and preside over a large think tank, the IDEAS Foundation for progress that would unite the smaller foundations tied to the PSOE.

This foundation's mission would be to create new ideas and projects for the party with the objective of staying abreast of social change and offering up to date solutions.

Political offices
Preceded by Eduardo Zaplana	Minister of Labor and Social Issues; 2004–2008	Succeeded by Celestino Corbacho
Party political offices
Preceded by Luis Martínez Noval	Leader of the Socialist Group in the Congress of Deputies; 2000–2004	Succeeded by Alfredo Pérez Rubalcaba
