= Núria Marín =

Spanish politician

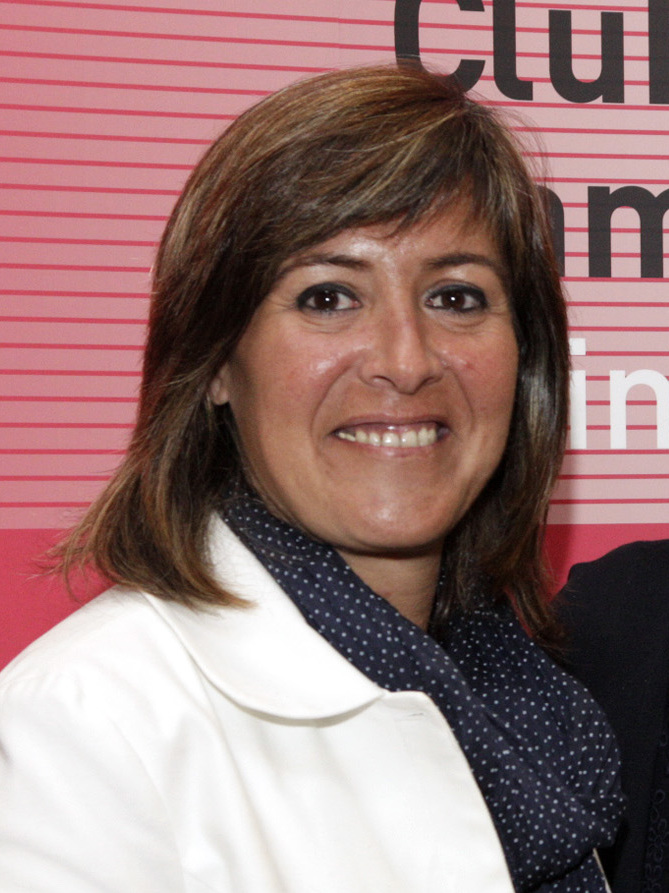
- Marín in 2012

Delegate of the Catalan Government to Madrid
- Incumbent
- Assumed office 4 September 2024
- President: Salvador Illa
- Preceded by: Joan Capdevila i Esteve

Mayor of L'Hospitalet de Llobregat
- In office 19 April 2008 – 15 June 2024
- Preceded by: Celestino Corbacho
- Succeeded by: David Quirós

Member of the Senate
- In office 17 August 2023 – 3 September 2024
- Appointed by: Parliament of Catalonia
- Constituency: Catalonia

President of the Provincial Deputation of Barcelona
- In office 11 July 2019 – 13 July 2023
- Preceded by: Marc Castells
- Succeeded by: Lluïsa Moret
Municipal offices
Member of the Provincial Deputation of Barcelona
In office
15 July 2011 – 12 July 2023
Member of L'Hospitalet de Llobregat City Council
In office
17 June 1995 – 15 June 2024
Party offices
President of the Socialists' Party of Catalonia
In office 15 December 2019 – 19 December 2021
Preceded by	Àngel Ros
Succeeded by	Miquel Iceta

Personal details
- Born: 26 December 1963 (age 62) L'Hospitalet de Llobregat, Spain
- Party: Socialists' Party of Catalonia

Núria Marín Martínez (born 26 December 1963) is a Spanish politician of the Socialists' Party of Catalonia (PSC). She was a city councillor in Catalonia's second largest city, L'Hospitalet de Llobregat, from 1995 to 2024 and its mayor from 2008 to 2024.

Marín was President of the Provincial Deputation of Barcelona from 2019 to 2023, leaving when named to the Senate of Spain. She was her party's president 2019 to 2021.

== Local politics ==
Marín became mayor Celestino Corbacho's first deputy in 2007. When he resigned the following year to become Minister of Work and Immigration, she was elected as his successor, with 18 votes out of 25. She became L'Hospitalet de Llobregat's third mayor since the Spanish transition to democracy, and the first woman in the office.

In the 2011 Spanish local elections, the PSC lost the overall majority it had held in the city since 1983, falling from 17 to 13 of 27 seats. She was invested as mayor after forming a pact with the two councillors from the Initiative for Catalonia Greens-United and Alternative Left (ICV-EUiA). Marín said that the issues for her new mandate were the Spanish economic crisis and the entrance into the city hall of the far-right Platform for Catalonia.

The PSC under Marín fell further to 11 of 27 seats in the 2015 Spanish local elections. In November that year, she formed a pact with two independent councillors elected as members of Guanyem Catalunya, still one short of a majority.

In 2017, following the presentation of the unrecognised Catalan declaration of independence, Marín called for Carles Puigdemont, the President of the Government of Catalonia, to confirm that he was not seeking secession, as to avoid the application of Article 155 of the Constitution of Spain being triggered. She reiterated the PSC's support for dialogue and federalism, and praised international businesses for moving their operations from Catalonia in anticipation of secession: "Businesses generate wealth. 500 companies moving is very bad news. If many businesses had reacted earlier, perhaps we wouldn't have got to this point".

In the 2019 Spanish local elections, Marín recovered the majority in the city hall that her party had lost eight years earlier, by increasing their seats from 11 to 14 out of 27.

Marín was arrested and bailed in December 2020 for alleged diversion of funds. The case against her was closed in July 2022. In the 2023 Spanish local elections, her party was the most voted in each neighbourhood of L'Hospitalet de Llobregat, but nonetheless lost its majority.

On 22 May 2024, Marín announced that she would leave the mayor's office on 15 June. David Quirós would become the next mayor.

== Other offices ==
In 2011, she was elected to the Provincial Deputation of Barcelona, and resigned in December 2014 to concentrate on her role as mayor. In July 2019, she was invested as President of the Provincial Deputation, with the deputies from her party and Together for Catalonia voting in favour. That November, she was elected President of the Serra de Collserola Natural Park consortium.

In 2017, Marín was elected to one of three seats held by the Socialists' Party of Catalonia (PSC) in the executive of the Spanish Socialist Workers' Party (PSOE). Formerly vice secretary to PSC leader Miquel Iceta, she replaced Àngel Ros as party president in December 2019. Two years later, new secretary general Salvador Illa installed Iceta as president, with Marín as vice president.

Marín left the Provincial Deputation in 2023 to be named Senator by the Parliament of Catalonia. In September 2024, Illa named her as the Catalan government's delegate to Madrid.
