= Provincial Deputation of Barcelona =

Government institution in Spain

Provincial Deputation of Barcelona Diputació de Barcelona (Catalan) Diputación de Barcelona (Spanish)
- Coat of arms

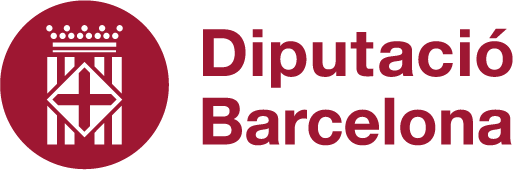
- Logo

Type
- Type: Provincial Deputation of the Province of Barcelona

History
- Founded: 1822
- Disbanded: 1931–1939

Leadership
- President: Lluïsa Moret, PSC

Structure
- Seats: 51
- Political groups: Government (35): PSC (17); ERC (11); ECP–C (5); Junts (2); Confidence and supply (1): TxT (1); Opposition (15): Junts (10); PP (4); Vox (1)
- Length of term: 4 years

Elections
- Voting system: Indirect election (from the local election results, elected by proportional representation in electoral judicial districts (single or multi-member, according to population)
- Last election: 28 May 2023
- Next election: 2027

Meeting place
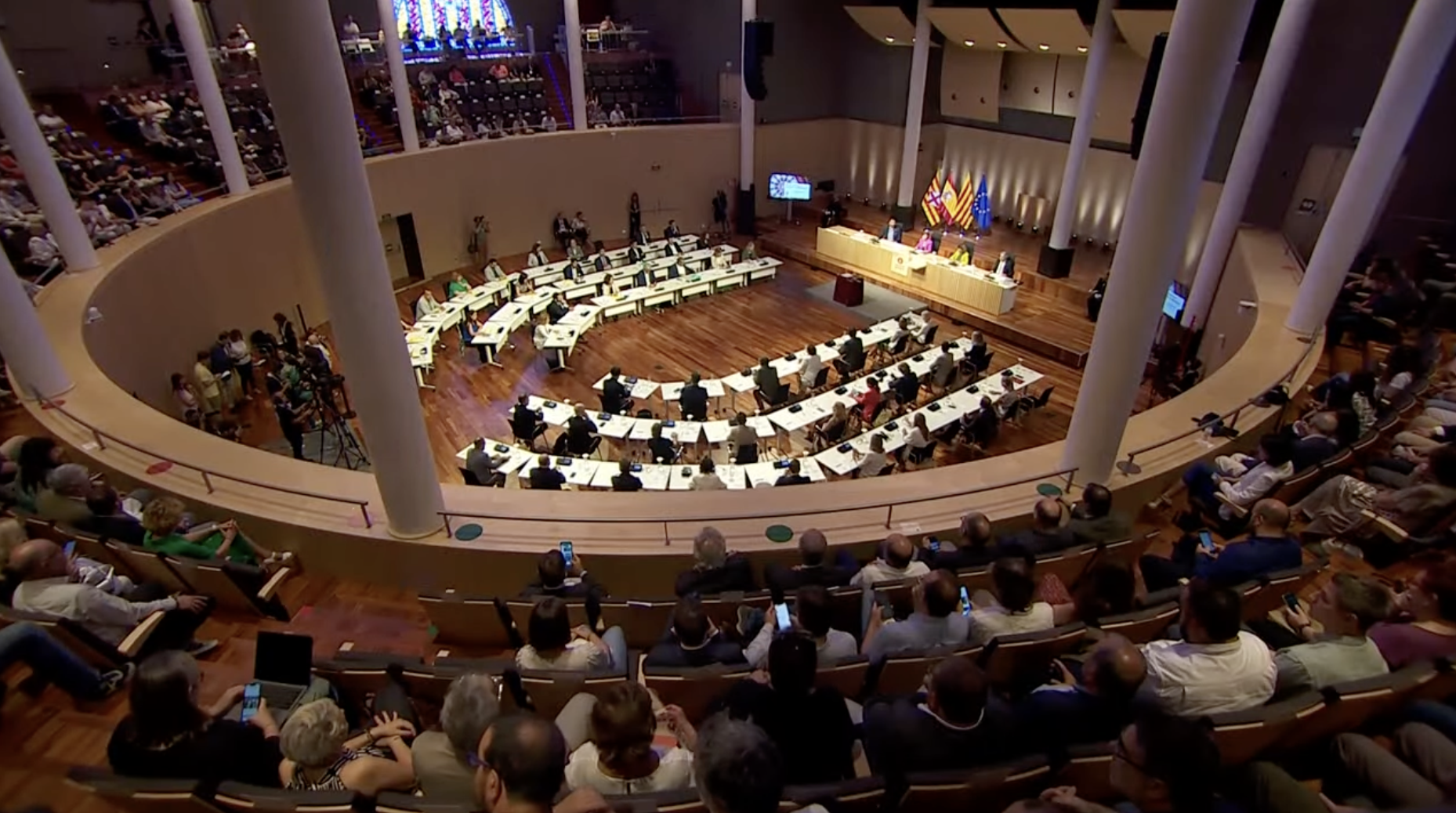
- Paranimf de l'Escola Industrial, Eixample, Barcelona (since 2021); Casa Serra, Eixample, Barcelona (formerly)
- Provincial Deputation of Barcelona

Agency overview
- Employees: 4,483
- Annual budget: €1.24 billion
- Website: https://www.diba.cat/

The Provincial Deputation of Barcelona (Catalan: Diputació de Barcelona; Spanish: Diputación de Barcelona) is the local government body charged with the government and administration of the province of Barcelona, Catalonia, Spain.

Being the biggest provincial deputation in Spain, it is the third biggest public institution in Catalonia after the Generalitat and the Barcelona City Council, managing a yearly budget around €1 billion. As is the case for all provincial councils, the Council is indirectly elected, based on the results of the municipal elections in the province. The president is elected among the Council's members meet for the inaugural session after the municipal elections.

The Council's headquarters is the Casa Serra, on the Rambla de Catalunya.

== Composition ==
Key to parties CUP PSUC ICV ICV–EUiA–EPM BComú–E (Entesa) ECG ECP–C ERC TxT PSC JxCat Junts CC–UCD CiU Cs PP AP Vox
Election	Distribution
1979	12 / 17 / 3 / 19
1983	7 / 26 / 15 / 3
1987	6 / 24 / 20 / 1
1991	6 / 24 / 19 / 2
1995	6 / 1 / 22 / 18 / 4
1999	3 / 1 / 30 / 13 / 4
2003	7 / 2 / 25 / 12 / 5
2007	4 / 2 / 25 / 16 / 4
2011	4 / 2 / 19 / 20 / 6
2015	3 / 7 / 11 / 10 / 14 / 3 / 3
2019	5 / 16 / 1 / 16 / 7 / 4 / 2
2023	5 / 11 / 1 / 17 / 12 / 4 / 1

Barcelona province 25 judicial districts which serve as the basis for the 14 deputation constituencies (Catalan: partit judicial electoral, Spanish: partido judicial electoral) albeit many modified or merged together. Deputies elected are always directly-elected municipal councilors (mayors included).

== Presidents ==
List of presidents of the Provincial Deputation of Barcelona.

Portrait	Office holder	Start	End
	Enric Prat de la Riba i Sarrà	1907	1917
	Joan Vallès i Pujals	1917	1924
	José Enrique de Olano y Loyzaga	1924	1925
	Alfons Sala i Argemí	1925	1925
	Gaietà Marfà i Clivilles	1925	1925
	Josep Maria Milà i Camps	1925	1930
	Joan Maluquer i Viladot	1930	1931
	Josep Maria Milà i Camps	1939	1939
	Antoni Maria Simarro i Puig	1939	1943
	Luis Argemí y de Martí	1943	1946
	Antoni Maria Llopis Galofré	1946	1949
	Joaquim Buxó Dulce d'Abaigar	1949	1967
	Josep Maria de Muller i d'Abadal	1967	1973
	Joan Antoni Samaranch i Torelló	1973	1977
	Josep Tarradellas i Joan	1977	1980
	Francesc Martí i Jusmet	April 1980	1982
	Antoni Dalmau i Ribalta	1982	1987
	Manel Royes i Vila	1987	2003
	José Montilla i Aguilera	2003	2004
	Celestino Corbacho Chaves	2004	2008
	Antoni Fogué i Moya	2008	2011
	Salvador Esteve i Figueras	2011	2015
	Mercè Conesa i Pagès	2015	2018
sense marc	Marc Castells i Berzosa	2018	2019
sense marc	Núria Marín Martínez	2019	2023
sense marc	Lluïsa Moret Sabidó	2023	In office

== Buildings ==
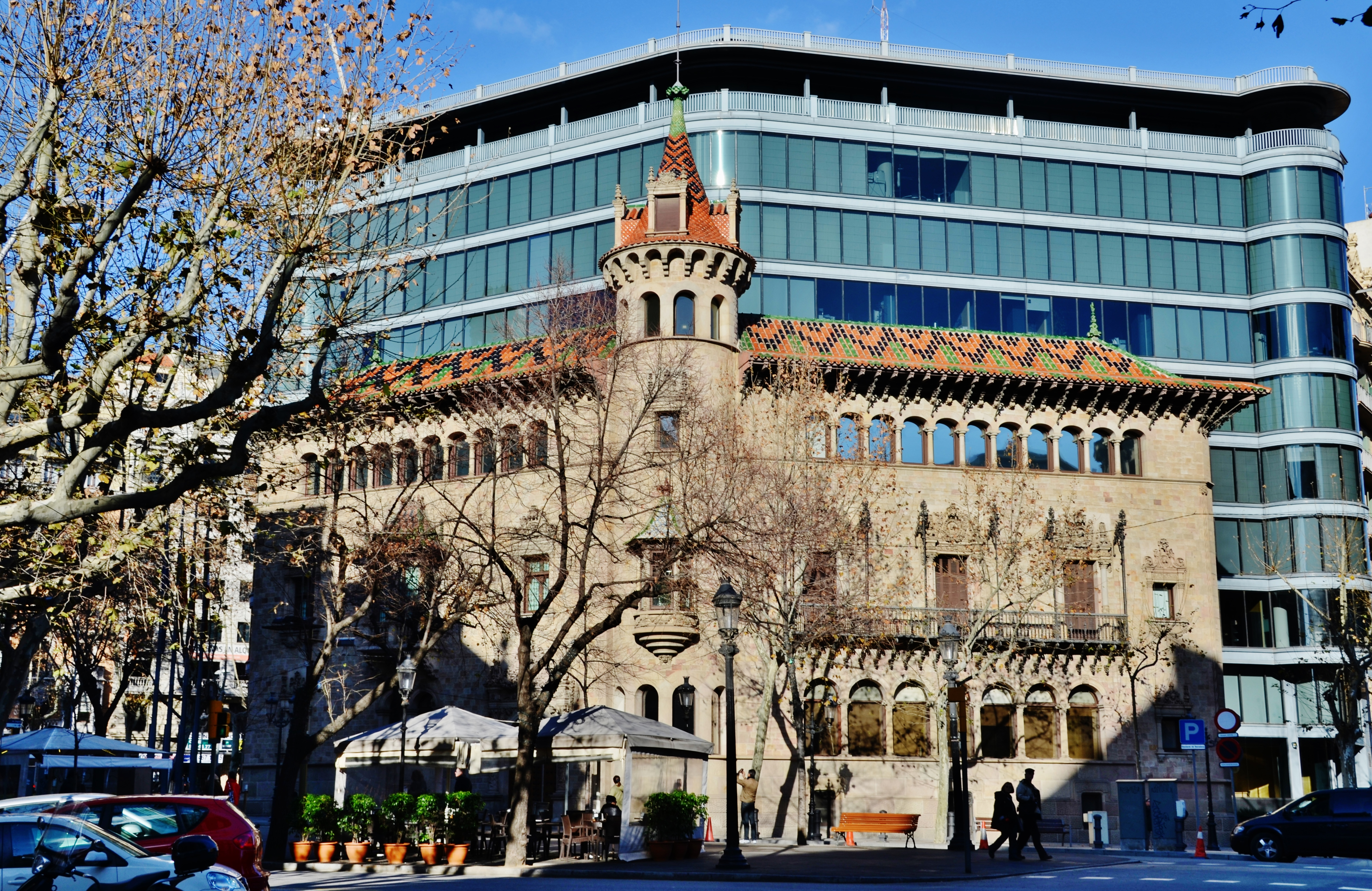
Casa Serra

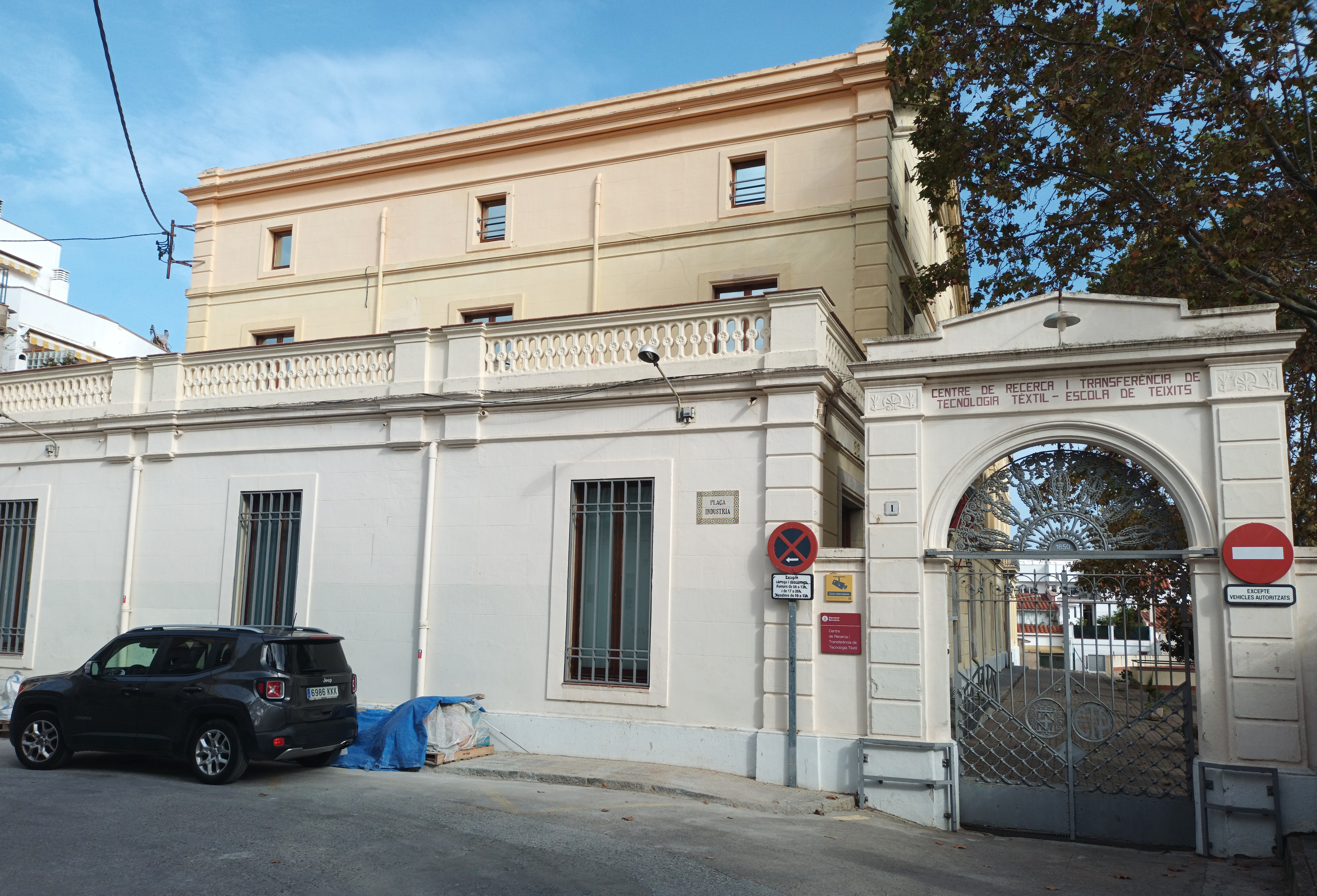
Canet de Mar Weaving School (Escola de Teixits de Canet de Mar)

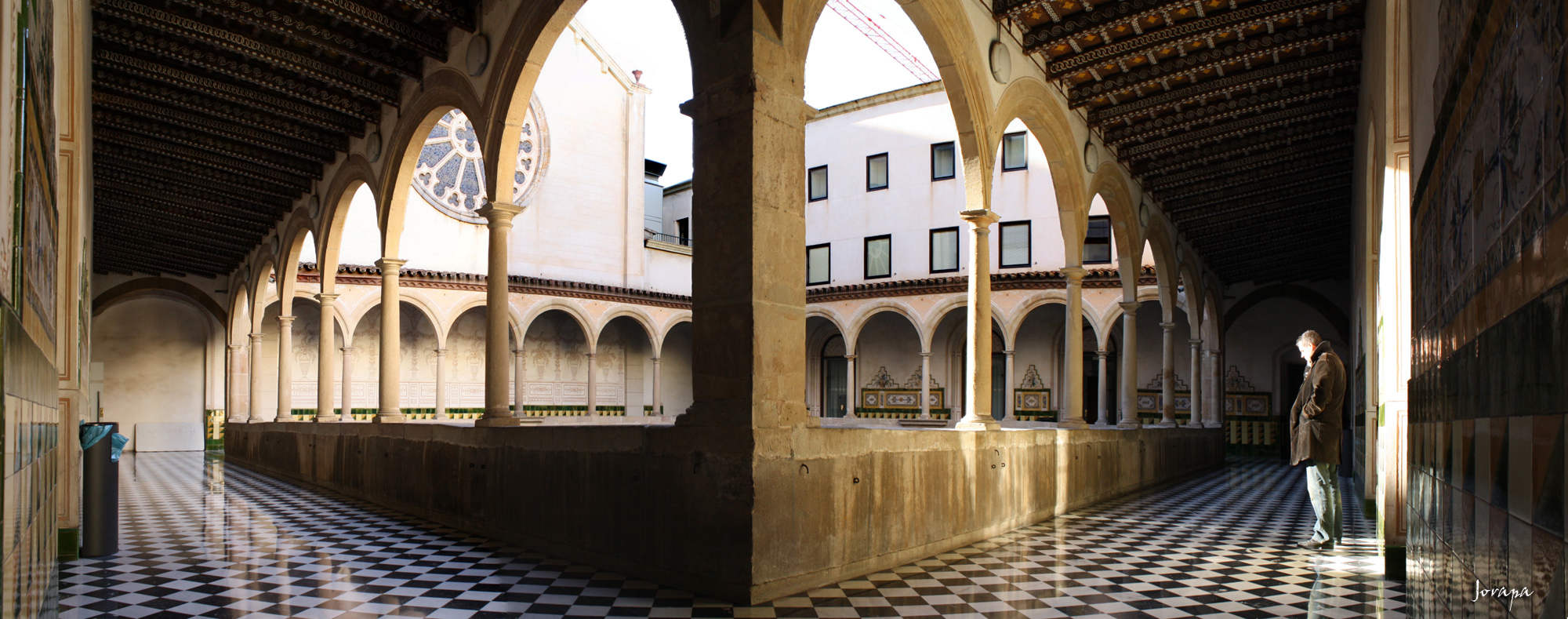
House of Charity (Casa de la Caritat), currently hosting the CCCB arts center

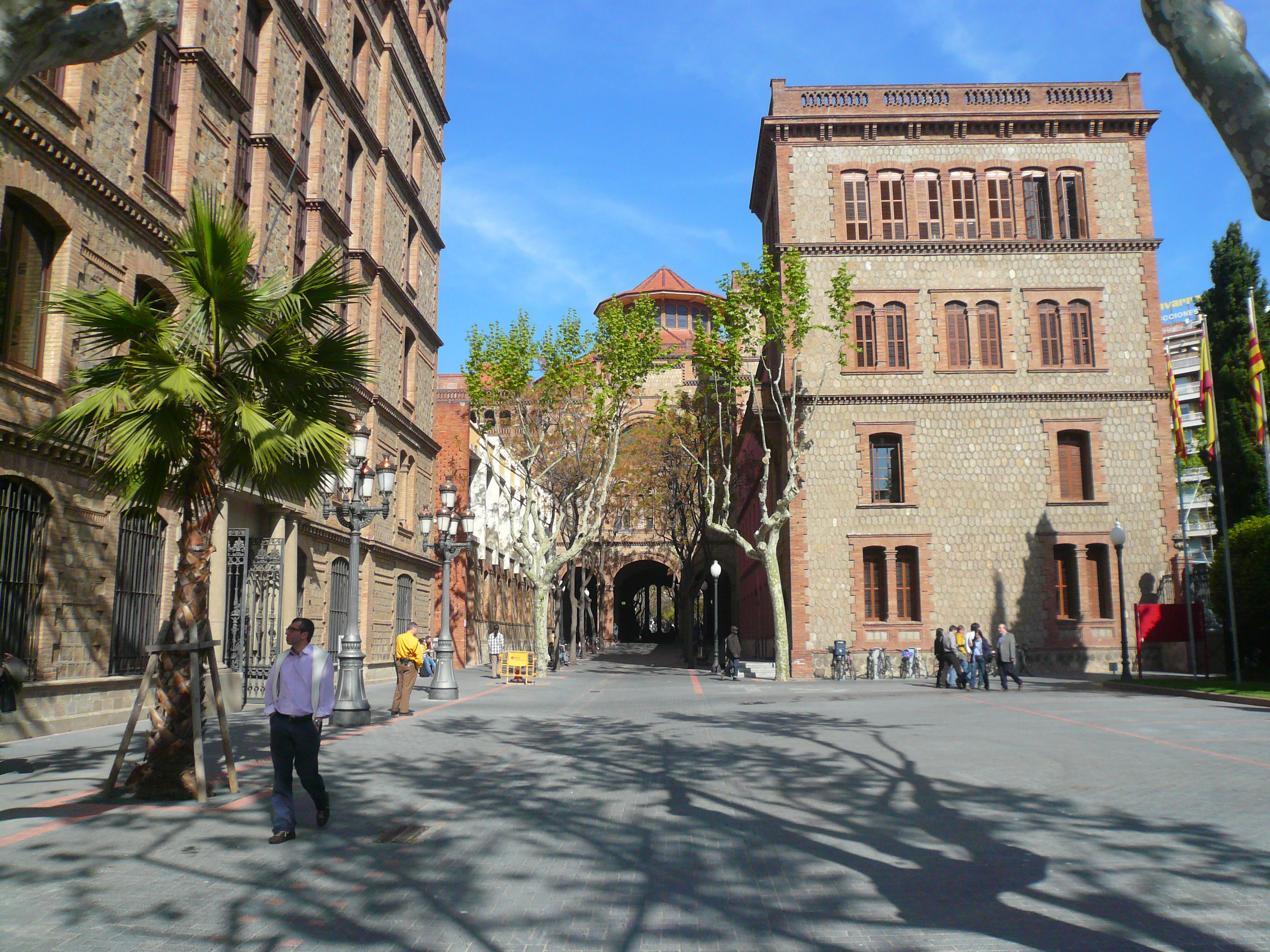
Industrial School (Escola Industrial)

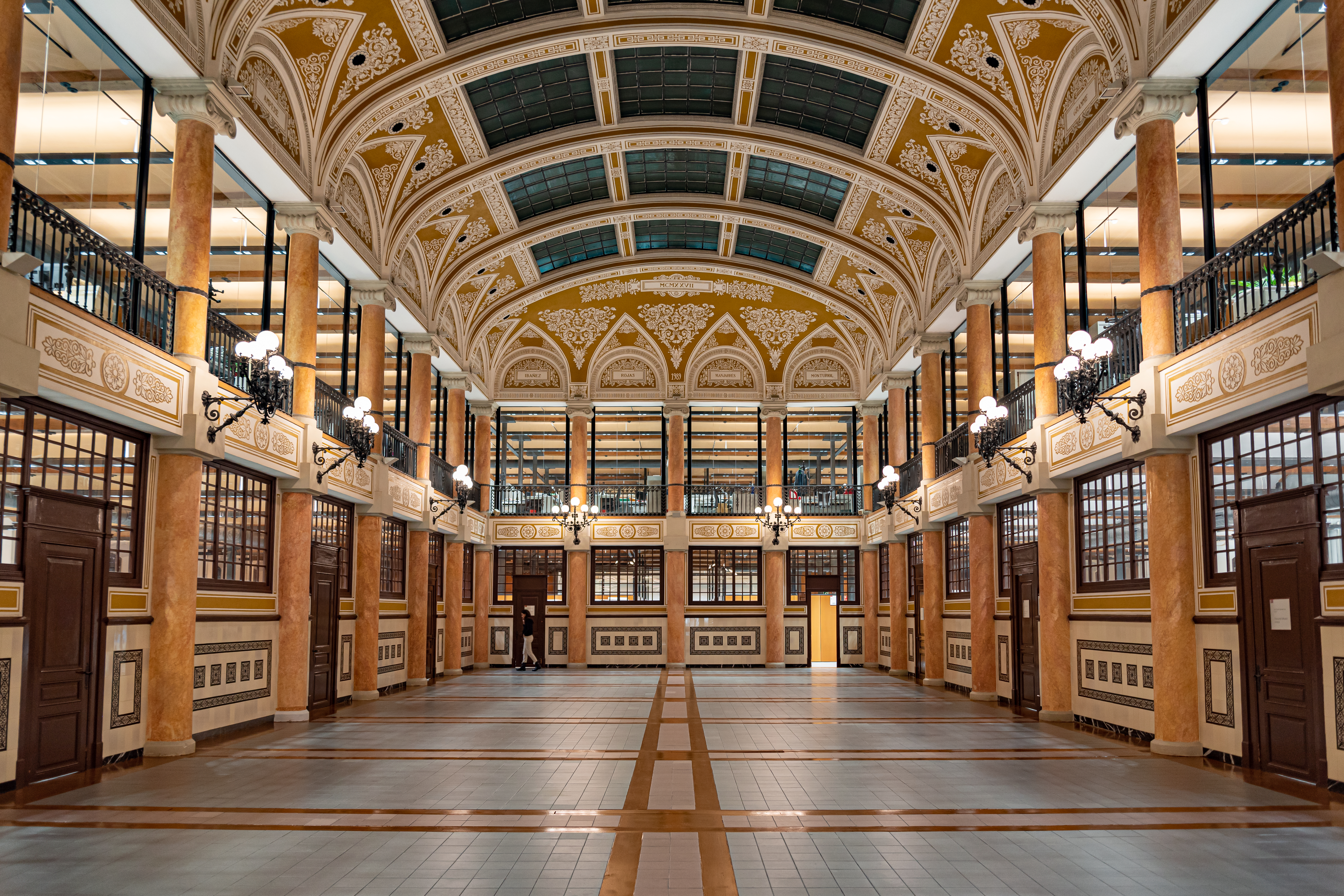
Industrial School

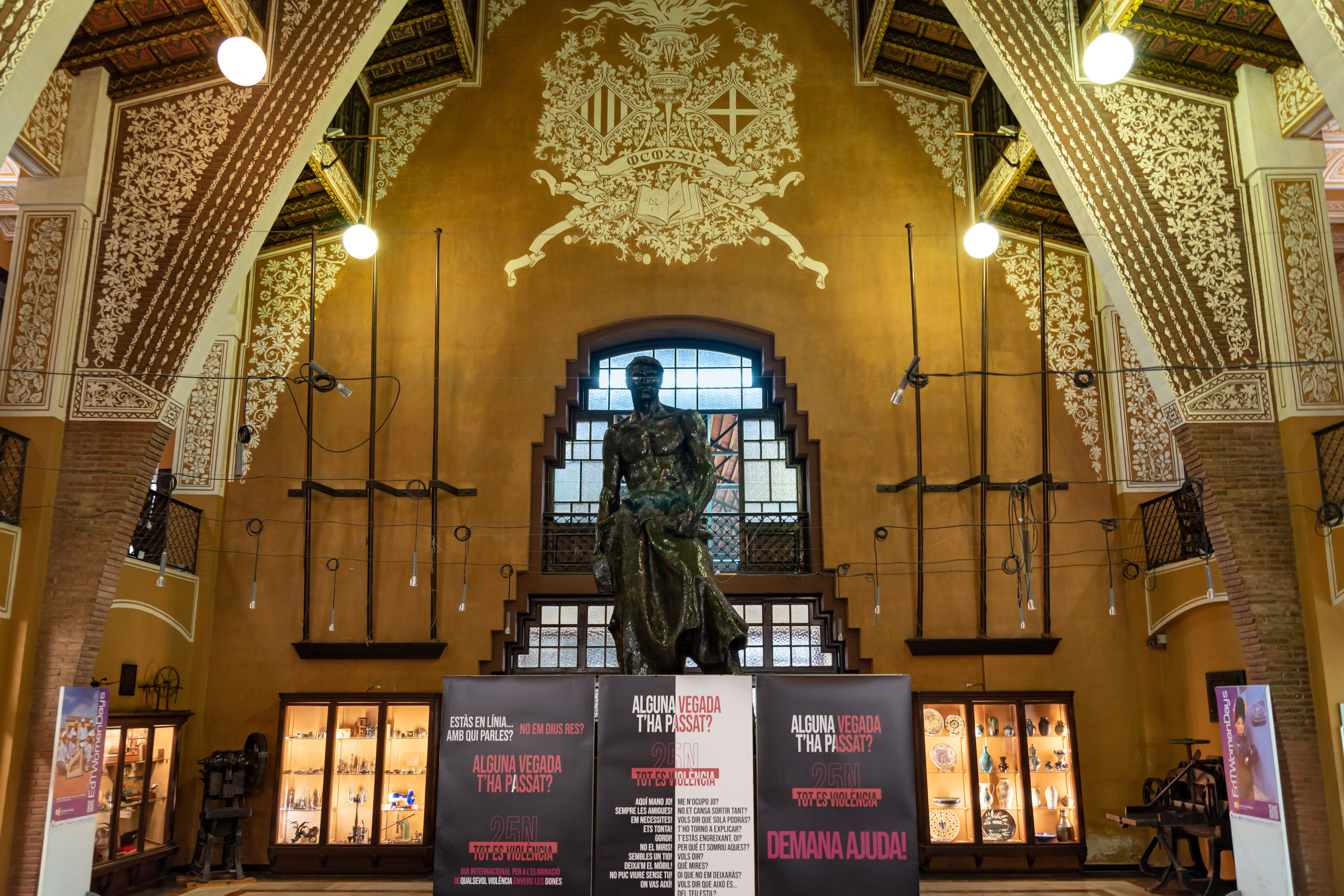
Industrial School's Escola del Treball

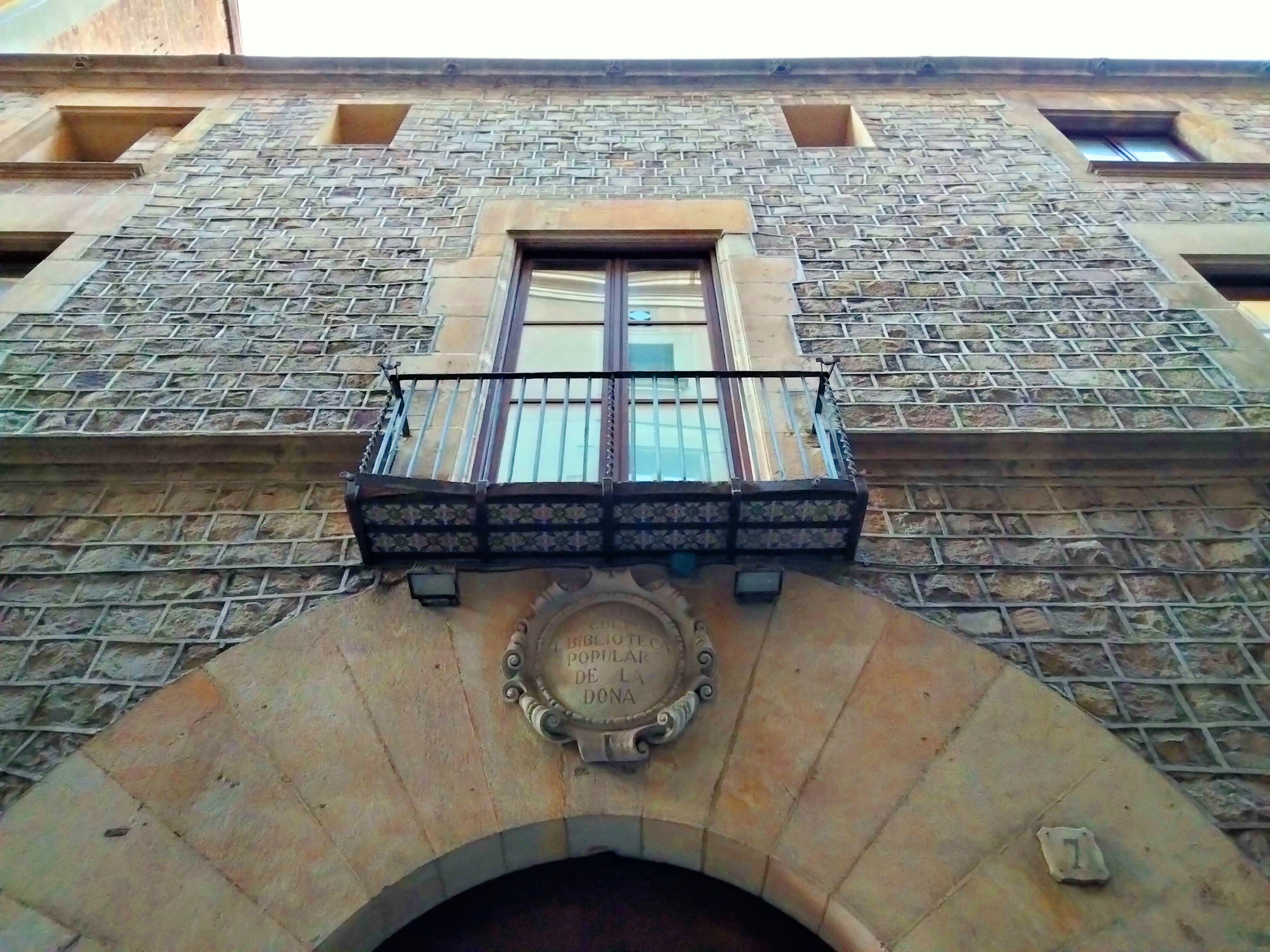
Francesca Bonnemaison Space

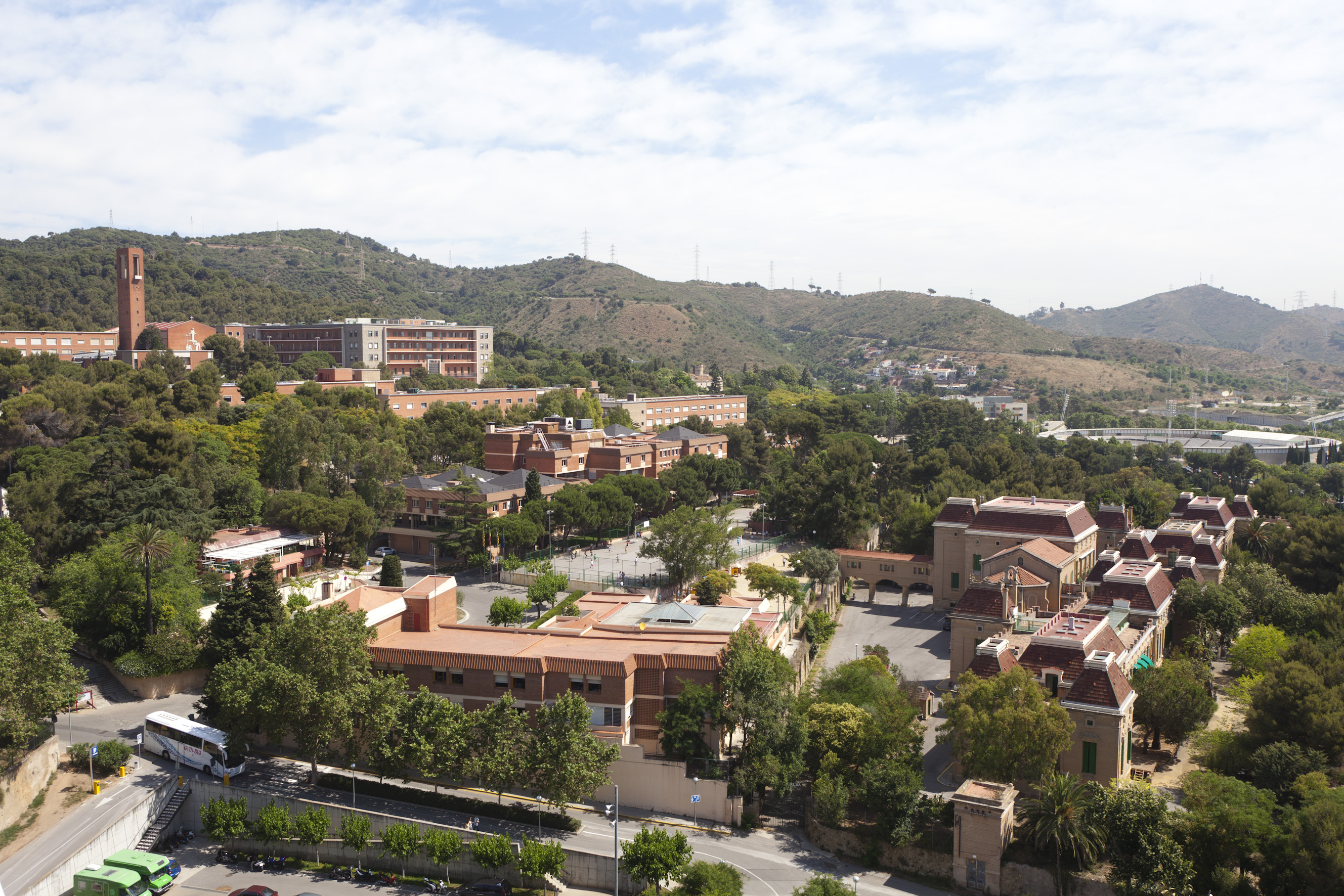
Recinte Mundet, hosting a campus of the University of Barcelona

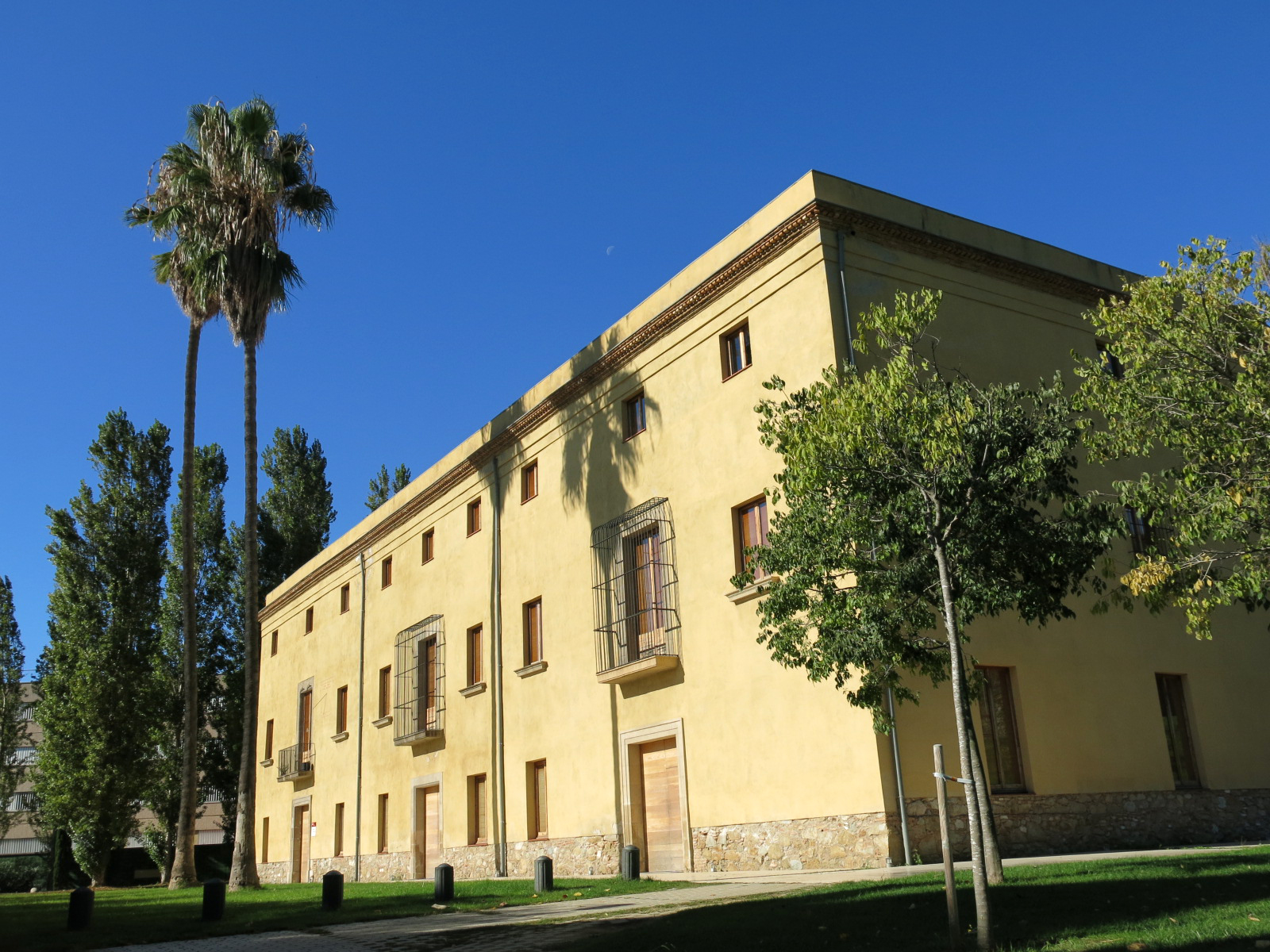
Torribera
