= Cándida Martínez López =

Spanish historian and politician (born 1951)

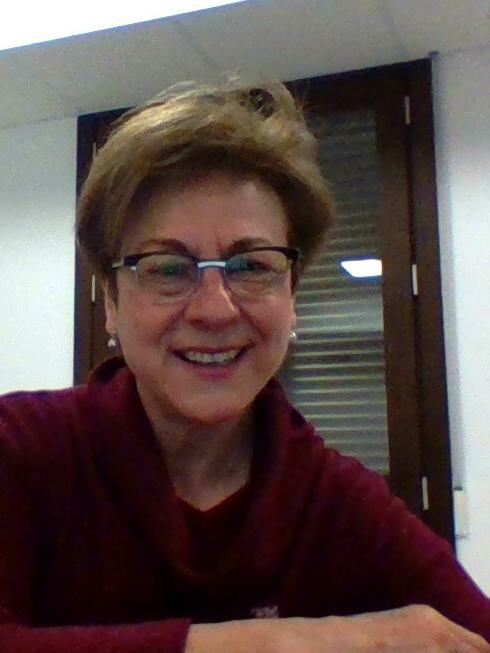
- March 2016
- Born: 6 December 1951 (age 74); Vélez-Blanco, Spain
- Education: University of Granada
- Occupations: Politician, academic, writer
- Employer: University of Granada
- Organization: University Institute of Women's and Gender Research and Studies
- Political party: Spanish Socialist Workers' Party (1996–present)

Deputy of the Cortes Generales
- In office 26 March 2008 – 13 December 2011
- Constituency: Province of Granada

Councilor of Education of the Regional Government of Andalusia
- In office 29 April 2000 – 28 January 2008
- Preceded by: Manuel Pezzi
- Succeeded by: Sebastián Cano Fernández
- Website: www.ugr.es/~candidam/

Cándida Martínez López (born 6 December 1951) is a Spanish historian, university professor, expert in women's history and studies, and politician. From 2000 to 2008 she was Councilor of Education of the Regional Government of Andalusia, and from 2008 to 2011 a deputy of the 9th Legislature of Spain. She is co-director of Arenal, Journal of Women's History.

== Biography ==
With a doctorate in Geography and History from the University of Granada, Cándida Martínez López is a professor of Ancient History at that school's Faculty of Philosophy and Letters, and a visiting professor at several foreign institutions, such as the Sapienza University of Rome and the National Autonomous University of Mexico.

She was the first woman Dean of the University of Granada's Faculty of Philosophy and Letters, serving from 1990 to 1996.

== Women's history ==
In her professional career, her research has focused on the history of women, women in Mediterranean societies, women and peace, maternity, and reflection on theory and methodology of history from a feminist perspective.

She was part of the group of professors who promoted Women's Studies in Spain, the creation of the Seminar on Women's Studies, and the subsequent University Institute of Women's and Gender Research and Studies that she directed in 2000.

At the University of Granada, throughout her teaching career in the area of Women's and Gender Studies, Martínez López has taught classes in the Licentiate and Bachelor's in History programs, in the Postgraduate Expert in Gender Studies program, in the Interuniversity Master's in Culture of Peace: Conflicts, Education and Human Rights, and in the Erasmus Mundus European Master's in Women's and Gender Studies (GEMMA). She has also given courses in several doctoral programs. Since 2015, Martínez López has coordinated the University of Granada's program Women's Doctoral Studies, Discourses, and Practices of Gender.

She was also co-founder of the Spanish Women's History Association (AEIHM) and Arenal, Journal of Women's History, of which she is co-director with Mary Nash.

== Political career ==
A member of the Spanish Socialist Workers' Party (PSOE) since 1996, Martínez López was a member of the Parliament of Andalusia, and in 2000 she was appointed Councilor of Education of the Regional Government of Andalusia, becoming its Minister of Education from 2004 to 2008. She was president of Grenada's Parque de las Ciencias from 2000 to 2008.

In 2008 she headed the PSOE list for the Province of Granada in the general elections, being elected to the Congress of Deputies, where she was the socialist parliamentary group's spokesperson for Education. She was part of the PSOE's federal executive, responsible for Education and Culture from 2008 to 2012.

== Selected publications ==
- Martínez López, C. (ed.), La Mujer en el Mundo Mediterráneo antiguo. Granada: University of Granada, 1990
- Ballarín Domingo, P.; Martínez López, C. Del Patio a la Plaza. Las Mujeres en las sociedades mediterráneas. Granada: University of Granada, 1995
- Martínez López, C. (ed.), Feminismo, ciencia y transformación social. Granada: University of Granada, 1995
- Martínez López, C.; Muñoz Muñoz, F. A. Poblamiento ibérico y romano en el sureste peninsular la comarca de los Vélez (Almería). Granada: University of Granada, 1999
- Martínez López, C. "La historia de las Mujeres en España en los años noventa". In: Ortiz Gómez, T., Martínez López, C. et al., Universidad y feminismo en España II. Situación de los Estudios de las Mujeres en las universidades españolas en los años 90. Granada: University of Granada. Col. Feminae, 1999
- Martínez López, C.; Pascua, M. J. de la; Pastor, R.; Tavera, S. (dir.), Las Mujeres en la Historia de España. Diccionario biográfico. Barcelona: Ed. Planeta, 2000
- Mirón Pérez, M. D.; Martínez López, C.; Díez, E.; Sánchez, M.; Martín, A. Las Mujeres y la paz: génesis y evolución de conceptualizaciones, símbolos y prácticas. Madrid: Instituto de la Mujer, 2004
- Martínez López, C. "La memoria de las mujeres en la arquitectura pública: matronazgo cívico en el Hispania romana". In: Diez Jorge, E. (ed.): Arquitectura y mujeres en la Historia. Madrid: Síntesis, 2015. pp. 59–88
- Martínez López, C. "Mujeres y diosas mediadoras de paz". In: Díez Jorge, M. E.; Sánchez Romero, M. (coord.) Género y Paz. Barcelona: Icaria, 2010. pp. 57–82
- Martínez López, C. "Las Mujeres y la Universidad. Ambivalencia de su integración". In: Rodriguez Martínez, C. (Comp.), Género y Currículo. Aportaciones del género al estudio y práctica del currículo. Madrid: Akal, 2006. pp. 216–225
- Martínez López, C.; Sánchez, S. (eds.), Escuela, espacio de paz. Reflexiones desde Andalucía. Granada: University of Granada, 2013
- Martínez López, C.; Nash, M. "20 años de Historia de las Mujeres en España". Arenal, Journal of Women's History, 20(1): 5-40 (2013)
- Martínez López, C. y Serrano, F. (eds.). Matronazgo y arquitectura. De la antigüedad a la Edad Moderna. Granada: University of Granada, Colección feminae, 2016
- Martínez López, C. y Ubric, P. (eds.), Cartografías de género en las ciudades antiguas. Granada: University of Granada, Colección feminae, 2017
