= Rambla de Catalunya =

Street in Barcelona, Spain

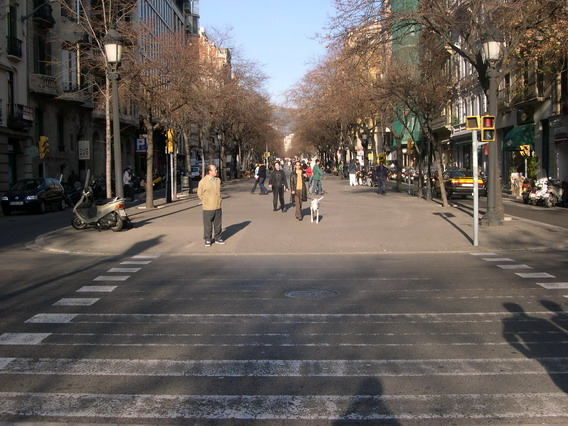
- View of the central lane
- Interactive map of Rambla de Catalunya
- Length: 1.3 km (0.81 mi)
- Location: Barcelona, Catalonia, Spain
- Coordinates: 41°23′30″N 2°09′46″E
- From: Plaça de Catalunya
- To: Avinguda Diagonal

Rambla de Catalunya (Catalan pronunciation: [ˈramblə ðə kətəˈluɲə]; Spanish: Rambla de Cataluña) is a major street in the Eixample district of central Barcelona, Spain. It is one of the city's trendiest streets, with many international fashion shops, and is lined with lime trees.

The street stretches from Plaça de Catalunya to Avinguda Diagonal, a distance of some 1.3 kilometres (0.81 mi). It runs parallel to, and between, the Passeig de Gràcia and Carrer de Balmes. It can be seen as an extension into the Eixample of the famous La Rambla.

== Sights ==
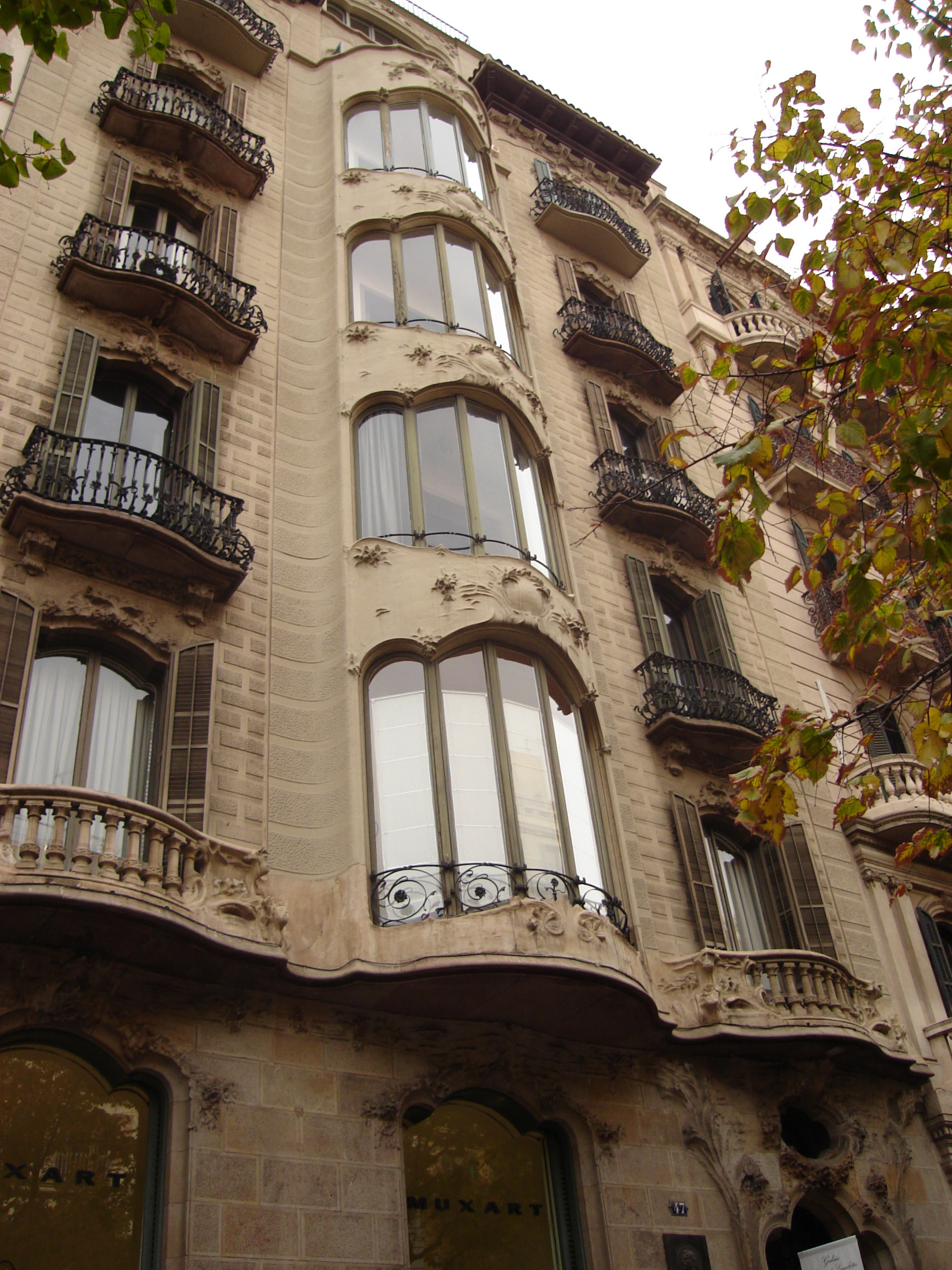
Casa Fargas

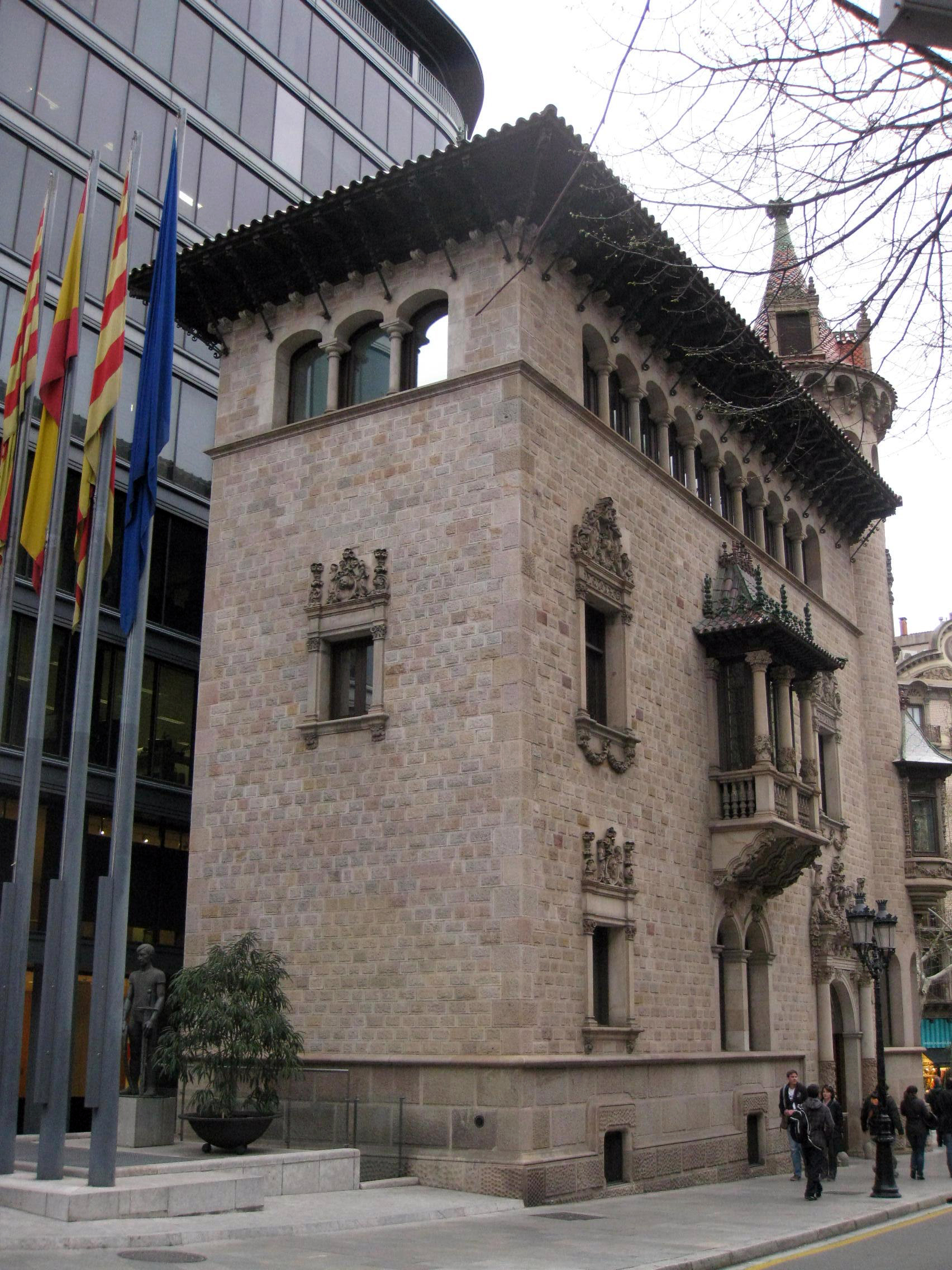
Casa Serra

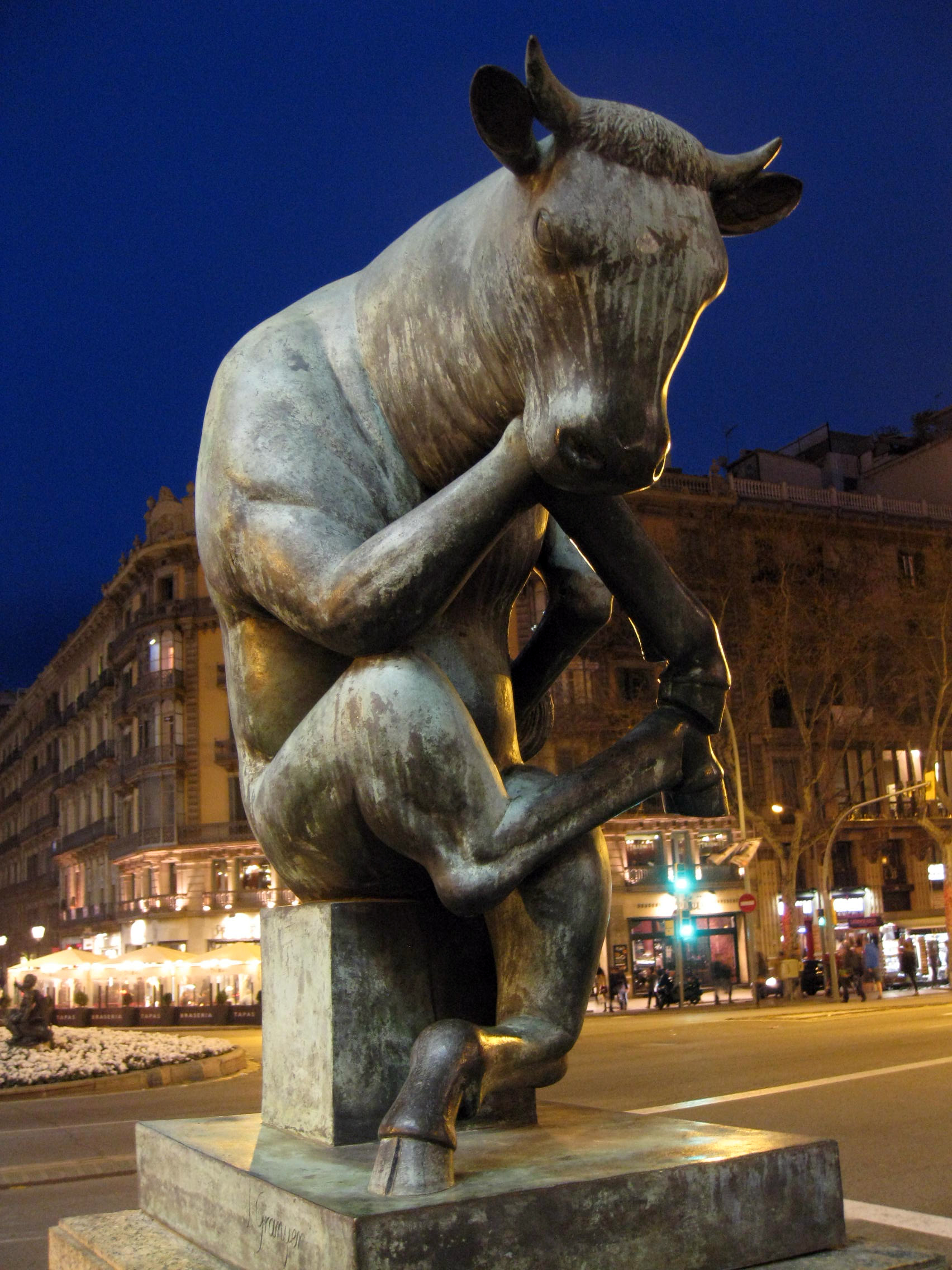
El toro assegut

The street is lined by a number of notable buildings:

- Casa Pia Batlló, 17 Rambla de Catalunya, by Josep Vilaseca i Casanovas, 1891–96
- Casa Fargas, 47 Rambla de Catalunya, by Enric Sagnier i Vilavecchia, 1902-04. An example of the architect's mature Modernista period.
- Casa Dolors Calm, 54 Rambla de Catalunya, originally by Josep Déu i Busquets, 1879, and remodelled in 1903 by Josep Vilaseca i Casanovas
- Casa Juncosa, 78 Rambla de Catalunya, by Salvador Viñals i Sabater, 1907-09.
- Church of La Mare de Déu de Montsió, 115 Rambla de Catalunya. Originally built in about 1400 on a site near what is now the Plaça Catalunya and moved here in 1882 by the architect Joan Martorell.
- Casa Antoni Costa, 122 Rambla de Catalunya, by Josep Domènech i Estapà, 1904.
- Casa Serra, 126 Rambla de Catalunya, by Josep Puig i Cadafalch, 1903-8, in a neo-Romanesque style.

There are also two notable statues in the street, both created by the sculptor Josep Granyer in 1972:

- La girafa coqueta, at the streets western end, by Avinguda Diagonal.
- El toro assegut, on the crossing with the Gran Via de les Corts Catalanes.

== Culture ==
The Rambla de Catalunya has always been a street noted for its art galleries, theatres and cinemas. Some of which have disappeared or been transformed with the passing of the years, but there are still two cinemas on the street.

Unfortunately the Teatre Barcelona, once one of the most iconic theatres in the city, has had to be pulled down.

== Transport ==
Like the more famous La Rambla, the Rambla de Catalunya has a wide central pedestrianised area. This is flanked by two narrow service roads, which in turn are flanked by narrow pedestrian walkways in front of the buildings. Unlike La Rambla, the central pedestrian walkway is interrupted by cross-streets.

The nearest Barcelona Metro stations are:

- Catalunya, immediately adjacent to Plaça Catalunya, is a major interchange station served by several metro and suburban railway lines.
- Diagonal, near the intersection with Avinguda Diagonal, is another major interchange, with the platforms on various lines linked by long underground passageways. This is the only station with an access directly to the Rambla de Catalunya.
- Passeig de Gràcia is one city block east of the midpoint of the street.

== See also ==
- List of streets and squares in Eixample, Barcelona
- Street names in Barcelona
- Urban planning of Barcelona
