= Celestino Corbacho =

Spanish politician (born 1949)

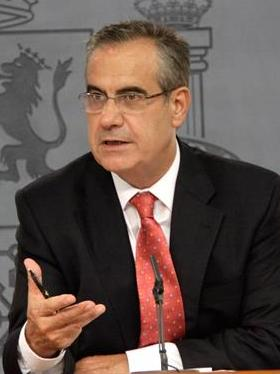

Minister of Labour and Immigrations
- In office 14 April 2008 – 20 October 2010
- Monarch: Juan Carlos I
- Prime Minister: José Luis Rodríguez Zapatero
- Preceded by: Jesús Caldera Sánchez-Capitán
- Succeeded by: Valeriano Gómez

President of the Provincial Deputation of Barcelona
- In office 22 April 2004 – 14 April 2008
- Preceded by: José Montilla
- Succeeded by: Antoni Fogué

Mayor of L'Hospitalet de Llobregat
- In office 10 May 1994 – 14 April 2008
- Preceded by: Juan Ignacio Pujana Fernández
- Succeeded by: Núria Marín

Member of the Parliament of Catalonia
- In office 30 November 1995 – 24 August 1999
- Constituency: Barcelona
- In office 16 December 2010 – 4 August 2015
- Constituency: Barcelona

Member of the Barcelona City Council
- In office 15 June 2019 – 30 September 2022

Member of L'Hospitalet de Llobregat City Council
- In office 7 May 1983 – 14 April 2008

Personal details
- Born: 14 November 1949 (age 76) Valverde de Leganés, Spain
- Party: Socialists' Party of Catalonia (1978–2018)
- Occupation: Politician

Celestino Corbacho Chaves (Valverde de Leganés, Badajoz, 14 November 1949) is a Spanish politician, who was Member of Catalan Parliament and Minister of Labour and Immigrations in José Luis Rodríguez Zapatero cabinet between 2008 and 2010.

He was the mayor of L'Hospitalet de Llobregat from 1994 till 2008, and vice president and then president of the Diputación de Barcelona. He was a member of the Socialists' Party of Catalonia. After 2019 local elections, he is member of the Barcelona city council for Ciudadanos party.

== Honours ==
=== National honours ===
- Knight Grand Cross of the Order of Charles III (05/11/2010).
