= Carlos Mulas Granados =

Spanish economist

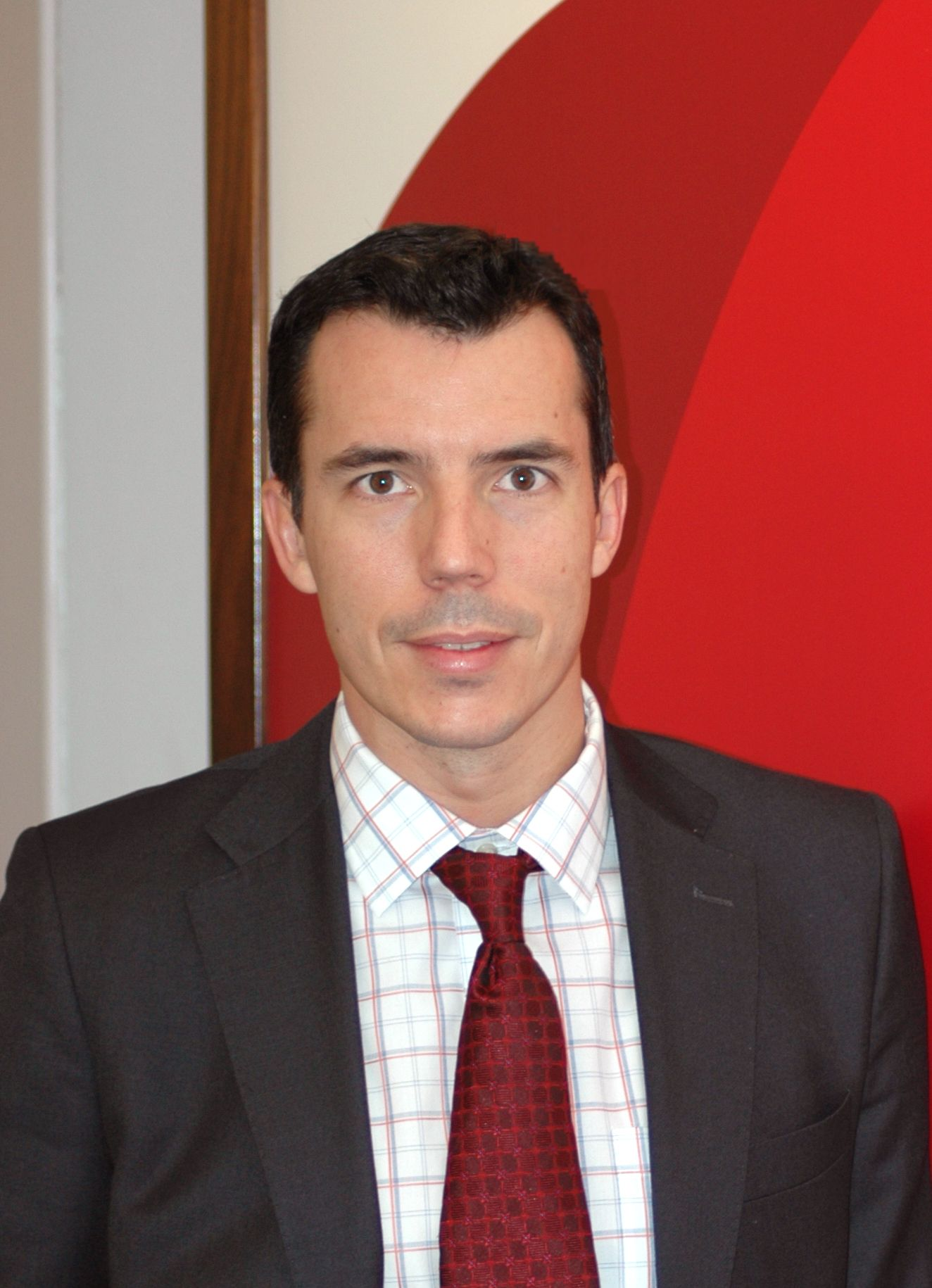
Carlos Mulas Granados

Carlos Mulas Granados (born 1974 in Madrid, Spain) is an economist and university professor. Former deputy director of the Spanish Prime Minister's Office and former director of the Ideas Foundation, currently he is senior economist of the International Monetary Fund. (IMF).

== Biography ==
Born in Madrid (Spain), he studied in Madrid and got an International Baccalaureate degree at I.R. Maeztu. He then got graduate degrees in Economics and Business Administration from University Carlos III, with a period at Antwerp University (Erasmus program). He also holds a PhD in economics from Cambridge University, a European Doctorate from and Master in International Affairs from Columbia University. Carlos Mulas Granados was a tenured professor of economics at the Complutense University of Madrid until he left on secondment and joined the International Monetary Fund in 2012. Also, after 4 years at IDEAS Foundation from the Spanish Socialist Party (PSOE), he stepped down from his position as director. Shortly after, he joined the International Monetary Fund (IMF). Mulas had run for the Spanish Congress Congreso de los Diputados de España in the list of that socialist party during the general elections of 2011 Elecciones generales de España de 2011. He also contributed to the economic program of the Spanish prime minister José Luis Rodríguez Zapatero, and was deputy director of the economic office of the prime minister. He was later the executive director of the IDEAS Foundation until he joined the International Monetary Fund (IMF).

== Awards and recognitions ==
In April 2017, Mulas received a Fund Departmental award for his IMF book entitled "Fiscal Politics" In April 2015, Mulas received a Fund Global Award for his work on "Inequality Issues".

His article entitled “Duration of Fiscal Adjustments in the European Union” won the Prize of the Chair Uni-2 for the best article of European Economics at 2003

He was awarded the Medal of the Spanish Order Isabel la Católica in 2006, for his public services during his tenure as the deputy director of the Prime Minister's Economic Office, a position to which he was appointed in 2004.

== Activities of social entrepreneurship ==
He collaborated with the social initiatives of Aprocor Foundation for the inclusion of intellectually impaired people in the labor market. To give a good example, he worked directly with some of them.

As a co-founder of the production company Storylines he co-produced the short-film entitled “Have a Nice Trip”, which was recognized for its positive treatment of immigration , and he also co-produced the short-film “Uniformed”, a movie advocating gender equality in childhood. This latter work has received about thirty national and international awards and was selected as the Short of the Week in El País , ABC , and RTVE.

== Ideas Foundation ==
In May 2009, Carlos Mulas Granados was appointed as director of the Ideas Foundation. From that position he co-launched the Global Progress initiative in collaboration with the Center for American Progress. The Global Progress summits brought together world figures like Lula da Silva, Bill Clinton, Tony Blair, Thabo Mbeki, JL Zapatero, Michelle Bachelet, Gordon Brown or Francois Hollande, for different meetings held in Madrid, New York and London. In October 2011, at the request of the Ideas Foundation led by Mulas, these world leaders signed a petition to the G20 in favor of a social pact to end the crisis.

Mulas was fired as executive director of the Ideas Foundation in 2013 after a case of political corruption involving his wife, who received hidden payments for expert reports on a variety of issues. In February 2013 he also abandoned the PSOE after the political party started the process to oust him. In that period the Spanish conservative newspaper El Mundo reported against his famous ex-wife for writing articles using the nickname of Amy Martin while receiving disproportionally high payments for such articles. She claims that it was as part of a performance for her latest novel Last Days of Warla Alkman, published in November 2013.

Soon after leaving the Ideas Foundation he joined the International Monetary Fund.

== Political activity ==
Member of "Economists 2004", a group of independent economists responsible for the economic program of the future prime minister Zapatero for the 2004 elections.

Member of the editorial committee of PSOE's electoral manifesto in 2008 and 2011.

Candidate for Congress in the list of PSOE in Madrid (Spain) for the general elections held in 2011. He was called to join the Congress in September 2014, but he announced that he would continue his career at the International Monetary Fund.
