= 2008 PSOE federal party congress =

- 4−6 July 2008

995 delegates in the Federal Congress Plurality of delegates needed to win
- Turnout: Secretary-General: 955 (96.0%); Executive & Committee: 930 (93.5%)
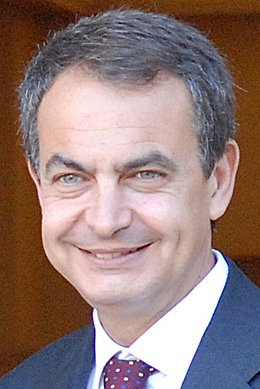

Candidate	José Luis Rodríguez Zapatero	Blank ballots
Delegate vote	941 (98.5%)	14 (1.5%)
Executive	920 (98.9%)	10 (1.1%)
Committee	921 (99.0%)	9 (1.0%)
Party leader before election
José Luis Rodríguez
Zapatero
Party leader after
election
José Luis Rodríguez
Zapatero

The Spanish Socialist Workers' Party (PSOE) held its 37th federal congress in Madrid from 4 to 6 July 2008, to renovate its governing bodies—including the post of secretary-general, which amounted to that of party leader—and establish the party platform and policy until the next congress.

It was held shortly after the party's victory in the 2008 general election and saw José Luis Rodríguez Zapatero being re-elected unopposed for a third term as party secretary-general, with 98.5% of the delegate vote in the congress (941 votes) and 1.5% of blank ballots (14).

== Candidates ==
Candidate	Notable positions	Announced	Ref.
=== Proposed ===
Candidates who were officially proposed to contest the party congress.
José Luis Rodríguez Zapatero (age 47)	Prime Minister of Spain (since 2004); Secretary-General of the PSOE (since 2000); Member of the Congress of Deputies for Madrid (since 2004); Leader of the Opposition of Spain (2000–2004); Member of the Congress of Deputies for León (1986–2004); Member of the PSOE Executive Commission (1997–2000); Secretary-General of the PSOE in the province of León (1988–2000)	4 July 2008	

== Results ==
Summary of the 5–6 July 2008 congress results
Candidate	SG		Executive		Committee	
Candidate	Votes	%	Votes	%	Votes	%
José Luis Rodríguez Zapatero	941	98.53	920	98.92	921	99.03
Blank ballots	14	1.47	10	1.08	9	0.97
Total	955		930		930	
Valid votes	955	100.00	930	100.00	930	100.00
Invalid votes	0	0.00	0	0.00	0	0.00
Votes cast / turnout	955	95.98	930	93.47	930	93.47
Not voting	40	4.02	65	6.53	65	6.53
Total delegates	995		995		995	

Vote by delegates (Secretary-General)
Zapatero	98.53%
Blank ballots	1.47%

Vote by delegates (Executive Commission)
Zapatero	98.92%
Blank ballots	1.08%

Vote by delegates (Federal Committee)
Zapatero	99.03%
Blank ballots	0.97%
