= Ángeles Muñoz =

Spanish politician (born 1960)

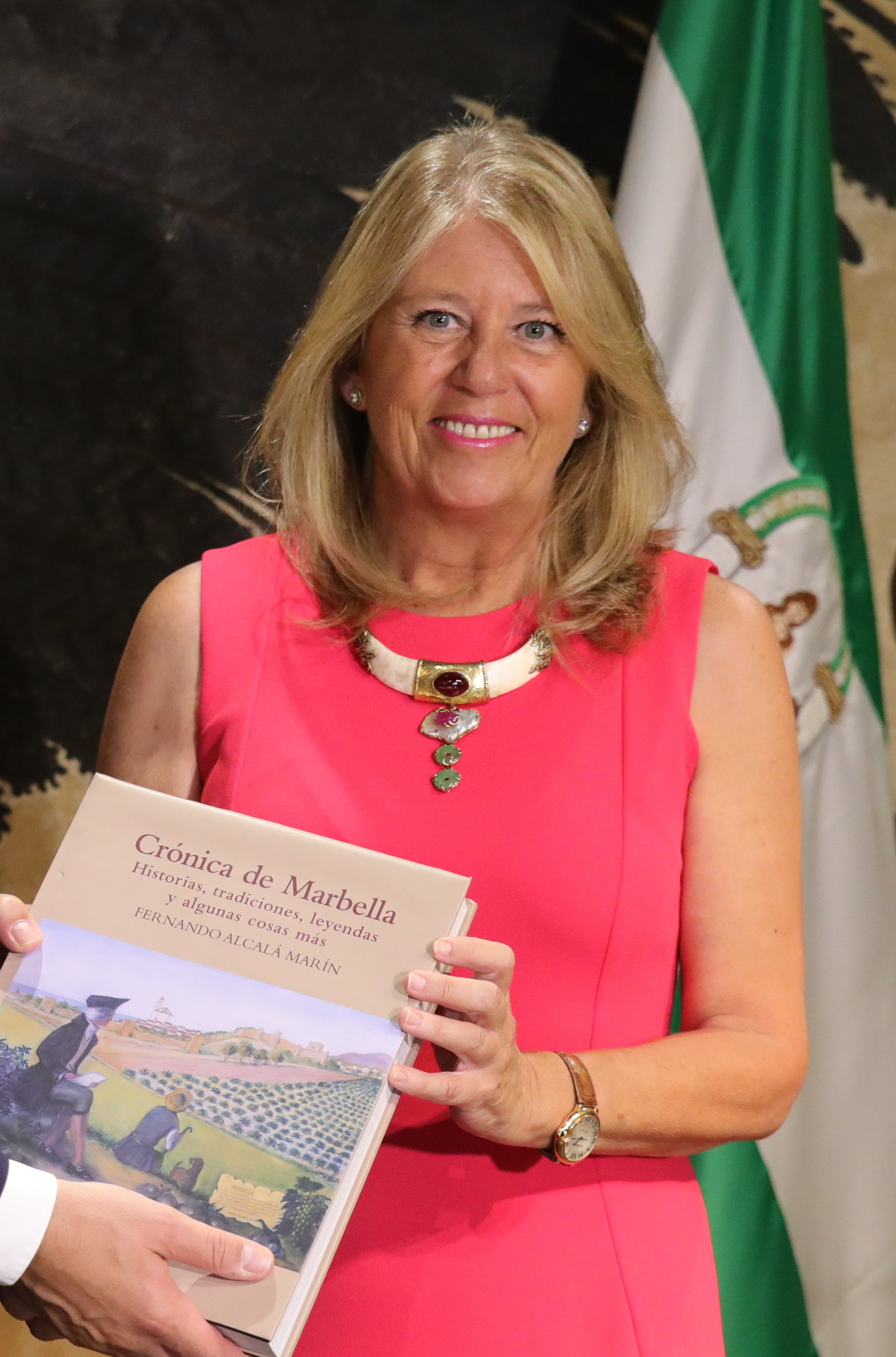

María Ángeles Muñoz Uriol (born 20 January 1960) is a Spanish politician of the People's Party (PP). Elected to the city council in Marbella in 2003, she was mayor of the city from 2007 to 2015 and again from 2017. She was also a member of the Congress of Deputies (2000–2008) and Senate of Spain (2016–2023).

== Biography ==
=== Early career ===
Muñoz was born in Córdoba in Andalusia, and qualified as a doctor specialising in family medicine in 1986. She then practiced medicine in San Pedro Alcántara, a town within Marbella's municipal limits.

Muñoz left medicine for politics in 1995 when elected deputy mayor of Benahavís in the Province of Málaga. In 1996, she was elected to the Parliament of Andalusia, and a year later she was named director general of the Migration Ordinance of the Ministry of Labour and Social Affairs, serving until 12 February 1999.

=== Mayor of Marbella and senator ===
Muñoz was elected president of the People's Party (PP) of Marbella in 1998 and elected to the city council in 2003 having run for mayor, winning four out of 27 seats. This was the last mandate in which the city was governed by the Liberal Independent Group (GIL) of Jesús Gil that had run it since 1991; the council was dissolved by the national government in April 2006 due to widespread corruption. In the 2007 elections, her party quadrupled its number of seats amidst the wipeout of GIL, and she was elected mayor. She won a second term four years later.

In 2015, José Bernal of the Spanish Socialist Workers' Party (PSOE) was installed as mayor with the support of United Left/The Greens–Assembly for Andalusia, Podemos and Opción Sampedreña (OSP), a localist group for San Pedro Alcántara. On 29 August 2017, she regained office after a motion of no confidence in Bernal, supported by the 13 councillors from her party and the two of OSP. She was further elected with a majority in 2019 and 2023.

The PP named Muñoz as lead candidate in their list for the Senate of Spain in the 2015 Spanish general election, for the Málaga constituency. They took three of the four constituency seats, and repeated the feat in the next election months later. The situation was reversed in the elections of April and November 2019, with Muñoz the only PP senator from Málaga.

Muñoz earned €14,800 as mayor in 2020 due to the majority of her earnings coming from the Senate and being paid only to attend local plenary sessions and commissions. In 2023, she declined to run for the Senate in upcoming elections, instead working exclusively as mayor. Weeks later, her salary was increased to €92,928, in a decision supported by her party, abstained on by the PSOE and OSP, and rejected by Vox. Muñoz's new salary was slightly more than the prime minister of Spain Pedro Sánchez and President of the Regional Government of Andalusia Juanma Moreno; it was marginally less than mayor of Seville José Luis Sanz and mayor of Málaga Francisco de la Torre, whose cities had populations over three times as much. She became the eighth-highest paid mayor in Spain, and the highest outside of a provincial capital.
