= Ana Pastor (politician) =

Spanish politician (born 1957)

The Most Excellent Ana Pastor MP
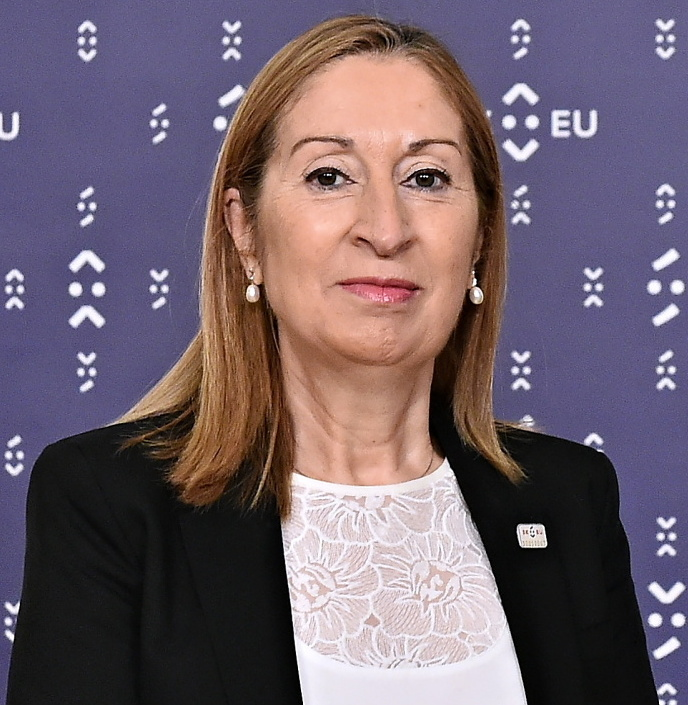

President of the Congress of Deputies
- In office 19 July 2016 – 20 May 2019
- Monarch: Felipe VI
- Vice President: José Ignacio Prendes; Micaela Navarro; Rosa María Romero; María Gloria Elizo
- Preceded by: Patxi López
- Succeeded by: Meritxell Batet

Second Vice President of the Congress of Deputies
- In office 3 December 2019 – 17 August 2023
- President: Meritxell Batet
- Preceded by: Alfonso Rodríguez Gómez de Celis
- Succeeded by: José Antonio Bermúdez de Castro
- In office 1 April 2008 – 13 December 2011
- President: José Bono
- Preceded by: Jordi Vilajoana
- Succeeded by: Jaime Javier Barrero

Minister of Development
- In office 22 December 2011 – 19 July 2016
- Prime Minister: Mariano Rajoy
- Preceded by: José Blanco López
- Succeeded by: Íñigo de la Serna

Minister of Health, Social Services and Equality
- In office 10 July 2002 – 18 April 2004
- Prime Minister: José María Aznar
- Preceded by: Celia Villalobos
- Succeeded by: Elena Salgado

Member of the Congress of Deputies
- Incumbent
- Assumed office 1 March 1996
- Constituency: Pontevedra

Personal details
- Born: 11 November 1957 (age 68) Cubillos, Spain
- Party: PP
- Spouse: José Benito Suárez Costa
- Education: University of Salamanca

Ana María Pastor Julián (born 11 November 1957) is a Spanish doctor and politician for the People's Party who served as President of the Congress of Deputies from 19 July 2016 to 20 May 2019. Previously she was Minister of Health from 2002 to 2004 and Minister of Public Works from 2011 to 2016. Since 20 May 2019 is the Second Vice President of the Congress of Deputies.

== Early life ==
Ana Pastor Julián was born in Cubillos del Pan, Zamora, she has a degree in Medicine and Surgery from the University of Salamanca and was an officer of the Senior Public Health and Health Administration.

== Career ==
She has been Head of Health Service Planning of the delegation of provincial council of Pontevedra of Minister of Health of the Xunta de Galicia (Galician Government), and primary care manager in the province of Pontevedra and provincial council director of the Galician Health Service, SERGAS (Galician Health Service). She was general director of the General Mutual State Civil Servants (Muface). In the People's Party XV Congress she was elected executive secretary of Social Policy. She also became the coordinator of Social Participation of the party. She has represented Pontevedra Province in the Spanish Congress of Deputies since 2000, becoming second vice president of the Bureau of the Congress of Deputies until 13 December 2011. On 22 December 2011, she was appointed Minister of Public Works and Transport of Spain.

On 11 March 2020, during the ongoing coronavirus pandemic, Pastor confirmed via Twitter she had tested positive for SARS-CoV-2.

== President of Congress ==
On 18 July 2016 Pastor was designated by Mariano Rajoy as the People's Party candidate for President of Congress, with the support of Citizens. As speaker, she headed the lower house's nine-member executive committee.

== Lobbying work ==
Ana Pastor Julián has been a patroness of Foundation for Analysis and Social Studies (FAES).

== Honours ==
=== National Honours ===
- Spain: Dame Grand Cross of the Order of Charles III

=== Foreign Honours ===
- Chile: Grand Cross of the Order of Merit (28 October 2014)
- Peru: Grand Cross of the Order of the Sun of Peru (27 February 2019)
- Portugal: Grand cross of the Order of Christ (Portugal) (15 April 2018)

Political offices
Preceded by Ignacio Gonzalez	Undersecretary of Education, Culture and Sport; 1999–2000	Succeeded by Mariano Zabía Lasala
Preceded by Juan Junquera González	Undersecretary of the Presidency; 2000–2001	Succeeded by Dolores de la Fuente Vázquez
Preceded by Leopoldo Calvo-Sotelo Ibáñez-Martín	Undersecretary of the Interior; 2001–2002	Succeeded by Maria Dolores de Cospedal
Preceded by Celia Villalobos	Minister of Health and Consumption; 2002–2004	Succeeded by Elena Salgado
Preceded by José Blanco	Second Vice President of the Congress of Deputies; 2008–2011	Succeeded by Javier Barrero
Preceded by Jordi Vilajoana	Minister of Public Works and Transport; 2011–2016	Succeeded by Rafael Catalá; Acting
Preceded by Patxi López	President of the Congress of Deputies; 2016–2019	Succeeded by Meritxell Batet
Preceded by Alfonso Rodríguez Gómez de Celis	Second Vice President of the Congress of Deputies; 2019–present	Incumbent
Party political offices
Preceded by Angeles Muñoz	Executive Secretary of the People's Party Social Policy; 2002–2004	Succeeded by Jose Ignacio Echániz
Preceded by Angeles Muñoz	People's Party Social Participation Coordinator; 2004–present	Incumbent
