= Francisco de la Torre (politician) =

Spanish politician

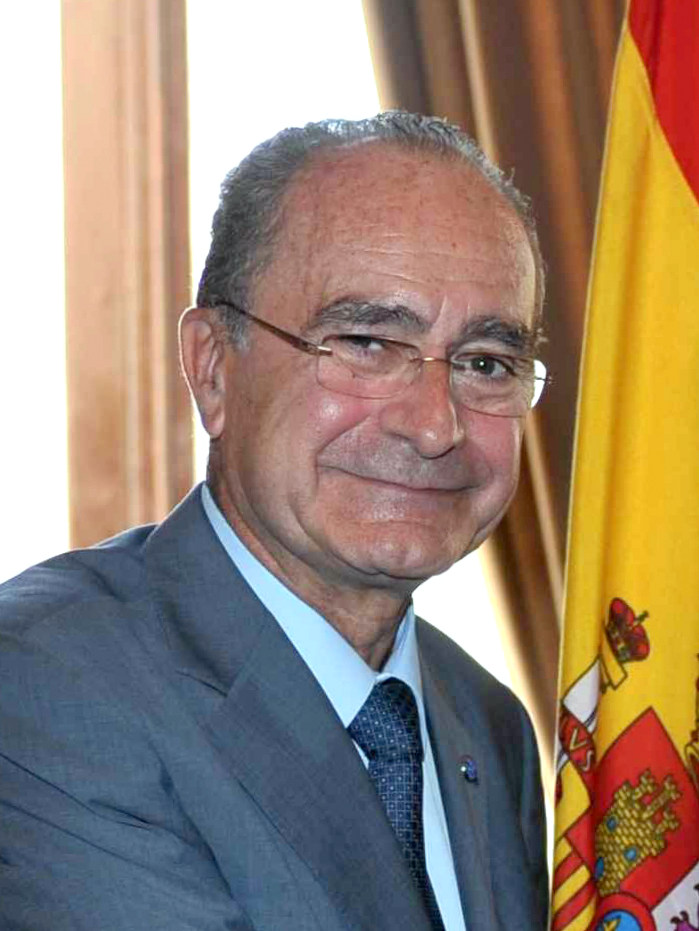
- De la Torre in 2010

Mayor of Málaga
- Incumbent
- Assumed office 4 May 2000
- Preceded by: Celia Villalobos

Senator
- In office 13 December 2011 – 20 June 2014
- Constituency: Málaga

Member of the Congress of Deputies
- In office 22 July 1977 – 28 October 1982
- Constituency: Málaga

President of the Provincial Deputation of Málaga
- In office 18 February 1971 – 18 February 1976

Personal details
- Born: 21 December 1942 (age 83) Málaga, Andalusia, Spain
- Party: People's Party (PP)

Francisco de la Torre Prados (born 21 December 1942) is a Spanish People's Party (PP) politician who has been the mayor of Málaga since 2000. He has also been president of the Provincial Deputation of Málaga (1971–1975), a member of the Congress of Deputies (1977–1982) and Senate (2011–2014).

He began his political career in 1971 as president of the Provincial Deputation of Málaga, being dismissed in 1975 by the Francoist government for his liberal views. He served in the Congress of Deputies as a member of the Union of the Democratic Centre, and was elected to Málaga City Council in 1995. He was part of the local government of Celia Villalobos and succeeded her as mayor in 2000.

De la Torre has won six local elections, though in 2015 and 2019 his party needed support from Citizens to form a majority in the city hall. He has been awarded the Legion of Honour by France, the Medal of Pushkin by Russia, and is an honorary member of the Order of the British Empire.

== Early life and career ==
Born in Málaga, De la Torre graduated in Sociology from the Pontifical University of Salamanca, earned a doctorate in Agronomic Engineering from the University of Madrid, and graduated in Regional Development from the University of Rennes in France. In 1971, aged 28, he was appointed president of the Provincial Deputation of Málaga under the Francoist dictatorship, and was dismissed in 1975 due to his liberal views.

In 1977, in the first democratic elections after the end of the dictatorship, De la Torre was elected to the Congress of Deputies for the Union of the Democratic Centre, where he remained until 1982. From May 1978 to June 1979 he was Advisor for Economy and Finance in the nascent Junta of Andalusia.

== Mayor of Málaga ==
In 1995, De la Torre, by then an independent politician, was elected to Málaga's city council as second on the People's Party list, and joined the party the following year. Mayor Celia Villalobos made him first deputy mayor, government spokesperson and Councillor responsible for City Planning, Housing, Projects, Territorial Development and Transport. Villalobos left in 2000 to become Minister of Health, and De la Torre became mayor.

In the 2011 general election, De la Torre returned to the Cortes Generales for the first time in 29 years as the Senate candidate in Málaga with the most votes (341,850). He quit this post in June 2014 to concentrate on the upcoming mayoral elections.

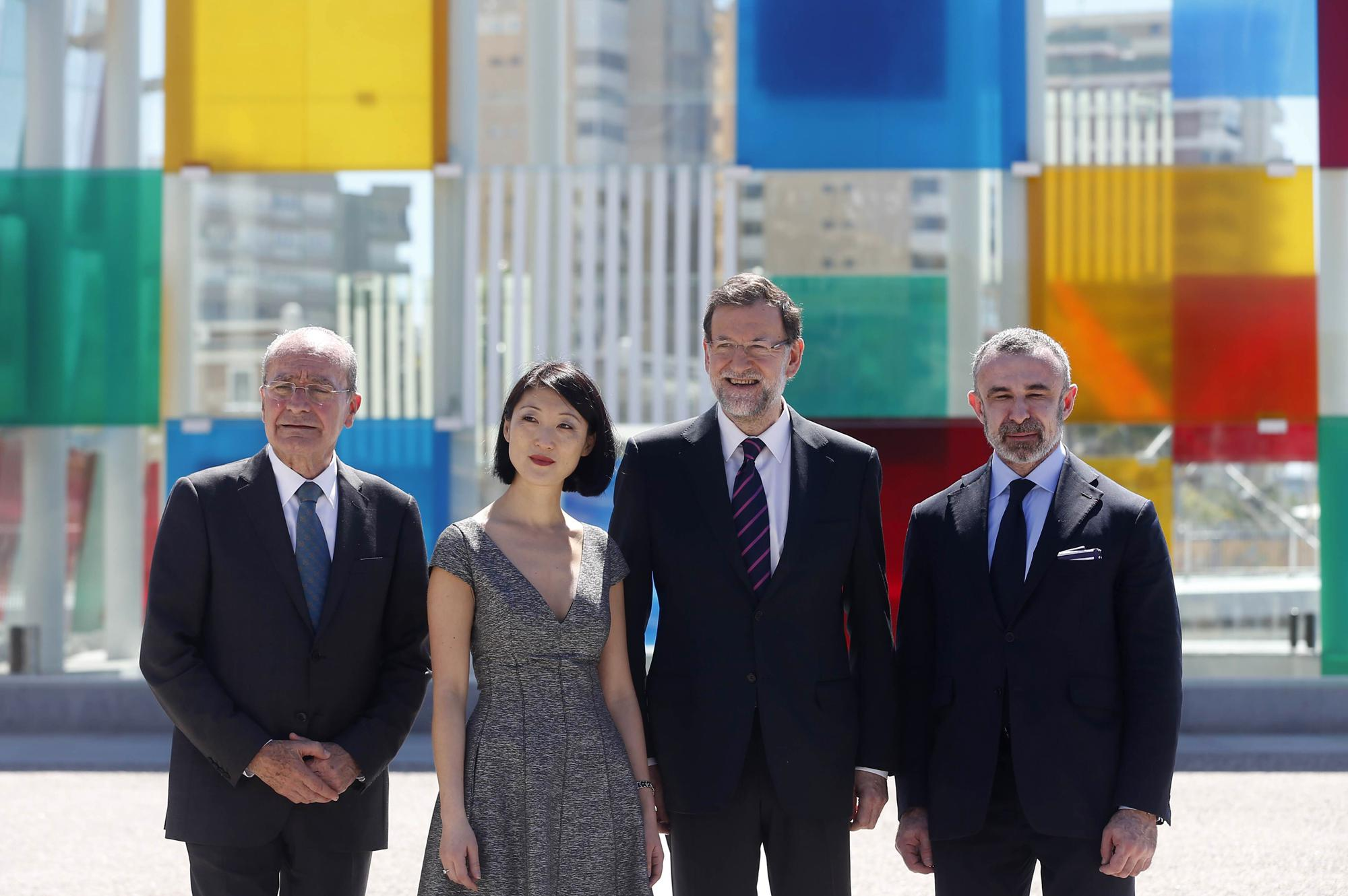
From left to right: De la Torre, Fleur Pellerin, Mariano Rajoy and Alain Seban at the opening of the Centre Pompidou's Málaga location in March 2015

De la Torre's party retained their majority in Málaga city hall in 2003, 2007 and 2011, but in 2015 they had to form a coalition with Citizens; this result still made him the PP mayor of the largest city; he blamed national corruption scandals for the party's decline in popularity. In 2019, he needed the support of the two Citizens councillors to form a majority for his sixth mandate.

De la Torre suffered a stroke in April 2020. After a month in hospital, he returned to work. Later in May, he marked 20 years as mayor. An article in La Opinión de Málaga was mostly positive on his two decades, apart from some expensive failed projects such as the Museum of Gems, and sanitation worker strikes.

In September 2022, De la Torre announced that he would stand for mayor for the sixth time in the May 2023 elections, by which time he would be 80. His party returned to majority government for the first time in eight years, increasing their share from 14 to 17 of the 31 seats amidst the wipeout of Citizens. In May 2025, he marked a quarter of a century as mayor. In July 2026, the PP announced its candidates for mayors of provincial capitals in the next year's elections, including De la Torre, who would be 84.

=== Housing and touristification ===
The economic and urban policy of the Málaga City Council during his tenure has made tourism one of its main pillars. The current General Urban Development Plan (PGOU) allows hotel use as compatible with residential use, which has favoured a sharp increase in tourist accommodation. Until 2024 the City Council did not place any restrictions on tourist apartments, and the mayor had repeatedly rejected a moratorium, citing the lack of reliable data and the inadequacy of the regional regulatory framework, which changed in February 2024 with a new decree from the Junta de Andalucía.

In March 2025 there were 12,660 registered tourist apartments in a city of about 580,000 inhabitants, with neighbourhoods where they made up more than a third of all dwellings, a concentration without equivalent in other Spanish cities. A study by IATUR concluded that 54% of the variations in rental prices can be explained by the concentration of tourist-use dwellings, and the mayor himself acknowledged in March 2025 that reducing the number of tourist apartments makes more long-term housing available.

Between 2024 and 2025 the City Council adopted three restrictions: the requirement of an independent entrance for tourist apartments (June 2024), their ban in the 43 neighbourhoods where they made up 8% or more of the housing stock (announced in October 2024), and a three-year moratorium starting in August 2025. With the 8% threshold, the number of tourist apartments could double across the city as a whole. The first three announcements came on the eve of housing demonstrations, and the opposition spoke of a "smokescreen".

At the end of May 2026 the mayor announced a suspension of new licences for tourist apartments and for hotels of fewer than four stars, which would be implemented through an amendment to the PGOU and last one year "or as long as legally possible". On 11 June the City Council's Urban Planning Governing Board (Consejo Rector de Urbanismo) was informed of a licence for twenty tourist apartments in the Capuchinos neighbourhood, with a planned investment of €1.3 million, promoted by La Corrala de Capuchinos S.L., a company of which José María García Urbano, mayor of Estepona (PP), is sole administrator. Approval of the licence had been given on 8 May, before the announcement. The Estepona City Council stated that the licence had been applied for "more than three years ago" and that there was "no irregularity or preferential treatment". The Málaga City Council defended it as a "regulated act" (acto reglado, i.e. one that leaves no room for discretion), while the PSOE and Con Málaga suggested "preferential treatment".

The City Council subsequently approved a three-year ban on new hotels and tourist apartments on residential land, in force since 25 July 2026. Between July and August, with the moratorium already in force, it granted licences to around one hundred tourist apartments in seven buildings, which was possible because the applicants had submitted "substantial documentation" before it came into force. Since the mayor signalled in March his willingness to ban them, licences had been granted for about 230 new tourist apartments. The number of tourist apartments fell from a peak of 13,254 in 2024 to 12,686 in June 2026, while the number of places in tourist apartment blocks reached 9,341, compared with 3,586 in 2017 and 6,427 in 2022.

On social housing, the City Council's 2023–2027 Housing Plan provides for 8,900 homes, which councillor Francisco Pomares put at 70% completion in March 2025. On that date the municipal plenary session rejected a motion by the PSOE and Con Málaga to declare the city a "stressed" rental market area, and Con Málaga pointed out that 35,000 people were waiting for social housing.

The opposition attributes the situation to municipal policy and to the mayor's inaction. De la Torre denied in 2025 that tourist apartments are the cause of the housing crisis, and in the 2026 State of the City debate he blamed the central government for the housing problems.

In July 2024, asked in an interview with Diario Sur about people who complain that they are being expelled from the city, the mayor replied that "we do not expel anyone" and that "if there is adequate mobility, people, instead of living in Málaga, where housing is more expensive, can live in Rincón de la Victoria or in Villanueva del Rosario", so that, with good public transport and roads, "the fact of not living in Málaga has a relative importance". He added that this happens in all metropolitan areas. The PSOE criticised those words. In January 2025, in the State of the City debate, he proposed a "supramunicipal vision" of housing that involves coordination with nearby municipalities such as Cártama, Torremolinos and Alhaurín de la Torre, and stated that "those who wish to come to Málaga to work and live do not necessarily have to opt for the capital". In the municipal plenary session at the end of September 2026 he stated that "the growth in the price of housing is a problem for those who do not have housing", but that "for those who have housing it is not a problem", since their property is worth more and allows them to aspire to change or improve their home. The deputy spokesperson of Con Málaga, Toni Morillas, called his words "shameful" and denounced an "absolute lack of empathy".

Housing has prompted several demonstrations in the city, including that of 29 June 2024 (about 25,000 attendees according to the organisers) and that of 27 June 2026, called by the platform Málaga para Vivir, the fourth major mobilisation since 2024, which drew about 4,500 people according to the National Police and 25,000 according to the organisers.

On 28 September 2026, after the eviction of a local resident, around a thousand people demonstrated in front of the City Hall at a rally called by the Confederation of Tenants' Unions (Confederación de Sindicatos de Inquilinas), and accused the mayor of "selling" the city. That night about ten people pitched tents in Plaza de la Constitución. On 3 October, a new march called by the Málaga Tenants' Union (Sindicato de Inquilinas de Málaga) and Un Techo por Derecho under the slogan "Towards a general strike against rentierism" drew about 8,000 people according to the National Police and 50,000 according to the Tenants' Union, and ended in Plaza de la Constitución, where more than a hundred people were then camping. The camp grew to about 140 tents and ended around 12 October, after almost two weeks, with preparations for a general strike over housing as the next step.

== Honours ==
In October 2017, De la Torre was awarded the National Order of the Legion of Honour on the 50th anniversary of Málaga's French community organisation. In November 2018, President of Russia Vladimir Putin made him the first Spanish recipient of the Medal of Pushkin, for having opened museums of Russian art in the city. After the Russian invasion of Ukraine in 2022, he faced calls to return the medal and close the museum.

In September 2021, he was appointed Honorary Officer of the Order of the British Empire (OBE), for services to bilateral relations between Málaga and the UK.
