= Celia Villalobos =

Spanish politician (born 1949)

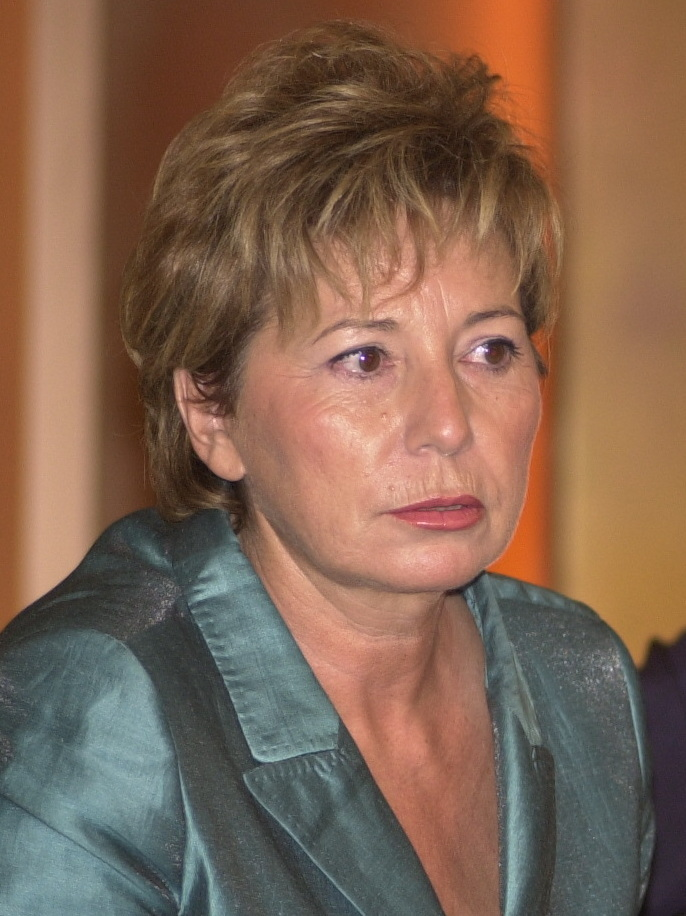

First Vice President of the Congress of Deputies
- In office 13 December 2011 – 19 July 2016
- President: Jesús Posada; Patxi López
- Preceded by: Teresa Cunillera
- Succeeded by: Ignacio Prendes

Minister of Health, Social Services and Equality
- In office 27 April 2000 – 10 July 2002
- Prime Minister: José María Aznar
- Preceded by: José Manuel Romay Beccaría
- Succeeded by: Ana Pastor Julián

Mayor of Málaga
- In office 17 June 1995 – 27 April 2000
- Preceded by: Pedro Aparicio Sánchez
- Succeeded by: Francisco de la Torre

Member of the Congress of Deputies
- In office 28 October 1989 – 5 March 2019
- Constituency: Málaga

Personal details
- Born: 18 April 1949 (age 77) Benalmádena (Málaga), Andalusia, Spain
- Party: People's Party
- Education: University of Valladolid

Celia Villalobos Talero (born 18 April 1949) is a Spanish former People's Party (PP) politician and Health Minister.

Born in Benalmádena, Province of Málaga, she was the mayor of Málaga from 1995 to 2000. She left office when she joined José María Aznar's cabinet as the minister of food and health from 2000 to 2002. Her role at this ministry was controversial, mainly due to a speech she gave during the concern over mad cow disease. However, during her period in office, the government delegated all public health responsibilities to the autonomous communities. She was deputy speaker of the Congress of Deputies between 2011 and 2016.

She is one of the most liberal members of her party. She voted in favour of same-sex marriage in 2005, for which she was economically penalised by the PP, and she left the Spanish Congress during a vote on legal abortion extension cases, which the PP opposed.
