= José Bernal =

José Bernal may refer to:

- José Bernal (artist) (1925–2010), Cuban-American artist
- José Bernal (sport shooter) (born 1927), Venezuelan sports shooter
- José Daniel Bernal (born 1973), Colombian road cyclist
- José Bernal (footballer) (born 2002), Panamanian footballer
- José Bernal (politician) (born 1974), Spanish politician
