= Enric Millo =

Spanish politician

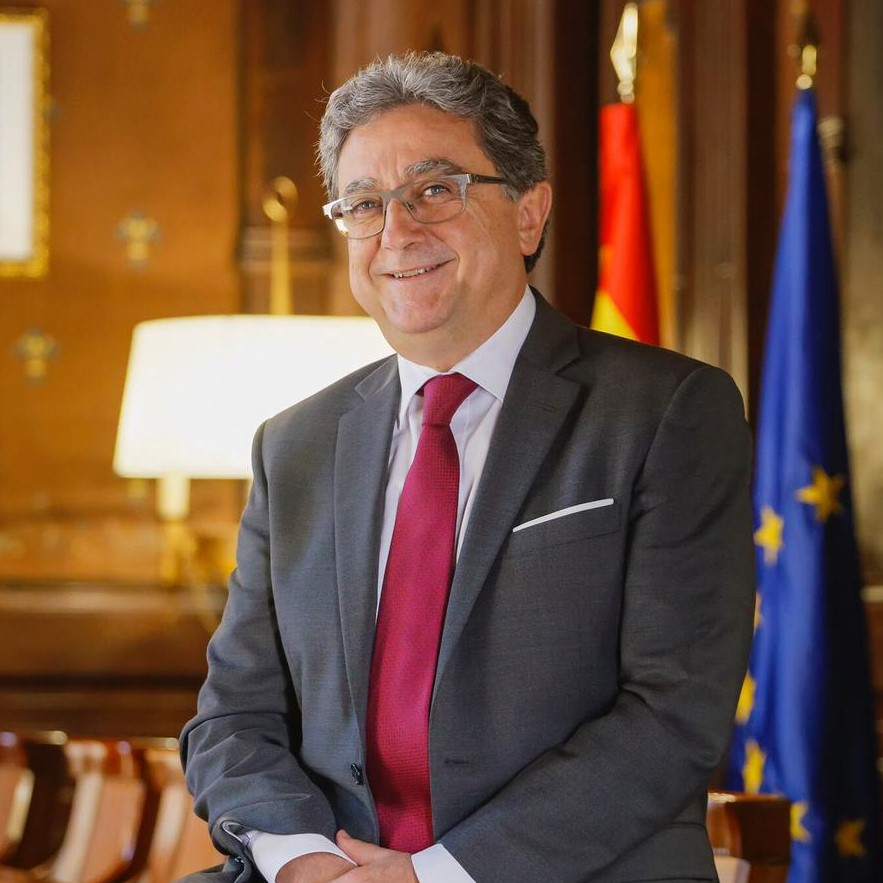

Delegate of the Spanish Government in Catalonia
- In office 21 November 2016 – 19 June 2018
- Monarch: Felipe VI
- Prime Minister: Mariano Rajoy; Pedro Sánchez
- Preceded by: María de los Llanos de Luna
- Succeeded by: Teresa Cunillera

Member of the Parliament of Catalonia for the Province of Girona
- In office 30 November 1995 – 21 November 2016

Personal details
- Born: Josep Enric Millo i Rocher; 24 November 1960 (age 65) Terrassa, Spain
- Party: Democratic Union of Catalonia (UDC); People's Party of Catalonia (PP)
- Education: Autonomous University of Barcelona
- Occupation: Economist, academic and politician

Josep Enric Millo i Rocher (born 24 November 1960), is a Spanish politician for PP.

== Biography ==
He has a degree in Economics and Business Administration from the Autonomous University of Barcelona. Professor of Economics and Organizational Structures at the Polytechnic University of Catalonia (1987–1988), and the School of Tourism (1987–1989). He served as territorial delegate of the Department of Labor of the Generalitat of Catalonia, in Girona, between 1991 and 1995.

== Career ==
Millo, who began his political career as leader of the Democratic Union of Catalonia, has been a deputy of the Parliament of Catalonia some legislatures. He was a deputy in Parliament for CiU between 1995 and 2003, and reached be the deputy speaker of the parliamentary group between 1999 and 2003. Subsequently, and when in the Catalan elections of 2003 the party decided that he was not head of the list for Girona, and went to PP. Since 2010, and until 2016, he was the spokesperson of the parliamentary group of the PPC in Parliament.

He has been a member of the Executive Committee of the PPC since 2004; Executive Secretary of Internal Communication of the PPC (2006); President of the PPC of Girona since 2008; and vice-secretary of political and economic action of the PPC since 2012.

He was the head of list of the PP in Gerona for the elections to the Parliament of Catalonia of 2010.

Deputy for Girona of the Eleventh Legislature of the Parliament of Catalonia in November 2016 was appointed Government delegate in Catalonia to replace María de los Llanos de Luna, taking office on 21. He was in office in October 2017 when the Referendum on the independence of Catalonia took place, a subsequent politically motivated general strike was enforced by the Catalan nationalist government, in protest at what it claimed to be violence in the actions of the Spanish police when carrying out the judicial orders to prevent voting. After the Catalan government declared an illegal Catalan declaration of independence and consequently the Spanish Senate imposed direct rule over Catalonia, Millo continued to have an important role. Several Catalan town councils in the hands of radical independentist movements approved motions declaring him persona non grata, such as Montblanc, Vic or Girona.

His term ended on 19 June 2018, when he was replaced by Teresa Cunillera, after Mariano Rajoy's Government was ousted following the no confidence vote against Rajoy at the motion of censure on 2 June 2018.
