= Ángel Luis González Muñoz =

Spanish politician (born 1979)

Member of the Senate
- Incumbent
- Assumed office 23 July 2023
- Constituency: Málaga

Member of the Congress of Deputies
- In office 26 April 2022 – 30 May 2023
- Preceded by: Pablo Montesinos
- Constituency: Málaga
- In office 1 April 2008 – 5 March 2019
- Constituency: Málaga

Personal details
- Born: 9 March 1979 (age 47)
- Party: People's Party

Ángel Luis González Muñoz (born 9 March 1979) is a Spanish politician serving as a member of the Senate since 2023. He was a member of the Congress of Deputies from 2008 to 2019 and from 2022 to 2023.
