= Musée Picasso Paris =

Museum in Paris, France

Coordinates: 48°51′35.03″N 2°21′44.78″E

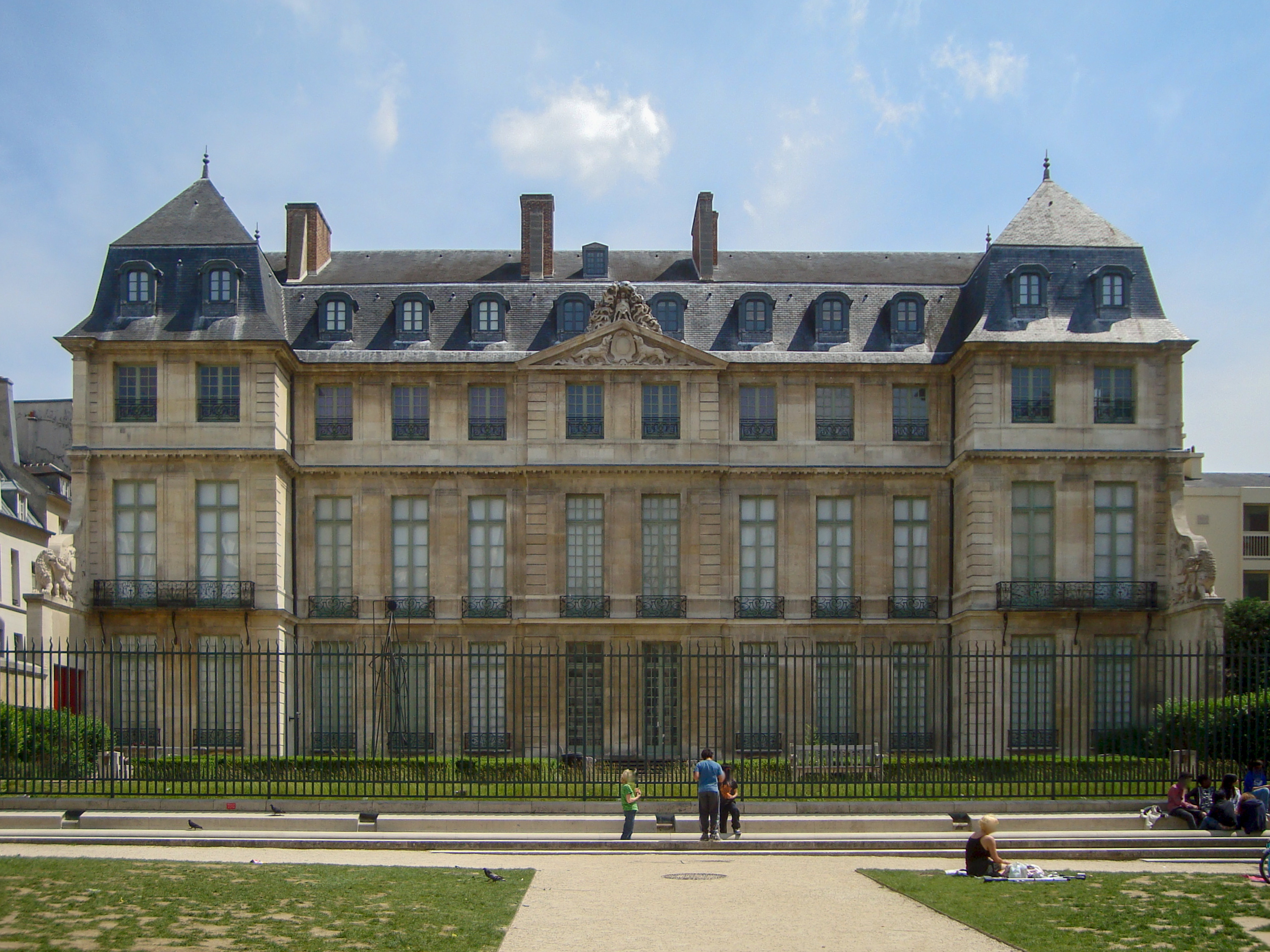
Picasso Museum, Paris (Hotel Salé, 1659)

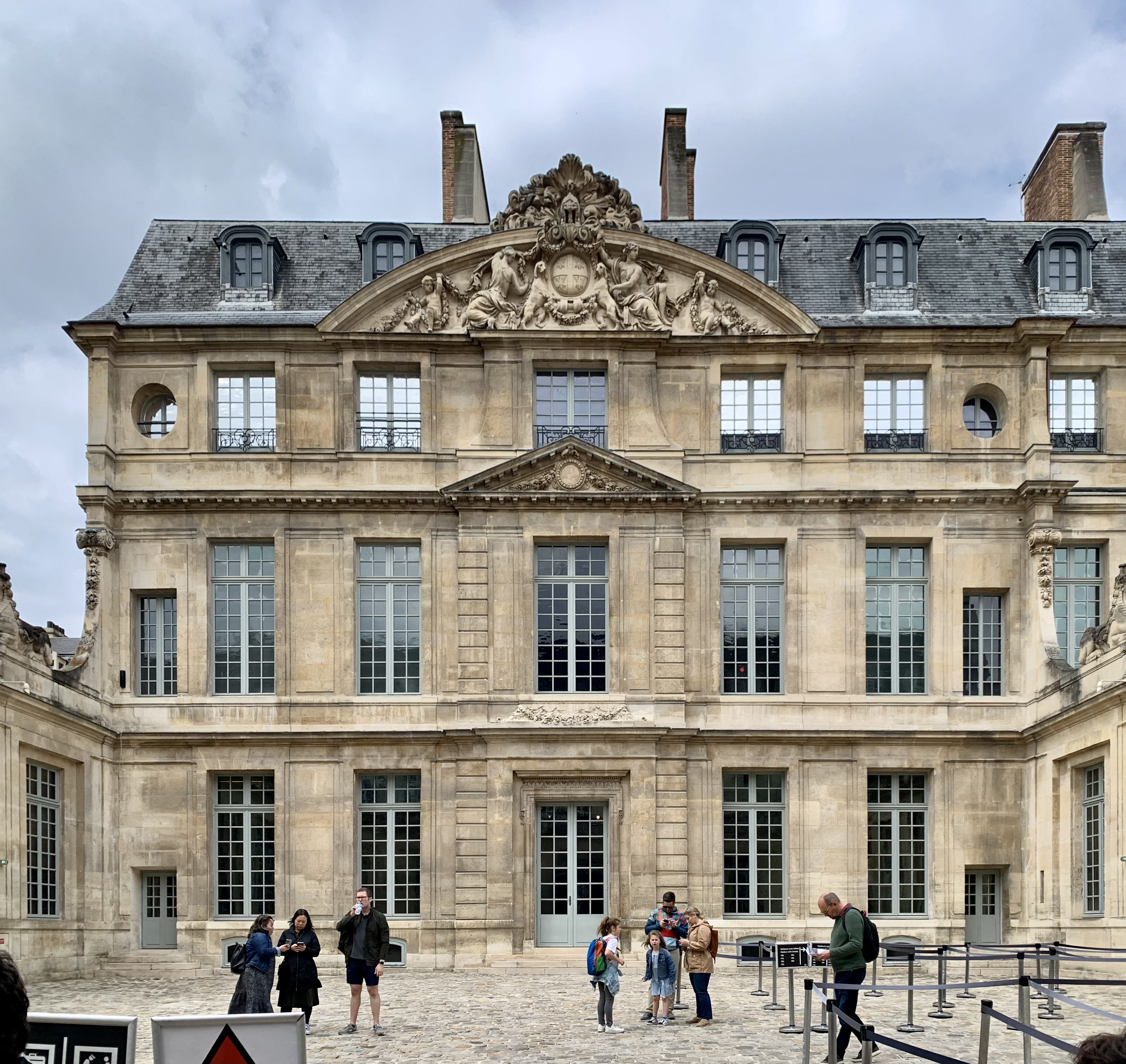
Picasso Museum, Paris, main entrance

Musée Picasso Paris (French: [myze pikaso]; English: Paris Picasso Museum) is an art gallery located in the Hôtel Salé (English: Salé Hall) on the Rue de Thorigny, in the Marais district of Paris, France, dedicated to the work of the Spanish artist Pablo Picasso (1881–1973). The museum collection includes more than 5,000 works of art including paintings, sculptures, drawings, ceramics, prints, engravings, and notebooks, as well as tens of thousands of archived pieces from Picasso's personal repository, including the artist's photographic archive, personal papers, correspondence, and author manuscripts. A large portion of items were donated by Picasso's family after his death, in accord with the wishes of the artist, who lived in France from 1905 to 1973.

== Building ==
The hôtel particulier that houses the collection was built between 1656 and 1659 for Pierre Aubert, seigneur de Fontenay, a tax farmer who became rich collecting the gabelle or salt tax (the name of the building means "salted"). The architect was Jean Boullier from Bourges. The sculpture was carried out by the brothers Gaspard and Balthazard Marsy and by Martin Desjardins.

The mansion has changed hands several times by sale or inheritance although the occupants have included the Embassy of the Republic of Venice (1671), then François de Neufville, duc de Villeroi. The mansion was expropriated by the State during the French Revolution and in 1815 it became a school, in which Balzac studied. In 1829 the mansion housed the Ecole Centrale des Arts et Manufactures. It also housed the municipal École des Métiers d'Art. It was acquired by the City of Paris in 1964, and was granted historical monument status in 1968. The mansion was restored by Bernard Vitry and Bernard Fonquernie of the Monument historique in 1974–1980.

The Hotel Salé was selected for the Musée Picasso after some contentious civic and national debate. A competition was held to determine who would design the facilities. The proposal from Roland Simounet was selected in 1976 from amongst the four that were submitted. Other proposals were submitted by Roland Castro and the GAU (Groupement pour l'Architecture et l'Urbanisme), Jean Monge, and Carlo Scarpa. For the most part, the interior of the mansion (which had undergone significant modifications) was restored to its former spacious state.

== Collection ==
=== Formation of the collection ===
Pablo Picasso, 1918, Portrait d'Olga dans un fauteuil (Olga in an Armchair), oil on canvas, 130 × 88.8 cm

In 1968, France created a law that permitted heirs to pay inheritance taxes with works of art instead of money, as long as the art is considered an important contribution to the French cultural heritage. This is known as a dation, and it is allowable only in exceptional circumstances. Dominique Bozo, a curator of national museums, selected those works that were to become the dation Picasso. This selection was reviewed by Jean Leymarie and ratified in 1979. It contained work by Picasso in all techniques and from all periods, and is especially rare in terms of its excellent collection of sculptures. Upon Jacqueline Picasso's death in 1986, her daughter offered to pay inheritance taxes by a new dation. The collection has also acquired a number of works through purchases and gifts.

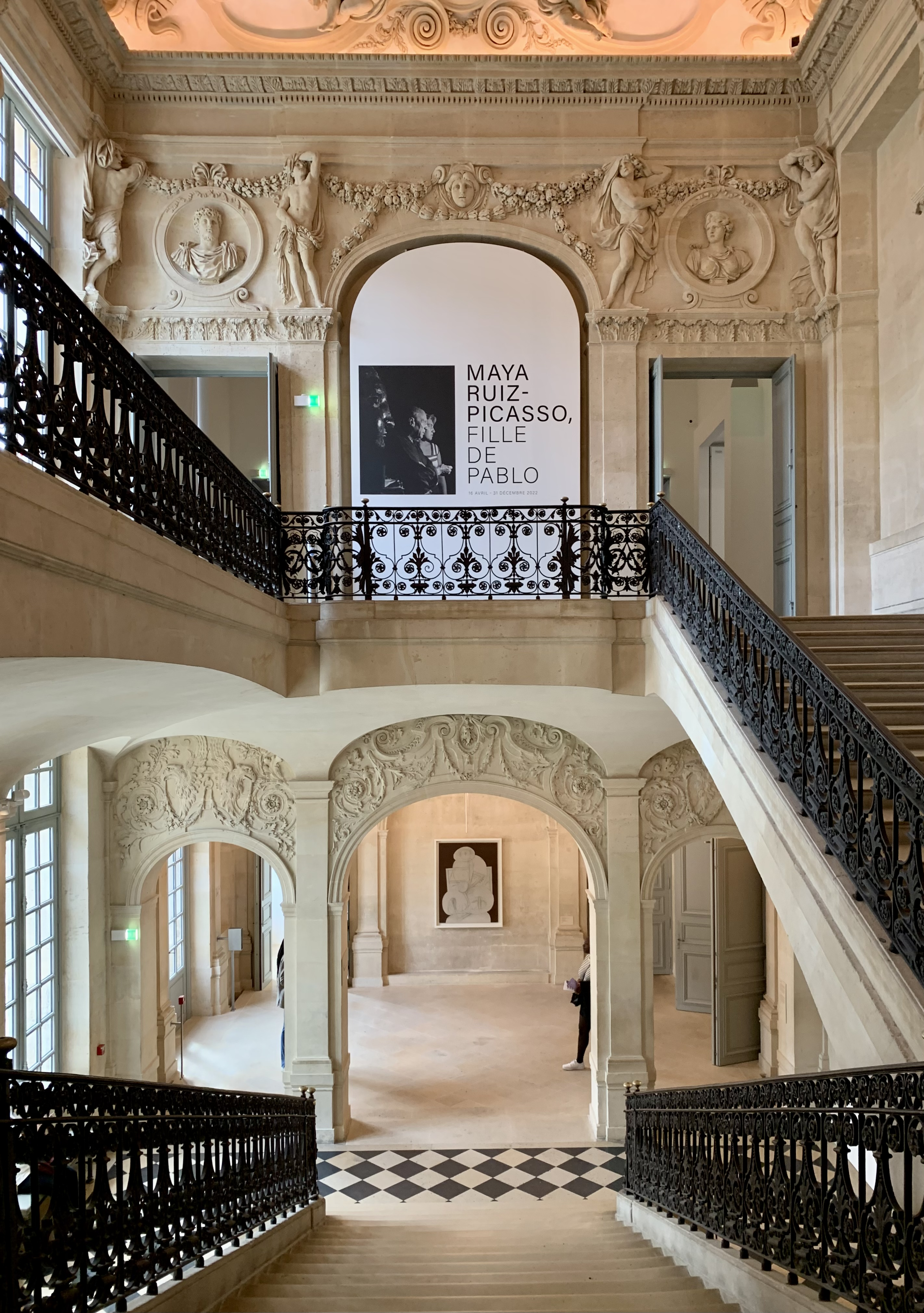
Stair hall (escalier d'honneur) of the Hôtel Salé

Picasso once said "I am the greatest collector of Picassos in the world." He had amassed an enormous collection of his own work by the time of his death in 1973, ranging from sketchbooks to finished masterpieces. The Musée Picasso has over 5,000 works of art by Picasso including 3,700 works on paper, ceramics, sculptures in wood and metal, and paintings. This is complemented by Picasso's own personal art collection of works by other artists, including Renoir, Cézanne, Degas, Rousseau, Seurat, de Chirico and Matisse. It also contains some Iberian bronzes and a good collection of African art, by which Picasso was greatly inspired. The museum also contains a large number of works that Picasso painted after his seventieth birthday.

=== Presentation of the works ===
There are a few rooms with thematic presentations, but the museum largely follows a chronological sequence, displaying painting, drawings, sculptures and prints. Other items include photographs, manuscripts, newspaper clippings and photographs to provide additional contextual information. The museum has also made an effort to present works by cartoonists who mocked or caricatured Picasso's work from the 1950s.

The second floor has a special area set aside for temporary exhibitions and prints. The third floor contains the library, the documentation and archives department (reserved for research), and the curator's offices.

== Management ==
=== Funding ===
More than 5,000 works were donated by Picasso's family after his death in 1973 under a law permitting heirs to contribute art in lieu of tax payments. More donations came from the estate of Picasso's last wife, Jacqueline Roque, and from Anne Sinclair, a museum board member. Since 1985 more than 1,000 exhibits have been bought by the museum.

In a period of economic crisis and government cutbacks on funding for culture, longtime director Anne Baldassari still managed to raise $41 million for the makeover by exporting artworks for exhibition abroad. The Musée Picasso raised between €1 million and €3.5 million a year between 2008 and 2011 from the touring exhibition "Masterpieces from the Picasso Museum". The tour helped fund the refurbishment of the museum and included the De Young Museum, San Francisco, where attendance topped 335,000, the Chinese Pavilion, Shanghai, the Art Gallery of New South Wales, Sydney, the Art Gallery of Ontario, Toronto, and the Palazzo Reale, Milan. Upon re-opening, the museum is expected to finance more than 60 percent of its annual budget.

=== Governance ===
In 2014, Baldassari was dismissed by Aurélie Filippetti, the French minister of culture, after mounting criticism of her management. New director Laurent Le Bon reopened the museum in September 2014 following a €52 million five-year renovation dogged by delays and escalating costs.

=== Expansion ===
By the end of the ongoing construction work, the museum's public space was to nearly triple, to around 58,000 square feet, by moving staff offices to a newly purchased building. The expansion project, whose budget doubled to almost $70 million, was supposed to be completed in two years when it began in 2009. But as it grew in scope and size, reopening dates were announced and delayed several times.

After a five-year closure the museum reopened on 25 October 2014.

== See also ==
- Museu Picasso (Barcelona)
- Museo Picasso Málaga
- List of single-artist museums
