= Alain Seban =

French cultural institution head

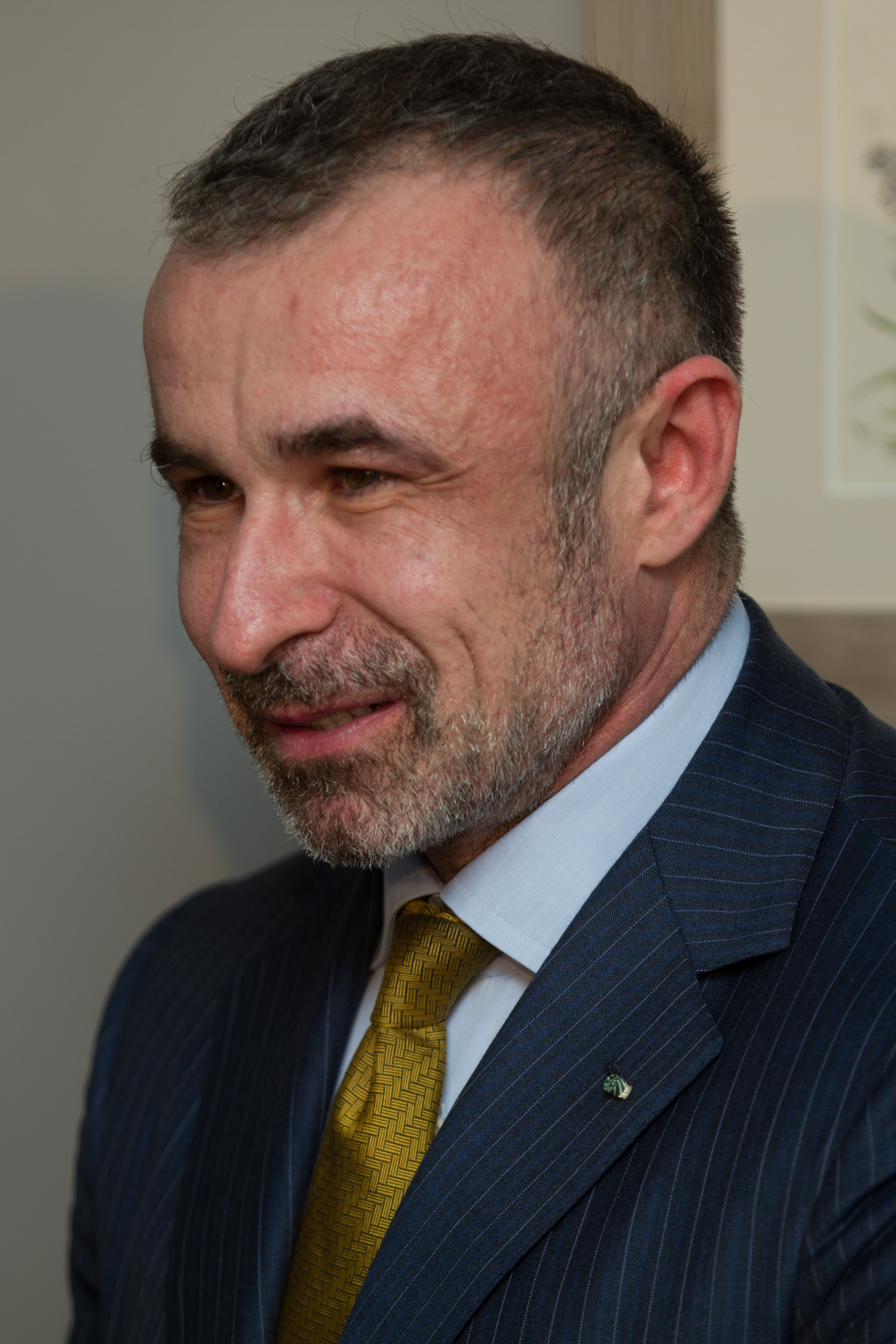
Seban in 2014

Alain Pierre Seban (born 15 July 1964) is a French cultural institution head and senior official. He was the president of the Pompidou Centre in Paris until February 2015. As such, he also heads three organisations linked to the Pompidou Centre: the Centre Pompidou-Metz, the Bibliothèque publique d’information (Bpi – a vast public library) and the IRCAM (Institut de recherché et coordination accoustique/musique).

== Biography ==
Born in Toulouse, Alain Seban graduated from the École Polytechnique (X83), the ENSAE ParisTech and the Institut d'Études Politiques de Paris.

On graduating from the National School of Administration (ENA) in 1991, Seban was appointed as auditor at the French Council of State. At the same time, he was legal adviser to the heritage director of the Ministry of Culture, rapporteur on the Picq Mission on the State's responsibilities and organisation, member of the Mobilier National control board, and Secretary General of the mission for the Institut national d’histoire de l’Art, led by Michel Laclotte, honorary director of the Louvre museum.

Alain Seban was made a "maître des requêtes" at the Council of State in 1994, and appointed to Minister of Culture Philippe Douste-Blazy's Private Office in 1995 within which he was responsible for museums, heritage, architecture, archives, legal counsel, and copyright law. Seban returned to the Council of State in 1997, and was made attorney general within the Court.

Alongside his role at the Council of State, Alain Seban served on the board of the pension fund for National Paris Opera staff and on the board of the pension fund for Comédie Française staff, and as was an alternate member of the Polling Commission. Alain Seban was also a member of the mission for the Quai Branly Museum, and then legal advisor to the museum's president from 1997 to 2002 Alain Seban also lectured at the ENA from 1996 to 1999.

In 2002, Alain Seban joined the Private Office of the Minister of Foreign Affairs Dominique de Villepin as special advisor attached to the Minister, and was notably in charge of international cultural relations. He then became director of Media within the Prime Minister's office in 2002 and held the position until May 2005. As such, he was notably in charge of reforming media support, took part to the implementation of the international news channel (that later became France 24) and to the deployment of digital terrestrial television; he was also in charge of the transposition of the EU directives regarding the "telecom package" and of the reform of sectors banned from television advertising.

He then became Advisor for Culture and the Media, and then Advisor for Education and Culture to the President of the Republic Jacques Chirac. As such, he was notably responsible for the supervision of the negotiation of the inter-governmental agreement regarding the Louvre Abu Dhabi and the opening of the Musée du Quai Branly in 2006.

He replaced Bruno Racine as President of the Georges-Pompidou Centre for five years from 2 April 2007 and was, at the same time, promoted as Councillor of State in ordinary. He focused on providing the centre with a strategic plan which was approved in the autumn of 2007 and was built on President Georges Pompidou's founding vision: "the ambition to create an interface between the community and creation, with the conviction that a nation which opens up to the art of its time is more creative, more agile, stronger". This plan is based on three main priorities:

- Making the museum "global, because art is now global" by "developing global information and support networks (...) relying on an increased emphasis on research;"
- "Finding a prospective dimension within the institution, a laboratory open to the most varied experiences and experiments, by taking advantage of the institution’s founding multi-disciplinary aspect, which constitutes a unique asset provided it is put at the service of the practices and desires of today’s creators;"
- "Broaden the audience, because the Pompidou Centre’s core mission is to circulate contemporary creation within the community and aims much beyond the narrow circle of specialists".

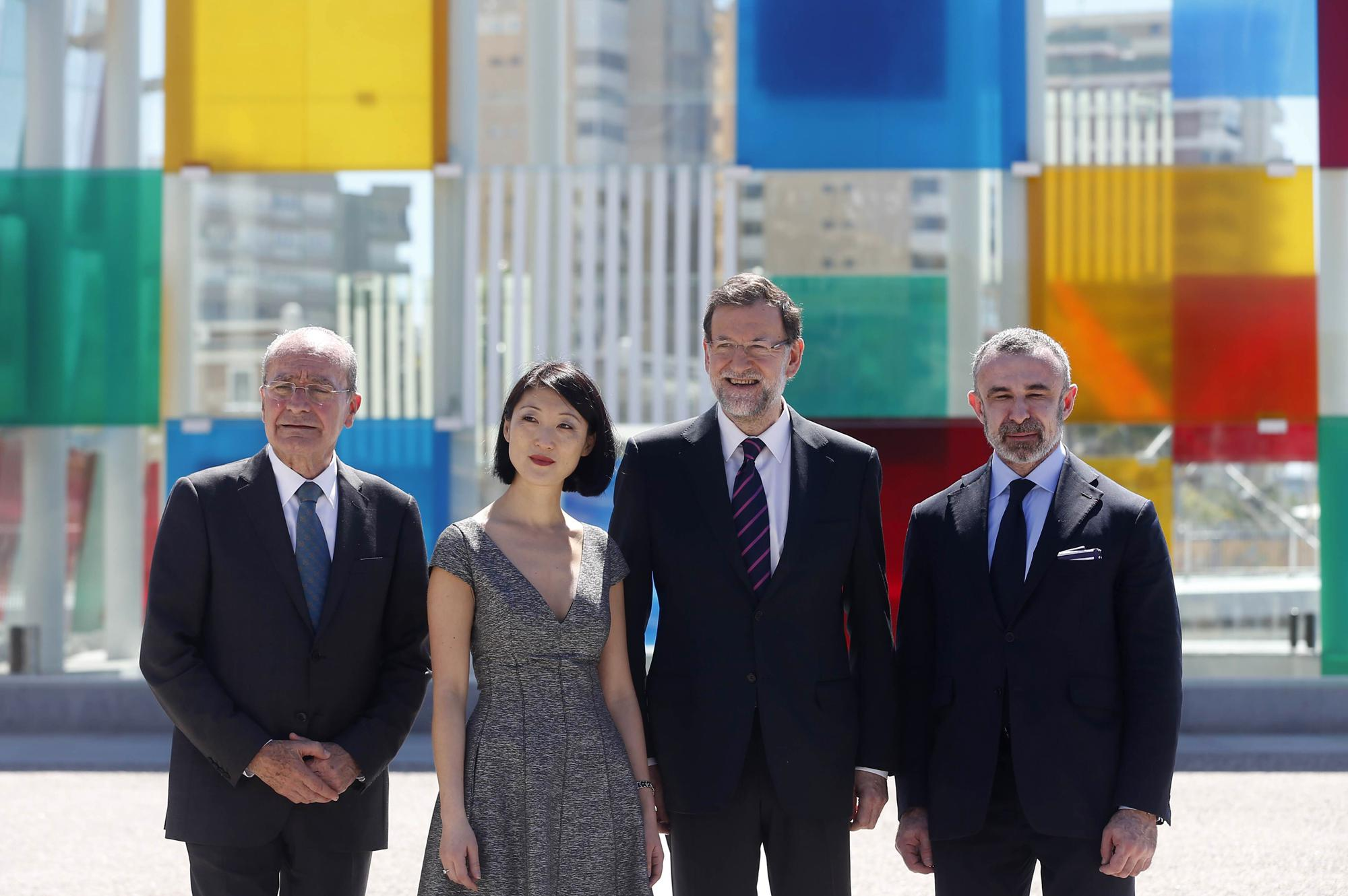
From right to left: Seban, Mariano Rajoy, Fleur Pellerin and Francisco de la Torre at the opening of the Centre Pompidou in Málaga, Spain in March 2015

Within the frame of this strategic plan, the Pompidou Centre, on the initiative of Alain Seban, developed several "strategic projects" financed by the development of patronage: the Nouveau Festival, launched in October 2009 and which second edition took place in February 2011; the Centre Pompidou-Metz, opened in May 2010, which was the first instance of the devolving of a national cultural institution; the Studio 13/16, opened in September 2010; as the first space devoted to teenagers within a cultural institution; the "Paris-Delhi-Bombay..." exhibition scheduled in May 2011, that stages a dialogue between the contemporary Indian and French scenes; the Centre Pompidou Virtuel, a new platform for the delivery of digital content related to modern and contemporary art; the Centre Pompidou Mobile, which first exhibition in Chaumont (Haute-Marne) attracted 29,000 visitors in two months and a half (for 23,000 inhabitants).

Under his leadership, the centre's project of creating a new exhibition space devoted to French artists in the basement of the Palais de Tokyo was turned down by Minister for Culture and Communication Christine Albanel, who favoured the extension of the already existing contemporary art space, nevertheless the number of visitors coming to the Centre spectacularly increased, reaching 3.6 million in 2011 (+40% between 2007 and 2011), notably thanks to large exhibitions such as those devoted to Kandisky, Calder, Soulages, Lucian Freud or Mondrian/de Stijl, and to a significant increase of its own resources (+50% between 2007 and 2009). In 2009, the centre renewed the presentation of its contemporary collections with elles@pompidou, exclusively devoted to female artists, which attracted 2.5 million visitors until it was renewed in February 2011.

On 29 February 2012, Seban was reappointed at the head of the organisation. During his second tenure, he implements a concept of satellite institutions, set in existing venues in France or abroad, with a limited in time cooperation with the Pompidou in Paris. The first of these institutions opens in Málaga (Spain) on 28 March 2015, a few days before the end of his second term as president of the Pompidou. He's succeeded by Serge Lasvignes, and takes back his position at the Council of State as senior judge.

He chairs the National Disciplinary Board of Physicians since 2018, while retaining his position at the Council of State. He is appointed president of the 2nd chamber of the Council of State in november 2025.

== Honours ==
- Commandeur des Arts et des Lettres (France), 2002
- Chevalier de la Légion d'honneur (France), 2011
- Commander of the Royal Norwegian Order of Merit (Norway), 2015
- Officer of the Ordre national du Mérite (France), 2019
- Commander of the Order of Civil Merit (Spain), 2021

== Sources ==
- Who's who
- Alain SEBAN, directeur du développement des médias de septembre 2002 à mars 2005
