= Meritxell Batet =

Spanish politician (born 1973)

The Most Excellent Meritxell Batet MP
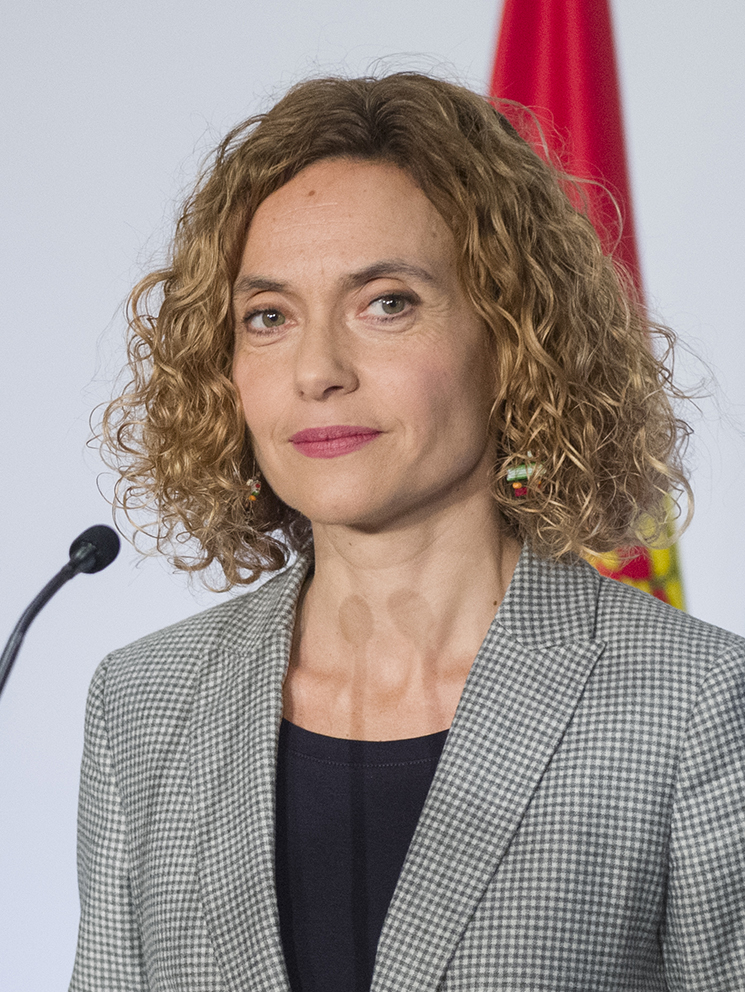

President of the Congress of Deputies
- In office 21 May 2019 – 16 August 2023
- Monarch: Felipe VI
- Preceded by: Ana Pastor Julián
- Succeeded by: Francina Armengol

Minister for Territorial Policy and Civil Service of Spain
- In office 7 June 2018 – 20 May 2019
- Monarch: Felipe VI
- Prime Minister: Pedro Sánchez
- Preceded by: Soraya Sáenz de Santamaría (Territorial Policy); Cristóbal Montoro (Civil Service)
- Succeeded by: Luis Planas

Member of the Congress of Deputies
- In office 21 May 2019 – 6 September 2023
- Constituency: Barcelona
- In office 13 July 2016 – 15 June 2018
- Constituency: Barcelona
- In office 13 January 2016 – 19 July 2016
- Constituency: Madrid
- In office 2 April 2004 – 13 January 2016
- Constituency: Barcelona

Personal details
- Born: 19 March 1973 (age 53) Barcelona, Catalonia, Spain
- Party: PSC-PSOE (2008–present)
- Spouse: José María Lassalle (m. 2005; div. 2016)
- Children: 2
- Education: Pompeu Fabra University
- Occupation: Jurist, academic and politician

Meritxell Batet Lamaña (Catalan pronunciation: [məɾiˈtʃeʎ βəˈtɛt]; born 19 March 1973) is a Spanish jurist, politician, and member of the Socialists' Party of Catalonia (PSC), who served as President of the Congress of Deputies from 2019 to 2023. Prior to this, she served as Minister for Territorial Policy and Civil Service of the Government of Spain between June 2018 and May 2019.

A lecturer of Constitutional Law at Pompeu Fabra University, she has been a member of the Socialist Parliamentary Group in the 8th through 14th terms of the lower house.

== Early years and academic career ==
Batet studied at the Gravi School in Barcelona and entered the university with the support of scholarships. In 1995 she graduated in Law from the Pompeu Fabra University where she also took doctorate courses, and presented her thesis Participation, deliberation and transparency in the institutions and bodies of the European Union. In 1998 she completed a postgraduate course in real estate and urban development law at IDEC. In 2013 she presented her doctoral thesis project entitled The principle of subsidiarity in Spain.

From 1995 to 1998, she was a professor of Administrative Law at Pompeu Fabra University and was a professor of Constitutional Law until her appointment as Minister in 2018. In 2007 she received a German Marshall scholarship to stay in the United States and visit various social centers, universities and democratic institutions in different cities.

== Member of the Congress of Deputies ==
Her first contact with politics was during her student years. She explained in interviews that when she obtained a scholarship from the Generalitat to study for her doctorate at university, her thesis supervisor, Josep Mir, told her that Narcís Serra, then first secretary of the PSC, was looking for someone to coordinate his secretariat who was not a party militant but an independent. Batet collaborated with him for two years. From 2001 to 2004 she directed the Carles Pi i Sunyer Foundation for Autonomous and Local Studies.

In 2004, she ran as an independent in the ninth position on the Barcelona list of the Socialist Party of Catalonia for the Congress of Deputies, headed by José Montilla, and was elected member of parliament for Barcelona. In 2008 she joined the PSC where she works in the Gràcia group of the Barcelona Federation.

In the 2008 general election she was ranked eleventh on the list for Barcelona and renewed her seat, as well as in the 2011 general election in which she was ranked number eight.

In February 2013 she broke the voting discipline of the socialist group together with other members of the PSC by voting in the Congress of Deputies in favor of two initiatives presented by CiU and La Izquierda Plural (a coalition of IU and ICV with EUiA and CHA) to allow the holding of a referendum in Catalonia on its future relationship with the rest of Spain. The socialist group fined undisciplined deputies with 600 euros.

In July 2014, she was appointed Secretary of Studies and Programs in the Federal Executive Commission of the Spanish Socialist Workers' Party (PSOE), assuming her first position in the organization.

In the 2015 general election, she was number two on the PSOE list for Madrid despite being a PSC militant, in tandem with Secretary-General Pedro Sánchez. In addition to coordinating the electoral program for the elections, Sánchez entrusted her with the coordination of the team of experts that outlined its proposal for reforming the Constitution.

In February 2016, she was one of the people chosen by Sánchez to negotiate with other political forces in an attempt to set up an alternative government alliance to the People's Party (PP).

In April 2016, she agreed to head the PSC's list for Barcelona in the general election called for the month of June, following the resignation of Carme Chacón as a candidate again. In May 2016, it was confirmed that Batet would be a candidate without primaries after Carles Martí resigned as an alternate candidate. She was one of 15 PSOE-PSC deputies to vote against the investiture of Mariano Rajoy following the elections.

== Minister for Territorial Policy and Civil Service ==
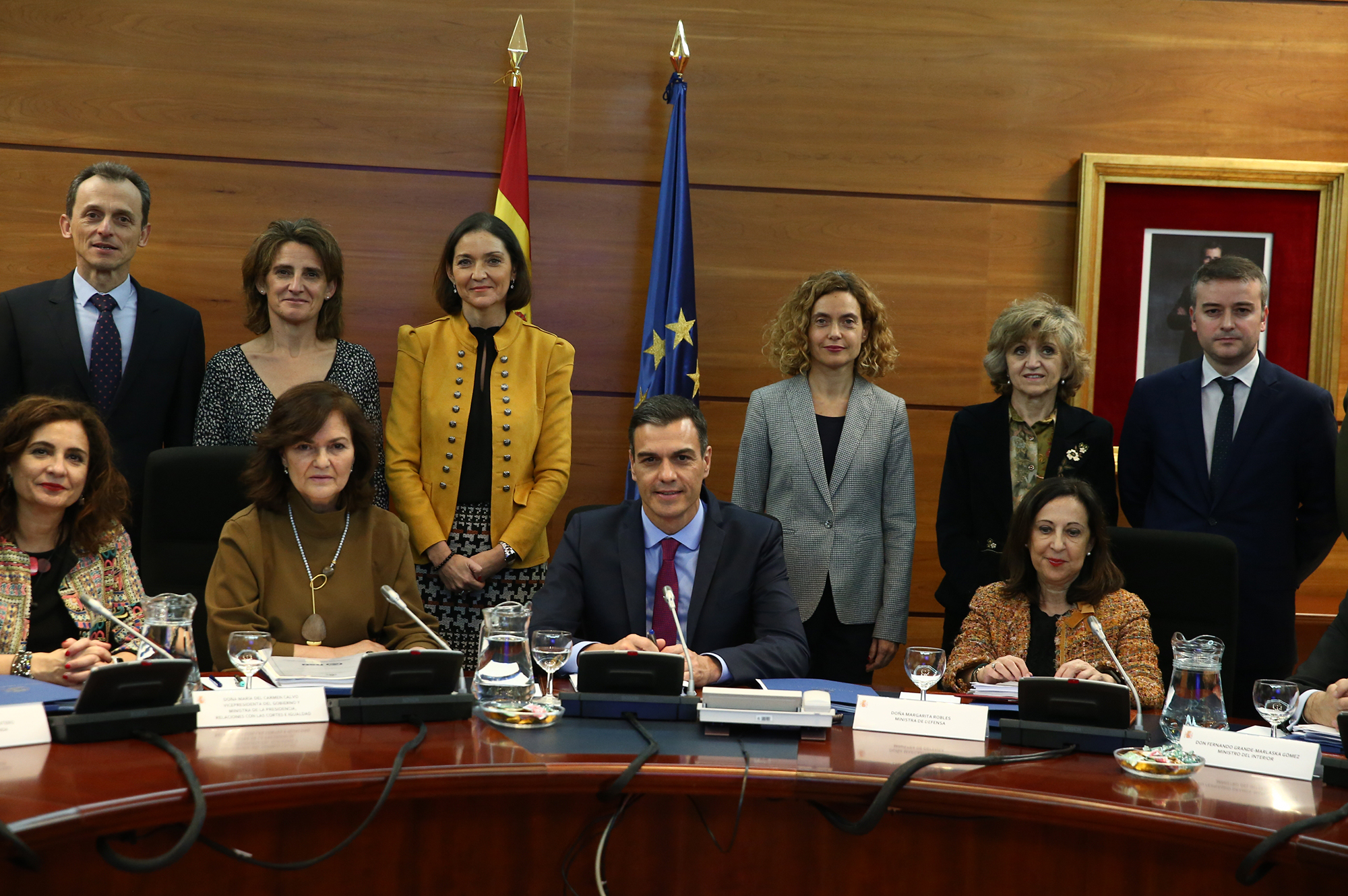
While she was minister, Batet was part of the National Security Council.

In June 2018, following the motion of censure that the PSOE presented against the PP government of Mariano Rajoy, which was approved by the Congress of Deputies on 1 June, the new Spanish Prime Minister, Pedro Sánchez, appointed her as a minister in the new Spanish government.

Felipe VI formally appointed her by royal decree on 6 June as holder of the portfolio of Minister for Territorial Policy and Civil Service. On 7 June she took office as Minister before the King at the Palace of Zarzuela. At the request of the Prime Minister and to focus solely on government work, Batet resigned from parliament after more than 14 years of service on 15 June.

She stepped down from the ministry on 20 May 2019 in order to lead the Congress of Deputies.

== President of the Congress of Deputies ==
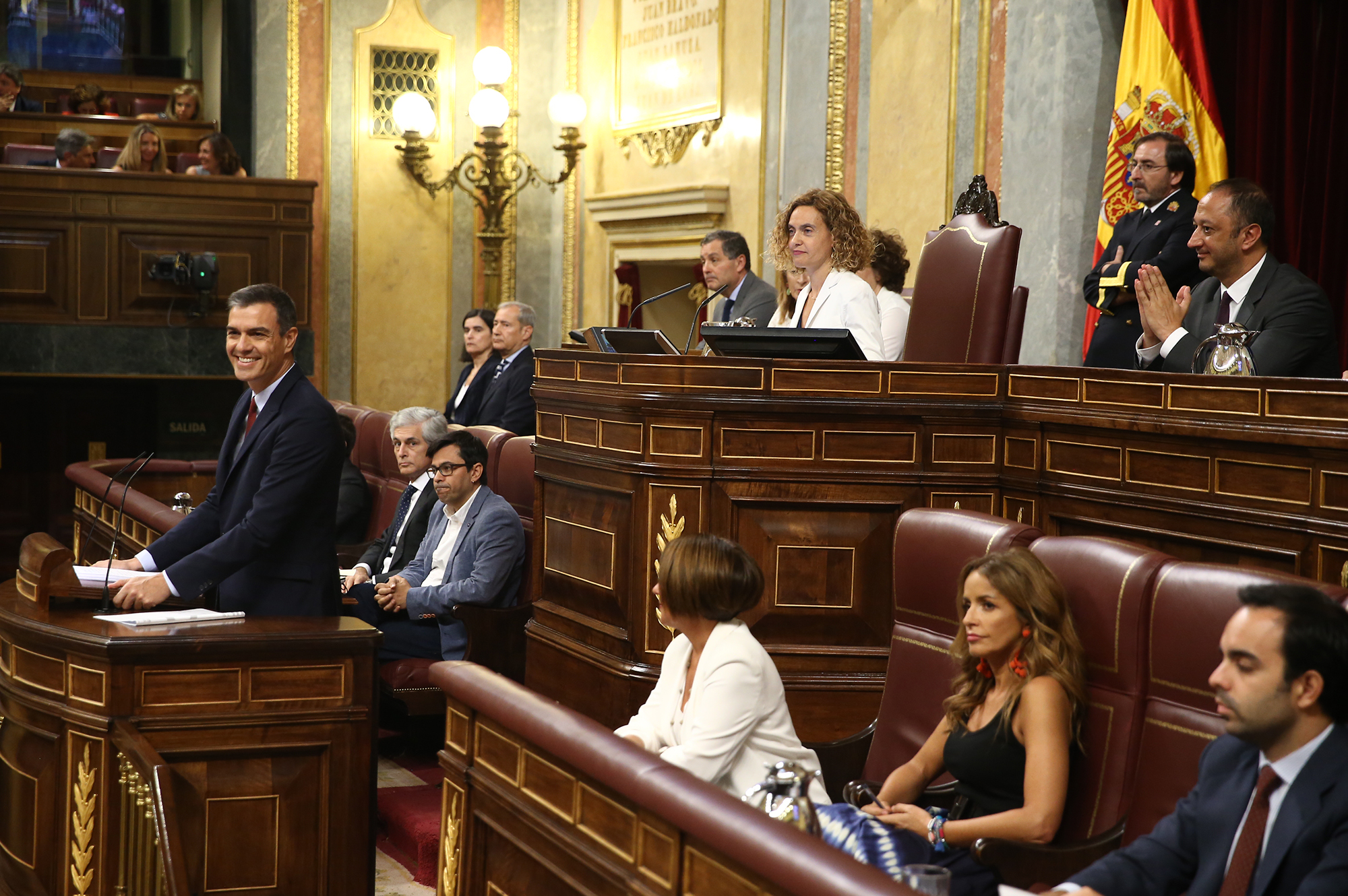
Meritxell Batet chairing over the investiture session of Pedro Sánchez in July 2019.

Batet was elected Member of the Congress of Deputies again in the April 2019 general election. On 17 May 2019, the PSOE, winner of the election, announced that it would present Batet as its candidate to be the next speaker (president) of the lower house.

The Cortes Generales opening sessions were held on 21 May and as expected Batet was elected president. She was elected with the support of her party, the left-wing Unidas Podemos and other minority parties such as the Basque Nationalist Party, Compromís, the Canarian Coalition, and the Regionalist Party of Cantabria.

The 13th Cortes Generales was disbanded on 24 September 2019 due to the impossibility of forming a government. Batet was re-elected in the November 2019 general election and the PSOE presented her as its candidate for president of Congress. She received the trust of the lower house again in December 2019, being re-elected president.

== Personal life ==
In August 2005, in the Cantabrian town of Santillana del Mar, she married José María Lassalle, a member of parliament for Cantabria of the PP, with whom she has two twin daughters. They divorced eleven years later, in May 2016. Lassalle was appointed by PM Mariano Rajoy as State Secretary for Culture in December 2011.

=== Health ===
On 27 December 2021, Batet tested positive for COVID-19 amidst the Deltacron hybrid variant surging in Spain.

== Publications ==
- E. Niubó, M. Batet, J. Majó, Europa, Federalisme, Socialdemocràcia XXI, Fundació Rafael Campalans, Barcelona, 2012.
- L’esperança cívica d’Europa. Reflexions sobre el paper de la ciutadania a partir de la nova Constitució Europea. Publicado en FRC Revista de Debat Polític, primavera 10, 2005.
- Indicadores de gestión de servicios públicos locales. Document Pi i Sunyer número 25, Fundació Carles Pi i Sunyer, Barcelona 2004
- Indicadors de gestió de serveis públics locals: una iniciativa des de Catalunya. En Evaluación y control de políticas públicas. Indicadores de gestión. Ayuntamiento de Gijón, 2002

Political offices
Preceded by Soraya Sáenz de Santamaría as Minister of Territorial Administrations	Minister of Territorial Policy and Civil Service; 2018–2019	Succeeded by Luis Planas
Preceded by Cristóbal Montoro as Minister of Civil Service	Minister of Territorial Policy and Civil Service; 2018–2019	Succeeded by Luis Planas
Preceded by Ana Pastor Julián	President of the Congress of Deputies; 2019–present	Incumbent
