= Diego Movellán =

Spanish politician (born 1979)

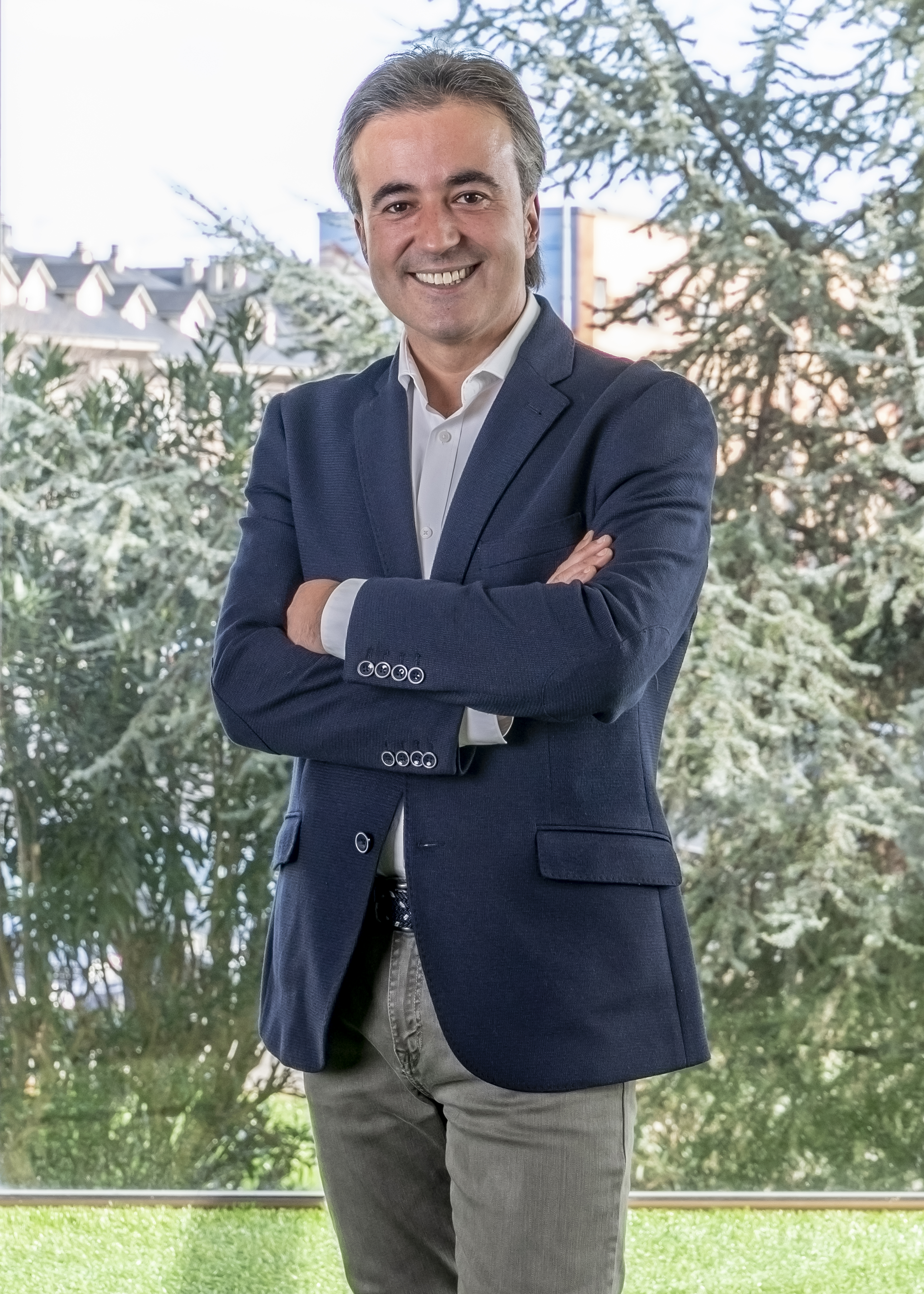
- Diego Movellán in 2019

Mayor of Camargo
- Incumbent
- Assumed office June 17, 2023
- Preceded by: Esther Bolado
- In office July 1, 2011 – June 13, 2015
- Preceded by: Ángel Duque
- Succeeded by: Esther Bolado

Member of Congress
- Incumbent
- Assumed office December 13, 2016

Personal details
- Born: Diego Movellán Lombilla; July 1, 1979 Camargo, Spain
- Party: PP
- Occupation: Politician

Diego Movellán Lombilla (Camargo, July 1, 1979) is a Spanish politician, currently serving as the Mayor of Camargo. He also served as a member of Congress of Deputies of Spain representing Cantabria during the 12th, 13th, and 14th legislatures.

== Biography ==
Diego Movellán Lombilla was born and raised in the Cantabrian municipality of Camargo.

He began his political career in the New Generations of the People's Party (PP) of Cantabria, where he served as president from 2005 to 2013. Between 2003 and 2011, he was a councilor in the City Council of Camargo and from 2011 to 2015, he was the mayor of the same municipality after winning the elections with an absolute majority; he currently serves as the spokesperson for the People's Party of Cantabria.

In December 2016, he replaced José María Lassalle in the Congress of Deputies, who was appointed Secretary of State for the Information Society. On March 15, 2019, his candidacy for the Congress of Deputies as the head of the list of the People's Party of Cantabria was made public.

He is a member of the Regional Executive Committee of Cantabria. Also, since the 19th National Congress of the People's Party in July 2018, Diego Movellán was also part of the National Executive Committee of the PP as Secretary of Membership until 2022, when after one of the party's biggest internal crises, President Pablo Casado resigned and was succeeded by a new board led by Alberto Núñez Feijóo from which Diego Movellán is not a part.

Since June 17, 2023, he assumed the position of mayor of Camargo after winning the municipal elections on May 28, 2023, by an absolute majority.
