= José María Lassalle =

Spanish Lecturer and essayist

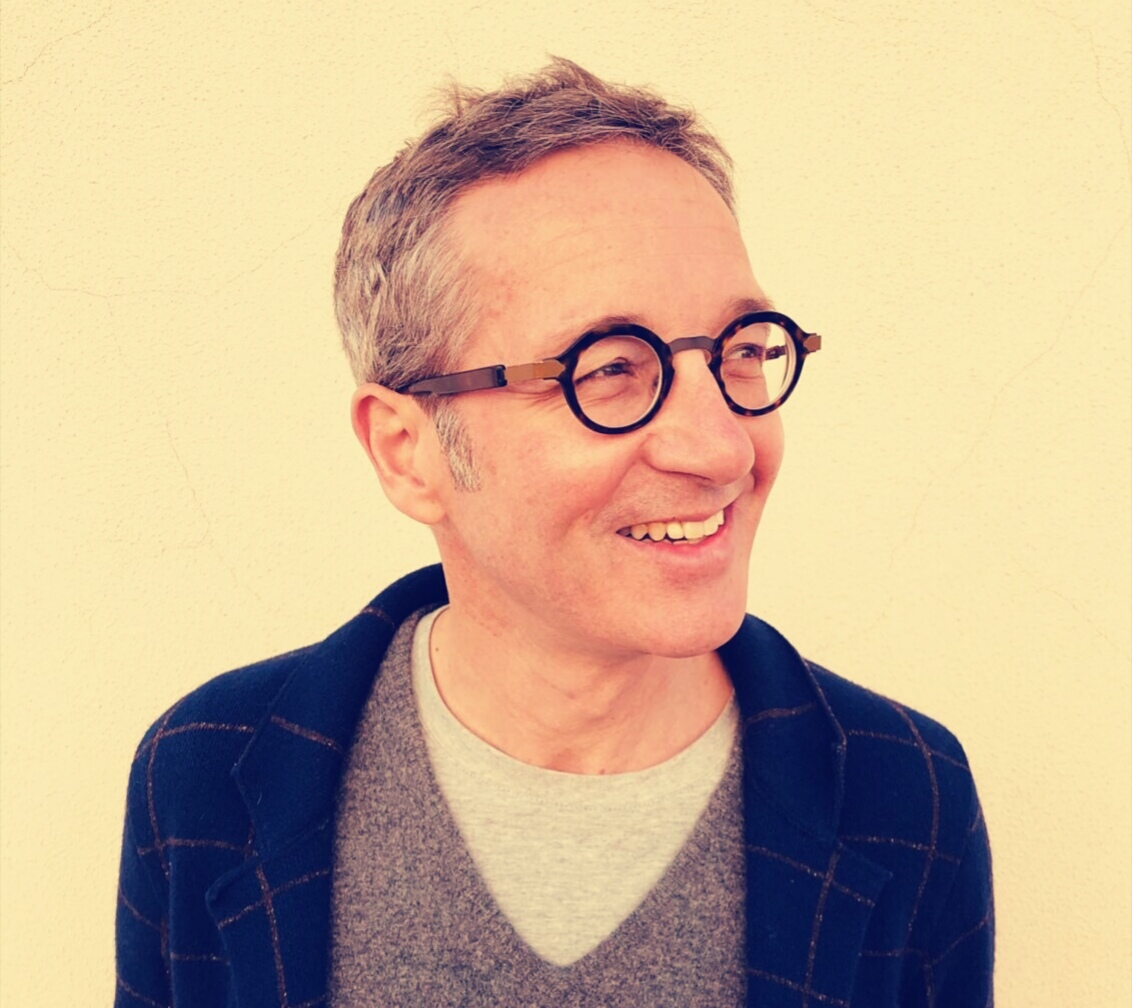
- Born: 23 October 1966 (age 59); Santander

Academic background
- Education: University of Cantabria
- Thesis: John Locke y los fundamentos modernos de la propiedad
- Doctoral advisor: Jesús Ignacio Martínez García

José María Lassalle Ruiz (born 1966) is a Spanish lecturer, essayist and former politician.

== Biography ==
Lassalle was born on 23 October 1966 in Santander. He earned a PhD in Law in 1999 at the University of Cantabria, reading a dissertation titled John Locke y los fundamentos modernos de la propiedad, supervised by Jesús Ignacio Martínez García and dealing with the aforementioned philosopher.

He worked as a predoctoral and post-doctoral researcher for the University of Cantabria (1996–2001), and as a lecturer for the Charles III University of Madrid (UC3M; 2001–2003). Following a spell as director of the Ministry of Foreign Affairs' Foundation Carolina (2003–2004), he has also worked as lecturer at the Universidad CEU San Pablo, the Rey Juan Carlos University and the Universidad Pontificia Comillas. Lassalle married Meritxell Batet in August 2005, from whom he divorced in 2016. A member of the 8th, 9th, 10th, 11th and 12th terms of the Congress of Deputies in representation of Cantabria, elected within the People's Party (PP) lists, he renounced to his seat at the Lower House of the Spanish parliament in December 2016. He was replaced then by Diego Movellán.

Lassalle served as Secretary of State for Culture (2011–2016). During his spell at the Casa de las Siete Chimeneas, he faced trouble to pass a Law for Patronage and to get through the debate on the cultural VAT. Replaced by Fernando Benzo in November 2016, he was then appointed as new Secretary of State for Information Society and Digital Agenda, tasked with defining the new digital agenda of Spain.

== Electoral history ==
Electoral history of José María Lassalle
Election	List	Constituency	List position	Result	Ref.
2004 general election (Congress of Deputies)	PP	Cantabria	3rd (out of 5)	Elected	
2008 general election (Congress of Deputies)	PP	Cantabria	2nd (out of 5)	Elected	
2011 general election (Congress of Deputies)	PP	Cantabria	2nd (out of 5)	Elected	
2015 general election (Congress of Deputies)	PP	Cantabria	2nd (out of 5)	Elected	
2016 general election (Congress of Deputies)	PP	Cantabria	2nd (out of 5)	Elected	

== Works ==
Books

- — (2001). John Locke y los fundamentos modernos de la propiedad. Madrid: Dykinson.
- — (2003). Locke, liberalismo y propiedad. Madrid: Servicio de Estudios del Colegio de Registradores.
- — (2010). Liberales. Compromiso cívico con la virtud. Barcelona: Debate.
- — (2017). Contra el populismo. Cartografía de un totalitarismo posmoderno. Barcelona: Debate.
- — (2019). Ciberleviatán. El colapso de la democracia liberal frente a la revolución digital. Barcelona: Arpa.
