= María de los Llanos de Luna =

Spanish politician and lawyer

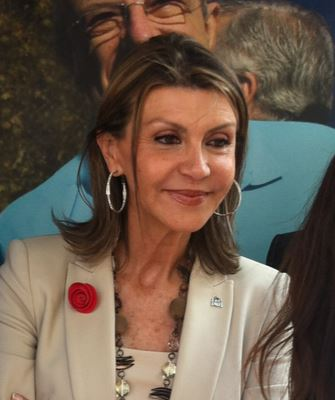

Member of the Congress of Deputies for Barcelona
- Incumbent
- Assumed office 3 December 2019

Delegate of the Spanish Government in Catalonia
- In office 30 December 2011 – 21 November 2016
- Monarchs: Juan Carlos I Felipe VI
- Prime Minister: Mariano Rajoy
- Preceded by: Montserrat García Llovera
- Succeeded by: Enric Millo

Member of the Parliament of Catalonia for the Province of Barcelona
- In office 16 December 2010 – 3 January 2012

Personal details
- Born: María de los Llanos de Luna Tobarra; 3 March 1960 (age 66) Sevilla, Spain
- Party: People's Party of Catalonia (PP)
- Education: University of Murcia
- Occupation: Civil servant, lawyer and politician

María de los Llanos de Luna Tobarra (born 3 March 1960), is a Spanish politician and lawyer, who has been Delegate of the Spanish Government in Catalonia between 2011 and 2016.

== Biography ==
Born in Sevilla on 3 March 1960, Llanos de Luna received a degree in Law from the University of Murcia, with a postgraduate degree in the School of Legal Practice of the same institution and a master's degree in Public Administration for INAP.

She held various positions as public speaker (1987-1993) and deputy director (1996-2003) of the National Institute of Social Security of Barcelona, president of the Commission for the Assessment of Labor Disabilities in Barcelona, and adviser of the General Treasury of the Social Security of Barcelona.

To the political plan, she was subdelegated from the Spanish Government in Barcelona (2003-2004), a Member of the Parliament of Catalonia, where she always used Spanish in his interventions, and the attached spokeswoman for the PPC parliamentary group since 2010; member of the Executive Committee and the Board of Directors of the Partido Popular de Catalunya; President of the Commission for Labor and Social Security Studies of the PPC, and Deputy Secretary of the Sector of the Popular Party of Barcelona.

In the November 2019 Spanish general election, Llanos de Luna was elected PP member of the Congress of Deputies for Province of Barcelona.

== Delegate of the Government to Catalonia ==
With the victory of Rajoy in the 2011 elections, she was appointed Delegate of the Government in Catalonia until 2016, when was succeeded by Enric Millo. During her mandate she had to face with the first independentist political actions, beginning by denouncing the municipalities that declare "free territories". On 27 March 2013 was declared persona non grata by Girona City Hall.
