= Micaela Navarro =

Spanish politician (born 1956)

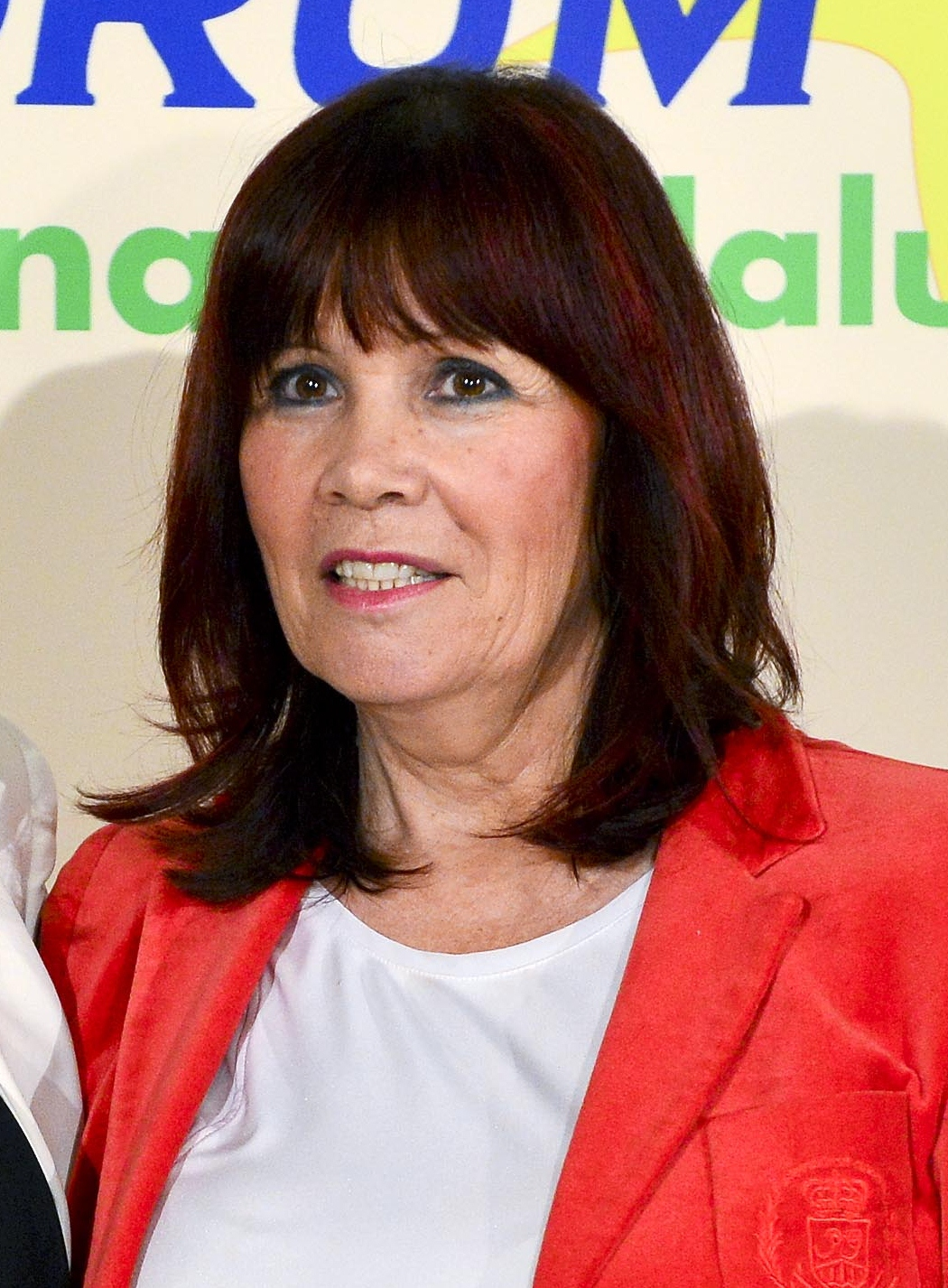
- Navarro in 2014

Second Vice President of the Congress of Deputies
- In office 13 January 2016 – 21 May 2019
- Preceded by: Javier Barrero
- Succeeded by: Alfonso Rodríguez Gómez de Celis

President of the Spanish Socialist Workers' Party
- In office 27 July 2014 – 28 September 2016
- Preceded by: José Antonio Griñán
- Succeeded by: Cristina Narbona

Personal details
- Born: Micaela Navarro Garzón; 2 September 1956 (age 70) Andújar, Andalusia, Spain
- Party: Spanish Socialist Workers' Party
- Occupation: Politician

Micaela Navarro (born 2 September 1956) is a Spanish politician who was President of the Spanish Socialist Workers' Party since 2014 until 2016. She previously served in both the Senate and the Congress of Deputies of Spain representing Jaén. She also was Counselor of Equality and Welfare of the Junta of Andalucía from 2004 to 2012.

== Early life and education ==
Navarro was born in Andújar where she attended school which was 12 kilometres (7.5 mi) away from home. After leaving it at the age of 12 and working in the fields for 13 years, she pursued her enrollment into a Graduado social where, following passing of the entrance exams she got in. She attended the University of Granada and the University of Jaén respectively.

== Career ==
Navarro started her career as childcare provider.

She joined politics in the '80s in her hometown Andújar where she was a women's movement leader. Following a successful movement for women's rights in Spain, she became a Councilor for Women and Social Affairs on which she served between 1991 and 1995. She joined a political race, representing Spanish Socialist Workers' Party of Andalusia for a post in the Congress of Deputies in 1996. As the result of the election, Navarro presided over Justice Commission and also was a Joint Congress-Senate Commission on Women's Rights' spokeswoman until 2000. During those years, she was appointed as a Senator of Andalusia and served as a Deputy of its Parliament.

From 1997 to 2000 she served as a Secretary for Women's Participation and from 2000 to 2004 has been a Secretary for Equality. As of September 2009, Navarro is Spanish Socialist Workers' Party's Provincial Executive in Jaén.

Between 2004 and 2012, she served as a counselor for Equality and Social Welfare under the presidencies of Manuel Chaves and José Antonio Griñán, who abandoned his post following the 2012 Andalusian regional elections.

On 19 July 2010, Navarro attended along with Baltasar Garzón and Bibiana Aído, the University of Jaén's summer courses initiatives regarding violence against women. During her speech she read the law on protection of women's rights when it comes to gender violence, calling it a ""complex" norm that not only addresses "the causes of violence, but also the consequences"". She also added that an Andalusian minister has a right to act "in the most effective way", "because that can mean saving a life".

In February 2012, when two congressmen were in dispute over who will control the party, Navarro decided to go against her party's demands and voted for Alfredo Pérez Rubalcaba over Carme Chacón. In March 2012, while serving as Minister of Equality and Social Welfare of Andalusia, she aligned herself with Gaspar Zarrías after he replaced José Antonio Griñán in a race for the Regional Government of Andalusia.

In September 2013, Navarro was appointed by Susana Díaz to serve as President of the Spanish Socialist Workers' Party of Andalusia. After serving as such for eight months, Navarro replaced Pedro Sánchez as President of the Spanish Socialist Workers' Party who at that time already occupied the post of secretary general.

On 1 May 2017, Navarro, as Vice President of the Congress of Deputies of the Kingdom of Spain, met with Eugene Czolij of the Ukrainian World Congress.

During the 2019 Congress of Deputies race, Navarro participated in a political debate against Pablo Montesinos for the Senate post which was shown on Cadena SER. Navarro won the Senate with 976 votes (44.83%).
