= Javier Barrero =

Spanish politician (1949–2022)

Member of the Congress of Deputies
- In office 28 October 1982 – 13 January 2016
- Constituency: Huelva

Second Vice-President of the Congress of Deputies
- In office 13 December 2011 – 13 January 2016
- Preceded by: Ana Pastor
- Succeeded by: Micaela Navarro

Personal details
- Born: Jaime Javier Barrero López; 18 September 1949 Sotillo de la Adrada, Spain
- Died: 3 May 2022 (aged 72) Huelva, Spain
- Party: PSOE

Jaime Javier Barrero López (18 September 1949 – 3 May 2022) was a Spanish politician. A member of the Spanish Socialist Workers' Party, he served in the Congress of Deputies from 1982 to 2016. He died of cancer in Huelva on 3 May 2022, at the age of 72.
