= Fleur Pellerin =

French politician (born 1973)

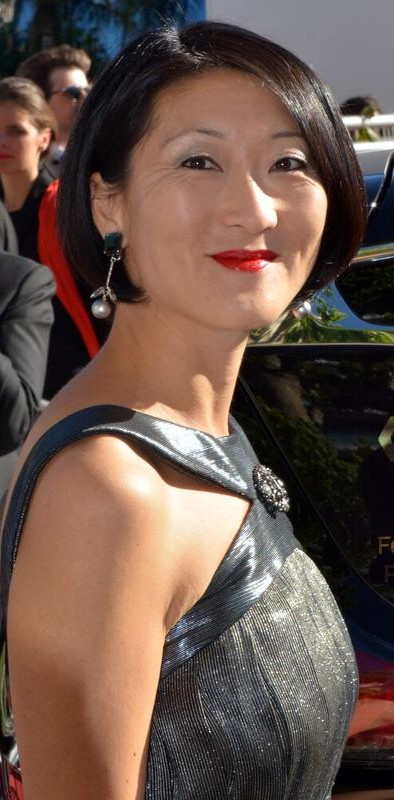
- Fleur Pellerin at the 2017 Cannes Film Festival

French Minister of Culture and Communications
- In office 26 August 2014 – 11 February 2016
- President: François Hollande
- Prime Minister: Manuel Valls
- Preceded by: Aurélie Filippetti
- Succeeded by: Audrey Azoulay

Secretary of State for Foreign Trade, Tourism and French Nationals Abroad
- In office 9 April 2014 – 26 August 2014
- President: François Hollande
- Prime Minister: Manuel Valls
- Preceded by: Nicole Bricq (Foreign Trade); Sylvia Pinel (Tourism); Hélène Conway-Mouret (French overseas)
- Succeeded by: Thomas Thévenoud

Minister Delegate for Small and Medium-sized Enterprises, Innovation and the Digital Economy
- In office 16 May 2012 – 2 April 2014
- President: François Hollande
- Prime Minister: Manuel Valls
- Preceded by: Éric Besson
- Succeeded by: Axelle Lemaire

Personal details
- Born: Kim Jong-suk; 29 August 1973 (age 53) Seoul, South Korea
- Party: Socialist Party
- Education: ESSEC; Sciences Po, Paris; ENA, Strasbourg

Fleur Pellerin (French pronunciation: [flœʁ pɛl.ʁɛ̃]; née Kim Jong-suk, born 29 August 1973) is a French businesswoman, former civil servant and Socialist Party politician who served as a French government minister from 2012 to 2016.

== Early life ==
Pellerin was born in 1973 in Seoul, South Korea, where she was abandoned on the streets aged only three or four days old before being rescued by an orphanage; six months later she was adopted by a French family. According to her adoption records, she was called Kim Jong-suk (김종숙; 金鍾淑), although it is unclear how she came by that name. Raised by middle-class parents, her father is a small-business owner, and she grew up in two Paris suburbs, Montreuil and Versailles.

== Early career ==
Pellerin graduated from ESSEC business school (Master's degree in management) while she was just 21. She then graduated from Sciences Po (MPA) before attending the École nationale d'administration (ENA). She joined the French Court of Auditors where she rose to become a high-ranking civil servant. From 2010 to 2012, Pellerin served as president of the 21st Century Club, a French group that promotes diversity in employment.

== Political career ==
Pellerin took charge of society and digital economy issues for Socialist Party candidate François Hollande in his successful 2012 French presidential election campaign.

After Hollande's election, Pellerin was appointed as with responsibility for Small and Medium-sized Enterprises, Innovation and the Digital Economy. In July 2012, she publicly announced her opposition to the sale of massive surveillance technologies causing quite a stir in French political circles since France is one of the biggest sellers of such technology. In November 2013, she implemented the creation of the French Tech label.

On 11 February 2014, Pellerin was among the guests invited to the state dinner hosted by U.S. President Barack Obama in honor of Hollande at the White House.

=== Minister of Culture and Communications, 2014–2016 ===
In August 2014, Pellerin was appointed Minister of Culture as part of the first government of Prime Minister Manuel Valls. Shortly after Pellerin was appointed Minister of Culture, the French magazine L'Express reported that she vacationed at the Corsican villa owned by film producer Pascal Breton, raising ethics questions.

In March 2015, Pellerin nominated Serge Lasvignes to head the Centre Pompidou, in a surprise choice to replace Alain Seban. Under her leadership, the French Culture Ministry made a bid in September 2015 to purchase one of a highly coveted pair of Rembrandt portraits from Éric de Rothschild for the Louvre in Paris, offering €80 million.

As part of a major government reshuffle in early 2016, Pellerin was sacked and replaced by Audrey Azoulay, who at the time served as Hollande's cultural advisor.

== Business career ==
In August 2016, Pellerin resigned from the French Civil Service to begin a new career in the private sector. She then became the head of Korelya Capital, an investment fund aimed at emerging technologies which benefited from a 100-million euros funding by the South Korean Naver Corporation. She also holds several other positions, including the following:

- Börse Stuttgart, Member of the Advisory Board (since 2025)
- Stanhope Capital Group, Member of the Board of Directors (since 2021)
- Reworld Media, Independent Member of the Board of Directors (since 2019)
- KLM, Member of the Board of Directors (2018–2026)
- Schneider Electric, Member of the Board of Directors (since 2018)
- Talan, Member of the Board of Directors (since 2018)
- KissKissBankBank, Member of the Board of Directors (since 2016)
- Devialet, Member of the Board of Directors (since 2016)

In August 2018, Pellerin was listed by UK-based company Richtopia at number 2 in the list of 100 Most Influential French Entrepreneurs.

== Other activities ==
- Eurockéennes, Member of the Board of Directors (since 2018)
- Canneseries, President (since 2017)
- Louvre Endowment Fund, Member of the Board of Directors
- Institut Montaigne, Member of the Board of Directors

== Personal life ==
Pellerin is married to Laurent Olléon, also an ENA graduate, who works for the Council of State providing legal advice to the French government.

== See also ==
- Adoption in France
- Korean adoptee

Political offices
Preceded by Aurélie Filippetti	Minister for Culture; 2014–2016	Succeeded by Audrey Azoulay
