= Teresa Cunillera =

Spanish politician (born 1951)

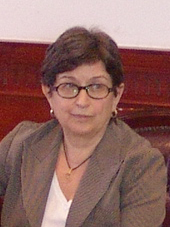

Delegate of the Government in Catalonia
- In office 22 June 2018 – 18 January 2022
- Monarch: Felipe VI
- Prime Minister: Pedro Sánchez
- Preceded by: Enric Millo
- Succeeded by: Maria Eugènia Gay

Third Secretary of the Congress of Deputies
- In office 13 December 2011 – 13 January 2016
- President: Jesús Posada

First Vice President of the Congress of Deputies
- In office 1 April 2008 – 13 December 2011
- President: José Bono Martínez

Member of the Congress of Deputies
- In office 3 March 1996 – 13 January 2016
- Constituency: Lleida
- In office 1982–1986
- Constituency: Lleida

Personal details
- Born: Teresa Cunillera i Mestres; February 17, 1951 (age 75) Bell-lloc d'Urgell, Spain
- Party: Socialists' Party of Catalonia (PSC)
- Occupation: Mercantile proficient and politician

Teresa Cunillera i Mestres (born 17 February 1951), is a Spanish politician She served as Delegate of the Government in Catalonia from 2018 to 2022. She was Vice President of the Congress of Deputies from 2008 to 2016.

== Biography and parliamentary career ==
She studied Mercantile Expertise and, after passing exams, she joined the State Administration in 1973. In 1975 she joined the Socialist Convergence of Catalonia to pass in 1978 to the Socialists' Party of Catalonia. She was elected MP for Lleida for the first time at age 31, in 1982. In 1986 she served in the Ministry of Relations with the Cortes, reaching the position of director of the Cabinet of Minister Virgilio Zapatero between 1989 and 1993.

She was reelected deputy in the general elections of 1996 and until 2015 she maintained her seat. In the IX Legislature she was the first vice president of the Congress.

Considered a person of confidence of Pedro Sánchez and Miquel Iceta, in 2014 she joined the team of confidence of Sanchez to coordinate his candidacy to the General Secretariat of the PSOE. In January 2017 she joined the Management Committee of the PSOE by of PSC.

== Delegate of the Spanish Government to Catalonia ==
In June 2018, she was appointed delegate of the Government in Catalonia, replacing Enric Millo, after Mariano Rajoy's Government was ousted following the approval of the motion of censure on 2 June 2018. She took office on 22 June.

She left the office in January 2022.
