= Pablo Montesinos =

Spanish politician (born 1985)

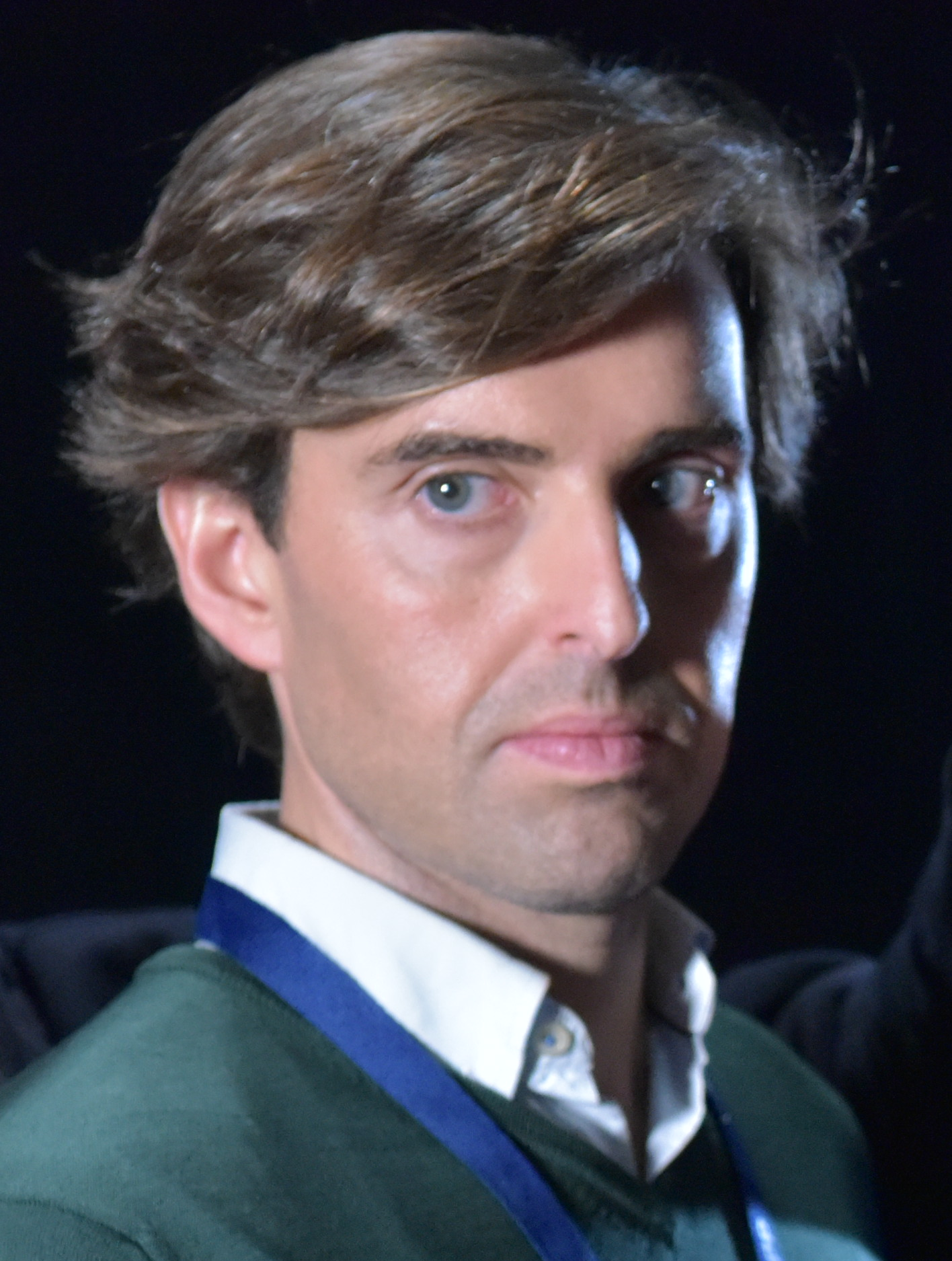
- Montesinos in 2018

Member of the Congress of Deputies
- In office 21 May 2019 – 21 April 2022
- Succeeded by: Ángel Luis González Muñoz
- Constituency: Málaga

Personal details
- Born: 6 September 1985 (age 40)
- Party: People's Party

Pablo Montesinos Aguayo (born 6 September 1985) is a Spanish politician. From 2019 to 2022, he was a member of the Congress of Deputies. From 2019 to 2022, he served as deputy secretary general for communication of the People's Party.
