= Serge Lasvignes =

French government official (1954–2025)

President of the Commission nationale de contrôle des techniques de renseignement
- In office 3 October 2021 – 1 February 2025
- Preceded by: Francis Delon
- Succeeded by: Solange Moracchini (interim)

President of the Centre Pompidou
- In office 4 March 2015 – 29 June 2021
- Preceded by: Alain Seban
- Succeeded by: Laurent Le Bon

Secrétaire général du Gouvernement
- In office 3 October 2006 – April 2015
- Preceded by: Jean-Marc Sauvé
- Succeeded by: Marc Guillaume

Personal details
- Born: 6 March 1954; Toulouse, France
- Died: 15 February 2025 (aged 70)
- Education: École nationale d'administration
- Occupation: Government official

Serge Lasvignes (6 March 1954 – 15 February 2025) was a French government official.

== Life and career ==
Born in Toulouse on 6 March 1954, Lasvignes studied letters at the École nationale d'administration. He became a Conseiller d'État in 2005 and became Secrétaire général du Gouvernement the following year, replacing Jean-Marc Sauvé. Under his leadership, the secretariat began monitoring the transposition of directives, implementing decrees of laws, and monitoring the reform of the decentralized French state.

On 4 March 2015, Lasvignes was appointed president of the Centre Pompidou. His appointment attracted criticism due to his previous positions and lack of experience in cultural affairs. On 1 April 2020, he was reappointed to the position. He retired from the post on 29 June 2021. On 3 October 2021, he was appointed president of the Commission nationale de contrôle des techniques de renseignement. He served in this role until 1 February 2025.

Lasvignes died on 15 February 2025, at the age of 70.

== Decorations ==
- Legion of Honour
  - Knight (1999)
  - Officer (2008)
  - Commander (2017)
- Grand Officer of the Ordre national du Mérite (2023)
- Officer (2016), Commander (2021) of the Ordre des Arts et des Lettres
- 3rd Class of the Order of the Rising Sun (2020)
