= Cubillos =

Coordinates: 41°34′31″N 5°44′22″W

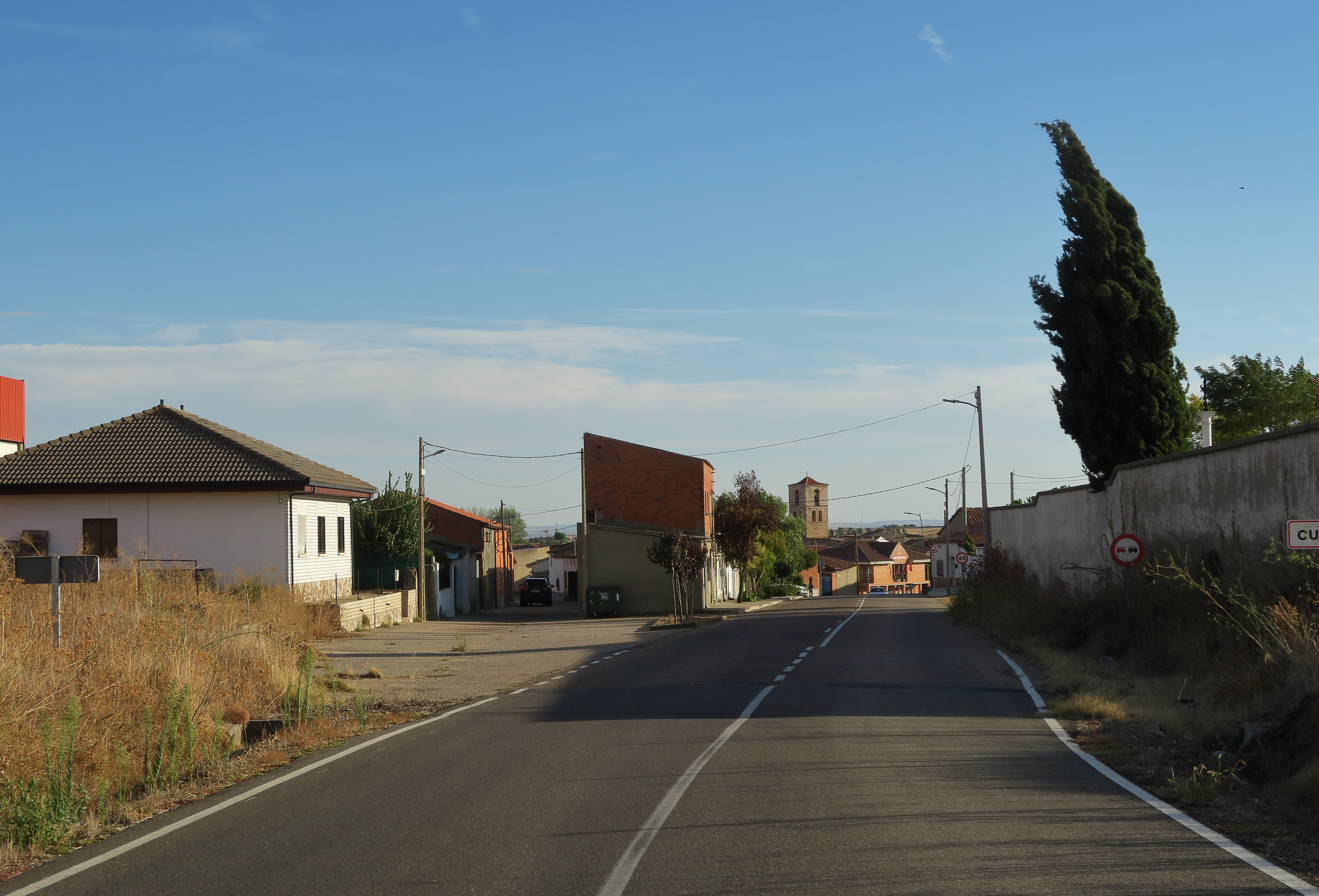

- Flag Coat of arms
- Interactive map of Cubillos
- Country: Spain
- Autonomous community: Castile and León
- Province: Zamora
- Municipality: Cubillos

Area
  - Total: 24 km^{2} (9.3 sq mi)

Population (2025-01-01)
  - Total: 294
  - Density: 12/km^{2} (32/sq mi)
- Time zone: UTC+1 (CET)
  - Summer (DST): UTC+2 (CEST)

Cubillos is a municipality located in the province of Zamora, Castile and León, Spain. According to the 2009 census (INE), the municipality has a population of 363 inhabitants.
