= José Bernal (politician) =

Spanish politician

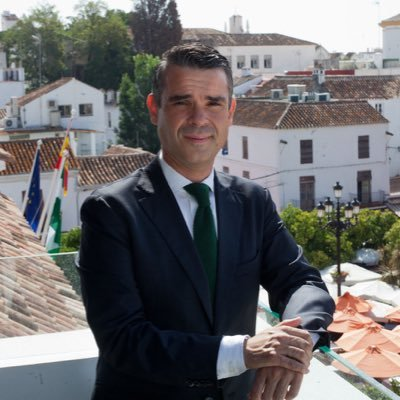

José Bernal Gutiérrez (born 3 November 1974) is a Spanish Socialist Workers' Party (PSOE) politician. He was elected to Marbella City Council in 2011 and was mayor from 2015 to 2017. He was a member of the Parliament of Andalusia from 2012 to 2016.

== Biography ==
In January 2011, Bernal was elected as the Spanish Socialist Workers' Party (PSOE) candidate for mayor of Marbella with 106 votes out of 121. His party lost 5,000 votes in the election in May, as Ángeles Muñoz of the People's Party (PP) retained her office.

Bernal was a member of the Parliament of Andalusia from 2012 to 2016. During his time in the legislature, he called for Marbella's council to be audited for what he believed to be financial mismanagement by Muñoz's government, who denied the accusations.

In the 2015 elections, Bernal was installed as the first PSOE mayor of Marbella since 1991, due to a four-party pact with United Left/The Greens–Assembly for Andalusia, Podemos and Opción Sampedreña (OSP), a localist group for San Pedro Alcántara. In August 2017, the two councillors from OSP supported a motion of no confidence in him, restoring Muñoz as mayor.

Bernal ran unopposed to be the PSOE candidate for mayor of Marbella in 2019. His party rose from eight to ten members of the 27-person council, but the PP under Muñoz won an absolute majority. He was elected to the Provincial Deputation of Málaga and ran for president of the body, which was won by the incumbent Francisco Salado of the PP with support from Citizens.

Bernal expressed his disappointment as the PSOE fell back to eight seats in the 2023 local election. He held the position of secretary general of the party in the city from 2008 to January 2022, and regained it in April 2025.
