= Málaga (Senate constituency) =

Senate of Spain constituency

Coordinates: 36°43′N 4°25′W

- Senate of Spain; Electoral constituency
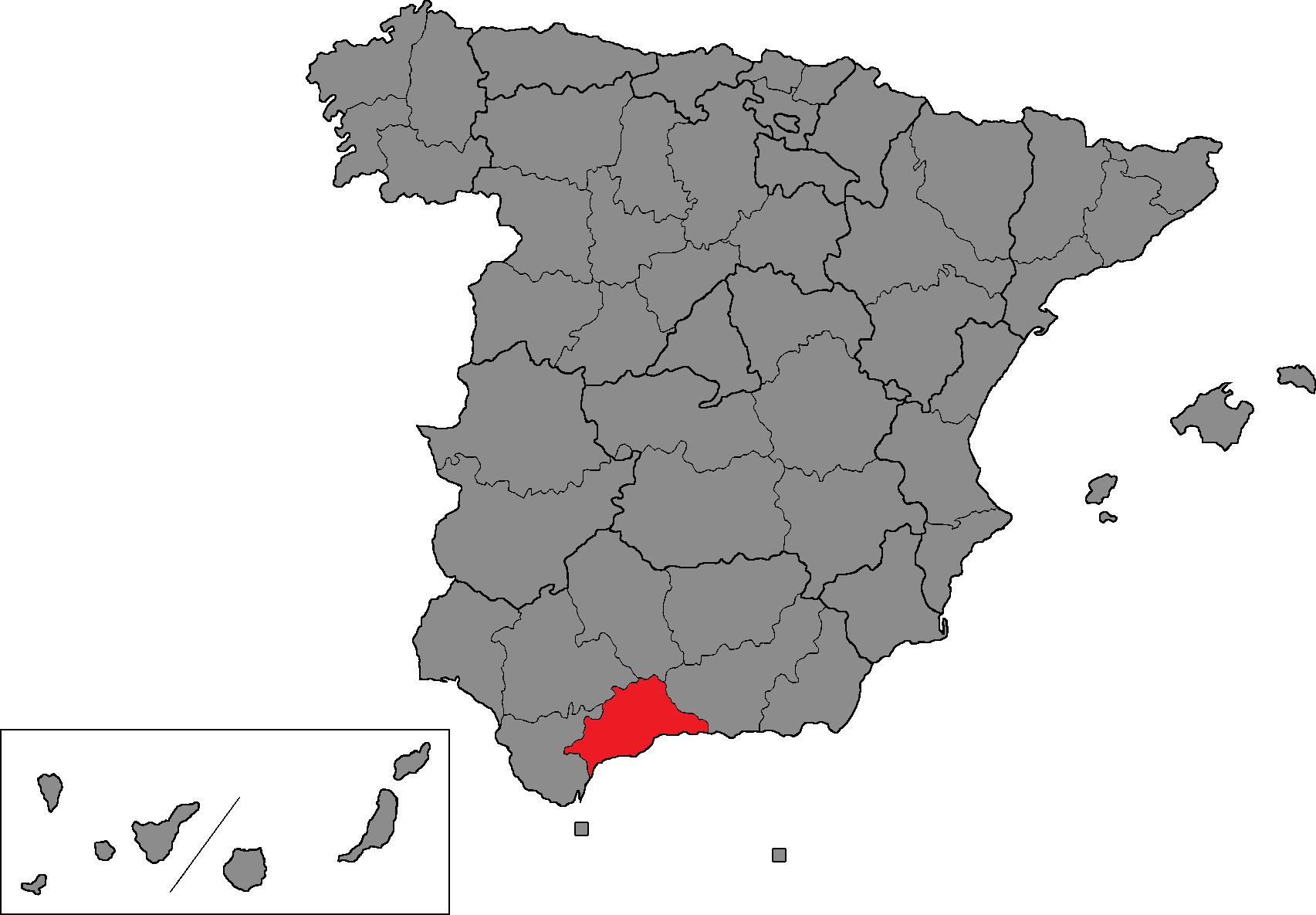
- Location of Málaga within Spain
- Province: Málaga
- Autonomous community: Andalusia
- Population: ▲1,773,136 (2024)
- Electorate: ▲1,239,846 (2023)
- Major settlements: Málaga, Marbella, Vélez-Málaga, Mijas, Fuengirola, Torremolinos, Benalmádena, Estepona

Current constituency
- Created: 1977
- Seats: 4
- Members: PP (3); PSOE (1)

Málaga is one of the 60 constituencies represented in the Senate of Spain, the upper chamber of the Spanish parliament, the Cortes Generales. The constituency (whose boundaries correspond to those of the homonymous province) elects four senators. The electoral system uses open-list (Note: Parties can group candidates into lists, although each candidate is treated separately for the purpose of the voting procedure.) partial block voting, with electors voting for individual candidates instead of parties. Electors can vote for up to three candidates.

== Electoral system ==
The constituency was created as per the Political Reform Law and was first contested in the 1977 general election. The Law provided for the provinces of Spain to be established as multi-member districts in the Senate, with this regulation being maintained under the Spanish Constitution of 1978. Additionally, the Constitution requires for any modification of the provincial limits to be approved under an organic law, needing an absolute majority in the Cortes Generales.

Voting is based on universal suffrage, comprising all Spanish nationals over 18 years of age with full political rights, provided that they have not been deprived of the right to vote by a final sentence. The only exception was in 1977, when this was limited to nationals over 21 years of age and in full enjoyment of their political and civil rights. Amendments in 2011 required non-resident citizens to apply for voting, a system known as "begged" voting (Spanish: Voto rogado). which was abolished in 2022. Further, amendments in 2018 granted the right to vote to those legally incapacitated. 209 Senate seats (207 in 1977, 208 from 1978 to 2026) are elected using open-list partial block voting: voters in constituencies electing four seats can choose up to three candidates; in those with two or three seats, up to two; and in single-member districts, one. Each of the 47 peninsular provinces is allocated four seats, while in insular provinces—such as the Balearic and Canary Islands—the districts are the islands themselves, with the larger ones (Mallorca, Gran Canaria and Tenerife) being allocated three seats each, and the smaller ones (Menorca, Ibiza, Formentera, Fuerteventura, La Gomera, El Hierro, Lanzarote and La Palma) one each. (Note: La Gomera and El Hierro comprised a single constituency for the 1977 election. A constitutional reform in 2026 awarded Formentera an independent senator separate from Ibiza.) Ceuta and Melilla elect two seats each. Until 1985, the law also provided for by-elections to fill Senate seats vacated up to two years into the legislature; subsequently, any vacancies arising after the proclamation of candidates and during the legislative term are filled by the next candidates on the party lists or, when required, by designated substitutes.

The electoral law allows for parties and federations registered in the interior ministry, alliances and groupings of electors to present lists of candidates. Parties and federations intending to form an alliance are required to inform the relevant electoral commission within 10 days of the election call—15 before 1985—whereas groupings of electors need to secure the signature of at least one percent of the electorate in the constituencies for which they seek election—one permille of the electorate, with a compulsory minimum of 500 signatures, until 1985—disallowing electors from signing for more than one list. Also since 2011, parties, federations or alliances that have not obtained a mandate in either chamber of the Cortes at the preceding election are required to secure the signature of at least 0.1 percent of electors in the aforementioned constituencies. Amendments in 2007 required a balanced composition of men and women in the electoral lists, so that candidates of either sex made up at least 40 percent of the total composition; further amendments in 2024 required the use of a zipper system.

== Senators ==
Senators for Málaga 1977–
Key to parties SD PSOE UCD PP CP AP
Legislature	Election	Distribution
Constituent	1977	3 / 1
1st	1979	3 / 1
2nd	1982	3 / 1
3rd	1986	3 / 1
4th	1989	3 / 1
5th	1993	3 / 1
6th	1996	3 / 1
7th	2000	1 / 3
8th	2004	3 / 1
9th	2008	3 / 1
10th	2011	1 / 3
11th	2015	1 / 3
12th	2016	1 / 3
13th	2019 (Apr)	3 / 1
14th	2019 (Nov)	3 / 1
15th	2023	1 / 3

== General elections ==
=== 2023 ===
Summary of the 23 July 2023 Senate of Spain election results
Candidates	Parties and coalitions	Popular vote	
Candidates	Parties and coalitions	Votes	%
José Alberto Armijo Navas	PP	300,592	39.50
Ángel Luis González Muñoz	PP	287,977	37.84
Lucía Yeves Leal	PP	284,278	37.36
Rafael Granados Ruiz	PSOE	235,312	30.92
• María Dolores Narváez Bandera	PSOE	230,786	30.33
• Salvador Javier Rojas Merino	PSOE	215,656	28.34
• Juan Jesús Ruiz Ballesteros	Vox	110,154	14.47
• Gemma María Palomo Ferrer	Vox	101,031	13.27
• Patricia García Leiva	Sumar	96,557	12.68
• Alejandro Reyes Rabell	Vox	95,534	12.55
• Ángel Rodríguez Ramírez	Sumar	77,198	10.14
• Noemí Vinuesa Calleja	Sumar	75,303	9.89
• Carmen Inmaculada Sánchez Carmona	PACMA	15,065	1.97
• Eva Ramos Taillefer	PACMA	8,951	1.17
• Federico José Cuesta Torres	PACMA	8,939	1.17
• María Carmen Mestanza Garrido	PUM+J	4,649	0.61
• Francisco José Rodríguez Marín	Recortes Cero	2,888	0.37
• Alfonso González Extremera	CJ	1,959	0.25
Blank ballots		13,744	1.80
Total		2,166,573	
Valid votes		760,900	96.94
Invalid votes		23,995	3.05
Votes cast / turnout		784,895	67.10
Abstentions		384,788	32.89
Registered voters		1,169,683	

=== November 2019 ===
Summary of the 10 November 2019 Senate of Spain election results in Málaga
Candidates	Parties and coalitions	Popular vote	
Candidates	Parties and coalitions	Votes	%
Miguel Ángel Heredia Díaz	PSOE	227,084	30.71
Estefanía Martín Palop	PSOE	220,436	29.81
María Ángeles Muñoz Uriol	PP	218,244	29.52
José Aurelio Aguilar Román	PSOE	209,692	28.36
• Joaquín Luis Ramírez Rodríguez	PP	199,203	26.94
• María Nieves Atencia Fernández	PP	167,498	22.65
• Pablo Fernando Sáenz de Tejada Ariza	Vox	146,233	19.78
• Aydé Salomón Ganado	Podemos–IULV–CA	92,807	12.55
• Ernesto Alba Aragón	Podemos–IULV–CA	84,129	11.38
• Juan Antonio Vargas Ramírez	Cs	78,268	10.59
• Salvador Pérez Mata	Podemos–IULV–CA	77,058	10.42
• María Pilar Conejo Ruiz	Cs	67,232	9.09
• Sergio Gómez Gutiérrez	Cs	55,749	7.54
• Cristina García Salazar	PACMA	21,220	2.87
• Francisco Soler Luque	Más País–Andalucía	19,103	2.58
• Vicente Manuel Corrales Rosado	PACMA	13,098	1.77
• Marta Marín Arrabal	PACMA	12,502	1.69
• Juan José Segura Palacios	AxSí	3,885	0.53
• María Dolores García Sánchez	PUM+J	3,099	0.42
• María Gloria Fernández Ruiz	PCPA	2,863	0.39
• Lourdes Fernández Navas	AxSí	2,813	0.38
• Francisco José Rodríguez Marín	Recortes Cero–GV	2,709	0.37
• Isabel Fernández Morales	Recortes Cero–GV	2,036	0.28
• Salvador González Agüera	AxSí	1,730	0.23
• Rafael Núñez Ruiz	Recortes Cero–GV	1,468	0.20
Blank ballots		15,629	2.11
Total		739,346	
Valid votes		739,346	96.85
Invalid votes		24,019	3.15
Votes cast / turnout		763,365	63.74
Abstentions		434,323	36.26
Registered voters		1,197,688	

== Bibliography ==
- Ley 1/1977, de 4 de enero, para la Reforma Política (Fundamental Law 1/1977). Official State Gazette (in Spanish). 4 January 1977. BOE-A-1977-165.
- Real Decreto-ley 20/1977, de 18 de marzo, sobre Normas Electorales (Royal Decree-Law 20/1977). Official State Gazette (in Spanish). 18 March 1977. BOE-A-1977-7445.
- Constitución Española (Constitution). Official State Gazette (in Spanish). 27 December 1978. BOE-A-1978-31229.
- Ley Orgánica 5/1985, de 19 de junio, del Régimen Electoral General (Organic Law 5/1985). Official State Gazette (in Spanish). 19 June 1985. BOE-A-1985-11672.
- Carreras de Odriozola, Albert; Tafunell Sambola, Xavier (2005) [1989]. Estadísticas históricas de España, siglos XIX-XX (PDF) (in Spanish). Vol. 1 (II ed.). Bilbao: Fundación BBVA. pp. 1072–1097. ISBN 84-96515-00-1. Archived from the original (PDF) on 24 September 2015.
