= Grotjahn =

Grotjahn is a surname. Notable people with the surname include:

- Alfred Grotjahn (1869–1931), German physician, social hygienist, eugenicist, journalist-author and politician
- Mark Grotjahn (born 1968), American painter
- Martin Grotjahn (1904–1990), German-born American psychoanalyst
