= Thea Westreich Wagner =

American art patron and collector

Thea Westreich Wagner (born 1942) is a New York–based American art patron and collector. In 2015, Thea Westreich Wagner and her husband Ethan Wagner donated their extensive collection of modern and contemporary art to the Whitney Museum of American Art in New York and the Centre Pompidou in Paris.

== Life ==
=== Washington, D.C. ===
Thea Westreich Wagner lived in the Washington, D.C., metropolitan area from 1964 to 1987. Influenced by the art museums and galleries of the city including the Freer Gallery, the National Gallery of Art, the Smithsonian Museum for American Art, and the Phillips Collection; Wagner audited classes in art history. Additionally, Wagner found early inspiration and influence in D.C. art dealer Ramon Osuna, who personally introduced Wagner to artists, an experience Wagner found "stimulating."

Wagner worked as a docent at the National Museum of American Art, further immersing herself in the D.C. art world. During this time, she also got to know Walter Hopps, the director of the Washington D.C.–based Corcoran Gallery of Art. Hopps encouraged Wagner to look at art with an open mind.

Wagner received additional first hand art exposure when she and her first husband commissioned Alice Neel to paint a family portrait of their family and Philip Pearlstein to paint a portrait of her and her husband. The portrait sittings required spending time in each artists’ studios. Wagner found the firsthand experience in the studios inspiring. She especially enjoyed getting to see how the artists went about their practices. In the early 70s, alongside the founding of the John F. Kennedy Center for the Performing Arts, Wagner was very involved in the performing arts, actively working with the American Ballet Theatre and the Kennedy Center. She befriended many performers, choreographers, and set designers; finding the experience of being at rehearsal "much like being in an artist's studio."

In the 1970s, Wagner worked for Bloomingdale's, heading up the public relations department for a newly opened store in Tysons Corner. The marketing director also shared an interest in emerging New York art; therefore, the two spent a good deal of time going to New York galleries. During this time Wagner befriended Paula Cooper, Ivan Karp, Ileana Sonnabend, Antonio Homem, and Leo Castelli.

After working at Bloomingdale's, Wagner, with the assistance of Livingston Biddle the then head of the NEA, was hired to work assisting emerging visual and performing artists qualify for NEA grants.

Thea Westreich Art Advisory Services opened in 1987.

=== New York City ===
In 1987, Wagner moved to New York and opened an advisory office in SoHo. At the time, there weren't many art advisory businesses. Originally geared towards the performing arts, Wagner shifted her focus toward fine art when clients started asking her to assist in building their collections.

== Art collection ==
Thea Westreich met Ethan Wagner in the early 1990s. Over three decades, they amassed an 800+ work art collection.

=== The Thea Westreich and Ethan Wagner Collection ===
In 2013, Thea and Ethan decided to donate their extensive collection of modern and contemporary art to the Whitney Museum of American Art in New York and the Centre Pompidou in Paris. In 2015, the Whitney Museum opened a show "Collected by Thea Westreich Wagner and Ethan Wagner" featuring the newly donated collection. After its run in New York, the show travelled to the Pompidou. In response to their donation, the Wagners were awarded the insignia of Officer of the Legion of Honor in 2018. Founded by Napoleon Bonaparte, the Legion of Honor is France’s highest award.

==== Artists in the Thea Westreich and Ethan Wagner Collection ====
Charline von Heyl, Anne Collier, Liz Deschenes, Hito Steyerl, Marc-Camille Chaimowicz, Robert Gober, Bernadette Corporation, Jeff Koons, Sam Lewitt, Sol LeWitt, Cady Noland, Richard Prince, Rirkrit Tiravanija, David Wojnarowicz, Christopher Wool, Robert Adams, Diane Arbus, Lee Friedlander, Eileen Quinlan, and many others.
