= Sara VanDerBeek =

American photographer (born 1976)

- Born: 1976; Baltimore, Maryland, U.S.
- Education: Cooper Union
- Known for: Photography
- Website: https://saravanderbeekstudio.com

Sara VanDerBeek (born 1976), is an American artist who lives and works in New York City. She is known for photographing sculptures and three-dimensional still-life assemblages of her own making, some of which she destroys after the photos have been taken, as well as for exploring the depiction of women in art history particularly classical or ancient sculpture.

== Early life and education ==
VanDerBeek grew up in Baltimore and studied visual arts at Baltimore School for the Arts during her high school years. Her father, Stan VanDerBeek, was an experimental filmmaker. She moved to New York in 1994 to attend her father's alma mater, Cooper Union. After graduating, she worked in commercial photography in London for three years. She returned to New York in 2001 and in 2003 she opened Guild & Greyshkul, an art gallery, in Soho with her brother, Johannes VanDerBeek, a sculptor, and artist Anya Kielar, another Cooper graduate. The gallery closed in 2009.

== Work ==
VanDerBeek is considered one of several contemporary photographers — among them Michele Abeles, Liz Deschenes and Eileen Quinlan — who are extending the innovations of the earlier Pictures Generation into new territory. Her work focuses on photographs of assemblages that she creates in her studio. Her work was included in "New Photography 2009" at the Museum of Modern Art in New York City. Curator Eva Respini, who put together the MoMA show, described VanDerBeek's art as having a hybrid nature: "Although Sara is a photographer, I like to think of her practice as multidisciplinary... [She is] very interested in the space of sculpture, the space of theater."

Her first solo museum show, "To Think of Time" at the Whitney in 2010, contained photographs of still lifes with objects including funerary masks and architectural details. VanDerBeek also uses imagery of classical figures in her work. She told Aperture's Brian Sholis in 2013, "I have always been interested in how photography affects the reading of scale, time, and place. It can be disorienting or confusing to encounter a photograph of something, but it can also usefully enlighten some little-perceived aspect of real-life experience." Since 2010, VanDerBeek's work has been shown in numerous solo exhibitions in galleries and museums throughout the U.S. and internationally.

== Collections ==
VanDerBeek's work is in the permanent collections:

- Solomon R. Guggenheim Museum
- Whitney Museum of American Art
- Museum of Contemporary Art, Los Angeles
- Brooklyn Museum
- Cornell Fine Arts Museum
