= Liz Kotz =

American art critic and writer

Liz Kotz (born about 1961) is an American writer, art critic, curator and art historian based in Los Angeles.

== Early life and education ==
In 2000, Kotz completed her Ph.D. in comparative literature at Columbia University, working with Benjamin Buchlolh. Her dissertation was titled, Language Models in 1960s American Art: From Cage to Warhol.

== Critical reception ==
Jacqueline Baas commented on "the richness of information and interpretation contained in so much of Words to Be Looked At". Baas writes, "The book is organized into three sections, each focusing on a different disciplinary aspect of the relationship between language and art. The first two chapters deal with works related to music, the next two with poetry, and the last two with visual art."

Reviewing The New Fuck You, Ellen Krout-Hasegowa wrote it is "a collection of fiction and poetry by nearly 40 writers, and it thrills with all the excitement of a sticky-floored camy ride."

== Selected publications ==
- Kotz, Liz (2007). Words to be looked at: language in 1960s art. Cambridge, Massachusetts: MIT Press. ISBN 9780262113083. OCLC 74353760.
- Kotz, Liz (September 11, 2012). "Video Projection: The Space between Screens". In Kocur, Zoya; Leung, Simon (eds.). Theory in contemporary art since 1985. John Wiley & Sons, Inc. (published 2012). ISBN 978-1-4443-3857-7. OCLC 798132382.
- Kotz, Liz (1994). "How to provide an artistic service: an introduction". In Kocur, Zoya; Leung, Simon (eds.). Theory in contemporary art since 1985. John Wiley & Sons, Inc. (published 2012). ISBN 978-1-4443-3857-7. OCLC 798132382.
- Marshall, Richard; Kotz, Liz (2006). Jack Pierson: desire despair. New York: Rizzoli International. ISBN 9780847828968. OCLC 76177564.
- Weaver, Suzanne; Hainley, Bruce; Kotz, Liz; Reynolds, Simon; Dallas Museum of Art (2008). Phil Collins: the world won't listen. Dallas; New Haven: Dallas Museum of Art; Yale University Press. ISBN 9780300132922. OCLC 156975317.
- Kozloff, Max; Apter, Emily; Butler, Cornelia H; Coleman, A. D; Kotz, Liz (2000). The social scene: the Ralph M. Parsons Foundation photography collection at the Museum of Contemporary Art, Los Angeles. Ralph M. Parsons Foundation. ISBN 9780914357742. OCLC 43095739.
- Lista, Marcella; Kotz, Liz; Rosenberg, Susan; Rondeau, Corinne; Bouniort, Jeanne; Penwarden, Charles; Carré d'art/Musée d'art contemporain de Nîmes; Hatje Cantz Verlag; Offsetdruckerei Karl Grammlich (2017). A different way to move: minimalismes, New York, 1960–1980. Hatje Cantz Verlag. ISBN 9783775742917. OCLC 985640271.
- Myles, Eileen; Kotz, Liz (1995). The new fuck you: adventures in Lesbian reading. MIT Press. ISBN 9781570270574. OCLC 33501128.

== See also ==
- Art criticism
