= Eileen Quinlan =

American photographer

Eileen Quinlan (born 1972 in Boston, Massachusetts) is a self-described still-life photographer who shoots with medium format and large format cameras. An art critic for Art in America likened her style to that of Moholy-Nagy and James Welling.

== Early life and education ==
Quinlan received her Bachelor of Fine Arts in 1996 from the School of The Museum of Fine Arts, Tufts University in Boston, Massachusetts. She received her Master of Fine Arts in 2005 from Columbia University.

Eileen did street photography, portrait photography, and landscape photography before getting into the photographic style she is in now. After graduating she learned that she no longer wanted to take pictures out in the world but wanted to construct photography in the studio. Still, she was unsure of what the subject would be. A lot of her early smoke studies she considered tests, but it did pave a path for her current style of photography.

== Work ==
Quinlan is often regarded as one of many contemporary artists revisiting late Modernism, alongside Tomma Abts, Mark Grotjahn, Wade Guyton, Sergei Jensen, and her husband Cheyney Thompson. Also she is considered one of several contemporary photographers — among them Michele Abeles, Liz Deschenes and Sara VanDerBeek — who are extending the innovations of the earlier Pictures Generation into new territory.

Quinlan uses medium and large format analog cameras to create abstract photographs, and then agitates the film via steel wool or long chemical processing. Some of her photographic subjects are smoke, mirrors, mylar, colored lights, and other photographs. The result is photographic images that are reminiscent of color field painting and op art thus furthering the contemporary conversation between photography and painting. Her political leanings, boundary pushing processes and resulting images are part of why Quilan has gained notoriety in exhibitions such as ""What is a Photograph?"" curated by Carol Squiers in 2014 at the International Center for Photography in New York City, New York and ""Outside the Lines: Rites of Spring"" curated by Dean Daderko in 2014 at the Contemporary Art Museum in Houston, Texas.

Eileen Quinlan spoke at the Institute of Contemporary Art in Boston discussing her exhibit, Momentum 13: Eileen Quinlan. Most of the time she spends doing photography is in the studio arranging objects. Eileen Quinlan was experimenting with objects coming into the picture and adding gels for color. She was rather interested in the construction of the photograph from the ground up. This led to a lot of her photographs having an abstract quality to them while also being a representational image before the lens. The printing process is very straightforward. A lot of the prints she makes are traditional analog prints and are not manipulated during the printing process. They are also not manipulated digitally after the fact. The effects, the colors, and the quality of lighting are all manipulated in the studio. She physically makes the manipulation before taking the pictures and playing around with the space of the objects she is shooting. A lot of what is seen in the prints is actually what she sees while she is shooting and putting the pictures together. For example, she took a few mirrors propped up against one another and then uses a strobe light that has a red gel on the light. The shadows moving in her images is actually a shadow from her moving the lights around the space. When she shoots she spends a lot of time arranging objects, looking back at the lens to see how the composition is coming together. Once she finds an interesting composition she is content with and wants to continue working with it she locks down the camera to not move the setup. Then she plays around with the lighting. Looking through the lens is no longer important, but rather the lighting around the space. This allows her to get an idea of where the shadows are falling. In studio lighting there's a light to see where the arrangements are but the strobe light itself fires off lighting in a different manner really quickly, so she is somewhat aware of what she will get but not entirely. This allows her to work with dramatic shadows and get a sense of light.

== Notable exhibitions ==
=== Group exhibitions ===
- 2017, Viva Arte Viva, 57th Venice Biennale, Venice
- 2014, A Moveable Feast - Part XI, with Cheyney Thompson, Campoli Presti, Paris
- 2014, Technokinesis, Blum & Poe, New York & Los Angeles
- 2014, Rites of Spring, Contemporary Arts Museum Houston, Houston, TX
- 2014, What Is a Photograph?, Organized by Carol Squiers, International Center of Photography, New York
- 2014, L'épreuve de l'abstraction, FRAC Poitou-Charentes
- 2009, Slow Movement or: Half and Whole, Kunsthalle Bern, Switzerland
- 2008, TBA with Cheyney Thompson, Arnolfini, Bristol, UK.
- 2007 Strange Magic, Luhring Augustine Gallery, New York.
- 2007, Undone, Whitney Museum of American Art at Altria, New York.

=== Solo gallery presentations ===
- 2018, Solo exhibition, Miguel Abreu Gallery, New York
- 2016, Mind Craft, Miguel Abreu Gallery, New York
- 2015, Solo exhibition, Campoli Presti, London
- 2015, Solo exhibition, Campoli Presti, Paris
- 2013, Curtains, Miguel Abreu Gallery, New York
- 2012, Twin Peaks, Campoli Presti, London
- 2011, Constant Comment, Overduin and Kite, Los Angeles, CA
- 2010, Highlands, Sutton Lane (Campoli Presti), Paris
- 2010, Nature Morte, Miguel Abreu Gallery, New York
- 2009, Momentum 13 was Quinlan's first solo museum exhibition.
- 2008 at Art Statements, Art|39|Basel, Switzerland, Sutton Lane, Paris, Galerie Daniel Buchholz, Cologne, and Overduin and Kite, Los Angeles.
- 2006 at Sutton Lane (Campoli Presti), London, in 2007 at Miguel Abreu Gallery, New York.
