= Jacques Charpentier =

French composer and organist

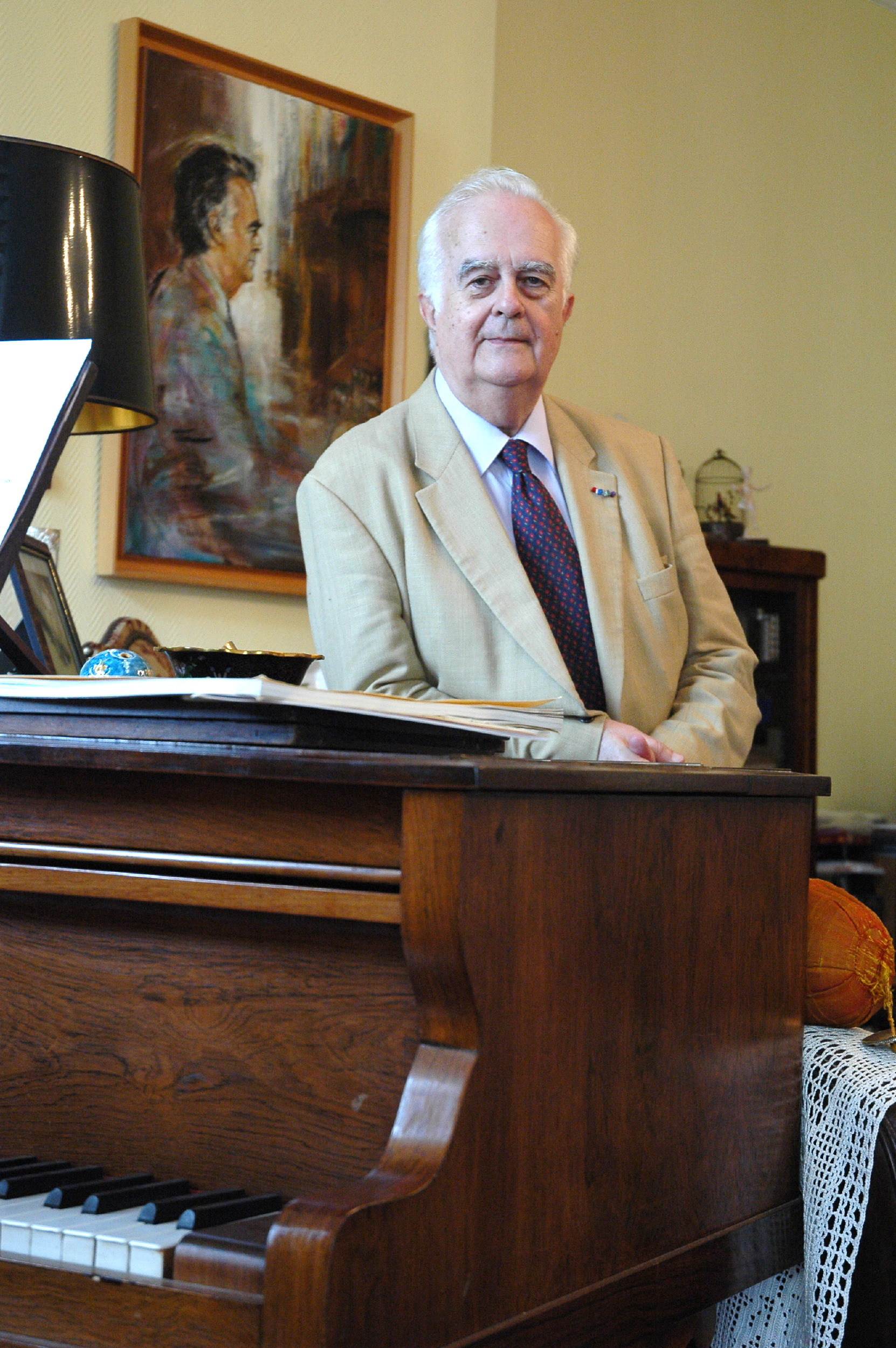
- Jacques Charpentier
- Born: 18 October 1933; Paris, France
- Died: 15 June 2017 (aged 83); Lézignan-Corbières, France
- Era: Contemporary

Jacques Georges Paul Charpentier (18 October 1933 – 15 June 2017) was a French composer and organist. He is unrelated to either of two other eminent French musicians with the same surname (Marc-Antoine Charpentier and Gustave Charpentier).

== Biography ==
Born in Paris, he taught himself to play the piano as a child. From 1950 to 1953 he worked with Jeanine Rueff, then left for India, acquainting himself with traditional Hindu music in Bombay and Calcutta. Charpentier stayed there for 18 months, a period that would prove decisive for his musical evolution. Upon returning to France in 1954, he studied composition with Tony Aubin and the philosophy of music with Olivier Messiaen at the Conservatoire de Paris. He joined the Jeunesses musicales de France in 1959, then was named principal inspector of music in 1966 and general inspector of music in 1975 at the Secrétariat d’État à la Culture. In 1974 the organ of Saint-Nicolas-du-Chardonnet in Paris was named after him. The same year as his appointment as general inspector, he founded a center for Gregorian studies and traditional music, and also began teaching courses in orchestration at the Conservatoire de Paris. In 1979 he succeeded Jean Maheu as Director of Music, Lyrical Art, and Dance at the Ministère de la Culture et de la Communication, serving in that position from 1979 to 1981. Charpentier then became director of music for the city of Nice. He lived for many years in Carcassonne.

Charpentier also authored pedagogical works on Gregorian chant and Indian classical music.

He died in Lézignan-Corbières on 15 June 2017, aged 83.

== Prizes ==
- Prix Koussevitsky (1966)
- Grand Prix musical de la Ville de Paris (1978)

== Awards ==
- Commander of the National Order of Merit (France) (2006)

== Musical influences ==
India decisively influenced Charpentier and his music. Upon his return from India, Charpentier sought to synthesize these new Eastern influences with his Western musical culture. Messiaen directed him to the writings of Saint Thomas Aquinas, which occupied him for two years. In 1957 he undertook a colossal work dedicated to the 72 Carnatic styles of India, the basic scales of traditional Indian music. This became 72 études karnatiques, finished in 1984, 27 years later, wherein the influence of Messiaen is demonstrated. In these pieces the piano is treated as a percussion instrument, with the staggering of resonances and sounds recalling the instruments of India. Charpentier also often wrote in the neo-classical style, shown in such works as Symphonie brève (1957), Sinfonia sacra pour le jour de Pâques (1965), and Prélude pour la Genèse (1967).

== Selected Compositions ==
=== 1950s ===
- 72 études karnatiques, for piano, in twelve books of six studies each, composed 1957-1984
- Symphonie brève (1958)

=== 1960s ===
- Sinfonia sacra pour le jour de Pâques (1965)
- Prélude pour la Genèse (1967)
- Gavambodi 2, for alto saxophone and piano (1969)

=== 1970s ===
- Béatrix de Plannisolas, opera in 5 acts in the Occitan language (1971), performed at the Aix-en-Provence Festival, 1971
- Le Livre d'orgue, commissioned by the Journées de musique contemporaine of Metz (1973)
- Symphonie no 5 (1977)
- Symphonie no 6, pour orgue et orchestre (1978)

== Bibliography ==
- Vignal, Marc (1988). Dictionnaire de la musique française. Larousse.
- Honegger, Marc (1986). Dictionnaire de la musique : les hommes et leurs œuvres. Bordas.
