= Raha Raissnia =

Raha Raissnia (born 1968, Tehran, Iran) is a contemporary artist based in New York City, known for her painting, drawing, filmmaking and performance art. Raissnia manipulates cinema's structural elements in loop installations and live performances. She often alters and tunes the mechanical parts of her film projectors, relying on her hand and playing them similarly to the way musicians play instruments.

Raissnia presented a solo exhibition in 2017–2018 at the Drawing Center in New York, and in 2016, her work was the subject of a solo presentation at the Museum of Modern Art, also in New York. Her work has also been featured in the 56th Venice Biennale, All the World's Futures, curated by Okwui Enwezor and has been included in group exhibitions at the Museum of Contemporary Art, Los Angeles and at The Kitchen in New York, among others.

== Early life and career ==
Raissnia grew up in Tehran during the Iranian Revolution of 1978–79. She cites her trips to the city center with her father, an amateur photographer, to document the protests against the Shah as a formative experience.

In 1983, Raissnia and her mother were exiled to France, eventually emigrating to Houston, Texas where her mother's brother was residing. Raha and her family benefited from the Shah and Western corporate influence and wealth, which is the reason why her and her mother got exiled into France, eventually moving to Houston where her mother's brother was residing.

She received a B.F.A. from the School of the Art Institute of Chicago in 1992, and a M.F.A. from Pratt Institute in 2002. From 1995 to 1999, Raissnia worked at the Anthology Film Archives. Her exposure to avant-garde filmmaking during this time has deeply influenced her practice. She held her first solo show there in 2002, followed by her first performance work, Systems in collaboration with Briggan Krauss at the Thomas Erben Gallery (New York) in 2004.

== Work ==
Raissnia's paintings, drawings, films, and performances are interdependent, drawing equally from "the gestural and photographic, the figurative and abstract." At key in her practice are qualities specific to still and moving imagery, which are often differentiated and combined. She renders "their boundaries ambiguous by manipulating and layering her source materials", and subsequently, her works have aspects of both but belong to neither. In describing her works, Raissnia has said: "My paintings brought abstraction to the vision I captured from the world on film and now the films are bringing elements of reality into my paintings." In addition, Raissnia uses drawing to investigate how films and paintings influence one another. Amber Harper at The Drawing Center has remarked that Raissnia's work "speaks to the possibility of drawing, above all, as a way to revisit, abstract, question, and change the images we use to construct identity." In this way, Raissnia's works continually generate levels of signification and interpretation that coexist.

Music and sound also play a crucial role in Raissnia's practice, both inspiring and forming completed works. In BOMB magazine, Jeanne Liotta has commented that Raissnia "made a painting and bombarded it with light and sound", resulting in a "wild ephemeral synaesthesia". In another instance, Milton Cruz has described Raissnia's drawings as "intricate rhythms and musical modulations". Raissnia has stated that her work "aspires to music and develops like a musical piece."

=== Major works ===
In 2006, Raissnia held Stele, her first solo show at Miguel Abreu Gallery. Her gestural paintings were described as "sanded to an absolute smoothness, a silky finish at odds with the angularity of content", while the drawings were detailed as being "so packed, so thick, their shiny skein becomes almost reflective..." In her second solo show at the gallery, Raissnia presented Free Way, a film installation consisting of collaged 16 and 35 mm filmstrips with hand-processed, hand-painted, and manipulated materials pressed between glass slides. Accompanied by Charles Curtis's minimalist soundtrack, Free Way included segments of still life photograph with paint and ink drawings reworked and scratched into acetate sheets, as well as sections from human x-rays. The filmmaking process is developed by breaking apart the cinematic movements of film into three components: three slides are projected side-by-side and partly overlap in the middle, while an 18 frame per second 16mm film is superimposed over the left image. This results in a slow-moving montage that is both temporary and aleatory. The New Yorker noted that "the ghosts of Moholy-Nagy, the Russian Constructivists, and Stan Brakhage haunt[ed]" the show.

Raissnia presented a film-performance installation Glean at Gallery Marta Cervera in 2010. The exhibition consisted of Glean, a footage shot with super 8mm film which was hand painted and transferred to 16mm film; a series of oil on canvas; and drawings on graphite. Reviewing the show for Revista Claves de Arte, Ana Folguera de la Cámara observed: "Technique, in this case, is clearly displaced so as not to be recognizable...This artist seems to move between expressionistic vehemence and the self-containment of abstraction." In 2013, at Miguel Abreu Gallery, Raissnia presented Series in Fugue, an exhibition with panels of oil and gesso, works on paper and films. The show marked a closer nexus being forged among her films, drawings, and paintings: each painting was a contrapuntal composition influenced by two visual quotations from the artist's film, which was transferred onto gessoed wood and guided the building up of oil paint, its sanding and reapplication. Likewise, her films were constructed from fragments of earlier work.

At the 56th Venice Biennale in 2015, Raissnia showed Longing (2014), a three-part 16mm black-and-white and color film developed from a series of visits to East Harlem, New York. For the work, Raissnia hid her camera in her pocket, using her whole body to aim the lens instead. Consequently, the whirling movements create abstractions throughout the footage. In addition to positive-negative reversals, known as solarization, the work is accompanied by a soundtrack by Panagiotis Mavridis, who composed it using rolls of celluloid film mounted on gear motors.

In 2017, Raissnia held her first solo museum exhibition, Alluvius, at the Drawing Center. The show displayed two series of densely-composed charcoal drawings, Alluvius (2016) and Canto (2017), specially made for the occasion. The drawings referenced images sourced from the artist's personal archives of both original and found photographs and films. The images ranged from photographic slides of mosques, iPhone films taken on walks, to photographs of friends, family, and strangers. They were then abstracted through a process of rephotographing, drawing, and transferring between paper and celluloid. The show was featured in Artforum as a critics' pick, with Zack Hatfield penning: "While a different artist might have used this backstory to evoke annihilative neglect concerning personal and national memory, Raissnia, through her process, suggests a more generative decay."

In a continuation from Alluvius, Raissnia presented Galvanization at Miguel Abreu Gallery in 2019. With Sultanate Architecture, a set of 35mm slides discarded by Brooklyn College, as the source material, the show interrogated "the camera's capacity to faithfully record subjects or to represent historical memory". The exhibition included a series of paintings and drawings alongside Alluvius, Aviary #3 (2018), Galvaniscope 1 (2018) and Galvaniscope 2 (Film A and Film B) (2018).

In the Galvanoscope series, departing from her manipulation of analog projectors in real time, Raissnia set the projector to run automatically in a three-minute loop. Consisting of two projectors, Galvanoscope 2 (Film A and Film B) placed them on opposite ends of the gallery with a rectangular box in the middle. Each projector cast a series of images onto the box, and as its surface was transparent, the two projections blended and produced a distinctive combination of the two films. Galvanoscope 1 used the same two series of images, but combined them beforehand and showed them from a single projector. The Brooklyn Rail remarked that the show "animates the viewer's relationship with Raissnia's found photographs, and evokes the embodied perceptual experience of moving through an architectural environment".

== Exhibitions (selections) ==
Solo exhibitions of Raissnia's works have been held at Miguel Abreu Gallery (New York, 2006, 2008, 2011, 2013, 2015, and 2019); Galeria Marta Cervera (Madrid, 2010, 2014, 2018); The Drawing Center (2017); Ab/Anbar Gallery (Tehran, 2015); Galerie Xippas (Paris, 2006 and 2009); Thomas Erben Gallery (New York, 2005 and 2004); Isfahan Museum of Contemporary Art (Isfahan, 2004); Court House Gallery at Anthology Film Archives (New York, 2002 and 2003); and Pratt Institute (Brooklyn, 2002). Raissnia's works have been included in the 2021 edition of Greater New York at MoMA PS1; the 13th Bienal de Cuenca; 56th International Art Exhibition, Venice Biennale; as well as group exhibitions at the Museum of Contemporary Art (Los Angeles); White Columns (New York); Access Gallery (Vancouver); the Museum of Contemporary Art St. Louis; Khastoo Gallery (Los Angeles), among others. Raissnia's debut solo exhibition in Asia opens at Empty Gallery (Hong Kong) in December 2022.

Raissnia's projection-performances, often in collaboration with Aki Onda and Panagiotis Mavridis, as well as John Zorn and Dalius Naujo, have been held at the Whitney Museum of American Art (New York), REDCAT (Los Angeles), Kunsthal Rotterdam, Arnolfini - Center for Contemporary Arts (Bristol, UK), the Drawing Center (New York), Issue Project Room (New York), Emily Harvey Foundation (New York), and International Film Festival Rotterdam, among others.

== Collections ==
Raissnia's works are held in the collections of the Museum of Modern Art (New York); Museum of Contemporary Art (Los Angeles); the Pejman Foundation (Tehran); Colección INELCOM (Madrid); the Pinault Collection; and The Museum of Old and New Art (Tasmania).

== Recognition ==
Raissnia has received grants and awards from the Pollock-Krasner Foundation (2014 and 2008); the Foundation for Contemporary Arts Grants to Artists Award (2011); the Pratt Institute Delacroix Award for Painting Excellence (2001); and Dodd's Travel Grant (1998).
