= Sam Lewitt =

American artist (born 1981)

Sam Lewitt (born 1981 in Los Angeles, California) is an American contemporary artist living and working in Berlin. Lewitt “has long engaged questions of reading and legibility, systems of graphic and readerly notation, and technologies of communication old and new.”

== Early life ==
Lewitt was born August 30, 1981, in Venice Beach, CA. He received a BFA from School of Visual Arts, NY and was a participant in the Whitney Independent Study Program (ISP) in 2004/5.

== Career ==
Lewitt is represented by the Miguel Abreu Gallery in New York City.

Art historian André Rottman writes: "Lewitt has developed a practice that deliberately collapses the physical aesthetic object into the placeless topologies of global production, exchange and distribution. Instead of simply occupying the supposedly stable perimeters of a given exhibition venue, Lewitt’s projects time and again signal and register, infiltrate and reroute the flow and movement of information and capital, of energy and heat that are operative, yet often concealed or hidden from view, in the standardized mechanisms, closed systems, and infrastructures supporting and shaping the sites of artistic work and public reception beyond the gallery or the museum."

=== Selected solo exhibitions ===
- CURE (the Work), Z33 House for Contemporary Art, Design & Architecture, BE (2020)
- DREAMBOAT DIRTBLOCK, Miguel Abreu Gallery, New York, US (2020)
- COVER, Miguel Abreu Gallery, New York, US (2018)
- CORE (the “Work”), Frieze/BMW Open Work commission, Frieze Art Fair, London, UK (2018)
- FILLER, Galerie Buchholz, Berlin, DE (2017)
- More Heat Than Light, Kunsthalle Basel, CH (2016)
- More Heat Than Light (Airbnb), New York, US (2016)
- Less Light Warm Words, Swiss Institute of Contemporary Art, New York, US (2016)
- More Heat Than Light, CCA Wattis Institute for Contemporary Arts, San Francisco, US (2015)
- Vebrannte Erde: Second Salvage, Leopold-Hoesch Museum, Düren, DE (2014)
- Casual Encounters, Miguel Abreu Gallery, New York, US (2013)
- International Corrosion Fatigue, Galerie Buchholz, Cologne, DE (2013)
- 0110_Universal-City_1010, Galerie Buchholz, Berlin, DE (2011)
- Total Immersion Environment, Miguel Abreu Gallery, New York, US (2011)
- From A to Z and Back, Galleria Franco Soffiantino, Turin, IT (2010)
- From A to Z and Back, Gallery Taka Ishii, Kyoto, JP (2009)
- I hereby promise… etc., Miguel Abreu Gallery, New York, US (2008)
- Printer, Scriptor: Folios, Galerie Daniel Buchholz, Köln, DE (2008)
- Patience...Fortitude, Miguel Abreu Gallery, New York, US (2007)

=== Selected group exhibitions ===
- The Poet Engineers, Miguel Abreu Gallery, NY, US (2021)
- St. Elmo’s Fire, Rodeo Gallery, Pireus, GR (2021)
- New Order: Art and Technology in the 21st Century, curated by Michelle Quo, MoMA, New York, US (2019)
- YOU: Works Chosen from the Foundation Lafayette Anticipations Collection, Musée d’Art Moderne de la Ville de Paris, Paris, FR (cat.) (2019)
- On Circulation, curated by Axel Wieder, Kunsthalle Bergen, NO (2018)
- Crash Test: the Molecular Turn, curated by Nicolas Bourriaud, La Panacée, MoCo, Montpelier, FR (cat.) (2018)
- Andere Mechanismen, curated by Anthony Huberman, Secession, Wien, AT (cat.) (2018)
- Venice Beinnale 2017: VIVA ARTE VIVA, curated by Christine Macel, Venice, IT (cat.) (2017)
- Sam Lewitt/Cheyney Thompson, curated by Karel Císar, The House of Arts, Brno, CZ (2017)
- A Slow Succession with Many Interruptions, San Francisco Museum of Modern Art, San Francisco, US (2016)
- Nature After Nature, curated by Susanne Pfeffer, Museum Fridericianum, Kassel, DE (cat.) (2014)
- and Materials and Money and Crisis, curated by Richard Birkett in dialog with Sam Lewitt, Museum für Moderner Kunst Ludwig Stiftung (MUMOK) Vienna, AT (cat.) (2013)
- Whitney Biennial: 2012, curated by Jay Sanders and Elisabeth Sussman, Whitney Museum of American Art, New York, US (cat.) (2012)
- Quodlibet III: Alphabets and Instruments, Galerie Daniel Buchholz, Berlin, DE (2011)
- Time Again: Novel, Sculpture Center, Long Island City, New York, US (2011)
- The Evryali Score, curated by Olivia Shao, Gallery David Zwirner, New York, US (2010)
- Greater New York: The Baghdad Batteries, curated by Olivia Shao, P.S.1 Contemporary Art Center, New York, US (cat.) (2010)
- Quod Libet II, Galerie Buchholz, Köln, DE (2009)
- Re-gift, curated by John Miller, Swiss Institute, New York, US (cat.) (2009)

In 2013, Richard Birkett invited Lewitt to co-curated And Materials and Money in Crisis at MUMOK (museum moderner kunst stiftung ludwig wien), Vienna, Austria, based on the themes of a symposium by the same name that Lewitt had organized at Artist Space the previous year. He was one of eleven artists whose work was displayed therein.

Lewitt received a Foundation for Contemporary Arts Grants to Artists award (2018) and that same year was appointed Teiger Mentor in the Fine Arts at Cornell University, Department of Art, Architecture and Planning. In 2014 Lewitt was selected for the NRW Kunststiftung “25/25/25” Committee Exhibition Award.

== Monographs and artist books ==
- Sam Lewitt CURE (the Work), (Sequence Press/Z33; New York/Hasselt) 2022
- Stranded Assets – Modulo 2: Protezione Ambientale, (One Star Press; Paris) 2017
- More Heat Than Light, (Walther König Verlag/Sequence Press/Galerie Buchholz; London/New York/Cologne) 2016
- TEMPLATE (Three Star Books; Paris) 2014
- Sam Lewitt: Fluid Employment (Walther König Verlag/Sequence Press/Galerie Buchholz; London/New York/Cologne) 2013

== Public Collections ==
- Aïshti Foundation, Beirut, LEBN (private collection open to public)
- Centre Georges Pompidou, Paris, FR
- Fondazione Memmo, Rome, IT (private collection open to public)
- Foundation Lafayette, Paris, FR (private collection open to public)
- Institute of Contemporary Art, Miami, FL, US
- Leopold Hoesch Museum, Düren, DE
- Museum Moderner Kunst Stiftung Ludwig Wien (MUMOK), Vienna, AT
- Museum of Modern Art, New York, NY, US
- Museum of Modern Art, San Francisco, CA, US
- Pinault Collection at the Palazzo Grassi (private collection open to public)
- Whitney Museum of American Art, New York, NY, US
