= Jean Widmer =

Swiss-French graphic designer (1929–2026)

- Born: Hans Ulrich Widmer; 31 March 1929; Frauenfeld, Thurgau, Switzerland
- Died: 2 February 2026 (aged 96); Paris, France
- Education: Zurich School of Arts and Crafts
- Occupation: Graphic designer

Jean Widmer (born Hans Ulrich Widmer; 31 March 1929 – 2 February 2026) was a Swiss and French graphic designer.

Widmer studied at the Zurich School of Arts and Crafts and moved to France in the 1950s, aiming to revamp public signage and road infrastructure. He was one of the first designers in France to make typography an element of their designs. He also created the design of the Centre Pompidou logo.

Widmer died on 2 February 2026, at the age of 96, in Paris.

== Distinctions ==
- Ordre des Arts et des Lettres (Chevalier, 1983; Officier, 1991; Commandeur, 2001)
- Knight of the Legion of Honour (2012)
- Swiss Design Award (2017)
