= Florian Pumhösl =

Austrian contemporary artist

Florian Pumhösl (born 1971) is a contemporary artist based in Vienna, mainly known for his works that employ abstract visual language to reflect on the diverse manifestations of modernity. His interests include "historical formal vocabulary of modernism", and "the genealogical derivation of a particular form" and its sociopolitical setting. His work has been described as being "between the two poles of formalism and historicity." Often taking the form of a series, his works span a wide range of media, including films, installations, objects, and glass paintings.

== Education ==
Florian Pumhösl was born in Vienna in 1971, where he lives and works. He studied at the Höhere Graphische Bundes-Lehr- und Versuchsanstalt in Vienna (1991) and the Hochschule für angewandte Kunst Wien (Diploma, 1997). His international career began at the age of twenty two, when he participated in Backstage: Topologie Zeitgenössischer Kunst at the Kunstverein Hamburg.

== Work ==
Florian Pumhösl's work constitutes a "constellation of historical references encoded within a visual language that appears purely formal." The apparent abstraction of his works stem from specific archival sources, establishing contact with realms traditionally consigned to the margins of modern art. The sources include 17th-century kimono designs, avant-garde typography, WWI military uniform patterns, cartography, Latin American textiles, and early dance notations. Through the selection, reduction, rearrangement, and reproduction of his source materials—unsystematic and subjective modes of transcription—Pumhösl reveals that the modernist fantasy of self-referentiality was always haunted by irreducible specificity and cultural instability. Calling Pümhosl's works "second-order abstraction," André Rottmann has noted that this aesthetic strategy "creates an inversion of not only geometrical but also gestural abstraction's claim to create instantaneously intelligible signs, in which immediacy and universality converge." In another instance, Eric C.H. de Bruyn has observed that the "perceptual ambivalence" in Pumhösl's work "merges an aesthetic and conceptual critique of the pictorial language of modernism in one gesture." In 2000, he was awarded the Monsignore Otto Mauer-Preis, followed by the CENTRAL-Kunstpreis in Cologne in 2003.

=== Major works and series ===
In 2005, Pumhösl held a solo show, Animated Map, at Neue Kunsthalle St. Gallen, Switzerland. Consisting of a film, a book, Pumhösl's Eetkamer glass paintings, and a correspondent exhibition, the project examined Pre-Columbian cotton lace from Chacay civilization, central coast of Peru (900–1532); a Picture clock (c. 1830); F. Percy Smith's film Fight for the Dardanelles (1915); László Moholy-Nagy's Schwarz-rotes Gleichgewicht (1922); the Bauhaus traveling exhibition installed by Hannes Meyer (1929); Georges Vantongerloo's Untitled (3 Concrete Studies) (c. 1931); and the former St. Gallen Public Warehouse erected in the beginning of the 20th century by Robert Maillart, and where the Neue Kunsthalle is now housed. The book, Animated Map, was published by Verlag der Buchhandlung Walter König in 2007, with texts by Peiro Aguirre, Burkhard Meltzer and Florian Pumhösl.

In 2007, Pumhösl presented the installation and picture cycle Modernology (2007), which was exhibited at documenta 12 in Kassel, Germany. For the project, Pumhösl identified and expressed in a formal vocabulary a reciprocal exchange between the German, Russian, and Japanese avant-gardes in the interwar period. Addressed in the work were artist-designer Murayama Tomoyoshi's Triangular Studio (1926) and the black walls of the "Der Sturm" exhibition in Tokyo in 1914, among others. Philosopher Juliane Rebentisch described the work as the following: "What may be experienced in this way is less the act of translation between the cultures than culture itself as translation...It opposes both the conservative notion of self-contained cultures as well as the neoliberal goal, currently becoming reality, of a single world culture."

Pumhösl staged an exhibition, 678, at Mumok in Vienna, Austria, in 2011. In this show, Pumhösl presented two film installations, Expressive Rhythm and Tract, and a comprehensive cycle of images, Diminution. Expressive Rhythm refers to Alexander Rodchenko's gouache Expressive Rhythm (1942), which anticipates Jackson Pollock's style of painting and serves as a testimony to the nexus between gestural abstraction, automation, and trauma. Tract is a film hybrid between abstract animation and a dance film. Diminution, a 48-image cycle whose name refers to the repetition and diminution of a motive in musical compositional theory, addresses 'a society' of images as understood spatially, or as a kind of post-individualist score. Parallel to the exhibition, Pumhösl also co-organized the re-installation of classical modern art on Level 8 of the museum with the title "Abstract Space" with curator Matthias Michalka. Michalka wrote that the exhibition "explor[ed] the relationship between the showing and the shown, between the title and the exhibition, inevitably result[ing] in a fundamental questioning of the conceptions of the work and the models of authorship..."

The following year, Pumhösl presented a new series at the Kunsthaus Bregenz, Räumliche Sequenz (Spatial Sequence), specially produced for the exhibition. The works consist of plaster panels in three different sizes grouped in threes, and the order of each trio beginning with the smallest and ending with the largest format. The progression of the 45-piece series of 15 subjects, subtitled Cliché, stems from Moholy-Nagy's enamel pictures. However, unlike Moholy-Nagy, who delegated the task of his telephone pictures to a firm, Pumhösl applied the formal effects to his panel himself through a cliché stamp. In an interview with Yilmaz Dziewior, remarking on the "varying relations" to which the pictures were hung, Pumhösl remarked that the series was "not site but space related."

In 2014, Pumhösl held his first solo exhibition at Miguel Abreu Gallery, in which he showed six paintings depicting formally reduced letters from the Georgian Mkhreduli alphabet and twelve paintings based on a 19th-century rabbinical map ("Eretz Israel," from Boundaries of the Land by Rabbi Joshua Feiwel ben Israel, Grodno, 1813). In transferring the map and interpreting Georgian letterforms, Pumhösl empties these systems of their use value and opens them up to other associations.

In the second issue of Makhuzine, an outgrowth of the Dutch Artistic Research Event (DARE) symposium, Pumhösl describes his work as the following:

In the last ten years, many arguments in the debate on Modernism have been dominated by arguments of critique, critical distance, and critical discourse. That widely criticized debate has become a messy discourse. My work connects to the prevalent discourse about artistic research, as it involves research, but for me research is only a tool leading to experience. Experience might sound like a conservative term, but I lack a better one. To me experience implies a process of reception and identification, of separating and displacing elements from genealogies."

== Solo exhibitions ==
Solo exhibitions of Pumhösl's work have been staged at Kunsthaus Bregenz (2012); Mumok (Vienna, 2011); Kunstverein für die Rheinlande und Westfalen (Düsseldorf, 2010); Musée d’Art Moderne Grand-Duc Jean (Luxembourg, 2009), Stedelijk Museum (Amsterdam, 2008); Neue Kunsthalle St. Gallen (2005); Centre d’édition contemporaine (Geneva, 2004); Kölnischer Kunstverein (Cologne, 2003); Secession (Vienna, 2000); and Salzburger Kunstverein (1998), among others. His work was featured in Documenta 12 (Kassel, 2007), São Paulo Biennial (2006) and the 50th Venice Biennale (2003). In 2015, his work was included in Parasophia: Kyoto International Festival of Contemporary Culture in Kyoto Municipal Museum of Art (2015). In 2012, he exhibited his work in Parcours, a two-person show at The Art Institute of Chicago with Liz Deschenes. Recently, Pumhösl's work has appeared in group exhibitions at the V-A-C Foundation (Venice), Punta della Dogana (Venice), The Museum der Moderne Salzburg, Haus Der Kunst (Munich), City Gallery Prague, Museum Abteiberg (Mönchengladbach), Generali Foundation (Vienna), MACBA (Barcelona), Raven Row (London), Künstlerhaus Vienna, Museum of Modern Art (Warsaw). He has had solo exhibitions at Miguel Abreu Gallery (New York), Galerie Buchholz (Cologne), Lisson Gallery (London), and Galerie Meyer Kainer (Vienna).

== Publications and catalogues ==
- Space Force Construction. Ed. ArtReview, London, 2017
- No One’s Voice. Hg./ed. Rhombus Press, Vienna 2016
- Florian Pumhösl. Spatial Sequenz: Works in Exhibitions 1993–2012. Hg./ed. Kunsthaus Bregenz, Yilmaz Dziewior, Bregenz, 2012
- Florian Pumhösl. 678, Hg./ed. Matthias Michalka Museum Moderner Kunst Stiftung Ludwig Wien, Köln 2011
- Florian Pumhösl, Hg./ed. Galerie Daniel Buchholz, Lisson Gallery, Buchhandlung Walther Koenig, Köln 2008
- Florian Pumhösl. Animated Map, Hg./ed. Burkhard Meltzer, Neue KunstHalle St. Gallen, Verlag der Buchhandlung Walther König, Köln 2007
- Wachstum und Entwicklung, Hg./ed. Silvia Eiblmayr/Galerie im Taxispalais, Revolver–Archiv für aktuelle Kunst, Frankfurt am Main 2003
- Florian Pumhösl. CENTRAL–Kunstpreis Kölnischer Kunstverein, Hg./ed. Kölnischer Kunstverein, Revolver–Archiv für aktuelle Kunst, Frankfurt, 2003
- Champs d’Expérience, Hg./ed. Bawag Foundation Edition, Wien 2002
- Florian Pumhösl, Hg./ed. Secession, Wien 2000

== Collections ==
- Pumhösl's work is held in major collections including Mumok, Vienna; Tate Modern, London; MOCA LA; Generali Foundation, Vienna; MACBA, Barcelona; Österreichische Galerie Belvedere, Vienna; Museo Reina Sofia, Madrid; Pinault Collection, Paris and Venice; and V-A-C Foundation, Venice.
