= Miguel Abreu Gallery =

Contemporary art gallery

Coordinates: 40.715818°N 73.991241°W

Miguel Abreu Gallery is a contemporary art gallery with two locations in New York City.

== History ==
Miguel Abreu Gallery opened its first space at 36 Orchard Street in 2006 on the Lower East Side of Manhattan in New York City. A second 8,000 square foot space was opened two blocks away at 88 Eldridge Street in 2014 to stage large scale projects and exhibitions. The gallery stages conceptually-charged one person and group shows as well as performances, film screenings, and lectures.

Sequence Press, the gallery's publishing division, was launched in 2011. In conjunction with the British publisher Urbanomic, the press has released books by philosophers and artists including François Laruelle, R.H. Quaytman, Nick Land, Quentin Meillassoux, and Gilles Châtelet, among others.

== Artists ==
The gallery represents American and international artists working in a range of media, including Yuji Agematsu, Rey Akdogan, Alexander Carver, Liz Deschenes, Rochelle Goldberg, Tishan Hsu, Gareth James, Flint Jamison, Sam Lewitt, Dana Lok, Scott Lyall, Jean-Luc Moulène, Florian Pumhösl, R.H. Quaytman, Eileen Quinlan, Raha Raissnia, Jimmy Raskin, Blake Rayne, Milton Resnick, and Pamela Rosenkranz. The gallery also represents the films of Jean-Marie Straub & Danièle Huillet, the estate of Wacław Szpakowski, and offer works by Hans Bellmer and James Metcalf.
