= Olivier Vadrot =

French artist and designer

- Born: 1970 (age 55–56); Semur-en-Auxois
- Occupations: Architect, artist
- Awards: Chevalier des Arts et des Lettres (2022)

Olivier Vadrot is a French artist and designer. His work incorporates many disciplines such as music, scenography and public furniture. He is known for his mobile architecture and exploration of the ergonomics of ancient theaters. His works have been exhibited at Centre Pompidou and at the 2017 Biennale of Architecture in Lyon. Some of his projects are part of the collections owned by French cultural institutions such as FRAC Aquitaine in Bordeaux, musée régional d'art contemporain Occitanie (Mrac), FRAC Paca in Marseille and Frac Île-de-France.

== Personal life ==
Olivier Vadrot was born in Semur-en-Auxois, France in 1970 and currently lives in Beaune, Burgundy.

== Career ==
After graduating with a degree in architecture from Lyon's National School of Architecture, Vadrot began his career as an assistant to the Japanese architect Shigeru Ban in France. Working alongside Ban from 1998 through 2001, he took part in creating the Cap Canal project at Centre D'interprétation Du Canal De Bourgogne. He also assisted Daniel Buren in the realisation of "Construction" a site specific installation presented at the centre d’art Le Consortium in Dijon (June 5 – July 25, 1998).

=== La Salle de Bains ===
In 1998, he founded La Salle de Bains, a 25sqm alternative exhibition space in Lyon, France with Lionel Mazelaygue and Gwenaël Morin. Vadrot described the space as a way "to engage in a dialogue with artists of the past generation", and "to get back to uninhibited architectural and design practice". Sixty-seven exhibitions were organized at La Salle de Bains in the period of 1999–2013, featuring artists such as Xavier Veilhan (2000), Olivier Mosset (2006), Gianni Motti (2007), Claude Closky (2003), Mrzyk & Moriceau (2006), Claude Lévêque (2002) and Matthew McCaslin (2002).

=== Cocktail Designers ===
Carrying on the multidisciplinary approach they had addressed during the previous years, in 2004, Vadrot and Mazelaygue founded the design group called 'Cocktail Designers', together with the two French graphic designers, Claire Moreux and Olivier Huz, with whom they had collaborated at La Salle de Bains. The same year, the group presented their first collection of objects named "Form Follows Function" at the experimental Galerie Roger Tator in Lyon, France. In the show, the group questioned the relationship between art and design by hijacking everyday shapes to create new ones. "I think some of our objects belong to both design and art, to the category we temporarily call "practical sculpture"", explained Vadrot in an interview to the French journalist Clément Nouet in 2006. "There is a long history of borrowings and references between art and design, the two disciplines mirror each other", he concluded. According to the journalist Olivier Reneau, the group adopted "the same aesthetic and conceptual concerns as those developed by the Dutch Droog Design and Moooi who work as much with recycling forms as with ideas." Following this first show, an updated version of "Form Follows Function" was also exhibited at La Chaufferie (Galerie de l'école supérieure des arts décoratifs – 5 rue de la Manufacture des Tabacs) in Strasbourg from January 13 through February 26, 2006.

=== Solo career and research on theaters ===
The first structure inspired by the shape of ancient theaters implemented by Vadrot was presented at the Villa Medici in Rome during his residency at the French Academy in 2011–2012. Named Circo Minimo, the project was intended as a nod to Rome's Circus Maximus and was designed to accommodate small-scale performances and debates. Subsequently, Vadrot visited several ancient theaters located in the Mediterranean region such as Delos, Priene and Syracuse, to study the ergonomics of their seating. This research was expressed in the Hors Les Murs 2016 programme, organised by the Institut Français. Following these field trips, in 2016, he developed Cavea, a nomadic platform made of plywood for the National Centre for Visual Arts (CNAP) in Paris. In 2018, the project was used as a backdrop to the conferences organised by the Centre Pompidou in Paris in the frame of the exhibition “May 68 – General Assembly” as well as on the occasion of the FIAC 2018.

Initially limited to the study of Greek and Roman theaters, Vadrot's corpus gradually spread to the theaters of the Renaissance and contemporary architecture such as that designed by Le Corbusier on the roof of Unité d’Habitation. Reinterpreting the project of the Swiss architect, in June 2015, Vadrot launched Les Tribunes, a scenographic device conceived during the "Make it work/The Negotiations Theatre" event organized by the theatre of Nanterre-Amandiers.

== Selected works ==
- Le Kiosque Électronique (2009)
- Minimo (2010)
- Précisions sur les Vagues, in collaboration with Célia Houdart and Sébastien Roux, coproduced by Centre dramatique national Orléans, Festival d’Avignon, Centre national de création musicale, La Muse en circuit, Stanza (2012)
- Coulisses (2013)
- La Veille, in collaboration with Célia Houdart, Sébastien Roux, Yannick Fouassier, Laurent Poitrenaux (voice) and the students of the Comédie in Reims (2013)
- Totem et tattoo (2014)
- A Catalogue of Steps & Diary of an Image, in collaboration with DD Dorvillier (2014)
- Le Vertugadin (2015)
- Les Tribunes (2015)
- Flash collection (2016)
- Cavea (2016)
- Pentélique (2016)
- Faire, c’est dire, in collaboration with Tectoniques Architectes (2017)
- La guérite de Marie (2018)
- Minimo (exhibition, 2018)
