= Mark Grotjahn =

American painter (born 1968)

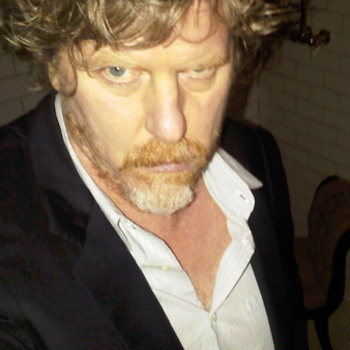
- Mark Grotjahn
- Born: 1968 (age 57–58); Pasadena, California, U.S.
- Occupation: Painter

Mark Grotjahn (born 1968) is an American painter best known for abstract work and bold geometric paintings. Grotjahn lives and works in Los Angeles.

== Early life and education ==
Grotjahn was born in Pasadena, but grew up in the Bay Area. His father Michael, a psychiatrist, had emigrated from Berlin, Germany, in 1936. His paternal grandfather is Martin Grotjahn. He received his MFA from the University of California, Berkeley, and his BFA from the University of Colorado at Boulder. In 1995, he was an artist-in-residence at the Skowhegan School of Painting and Sculpture in Madison, Maine. When he moved to Los Angeles in 1996, he opened a gallery called Room 702 in Hollywood with his classmate Brent Petersen and started showing and working with other artists. Despite an invitation to move into the 6150 complex on Wilshire Boulevard—which already housed other renowned galleries—Room 702 closed after less than two years, and Grotjahn became a full-time artist.

== Work ==
In the mid-1990s, Grotjahn began working on a stream of densely worked colored pencil drawings, followed by oil paintings, which focused on perspective investigations such as dual and multiple vanishing points. The way Grotjahn paints grew out of conceptual sign making; he would faithfully reproduce peculiar graphics and phrases from local storefronts in his native Los Angeles. He would then trade these handmade copies to the storeowners in exchange for the original signage.

Later Grotjahn began working with colored pencils to develop "perspective drawings" and then perspectival paintings. In his multi-colored drawings, Grotjahn's working method is systematic and rigorous but also allows for intuition and chance. He first begins by mapping out the triangular radii in black pencil. For each work in this series of drawings, Grotjahn then sets aside the required number of color pencils, choosing colors that "hold together" in value and intensity. Having laid them next to him, he chooses one pencil at random and uses it to color in a single, pre-segmented wing section.

Since 1997, Grotjahn has been exploring the radiant motif in his paintings and drawings. This sustained investigation is illustrated in his Butterfly series Here, he draws on Renaissance perspectival techniques for the structures and subjects of his multiple-vanishing-point butterfly patterns in order to create the illusion that his geometries stretch, shrink, approach, and recede. While they appear at first glance to be rigidly formal and graphic, the Butterfly Paintings essentially consist of a radiating sequence of parallel lines are executed in thick oil in such a way that an illusion of perspective is generated by the painting's butterfly form. The horizontal and vertical lines are rarely, if ever, horizontal or perpendicular to the edges of the canvas.

Grotjahn stopped painting the Butterfly works in 2008, after tearing his rotator cuff and breaking a shoulder bone after hitting an ice patch in a ski accident. As he could not paint for more than two hours at a time, he discovered less intensive ways of painting. A series of large, vertical Face Paintings is based on the simple geometric structure of the eyes, nose, and mouth. Using sheets of cardboard that are primed and mounted on linen as the ground, Grotjahn employs a brush and palette knife to extensively build layer upon layer of oil paint to almost sculptural ends.

Grotjahn's mask sculptures extend the artist's idiosyncratic investment in the process and ritual of painting into three dimensions. Cast in bronze from spontaneous cardboard assemblages and often painted with fingers, most of them rest on pedestals, while a few are wall-mounted, referring directly to painting.

Grotjahn maintains a studio in Little Armenia, Los Angeles. In 2011/12, he was Visiting Scholar at the California College of the Arts, San Francisco. In 2014, he joined the board of the Museum of Contemporary Art, Los Angeles as an artist trustee.

== Exhibitions ==
Grotjahn's solo exhibitions include shows at UCLA Hammer Museum in Los Angeles (2005); the Whitney Museum of American Art in New York (2006); and the Portland Art Museum, Oregon. His work has been exhibited in group exhibitions at galleries and museums such as the Museum of Contemporary Art, Chicago, P.S.1 Contemporary Art Center in New York, Museum am Ostwall, Dortmund, and Neuer Aachener Kunstverein, in Germany, and the Royal Academy in London. He was included in the 54th Carnegie International in 2004 and the Whitney Biennial in 2006.

== Collections ==
- Broad Art Foundation, Santa Monica, CA
- Hammer Museum, Los Angeles, CA
- Carnegie Museum of Art, Pittsburgh, PA
- Cleveland Museum of Art, Cleveland, OH
- Des Moines Art Center, Des Moines
- Museum of Contemporary Art, Los Angeles, CA
- Museum of Modern Art, New York, NY
- Walker Art Center, Minneapolis, MN
- Los Angeles County Museum of Art, Los Angeles, CA
- Rubell Family Collection, Miami, FL
- San Francisco Museum of Modern Art, San Francisco
- Stedelijk Museum, Amsterdam
- Whitney Museum of American Art, New York, NY

== Recognition ==
Grotjahn is the recipient of the 2003 Penny McCall Foundation Award. In 2011, he was honored with amfAR’s Award of Excellence for Artistic Contributions to the Fight Against AIDS.

== Influences ==
Grotjahn is often regarded as one of many contemporary painters revisiting late Modernism, alongside fellow painters Tomma Abts, Wade Guyton, Eileen Quinlan, Sergei Jensen, and Cheyney Thompson.

== Art market ==
Grotjahn had his first solo shows with Blum & Poe in 1998 and 2000, selling only one artwork from the second show. Demand for Grotjahn's works has climbed steadily in recent years, with prices now typically reaching $500,000 to $800,000. In 2010, Grotjahn's oil on linen painting Untitled (Lavender Butterfly Jacaranda over Green) (2004) was sold for $1.5 million against its presale estimate of $500–700,000 at Christie's New York. At Sotheby's New York in May 2015, one bidder paid $6.5 million for Grotjahn’s abstracted face painting, Untitled (Into and Behind the Green Eyes of the Tiger Monkey Face 43.18) (2011), against a high estimate of $3 million. On May 17, 2017 a new price record was set for a Grotjahn work at auction when “Untitled (S III Released to France Face 43.14)” was sold for $16.8 million dollars .

Grotjahn is represented by Anton Kern Gallery in New York, Gagosian Gallery in London, Blum and Poe Gallery in Los Angeles, Shane Campbell Gallery in Chicago and Kaikai Kiki Gallery in Tokyo.

=== Controversy on royalties ===
In 2011, Grotjahn sued MOCA trustee Dean Valentine, one of his earliest collectors, to recover a 5% royalty for three artworks that Valentine resold. The biggest sale in dispute took place in 2008 at Phillips de Pury & Company in New York, when Valentine sold Untitled (Blue Face Grotjahn) (2005) for $1,217,000, including premium. By Grotjahn's estimation, Valentine had made $3 million by selling the three artworks. After more than a year of court filings and court-ordered mediation, both parties settled the dispute in 2012 over the payment of the resale royalty specified by the California Resale Royalty Act. Valentine agreed to pay Grotjahn $153,255; this figure includes the 5% resale royalty (plus interest) on one painting and one drawing that the collector had bought and resold, amounting to $68,255, plus $85,000 toward Grotjahn’s legal fees.
