= Leila Khastoo =

American art curator, musician, and consultant

Leila Khastoo is an artist, musician and curator based in Los Angeles, California. She has exhibited or performed at the Hammer Museum (Los Angeles) and Kunsthalle Gwangju (South Korea).

== Career ==
=== Art curation ===
After working at Gagosian and Mary Goldman galleries, Khastoo founded her own space on Sunset Blvd in 2008 that emphasized the critical content of art and art making, with an art historical approach to programming. The gallery was featured in Blackbook, the New York Times and Wallpaper magazine's U.S. Top 40 for 2009. The gallery’s inaugural show The Crack Up featured work by Vito Acconci, Hans Bellmer, Pierre Molinier, Bas Jan Ader and Francesca Woodman among others. Other artists that have exhibited at Khastoo Gallery include: Aurelien Froment, Ryan Gander, Richard Tuttle, Zach Harris, and June Wayne. In 2010, Khastoo Gallery launched an exhibition titled The Alchemy of Things Unknown featuring work by Aleister Crowley, Harry Smith, Cameron, William Blake, Marilyn Manson, Kenneth Anger, Alfred Jensen and Susan Hiller. A performance by Jim Shaw and Dani Tull closed the show. Khastoo Gallery also represented several Iranian artists including Vahid Sharifian and the gallery closed in 2011 with a performance by Amir Mogharabi.

Khastoo’s curatorial work includes the exhibition Out-of-_____ that featured Chris Burden, Harun Farocki, Zoe Leonard, Jan Mancuska, Amie Siegel, James Turrell, Kerry Tribe, David Wojnarowicz and Francesco Vezzoli. The exhibition was held at Benevento Gallery in Los Angeles and traveled to Dohyang Lee Gallery in Paris. The show was reviewed in Artforum magazine and promoted via a trailer video made by Khastoo, edited by Dan O’Sullivan (aka Danozone).

In 2011 Khastoo was a featured performer in Marina Abramović's gala performance at the Museum of Contemporary Art Los Angeles. That same year she was also a part of the Gwangju Biennale Foundation’s 3rd International curatorial residency.

=== DJing ===
Since 2011 Khastoo has been DJing K-pop parties in LA and hosts a monthly K-pop radio show on KCHUNG called Super Kpop Sundays. She also writes and reports on K-pop for TheOneShots.com and Notion Magazine. In 2014 Khastoo was one of the producers and artists for KCHUNG Radio’s participation in the Hammer Museum’s Made in L.A. biennial and helped establish KCHUNG TV, a TV broadcast station within the museum’s lobby where KCHUNG community members filmed shows. That same year she DJ’d at the Levi's Commuter Workspace and The Lash Social. She makes her own music under the name Borders.

=== Consulting ===
She is currently consulting for brands with her creative consultancy ROOM6. And in 2016 she co-founded a design studio specializing in home goods and bicycle accessories called Ono, Inc.
