= Alfred Grotjahn =

German politician (1869–1931)

Alfred Grotjahnn
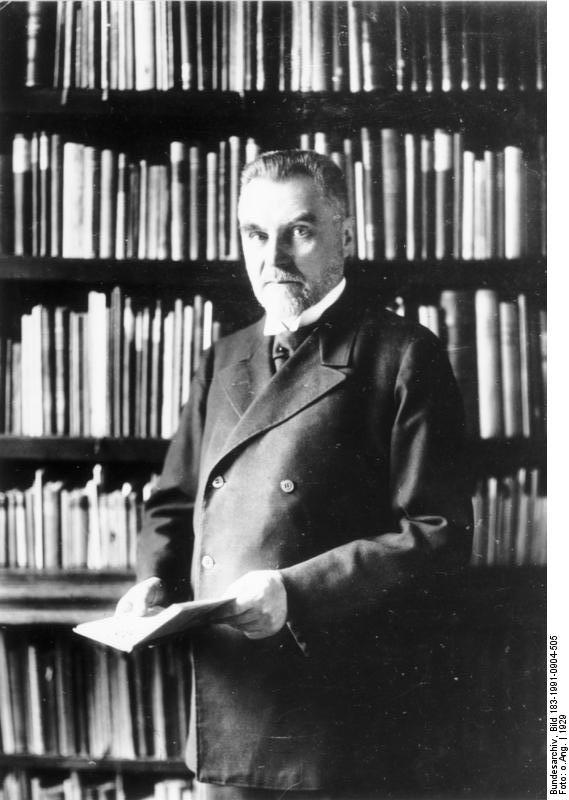
- Grotjahn in 1929
- Born: 25 November 1869; Schladen, Wolfenbüttel, Duchy of Brunswick, Germany
- Died: 4 September 1931 (aged 61); Berlin, Germany
- Education: Greifswald; Leipzig; Kiel; Berlin
- Occupations: Physician; Social hygienist Eugenicist; Journalist-author; Member of Parliament
- Political party: SPD
- Spouse: Charlotte Hartz (1881–1945)
- Children: Gertrud; Martin (1904–1990); Peter (1907–1943)
- Parents: Robert Grotjahn (1841–1908) (father); Emma Frey (1845–1875) (mother)

Alfred Grotjahn (25 November 1869 – 4 September 1931) was a German physician, social hygienist, eugenicist, journalist-author and, for three years between 1921 and 1924, a Member of the Reichstag (national parliament) in the recently launched German republic.

Grotjahn became celebrated as a pioneer, and among admirers an inventor, of the discipline of "social hygiene" which, in Germany, was not merely an ephemeral euphemism for the sociological study of sexually transmitted diseases, but embraced a series of topics along the interface between sociology and medicine.

When at first he publicised his ideas at the start of the 20th century he encountered a barrage of opposition from the powerful and increasingly politicised eugenics lobby, but during the next three decades some of his own thinking came closer to that of the eugenicists: by the time he died he was sometimes identified as part of the eugenics movement.

After he died, many of his ideas remained mainstream in Germany and among some medical scholars in North America through the 1930s, but by 1945 they had become discredited across Europe, alongside those of the eugenics movement itself, by their association with the Hitlerite atrocities. Within Germany, despite a few of his ideas turning up as government policy, Grotjahn was in the short term airbrushed out of history during the 1930s on account of his Jewish provenance. His son emigrated to the United States in 1937, ending up in Los Angeles, where he acquired notability on his own account as a psychoanalyst.

== Biography ==
=== Provenance and early years ===
Alfred Grotjahn was born and spent his early childhood in Schladen, a small town / large village in the Harz foothills south of Braunschweig. He was born into a medical family. His grandfather, Heinrich Grotjahn (1794–1872), had accompanied the Prussian army to the Battle of Waterloo as an army surgeon and acquired a reputation for his skills as a practitioner of survivable limb amputations. His father, Robert Grotjahn (1841–1908) was another physician. His father was also a morphine addict, in the habit of signing in as a hospital patient for treatment. His mother, born Emma Frey (1845–1875) had met his father in her home city of Zürich where Robert Grotjahn had been a medical student. Alfred Grotjahn was only 6 when his mother died of sarcoma. The next year his father married his mother's sister, who sent through life with a long-standing diagnosis as a manic-depressive, which involved frequent stays away at sanitoria. Alfred Grotjahn would look back on his childhood as an unhappy one. His Nocturnal enuresis led to frequent beatings or being locked in the cellar, or being humiliated in front of the servants by having to his bedding while they were obliged to look on. His initial schooling was undertaken at the village school, but when he was ten he was sent away to nearby Wolfenbüttel where between 1882 and 1890 he boarded with the local pastor who ran a classical boarding school, and evidently provided an excellent education. A friend and near contemporary at the school was Albert Südekum (1871–1944), the son of a local publican from whom he acquired what would become a life-long interest in politics and in the movement that, once the Anti-Socialist Laws lapsed, would be rebranded and relaunched in 1890 as the Social Democratic Party.

=== Student years ===
Having considered a career in Journalism and rejected it because he had no confidence in his ability as a public speaker, which he believed would have been part of the necessary skills set, Grotjahn undertook his university-level education in Medicine between 1890 and 1894, successively at Greifswald, Leipzig, Kiel and Berlin. He was a pacificist by temperament, and in addition to respecting family tradition, he was conscious that in the event of another war involving conscription, a medical training would be likely to qualify him for a reduced term of service on the frontline, because he would be of greater usefulness to his country as a physician than as a soldier. At Greifswald he read assiduously the works of socialist thinkers including Marx, Engels, Kautsky and Mehring. This provided a firm grounding for his later work which, he would maintain, remained steeped in his enduring sense of solidarity with the labour movement. During his second year, studying at Leipzig University he was taught Anatomy by Wilhelm His and Physiology by Carl Ludwig. He deferred moving in to Berlin, discouraged by his father from making the move to a city with "certain political distractions", so his third year, which was his first clinical year. was spent at Kiel where Friedrich von Esmarch headed up the teaching of Surgery while Gynaecology was taught by Richard Werth who, unusually, provided students with opportunities to undertake clinical examinations of real patients. He also took the opportunity to sign up for lectures in Sociology with Ferdinand Tönnies who had a poor reputation as a lecturer and whose course only attracted two students. The other one was Albert Südekum. It was determined that instead of occupying a lecture there the students should learn about Sociology walking round the town engaged in intense discussion, an arrangement which evidently suited all three of them. A number of Tönnies’ students, including Grotjahn and Südekum, became long-term friends of their Kiel sociology teacher. It is striking that many of these were (or subsequently became) closely associated with the Social Democratic Party.

By 1894, despite his father's earlier misgivings, Grotjahn had moved on to Berlin. He received his qualification as a medical doctor that same year from the Berlin Neuropathies Clinic ("... Poliklinik für Nervenkranke") where he then worked as a medical assistant for two years. In 1896 he passed the state exams that entitled him to practice as a fully qualified medical practitioner.

=== Physician in Berlin-Kreuzberg ===
In 1896 Alfred Grotjahn opened his own medical practice in Berlin- Kreuzberg. As a newly qualified physician in general practice he was notably meticulous and detailed in compiling his case notes, which survive and provide a rare, detailed insight into the nature of his work and, reflecting his broader interests, of the general relationship between doctors and their patients at the end of the nineteenth century. Between October 1896 and March 1899 there were 3,760 consultations involving approximately 700 different patients. His records detail the addresses and occupations of patients, along with fees charged and diagnoses pronounced. The level of detail and the quantity of background social context recorded by Grotjahn are exceptional. There is abundant scope for statistical analysis of the data provided.

=== Sharing insights on alcoholism, nutrition and society ===
During the early months, while he was still building up his practice and had not yet attracted a full complement of patients, he produced the first in a succession of academic papers dealing with topics of equal concern to sociologists and to physicians. His paper "Der Alkoholismus nach Wesen, Wirkung u. Verbreitung" ("The nature, the impact and the distribution of alcohol addiction") was published in 1898. His theme was the interaction between alcoholism, health care provision and housing conditions. He very soon extended his researches to take in and share further detailed research into the impacts of workplace alcoholism. During 1901 and 1902 Grotjahn participated at the Socio-politics seminars of Gustav von Schmoller, whose approach, interests and conclusions evidently resonated in some respects with his own. In 1905 Grotjahn was one of those behind the establishment of the "Berlin Society for Social Medicine, Hygiene and Medical Statistics". By this time the social hygienist movement was attracting opposition. Grotjahn's published work on the multiple impacts arising from rapid changes in the diets of factory workers when they moved from the countryside, where most of their food was locally grown, to the cities, where food increasingly emanated more directly from factories than from farms, cut across the intensive if arguably over simplistic research work of the influential Max Rubner on food energy and its measurement: according to at least one commentator Ribner was able to use his influence to hamper Grotjahn's academic career progress.

=== Habilitation ===
On 16 November 1912 Alfred Grotjahn received his Habilitation, the higher post-graduate degree normally needed to secure a life-long teaching career in the German universities sector. He was the first candidate in Germany to habilitate in the newly fashionable discipline of "social hygiene". After receiving his degree Grotjahn worked for several years as a university "Privatdozent" (loosely, "tutor") at the Charité, which was the largest and, some believed, the most prestigious of Berlin's university hospitals.

In 1915, after twenty years, Grotjahn withdrew from running his own medical practice and instead accepted a position in charge of the social hygiene department at the Berlin City Medical Office. In 1919, he became Medical Director of the Berlin Housing Department, focusing on the need to use post-war city housing development as a tool for improving health and welfare, applying some of the ideas adumbrated in Hellerau and, in Garden Cities of To-morrow in England, by Ebenezer Howard and others. Meanwhile in Germany military defeat was followed by the fall of the monarchy and, especially in the ports and cities, intensified economic hardship, and a succession of frequently localised revolutions during 1918/19. As the political backdrop became ever more unpredictable, in 1920 the newly installed Social Democratic (de: Kultusministerium Prussian Minister for the Arts and Education), Konrad Haenisch, installed Alfred Grotjahn as the first Ordinary (i.e. full) Professor for Social Hygiene at the and University of Berlin. Despite having been a long-standing supporter of the Social Democratic Party, Grotjahn had only become a party member in 1919. The professorial appointment was remarkable in several respects. Grotjahn became the first Professor for Social Hygiene anywhere in Germany. Furthermore, the minister made the appointment in direct defiance of the university medical faculty. His old opponent Max Rubner made every effort to belittle him in front of colleagues at his inauguration, with the result that for several years Grotjahn did not bother to attend faculty meetings. Nevertheless, he retained then professorship for the rest of his life. As the decade progressed animosities within the faculty subsided and, supported by his growing public profile outside the university, he managed to gain a measure of acceptance with members of the university establishment. He increasingly attended faculty meetings and, indeed, mane use of the detritus they produced. After attendees had departed at the end of the meetings he would rummage in the waste paper bins and pull out discarded notes by colleagues which he thought might be of interest for his further researches on psychological aspects of Social Hygiene. By 1927, where he was proposed to serve a year as dean of faculty, there were only two votes against the proposal.

=== Politics ===
In July 1914 Grotjahn had greeted with enthusiasm the controversial acceptance by the Social Democratic party leaders in parliament to support war funding with their Reichstag votes. Almost immediately after that, however, he had been appalled by the violation of Belgian neutrality in August 1914. The tension between his patriotic commitment and pacifist convictions remained unresolved when he re-joined the party in Autumn 1919. Looking to the future, he was nevertheless able fully to back the mission of the government under President Ebert's to build a better future for the German Republic, and to take a lead when it came to developments in social medicine. He was included as a list candidate for the 1920 General Election, but due to a strong challenge from the breakaway Independent Social Democratic Party it turned out that his name had appeared one place too far down the party list for him to secure election to the Reichstag for him to secure a seat. He had nevertheless participated effectively in the election campaign, cementing his links with a number of more longstanding party activists in the process. In April 1921 his party comrade, the lawyer Max Frank, resigned his Reichstag seat for "professional reasons" and Alfred Grotjahn, as the most highly placed of the list candidates who had failed to secure election the previous year, automatically took over the seat vacated by Frank. He became one of six qualified medical practitioners in the parliament though only one other of these, Friedrich Börschmann, was a Social Democratic Party member.

He served as a member of the Reichstag between 1921 and 1924 (or 1923: sources differ). He combined his parliamentary duties with his professorial work at and the university and with further written contributions on "social hygiene which by this time, in terms of his own thinking, was becoming increasingly indistinguishable from more mainstream Eugenics. There are records of only seven occasions on which he addressed the Reichstag, but behind the scenes he was actively engaged in committee work involved in the framing of legislation on child welfare and on sexually transmitted disease. His interest in other socio-hygiene themes at the interface of medicine and sociology, such as alcoholism, nutrition, and housing and the need to reduce the fecundity of certain groups continued to feature prominently. He was unimpressed by his parliamentary colleagues, characterising several as "psychopaths", but added the reassuring observation that "psychopaths in politics in parliamentary seats" were less of a menace than psychopaths sitting "on thrones". As Social Democratic Reichstag member he was also invited to draft proposals to be included in the important Görlitz Programme. The task turned out to involve drawing up the entire health policy section of the party programme, which was adopted as party policy at the Görlitz party congress at the end of 1921. It was the first time since 1891 that the party had produced a comprehensive programme for government on this scale, and the first time that such a programme had ever been produced while the party was actually in power.

== Personal life ==
In 1900, Grotjahn married Charlotte Hartz (1881–1945). The bride's family were by this time based in Berlin. Between 1901 and 1907 the couple had three recorded children, two of whom became university professors. These included the Los Angeles-based Psychology professor Martin Grotjahn (1904–1990).

== Work on social hygiene and the shift towards eugenics ==
In 1900 Alfred Grotjahn and Freidrich Kriegel produced the first edition what became an annual publication on social hygiene and demography, the Jahresbericht über die Fortschritte und Leistungen auf dem Gebiete der sozialen Hygiene und Demographie. Over the next ten years Grotjahn took a lead in developing social hygiene as an increasingly mainstream discipline. Definition of the theory proves something of a movable feast, but probably the most important summary is represented by his book Soziale Pathologie, which became an influential teaching text following its publication in 1912. He set out his case that the social surroundings of patients will have an influence both on the course taken by a disease and on their healing. At the start of the century the contention found little resonance with the medical and academic establishments. The fashion was for science-based medicine, inspired by Robert Koch's discoveries in the field of bacteriology and there was little appetite for conflating observation-based scientific conclusions with seemingly woolly opinions about social conditions. The conveniently readable "Handwörterbuch der Sozialen Hygiene" (loosely, "Pocket Lexicon of Social Hygiene") which Grotjahn published jointly with the Austrian professor Ignaz Kaup (1870–1944) triggered a rethink, however.

Initially Grotjahn found his theories being attacked by supporters of eugenics, but by the mid 1920s he was himself moving towards them. He was a prolific writer and not, over time, consistent in all his writings, which can make it hard to pick out the most representative. There can, in any event, be no doubt that he became a member of the so-called "Society for Racial Hygiene" at its launch in 1905, even if later commentators may differ spectacularly over the relevant definitions according to the differing perspectives driven from their own times and socio-political convictions. In 1926 he published a piece entitled "Hygiene der menschlichen Fortpflanzung" (loosely, "Hygiene of human reproduction") which contains disturbing echoes of Hitlerite racial precepts. It calls for the "planned eradication through detention and enforced sterilization" of individuals burdened by inherited deficiencies thereby, in the eyes of detractors, placing Grotjahn among the most extreme and uncompromising eugenicists of the decade. He emerged as an advocate for the "rationalisation of human reproduction quantitively and qualitatively", advocating a "cleansing of human society from the sick, the ugly and the inferior", whom he reckoned accounted between them, for approximately one third of the population. He went even further with his call for forced sterilisation of those identified as the feeble minded, epileptics, alcoholics and cripples, on the basis of which he recommended "permanent confinement" for approximately 1% of the population.
