= Martin Grotjahn =

Martin Grotjahn (July 8, 1904 - September 30, 1990) was a German-born American psychoanalyst who was known for his contributions to the field of psychoanalysis. He was the son of doctor Alfred Grotjahn and was born in Berlin, Germany.

In 1938, Grotjahn fled Nazi Germany and emigrated to the United States with his Jewish wife Etelka Grosz, daughter of doctor Gyula Grosz, and their one-year-old son. He worked as a psychoanalyst in Chicago in the clinic of psychiatrist Karl Menninger before moving to Los Angeles, where he became one of the founding members of the Los Angeles Psychoanalytic Institute. He settled in Los Angeles, where he continued his psychoanalytic training at the Los Angeles Psychoanalytic Society and Institute. A few years later, when that institute split, he became the first dean of the Southern California Institute for Psychoanalysis.

Grotjahn was certified as a psychoanalyst by the American Psychoanalytic Association in 1950 and served on the faculty of the Los Angeles Psychoanalytic Institute for over 30 years. He was a training and supervising analyst and also served as a professor of psychiatry at the University of Southern California School of Medicine and University of California, Los Angeles, where he taught courses on psychoanalytic theory and technique. Grotjahn was known for his work on ego psychology, which emphasizes the importance of the ego in psychological functioning. He also made significant contributions to the understanding of narcissism, a personality trait characterized by a grandiose sense of self-importance and a lack of empathy for others. Grotjahn was a prolific writer and lecturer and authored numerous articles and book chapters on psychoanalytic theory and technique, as well as a number of books.

Grotjahn was widely respected in the psychoanalytic community for his contributions to the field. He was a Fellow of the American Psychoanalytic Association and served as president of the Los Angeles Psychoanalytic Society and Institute. Grotjahn also received numerous awards and honors for his work, including the Sigourney Award in 1994, which recognizes outstanding contributions to the field of psychoanalysis. He became a very well known psychoanalyst and was one of the first to deal with the trauma of aging.

Grotjahn continued to work and teach until shortly before Grotjahn died Sept. 30 of heart disease at Cedars-Sinai Medical Center. He is remembered as a pioneering figure in the field of psychoanalysis, whose insights and ideas continue to influence the way we think about the mind and human behavior. Grotjahn's legacy also extends to his family; his grandson is the painter Mark Grotjahn.

== Literature ==
- Christoph Kaspari: Alfred Grotjahn (1869-1931) - Life and Work . Bonn, Univ., Diss., 1989 [therein pp. 371–387 Chap. 'Alfred Grotjahn and his son Martin'.
- Moreau Ricaud M .: Martin Grotjahn (1904-1990). Revue International d'histoire de la Psychoanalysis 4, Histoire de l'édition des oeuvres de Freud - Psychoanalysis et anthropology, 697, Paris, PUF, 1991
- Karl Jung: Life and work of the psychiatrist Martin Grotjahn, 1904. Mainz University, Dissertation, 1979
