= Marcella Lista =

French curator

Marcella Lista is a French curator and art historian. She is chief curator at the Centre Pompidou.

== Career ==
In 2004 she was responsible for the Auditorium du Louvre contemporary art and architecture program. With Sophie Duplaix she curated the exhibition Sons & Lumières, A history of sound in 20th Century at the Centre Pompidou. In 2011 she was in residency at the Villa Médicis to research "dance, modernity and abstraction, 1910-1930". Lista is the chief curator of the New Media Collection at the Centre Pompidou since 2016. She curated the two inaugural exhibitions at the Centre Pompidou x West Bund Museum The Shape of Time, Highlights of the Centre Pompidou Collection and Observations, Highlights of the New Media Collection in 2019.

== Bibliography (selection) ==
- Sons et Lumières: une histoire du son dans l’art du 20e siècle (co-direction with Sophie Duplaix). Paris: Éditions du Centre Pompidou, 2004. ISBN 978-2-844262448
- L’œuvre d’art totale à la naissance des avant-gardes (1908-1914). Paris: Éditions de l’Institut National d’Histoire de l’Art, 2006. ISBN 978-2-735505456
- Corps étrangers : danse, dessin, film : Francis Bacon, William Forsythe, Peter Welz... Lyon: Fage Editions and Paris: Musée du Louvre, 2006. ISBN 978-2-84975-105-3
- Paul Klee, 1879-1940: polyphonies. Arles: Actes Sud, 2011. ISBN 978-2-330000530
- Suzanne Lafont: Situations. La Garenne Colombes: Bernard Chauveau Editeur, 2015. ISBN 978-236306-142-3
- Ryoji Ikeda: Continuum. Paris: Xavier Barral Editeur, 2018. ISBN 978-2-36511-190-4
- Hassan Khan: blind ambition. Paris: Éditions du Centre Pompidou, 2022. ISBN 978-2-844268877
- Chris Marker. Survivances de Zapping Zone: (1990-1994). Paris: Éditions du Centre Pompidou, 2024. ISBN 978-2-844269386
