= Jean Maheu =

French government official (1931–2022)

Président-directeur général of Radio France
- In office 1989–1995
- Preceded by: Roland Faure
- Succeeded by: Michel Boyon

President of the Centre Pompidou
- In office 1983–1989
- Preceded by: Jean-Claude Groshens
- Succeeded by: Helene Ahrweiler

Personal details
- Born: 24 January 1931 16th arrondissement of Paris, France
- Died: 9 January 2022 (aged 90)

Jean Maheu (24 January 1931 – 9 January 2022) was a French government official.

== Life and career ==
Maheu was the son of Director-General of UNESCO René Maheu and Inès Allafort du Verger. He studied at the Lycée Claude Bernard in Paris and at the Lycée Pasteur in Neuilly-sur-Seine. He then took classes at Sciences Po and the École nationale d'administration. On 27 July 1956, he married Isabelle Viennot with whom he had six children: Emmanuel, Anne, Sophie, Pascale, Jean-Philippe and Delphine.

In 1958, Maheu began working for the Court of Audit and joined the Comité Rueff-Armand the following year. From 1962 to 1967, he served as Secretary General of the Presidency of the French Republic under Charles de Gaulle. He then served as a secretary to the Minister of Sports from 1967 to 1974.

He was active in the world of music, working for the Ministry of Culture as a lyricist and directing the Orchestre de Paris from 1974 to 1979. He was also vice-president of the Paris Opera. In 1983, he was named President of the Centre Pompidou, succeeding Jean-Claude Groshens. In 1989, he was named Président-directeur général of Radio France, a position he held until 1995. As part of this mandate, he became a member of the Conseil supérieur de la langue française, a member of the board of directors of Agence France-Presse and a member of Public Francophone Radios.

Maheu was President of the Maison de la poésie de la Ville de Paris from 1995 to 1998. He then became President of the Board of Directors of the Théâtre de la Ville in 1996, President of the Centre national de la photographie in 1996, and President of the Association des Centres culturels de rencontres in 1997.

He was an associate professor at Sciences Po from 1959 to 1970, an associated professor at Paris-Sorbonne University from 1994 to 1997, and later an associate professor at the University of Évry Val d'Essonne.

Maheu died on 9 January 2022, at the age of 90.

== Publications ==
- Les Nus et les Trembles (1984)
- Un été de sel (1989)
- Le Ravissement de l'île (1992)
- L'ébloui (2004)
- Naissance du vertige (2009)

== Decorations ==
- Officer of the Legion of Honour
- Grand Officer of the Ordre national du Mérite
- Officer of the Ordre des Palmes académiques
- Commander of the Ordre des Arts et des Lettres
- Officer of the Order of Merit of the Federal Republic of Germany
- Order of the Rising Sun
