= Michele Abeles =

American artist and photographer

- Born: 1977 (age 48–49); New York City
- Education: Washington University in St. Louis (BA); Yale University (MFA)
- Known for: Photography
- Awards: Rema Hort Mann, Visual Arts Grantee 2010; Richard Benson Award, Excellence in Photography, Yale University, 2007

Michele Abeles (born 1977) is an American visual artist and photographer.

== Life and work ==
Michele Abeles was born in 1977 in New York. She graduated with a B.A. in Psychology from Washington University in St. Louis, and has an M.F.A. in photography from Yale University. Her photographs combine everyday objects such as bottles, pots, rocks, and scraps of paper with flashes of bright color and fragments of male bodies.

== Exhibitions ==
=== Selected solo exhibitions ===
- Zebra, 47 Canal, New York (2016)
- Baby Carriage on Bike or Riot Shield as Carriage, Whitney Museum of American Art, New York (2015)
- Find Out What Happens When People Start Getting Real, Sadie Coles HQ, London (2014)
- English for Secretaries, 47 Canal Street, New York (2013)
- Αγγλικά για Γραμματείς, Andreas Melas & Helena Papadopoulos, Athens (2013)
- Frame, Frieze, New York (2012)
- Re:Re:Re:Re:Re:, 47 Canal, New York (2011)

=== Selected group exhibitions ===
- DIDING – An Interior That Remains an Exterior?, Kunstlerhaus, Graz, Austria (2015)
- Second Chances, Aspen Art Museum, Aspen, Colorado, USA (2015)
- A World of its Own: Photographic Practices in the Studio, Museum of Modern Art, New York (2014)
- Test Pattern, Whitney Museum of Art, New York (2013)
- Empire State, curated by Norman Rosenthal and Alex Gartenfeld, Palazzo delle Esposizioni, Rome, Italy (2013)
- Speculations on Anonymous Materials, Fridericianum, Kassel, Germany (2013)
- New Photography 2012, Museum of Modern Art, New York (2012)
- Greater New York 2010, MOMA PS1, Long Island City (NY) (2010)
