= Centre Pompidou =

Art museum in Paris, France

Coordinates: 48°51′38″N 2°21′08″E

Centre Georges Pompidou
- Logo designed by Jean Widmer

General information
- Type: Cultural center
- Architectural style: Postmodern / high-tech
- Location: Paris, France
- Completed: 1971–1977

Technical details
- Structural system: Steel superstructure with reinforced concrete floors

Design and construction
- Architects: Renzo Piano, Richard Rogers, and Gianfranco Franchini
- Structural engineer: Arup
- Services engineer: Arup

Website
- www.centrepompidou.fr/en/

The Centre Pompidou (French pronunciation: [sɑ̃tʁ pɔ̃pidu]), more fully the Centre national d'art et de culture Georges-Pompidou (lit. 'Georges Pompidou National Centre of Art and Culture'), also known as the Pompidou Centre in English and colloquially as Beaubourg, is a building complex in Paris, France. It was designed in the style of high-tech architecture by the architectural team of Richard Rogers, Su Rogers and Renzo Piano, along with Gianfranco Franchini. It is named after Georges Pompidou, the President of France from 1969 to 1974 who commissioned the building, and was officially opened on 31 January 1977 by President Valéry Giscard d'Estaing.

Centre Pompidou is located in the Beaubourg area of the 4th arrondissement of Paris. It houses the Bibliothèque publique d'information (BPI; Public Information Library), a vast public library, and the Musée National d'Art Moderne, the largest museum for modern art in Europe. The Place Georges Pompidou is an open plaza in front of the museum.

The Centre Pompidou was closed for renovation in September 2025. It is expected to reopen in 2030 upon the project's completion. Exhibitions and other cultural activities continue at partner venues in France and abroad. The BPI will be temporarily relocated to its Lumière building.

== History ==
=== Foundation ===
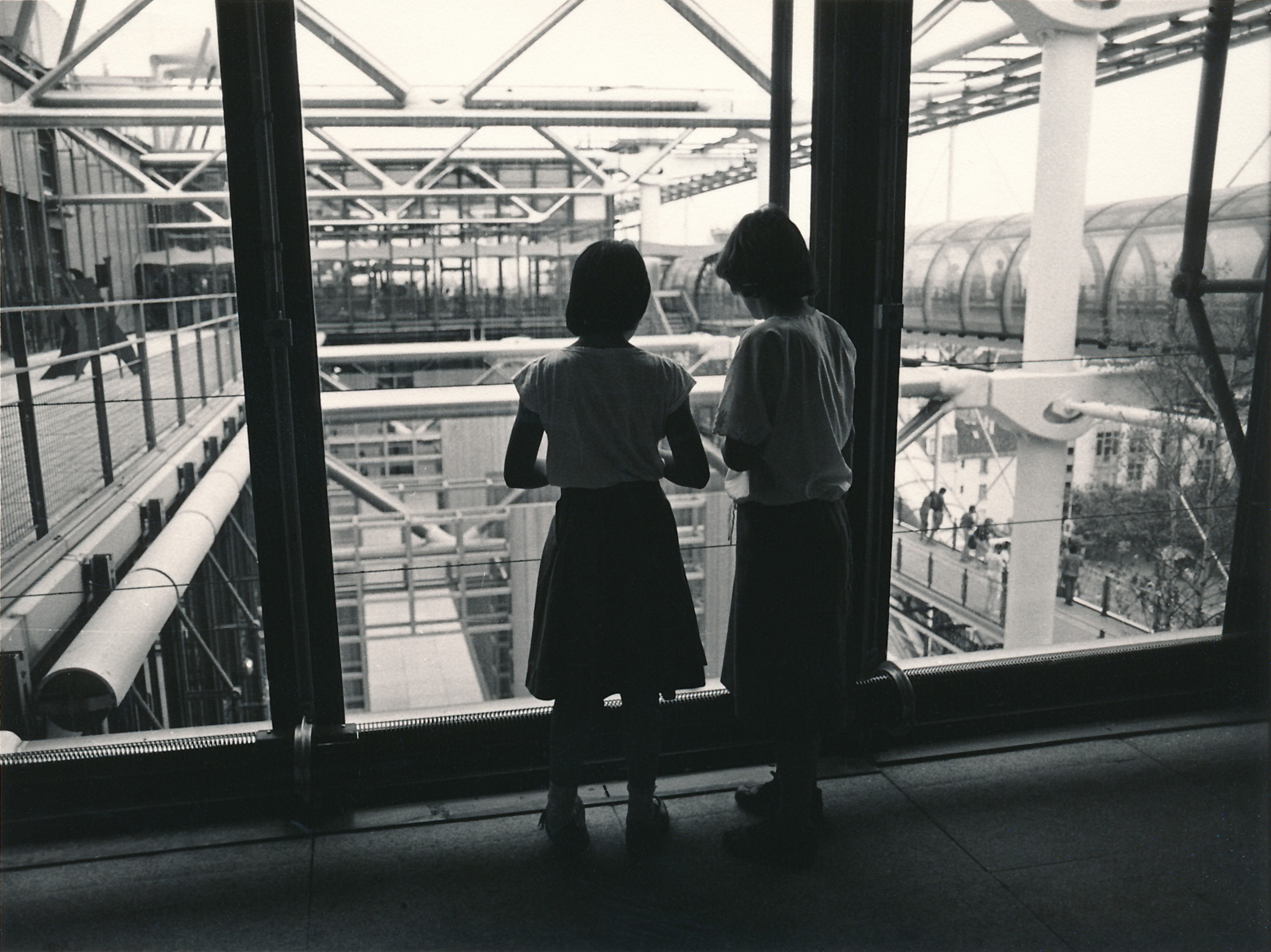
Interior of the Centre Georges Pompidou in 1986

The idea for a multicultural complex, bringing together different forms of art and literature in one place, developed, in part, from the ideas of France's first Minister of Cultural Affairs, André Malraux, a proponent of the decentralisation of art and culture by impulse of the political power. In the 1960s, city planners decided to move the food markets of Les Halles, historically significant structures long prized by Parisians, with the idea that some of the cultural institutes be built in the former market area. Hoping to renew the idea of Paris as a leading city of culture and art, it was proposed to move the Musée d'Art Moderne to this new location. Paris also needed a large, free public library, as one did not exist at this time. At first the debate concerned Les Halles, but as the controversy settled, in 1968, President Charles de Gaulle announced the Plateau Beaubourg as the new site for the library.

In 1969, Georges Pompidou, the new president, adopted the Beaubourg project and decided it to be the location of both the new library and a centre for the contemporary arts. In the process of developing the project, the IRCAM (Institut de Recherche et Coordination Acoustique/Musique) was also housed in the complex.

=== Design selection ===
The Rogers and Piano design was chosen among 681 competition entries. World-renowned architects Oscar Niemeyer, Jean Prouvé, and Philip Johnson made up the jury. It was the first time in France that international architects were allowed to participate. The selection was announced in 1971 at a press conference, where the contrast between the sharply-dressed Pompidou and "hairy young crew" of architects represented a "grand bargain between radical architecture and establishment politics."

=== 2025–2030 closure and international expansion ===
A major renovation is due to take place between 2025 and 2030. The Centre Pompidou is closed from 2 March 2025 until 2030.The BPI is temporarily relocated to its Lumière building at 40 avenue des Terroirs de France on 25 August 2025.

On 22 September 2025, the Centre Pompidou announced its full closure for a major renovation project scheduled to last until 2030. Although preparatory closures had begun earlier in the year, with the suspension of access to parts of the collection and the relocation of the Bibliothèque publique d'information (BPI), the complete shutdown marked the start of the modernization phase. The renovation aims to remove asbestos, upgrade technical systems, improve accessibility, and enhance the building's energy efficiency while preserving its architectural identity. The project is being led by the architectural firm Moreau Kusunoki, in collaboration with Frida Escobedo.

While the renovation is underway, Centre Pompidou will internationally expand, opening its first South American space in 2027. The new $240 million satellite is scheduled to launch in November 2027 and will be located in Foz do Iguaçu, Brazil. Centre Pompidou plans to continue its satellite expansion in other locations, such as Shanghai and Málaga. A North American satellite is currently approved for construction in Jersey City, New Jersey; however in February 2026, the Mayor of Jersey City announced that the project would not go forward.

At the same time, the Centre Pompidou launched the program "Constellation", designed to display its national collection across France and internationally. Early Constellation projects included exhibitions in Lille, Metz, and Monaco.

== Architecture ==
=== Design ===
Building technology

Richard Rogers and Renzo Piano, two emerging architects in their thirties, designed the first major example of an "inside-out" building with its structural system, mechanical systems, and circulation exposed on the exterior of the building, reflecting their belief that they had no chance of winning the commission. Gianfranco Franchini was also involved in the design.

Explaining the ideas that informed the Centre Pompidou's design, Piano said, "Our idea was a museum that would inspire curiosity, not intimidate people, and that would open up culture to all... Our credo was a place for all people – for the poor and rich, the young and old".

The daring design increased the efficiency of interior space utilization. Initially, all of the functional structural elements of the building were colour-coded: green pipes are plumbing, blue ducts are for climate control, electrical wires are encased in yellow, and circulation elements and devices for safety (e.g., fire extinguishers) are red. According to Piano, the design was meant to be "not a building but a town where you find everything – lunch, great art, a library, great music".

The Centre Pompidou, initially met with dismay akin to the Eiffel Tower's reception in its time, is now widely regarded as an artwork in its own merit. National Geographic described the reaction to the design as "love at second sight." An article in Le Figaro declared: "Paris has its own monster, just like the one in Loch Ness." But two decades later, while reporting on Rogers' winning the Pritzker Prize in 2007, The New York Times noted that the design of the Centre "turned the architecture world upside down" and that "Mr. Rogers earned a reputation as a high-tech iconoclast with the completion of the 1977 Pompidou Centre, with its exposed skeleton of brightly coloured tubes for mechanical systems". The Pritzker jury said the Pompidou "revolutionised museums, transforming what had once been elite monuments into popular places of social and cultural exchange, woven into the heart of the city."

=== Construction ===
The centre was built by GTM and completed in 1977. The building cost 993 million French francs. Renovation work conducted from October 1996 to January 2000 was completed on a budget of 576 million francs. The principal engineer was the renowned Peter Rice, responsible for, amongst other things, the Gerberette. During the renovation, the centre was closed to the public for 27 months, re-opening on 1 January 2000.

Following several logistical delays, the official renovation timeline was finalized for a late-2025 closure with a projected reopening in 2030. The budget for the 'Action Centre Pompidou 2030' project is estimated at €262 million, covering technical modernization and the total removal of asbestos.

Building specifications
| Land area | 2 hectares (5 acres) |
| Floor area | 103,305 m^{2} |
| Superstructure | 7 levels |
| Height | 42 m (Rue Beaubourg side), 45.5 m (Piazza side) |
| Length | 166 m |
| Width | 60 m |
| Infrastructure | 3 levels |
| Dimensions | Depth: 18 m; Length: 180 m; Width: 110 m |
Materials used
| Earthworks | 300,000 m^{3} |
| Reinforced concrete | 50,000 m^{3} |
| Metal framework | 15,000 tonnes of steel |
| Façades, glass surfaces | 11,000 m^{2} |
| Opaque surfaces | 7,000 m^{2} |

== Description and components ==
Because of its location (in the Beaubourg area of the 4th arrondissement of Paris, near Les Halles, rue Montorgueil, and the Marais), the centre is known locally as Beaubourg (IPA: [bobuʁ])

=== Indoors ===
Centre Pompidou houses three major institutions:

- Bibliothèque publique d'information (Bpi; Public Information Library), a vast public library
- Musée National d'Art Moderne, the largest museum for modern and contemporary art in Europe
- IRCAM, a centre for music and acoustic research

The BPI holds around 367,000 books, as well as specialist periodicals, audio-visual materials, photographs, and a wealth of other material. The collections are open to the public, but it is not a lending library. It also hosts cultural events and screens documentary films, as well as hosting the Cinéma du Réel documentary film festival.

During the major renovation of the Centre Pompidou from March 2025 until 2030, the BPI will be temporarily relocated to its Lumière building at 40 Avenue des Terroirs de France on 25 August 2025.

=== Outdoors ===
The sculpture Horizontal by Alexander Calder, a 7 m (23 ft) tall free-standing mobile, was displayed in front of the Centre Pompidou from 2011 to 2017.

==== Stravinsky Fountain ====
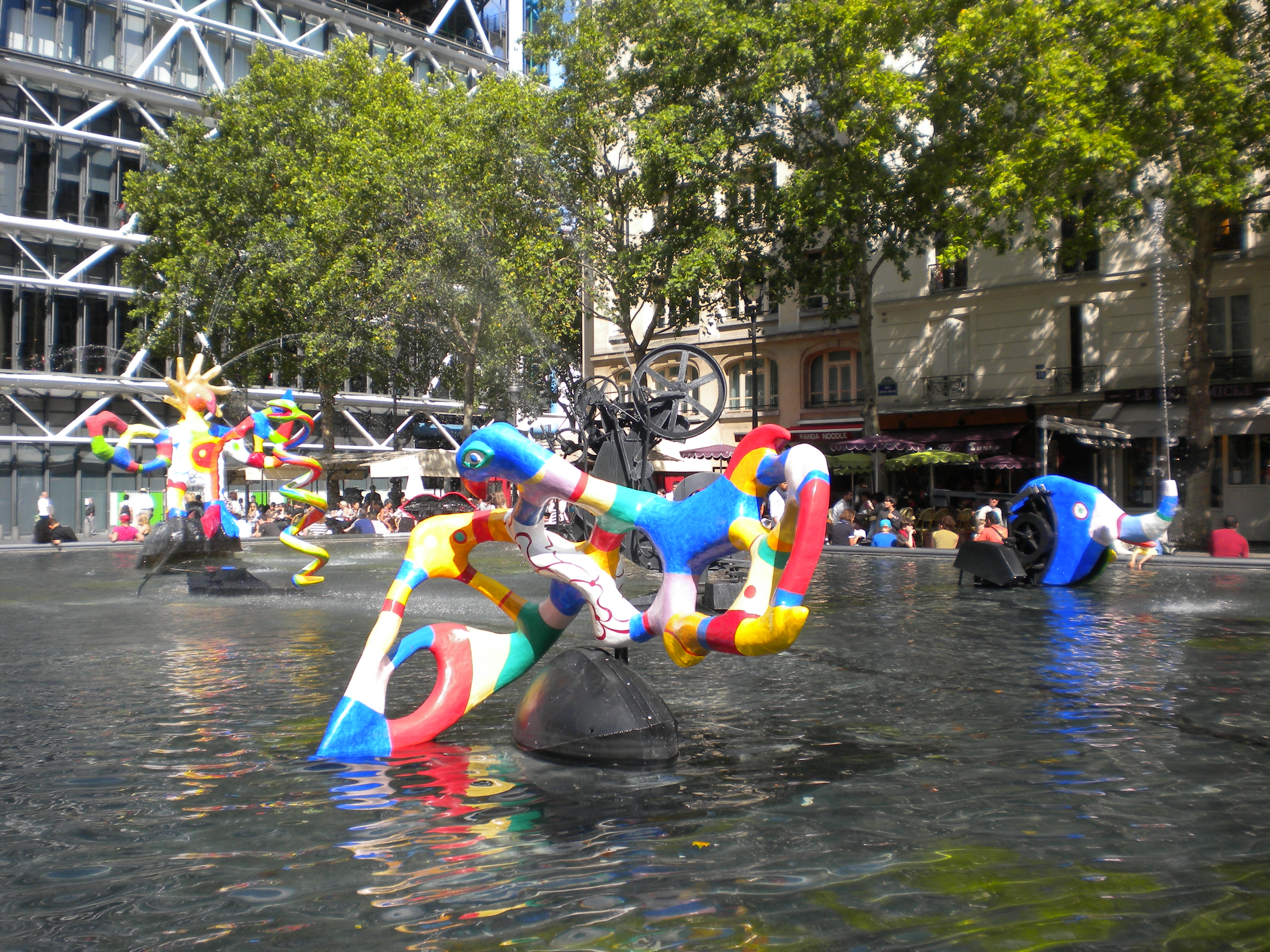
The Stravinsky Fountain located outside the Centre Pompidou

The nearby Stravinsky Fountain (also called the Fontaine des automates), on Place Stravinsky, features 16 whimsical moving and water-spraying sculptures by Jean Tinguely and Niki de Saint-Phalle, which represent themes and works by composer Igor Stravinsky. The black-painted mechanical sculptures are by Tinguely, the coloured works by de Saint-Phalle. The fountain opened in 1983.

==== Place Georges Pompidou ====
The Place Georges Pompidou in front of the museum is noted for the presence of street performers, such as mimes and jugglers. In the spring, miniature carnivals are installed temporarily into the place in front with a wide variety of attractions: bands, caricature and sketch artists, tables set up for evening dining, and even skateboarding competitions.

In 2021, the artists Arotin & Serghei realised for the re-inauguration of the Place Georges Pompidou after years of works, and in the context of IRCAM's festival Manifeste the intermedial large-scale installation Infinite Light Columns / Constellations of The Future 1–4, Tribute to Constantin Brâncuși, installed along Piano's IRCAM Tower, on the opposite site of Brâncuși's studio, visible from both, the Place Igor Stravinsky and Place Georges Pompidou. Then president of the Centre Pompidou, Serge Lasvignes, said in his 2015 inauguration speech: "The installation symbolises what the Centre Pompidou wants to be... a multidisciplinary ensemble... it is the resurrection of the initial spirit of the Centre Pompidou with the Piazza, the living heart of creation".

== Attendance ==
By the mid-1980s, the Centre Pompidou was becoming the victim of its huge and unexpected popularity, its many activities, and a complex administrative structure. When Dominique Bozo returned to the Centre in 1981 as Director of the Musée National d'Art Moderne, he re-installed the museum, bringing out the full range of its collections and displaying the many major acquisitions that had been made.

By 1992, the Centre de Création Industrielle was incorporated into the Musée National d'Art Moderne, henceforth called "MNAM/CCI". The CCI, as an organisation with its own design-oriented programme, ceased to exist, while the MNAM started to develop a design and architecture collection in addition to its modern and contemporary art collection.

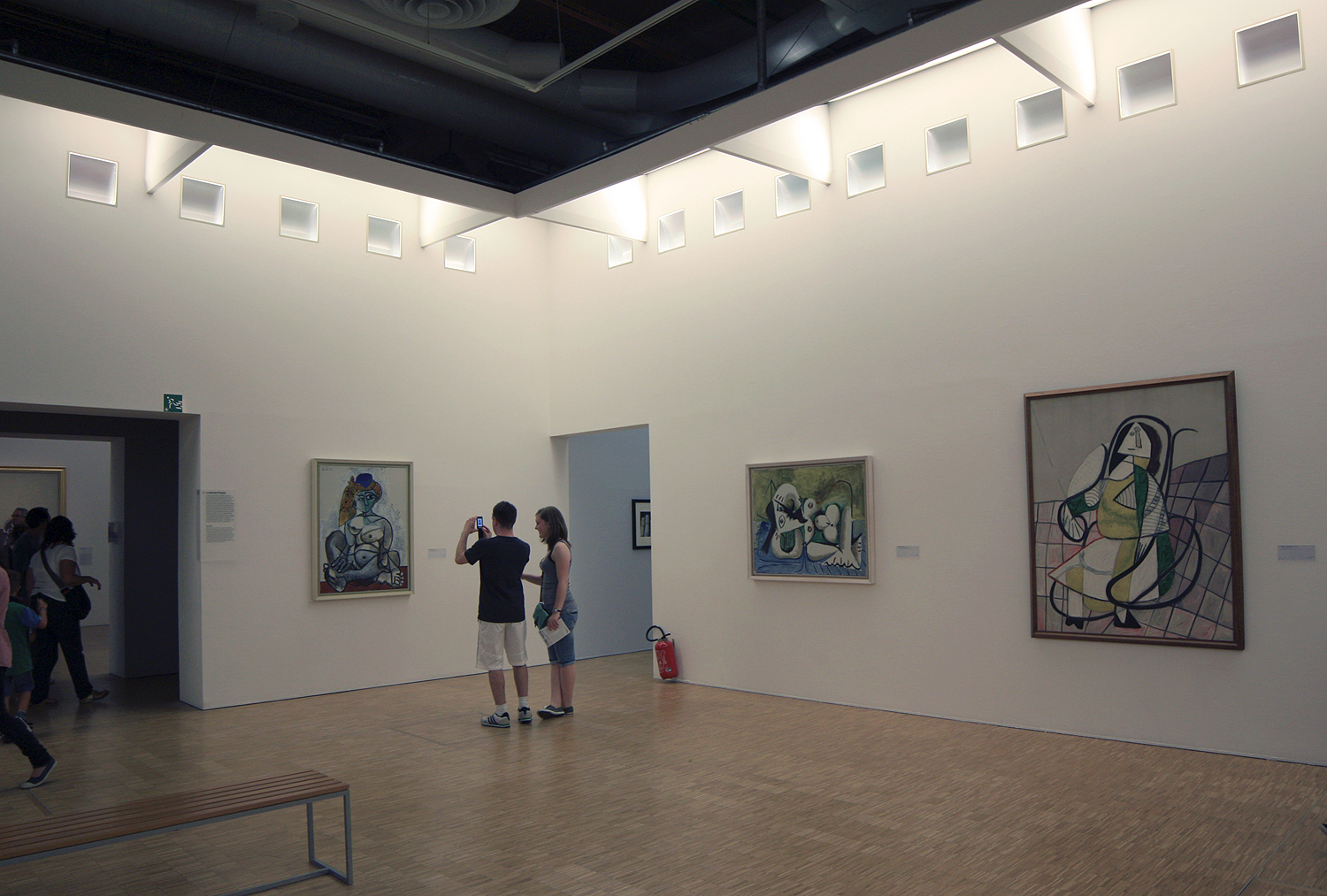
Pablo Picasso's works in the Centre

The Centre Pompidou was intended to handle 8,000 visitors a day. In its first two decades it attracted more than 145 million visitors, more than five times the number first predicted. As of 2006, more than 180 million people have visited the centre since its opening in 1977. However, until the 1997–2000 renovation, 20 percent of the centre's eight million annual visitors—predominantly foreign tourists—rode the escalators up the outside of the building to the platform for the sights.

During a three-year renovation ending in its 2000 reopening, the Centre Pompidou improved accessibility for visitors

Between 1977 and 2006, the centre had 180 million visitors. Since 2006, the global attendance of the centre is no longer calculated at the main entrance, but only those of the Musée National d'Art Moderne and of the public library (5,209,678 visitors for both in 2013), but without the other visitors of the building (929,431 in 2004 or 928,380 in 2006, for only the panorama tickets or cinemas, festivals, lectures, bookshops, workshops, restaurants, etc.). In 2017, the museum had 3.37 million visitors. The public library had 1.37 million.

The Musée National d'Art Moderne saw an increase in attendance from 3.1 million (2010) to 3.6 million visitors in 2011, and 3.75 million in 2013. The 2013 retrospective Dalí broke the museum's daily attendance record: 7,364 people a day went to see the artist's work (790,000 in total).

Visitors to the centre totalled more than 5,209,678 in 2013, (Note: Since 2006, the calculated attendance of the centre includes only those of the Musée National d'Art Moderne and of the public library but no longer those of the panorama tickets or cinemas, festivals, lectures, bookshops, workshops, restaurants, etc: 929,431 visitors in 2004 or 928,380 in 2006, which should bring the actual total attendance of the centre to more than 6 million.) including 3,746,899 for the museum.

The centre had 3.1 million visitors in 2022, a large increase from 2021 but still below 2019 levels, due to closures caused by the COVID-19 pandemic in France.

== Expansion ==
=== Regional branches ===
The Centre Pompidou-Metz

In 2010, the Centre Georges Pompidou opened a regional branch, the Centre Pompidou-Metz, in Metz, a city 250 kilometres east of Paris. The new museum is part of an effort to expand the display of contemporary arts beyond Paris's large museums. The new museum's building was designed by the architect Shigeru Ban with a curving and asymmetrical pagoda-like roof topped by a spire and punctured by upper galleries. The 77-metre central spire is a nod to the year the Centre Georges Pompidou of Paris was built – 1977. The Centre Pompidou-Metz displays unique, temporary exhibitions from the collection of the Musée National d'Art Moderne, which is not on display at the main Parisian museum. Since its inauguration, the institution has become the most visited cultural venue in France outside Paris, accommodating 550,000 visitors/year.

Launched in 2011 in Chaumont, the museum for the first time went on the road to the French regions with a selection of works from the permanent collection. To do this, it designed and constructed a mobile gallery, which, in the spirit of a circus, will make camp for a few months at a time in towns throughout the country. However, in 2013, the Centre Pompidou halted its mobile-museum project because of the cost.

In 2014, plans were released for a temporary satellite of the Centre Pompidou in the northern French town of Maubeuge close to the Belgian border. The 3,000-square-metre outpost, to be designed by the architects Pierre Hebbelinck and Pierre de Wit, is said to be located at the 17th-century Maubeuge Arsenal for four years. The cost of the project is €5.8 million.

In 2015, the city authorities in Libourne, a town in south-western France, proposed a Pompidou branch housed in a former military base called Esog.

In 2019, the Centre Pompidou announced plans to open a 22,000 m^{2} (240,000 sq ft) conservation, exhibition and storage space in Massy (Essonne) by 2025. Project backers include the Région Ile-de-France and the French state.

=== International expansion ===
==== Europe ====
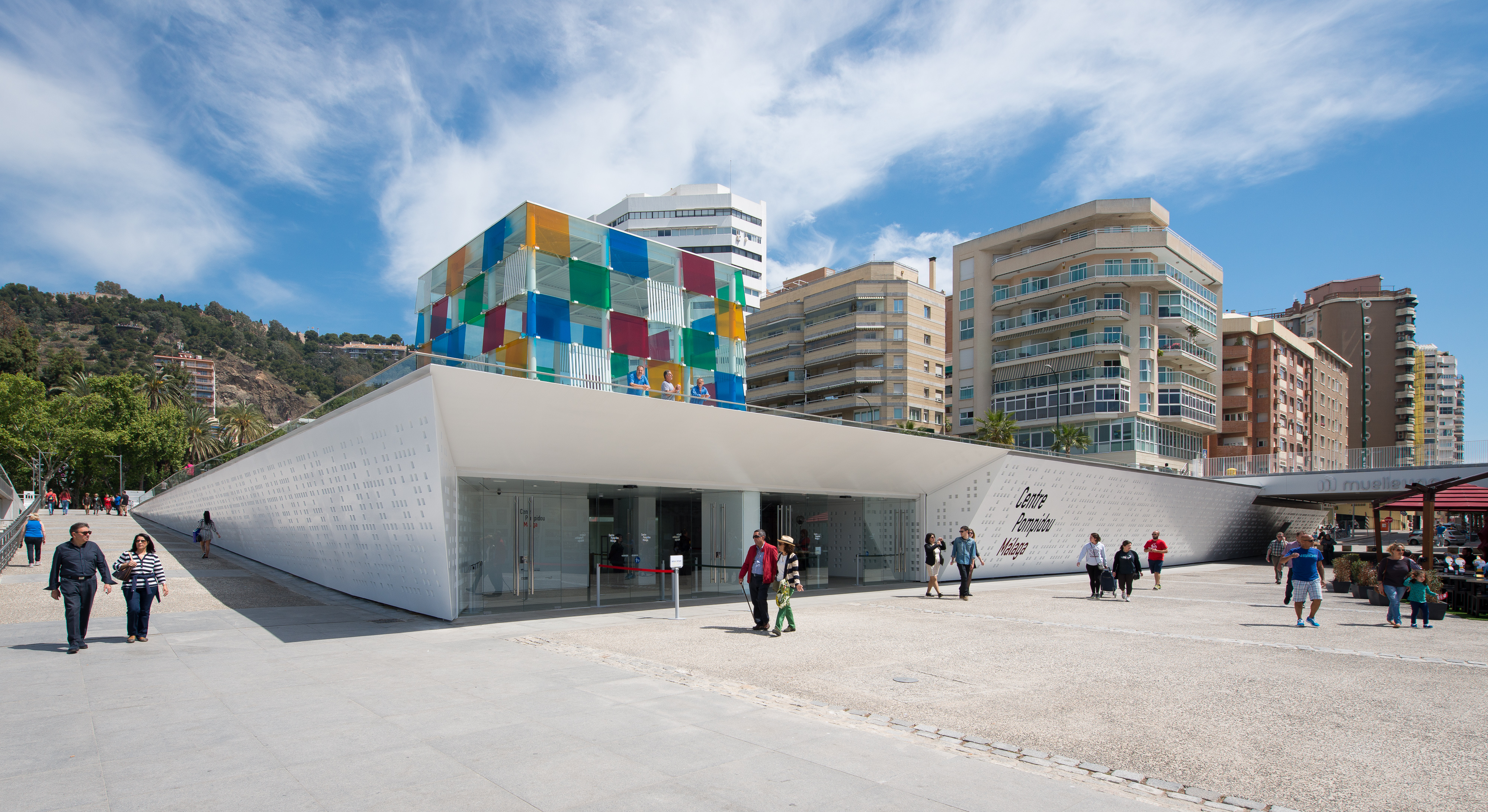
Branch in Málaga (Spain)

===== Málaga =====
In 2015, approximately 70 works from the Centre Pompidou's collection went on show in a 2,000 square metres (22,000 square feet) subterranean glass-and-steel structure called The Cube (El Cubo) in Málaga. According to the Spanish newspaper El País, the annual €1 million cost of the five-year project were funded by the city council. The partnership with Málaga was announced by the city's mayor but was not confirmed by Pompidou Centre president Alain Seban until 24 April 2014.

Under the agreement, approximately 100 works from the Pompidou's 20th and 21st century collection were put on display, while a smaller area is being used for temporary exhibitions. Portraiture and the influence of Picasso will be among the subjects explored in the permanent display, organised by the Pompidou's deputy director Brigitte Leal. Highlights will include works by Alberto Giacometti, René Magritte, Alexander Calder and Constantin Brâncuși, and contemporary works by Sophie Calle, Bruce Nauman and Orlan. The city of Málaga also commissioned Daniel Buren to create a large-scale installation within El Cubo.

Following the original five-year agreement that was signed in September 2014, the terms were renewed early 2018 and again in 2024. Under the most recent renewal, Málaga city council agreed to pay the Centre Pompidou an annual fee of €2.7 million over five years (2025–29), rising to €3.1 million in the latter period (2030–34).

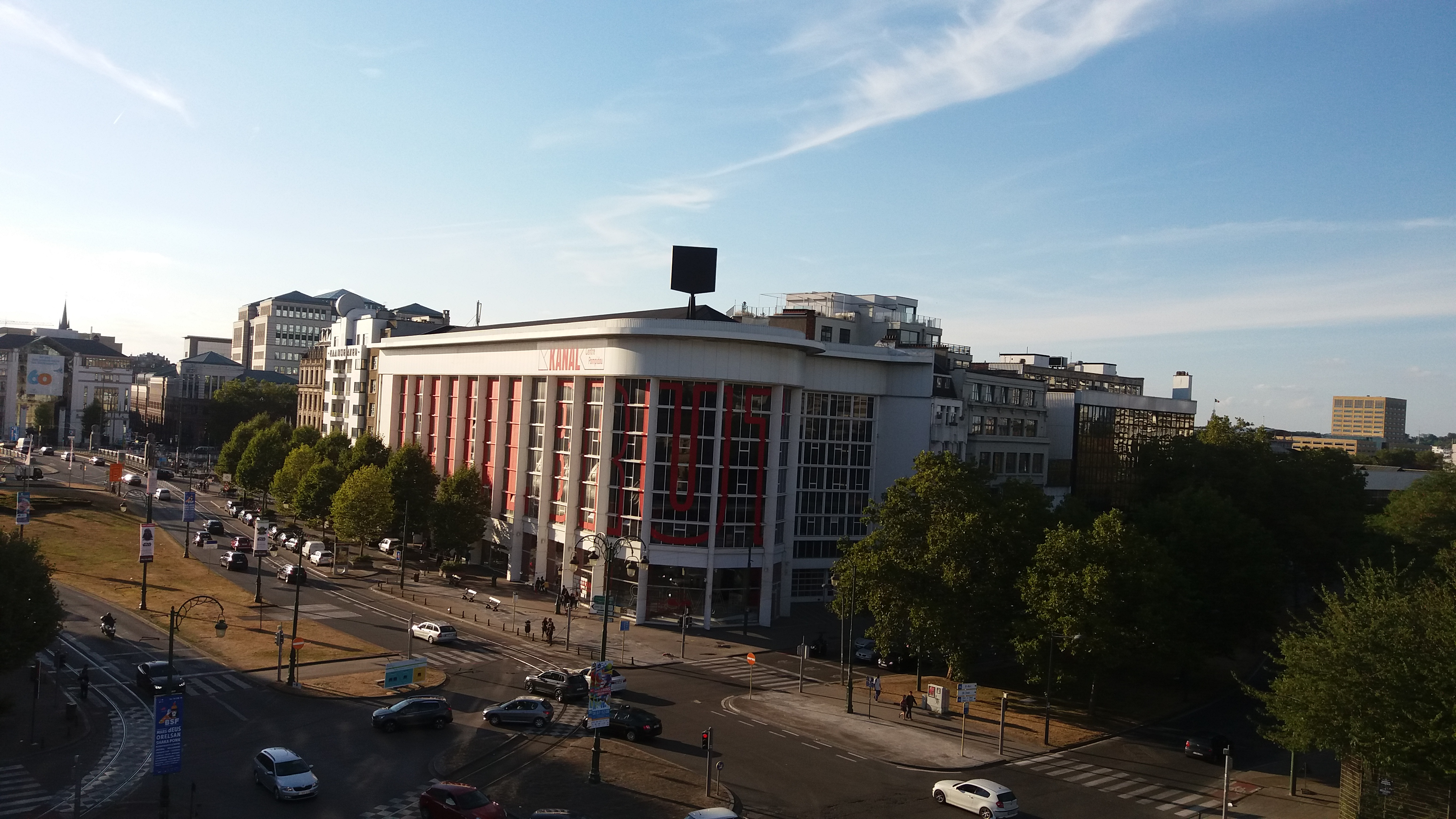
KANAL - Centre Pompidou in Brussels

===== Brussels =====
In March 2018, the Centre Pompidou announced plans to open an offshoot branch in Brussels, under the name KANAL - Centre Pompidou. Housed in a former Citroën garage which was transformed by a team comprising ces noAarchitecten (Brussels), EM2N (Zurich) and Sergison Bates architects (London), the new centre brings together the 12,200 sq ft (1,130 m^{2}) Museum of Modern and Contemporary Art, an architecture centre (CIVA Foundation) and public spaces devoted to culture, education and leisure. The Brussels-Capital region — which acquired the 16,000 sq ft (1,500 m^{2}) Art Deco-style building in October 2015 — is the main funder project, with the conversion costing €122 million.

==== Asia ====
In a joint proposal with the Solomon R. Guggenheim Museum presented in 2005, the Centre Pompidou planned to build a museum of modern and contemporary art, design and the media arts in Hong Kong's West Kowloon Cultural District.

In 2007, the then president Bruno Racine announced plans to open a museum carrying the Pompidou's name in Shanghai, with its programming to be determined by the Pompidou. The location chosen for the new museum was a former fire station in the Luwan district's Huaihai Park. However, the scheme did not materialize for several years, reportedly due to the lack of a legal framework for a non-profit foreign institution to operate in China. In 2019, the Centre Pompidou x West Bund Museum opened to the public, based in a wing of the 25,000 sq ft (2,300 m^{2}) West Bund Art Museum designed by David Chipperfield. The inaugural exhibitions The Shape of Time, Highlights of the Centre Pompidou Collection and Observations, Highlights of the New Media Collection were curated by Marcella Lista.

Other projects include the Pompidou's joint venture with the King Abdulaziz Centre for World Culture, an arts complex incorporating a museum in Dhahran, the building of which has stalled.

In 2023, the Hanwha Foundation of Culture signed a memorandum of understanding with the Centre Pompidou in Paris to open an art museum in Seoul by the end of 2025. In April 2026, it was announced that the Centre Pompidou Hanwha will open on 4 June 2026 with the inaugural exhibition The Cubists: Inventing Modern Vision. Centre Pompidou Hanwha will be housed in Tower 63, the headquarters of the Hanwha Group; during the first four years the museum will present two exhibitions annually drawing on the Centre Pompidou’s collection and presented with exhibitions “highlighting contemporary Korean artists and the major trends currently shaping the international art scene.”

In 2026, the Centre Pompidou and M+ announced a five-year strategic partnership. Under the agreement, the Pompidou will reopen its renovated building with an exhibition drawn from both museums’ collections, which will subsequently be presented at M+.

==== North America ====
In April 2014, Pompidou president Alain Seban confirmed that after Málaga (Spain), Mexico will be the next site for a pop-up Pompidou Centre. A 58,000-square-foot (5390 m^{2}) satellite museum Centre Pompidou x Jersey City in Jersey City, New Jersey, was scheduled to open in 2024, which would have made it the Pompidou's first satellite museum in North America; however, in 2024, city and state funding for the museum was withdrawn. The Jersey City City Council voted in September 2024 to approve a tax abatement, allowing Centre Pompidou x Jersey City to open at the approved Artwalk Towers development. In February 2026, the Mayor of Jersey City announced that the project would not happen.

==== South America ====
There have been rumours of a pop-up Pompidou satellite museum in Brazil since Alain Seban announced the plan for these temporary locations back in 2012. At a talk on satellite museums at the Guggenheim on 24 April 2014, Alain Seban suggested that Brazil may be the third country to host a temporary satellite museum, after Spain and Mexico.

== Management ==
=== Presidents ===
- 2021 – present: Laurent Le Bon
- 2015 – 2021: Serge Lasvignes
- 2007 – 2015: Alain Seban
- 2002 – 2007: Bruno Racine
- 1996 – 2002: Jean-Jacques Aillagon
- 1993 – 1996: François Barré
- 1991 – 1993: Dominique Bozo
- 1989 – 1991: Hélène Ahrweiler
- 1983 – 1989: Jean Maheu
- 1980 – 1983: Jean-Claude Groshens
- 1977 – 1980: Jean Millier
- 1976 – 1977: Robert Bordaz
- 1969 – 1977: Georges Pompidou

=== Funding ===
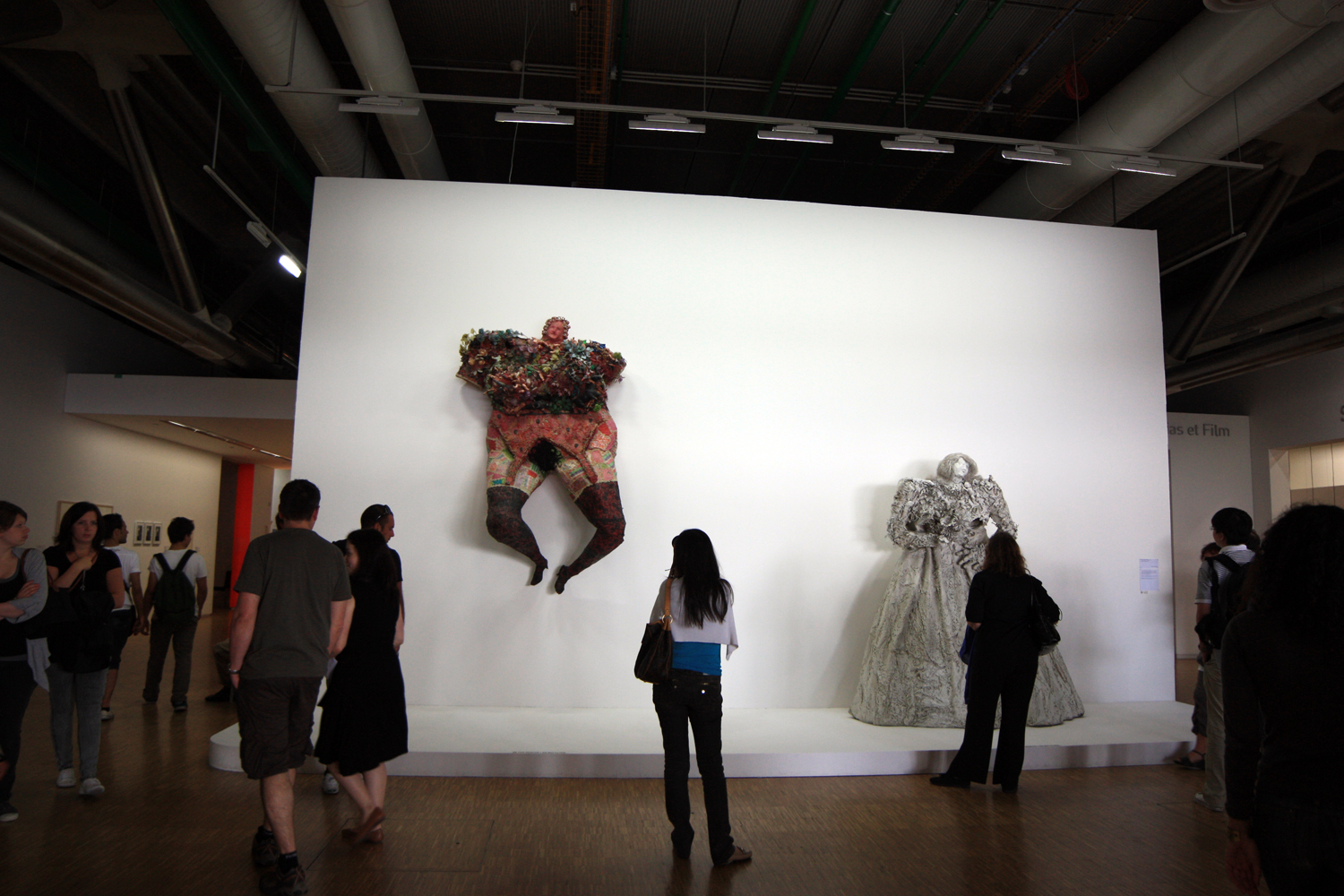
Part of the expositions in the Centre

As a national museum, the Centre Pompidou is government-owned and subsidised by the Ministry of Culture (64.2% of its budget in 2012 : 82.8 on 129 million €), essentially for its staff. The Culture Ministry appoints its directors and controls its gestion, which is nevertheless independent, as Etablissement public à caractère administratif since its creation. In 2011, the museum earned $1.9 million from travelling exhibitions.

Established in 1977 as the institution's US philanthropic arm, the Georges Pompidou Art and Culture Foundation acquires and encourages major gifts of art and design for exhibition at the museum. Since 2006, the non-profit support group has brought in donations of 28 works, collectively valued at more than $14 million, and purchased many others. In 2013, New York-based art collectors Thea Westreich Wagner and Ethan Wagner announced their intention to donate about 300 works by 27 European and international artists to the Centre Pompidou, thereby making one of the largest gifts in the institution's history.

=== Nazi-looted art ===
In 1999, the heirs of Alphonse Kann requested the return of Georges Braque's The Guitar Player, which the Centre Pompidou had acquired from Heinz Berggruen in 1981.

In 2011, Centre Pompidou admitted that it held three paintings, Les Peupliers (Poplars), Arbres (Trees), and Composition by the artist Fédor Löwenstein that had been looted during the Nazi occupation of France.

In 2021, after the French government restituted a looted Max Pechtstein painting to the heirs of Hugo Simon, the Centre Pompidou held an exhibition in a tribute to the persecuted art collector.

== In popular culture ==
=== Film and TV ===
- Gordon Matta-Clark Conical Intersect, 1975. Matta-Clark's contribution to the Paris Biennale 1975.
- Roberto Rossellini, Beaubourg, centre d'art et de culture, 1977. A documentary about the Centre which explores the building and its surroundings on its opening day; Rossellini's final film.
- Lewis Gilbert, Moonraker, 1979. A fifth-floor room of the building featured as the office of Holly Goodhead (played by Lois Chiles), in the 1979 James Bond film Moonraker, which in the film was scripted as being part of the space complex of the villainous Hugo Drax (Michael Lonsdale).
- Claude Pinoteau, L'Étudiante, 1988.
- Richard Berry, L'Art (délicat) de la séduction, 2001.
- James Ivory, Le Divorce, 2003.
- Laurent Tirard, Mensonges et trahisons, 2004.
- Éric et Ramzy, Seuls Two, 2008.

=== Other ===
- In the 1986 music video for "Calling America," Electric Light Orchestra is shown performing the song in front of the centre.
- The cover of the 1979 album Euroman Cometh by JJ Burnel shows Burnel standing in front of the centre.
- The comedy podcast Three Bean Salad has a recurring segment, in which the hosts discuss the behind-the-scenes operations of the podcast, named the "Pompidou Section" (complete with its own jingle) in reference to the external pipework and elevators of Centre Pompidou.

== Public transport ==
- Nearby Métro stations: Rambuteau, Les Halles
- RER: Châtelet – Les Halles

== Exhibitions ==
Several major exhibitions are organised each year on either the first or sixth floors, including both monographs and group exhibitions.

Exhibitions have included:

- Totem and tattoo by Olivier Vadrot (2017)
- Photography as a weapon of class (2018)
- Coder le monde (2018)
- La Fabrique Du Vivant (2019)
- Jo-Ey Tang & Thomas Fougeirol – Dust. The Plates Of The Present (2020 Group Exhibition)
- Les Moyens Du Bord (2020)
- Global(e) Resistance – Pour une histoire engagée de la collection contemporaine de Jonathas de Andrade à Billie Zangewa (2020)
- NEURONS Simulated intelligence (2020)
- L'écologie des images (2021)

== See also ==
- List of museums in Paris
- List of tourist attractions in Paris
