= Liz Deschenes =

American visual artist (born 1966)

- Born: 1966 (age 59–60); Boston, Massachusetts, U.S.
- Education: Rhode Island School of Design
- Known for: sculptor, photography, educator
- Movement: Minimalism, Post-conceptual art

Liz Deschenes (born 1966) is an American contemporary artist and educator. Her work is situated between sculpture and image and engages with post-conceptual photography and Minimalism. Her work examines the fluidity of the medium of photography and expands on what constitutes the viewing of a photograph. Deschenes has stated that she seeks to "enable the viewer to see the inconstancy of the conditions of display, which are always at play but sometimes hard to see." Her practice is not bound to a single technology, method, process, or subject, but to the fundamental elements of photography, such as light, paper, chemistry, and time.

She has taught at Bennington College and was a visiting artist at Columbia University's School of Visual Arts and Yale University. In 2019, she was the Wolf Chair in Photography at Cooper Union. She currently teaches at the School of Visual Arts, New York, and is a visiting artist at Columbia University. She lives and works in New York City.

== Early life and education ==
Deschenes was born in 1966 in Boston, Massachusetts, and grew up on the South Shore, a largely homogeneous and conservative town. As a child, she frequently encountered and was fascinated by the Boston Gas Tank (Rainbow Tank) by artist and activist Corita Kent, situated prominently on the waterfront of Dorchester.

In the mid-1980s, Deschenes enrolled at the Rhode Island School of Design (RISD), intending to study painting or architecture but eventually changing her focus to photography. The pedagogical style of RISD at the time was very conservative and there were few female faculty members in the photography department. As a result, Deschenes sought other contexts for involvement with feminism, queer politics, AIDS activism, examining the power of representation within the medium of photography. Deschenes graduated from RISD in 1988 with a BFA degree in photography.

Deschenes worked in photography labs as a technician throughout her career as a young artist, becoming adept at chemical and analogue printing processes. In this capacity, she also worked extensively documenting the artwork of others, which influenced her notion of mediation and the conditions of production and display. In 1997, Deschenes presented Elevation #1-#7 (1997), a set of seven monochrome dye transfer prints whose colors correspond to those developed by cartographers to represent the range of earth's elevation. In the work, by utilizing the process of dye color transfer color printing, which was discontinued by Kodak in 1994, Deschenes investigates the technological changes in the medium. In 2001, influenced by her visit to the National Association of Broadcasters' convention in Las Vegas, Deschenes created her series Blue and Green Screens (2001-2002), which foregrounded the invisible backdrops used for special effects in film production.

== Work ==
Deschenes explores the materials and properties of photography, light, and perception, often in relation to the architectural environments within which they are displayed. Curator and critic Matthew Witkovsky has written that Deschenes' work "pushes against the basic terms by which photography is conventionally defined: instantaneity, veracity, fixity, or reproducibility." At the same time, Deschenes engages with the legacy of Minimalism, drawing attention to the techniques of the observer by deploying old photographic methods and techniques such as the photogram and the daguerreotype. Deschenes "calibrates her works to the site" in order to reveal the spectator's relationship to the space, whether by encouraging new visual encounters or responding to and disrupting the architectural space.

=== Major works ===
In 2007, Deschenes presented her series of photographs titled Moiré (2007) at Miguel Abreu Gallery's "Registration" exhibition. For the work, Deschenes photographed a sheet of perforated paper filtering the light coming through the window, and layered the negative with a duplicate in an enlarger to create an abstract image with illusions of movement. Moirés were paired with Red Transfer (1997), a diptych of monochromatic dye transfer prints with subtle differences in hue. The dye transfers' matrices alignment served as a counterpoint to the misregistration in the Moirés series. In an interview with Mousse Magazine in 2014, Deschenes noted that the Moires series sought to "confound" the limitations of making something "with a property largely outside of the confines of photography and expectations that are brought to looking at a photographic work."

Two years later, in 2009, Deschenes created Tilt / Swing (2009), an installation of six "silver mirror" panels arranged in a 360-degree floor-to-ceiling configuration. It was based on an unrealized exhibition design conceived by Herbert Bayer, a Bauhaus artist and architect, in The Fundamentals of Exhibition Design. While Bayer's schema sought to be "an inclusive picture of all [viewpoint] possibilities," Deschenes' installation resulted in a fragmentation of the surrounding environment. Commenting on the title of the work, Matthew Witkovsky has written that the words tilt and swing evoke "abstract issues of viewpoint and manipulation, for example the ways in which the spectatorial subject is turned or focused in the controlled setting of a museum building." At the same time, curator Eva Respini has remarked that in addition to the reference to Bayer, it is crucial to consider the influence of Conceptual and Performance Art in Tilt / Swing, as the work requires a physical "activation by the viewer."

In her 2012-2013 exhibition at the Secession in Vienna, Deschenes staged a new series of photograms, Stereographs 1-16 (2012). In the installation, Deschenes mimicked the illusion of spatiality in the stereoscopes by converting the gallery into a camera. Deschenes moved the gallery's entrance to a previously unused exterior side door, leading the viewers through a long hallway (the viewfinder) to two adjacent rooms (the stereograph). Each room contained four Stereographs of the same size. Johanna Burton stated that the Stereographs "must be seen not only as dilating context and insisting on spatial occupation but also as moving speculatively: developing."

In 2014, at the invitation of the Walker Art Center in Minneapolis, Deschenes created Gallery 7 (2014), a site-specific installation composed of three elements: eleven photographs in freestanding frames; three horizontal lines etched into the gallery walls; and the natural light from the floor-to-ceiling windows. The freestanding frames were located in the center of the space, relocating the viewing experience from the walls towards the windows. The exhibition was on view for a year, throughout which the light conditions changed and encouraged the oxidation of the light-sensitive photograms. The proportions of the photographs, furthermore, were based on those of an index card, in reference to Lucy Lippard's c. 7,500 exhibition of Conceptual art by women artists at the Walker Art Center in 1973. In 2014, Deschenes was a recipient of the prestigious Rappaport Art Prize. Established in 2000, the Rappaport Prize is an annual art award presented to a contemporary artist with strong connections to New England by deCordova Sculpture Park and Museum through the support of the Phyllis and Jerome Lyle Rappaport Foundation.

In 2018, Deschenes staged her Rates (Frames per Second) exhibition at Miguel Abreu Gallery. In the installation, Deschenes took the proto-cinematic experiments of Étienne-Jules Marey as the point of departure and presented two series, FPS (Frames per Second) and FPF (Frames per Feet). FPS was cut and mounted directly on vertical strips of dibond, and FPF was pressed in thin, horizontal frames. Both series progressed with the rhythm of the viewer's footsteps, akin to the body's movement being captured by the camera in time. The Brooklyn Rail described the show as centering on not "the specific atmospheric or environmental conditions that produced each print," but "how time is felt...and the specific weight that time can hold in space."

== Exhibitions ==
Deschenes has exhibited extensively in the United States and abroad, including solo shows at ICA/Boston (2016), MASS MoCA in North Adams, MA (2015), Walker Art Center in Minneapolis (2015), Campoli Presti in Paris and London (2013), Secession, Vienna (2012), Sutton Lane, Brussels (2010), and Miguel Abreu Gallery in New York (2009). Her first solo presentation at an American museum, "Liz Deschenes: Gallery 7" was on view at the Walker Art Center from November 2014 to October 2015 and curated by Eric Crosby.

Deschenes' work has been included in numerous group exhibitions at the Whitney Museum of American Art, Musee d'Art Moderne, the Centre Pompidou, and Extra City Kunsthal in Antwerp. Her work was also featured in "Sites of Reason: A Selection of Recent Acquisitions" at the Museum of Modern Art (2014), "What is a Photograph?" at the International Center of Photography in New York (2014), and "Cross Over. Photography of Science + Science of Photography" at Fotomuseum Winterthur, Switzerland (2013). Deschenes was also featured in the 2012 Whitney Biennial and "Parcours" (2012), a two-person exhibition at The Art Institute of Chicago that she co-curated with Florian Pumhösl and Matthew Witkovsky.

Recent monographs dedicated to Deschenes' work includes Liz Deschenes (Boston: The Institute of Contemporary Art, 2016) and Liz Deschenes, Secession (Vienna: Secession, Berlin: Revolver, 2012).

== Collections ==
Deschenes' work is in the collections of the Centre Pompidou in France, the San Francisco Museum of Modern Art, the Museum of Modern Art, The Metropolitan Museum of Art, the Whitney Museum of American Art, and the Solomon R. Guggenheim Museum in New York, as well as The Art Institute of Chicago, the Walker Art Center in Minneapolis, the ICA/Boston, the CCS Bard Hessel Museum of Art, the Milwaukee Art Museum, and the Corcoran Museum of Art and the Hirschhorn Museum and Sculpture Garden in Washington, D.C.

The Institute of Contemporary Art, Boston showed the first comprehensive survey of her work in 2016.
