= Carolina Bescansa =

Spanish politician and political scientist

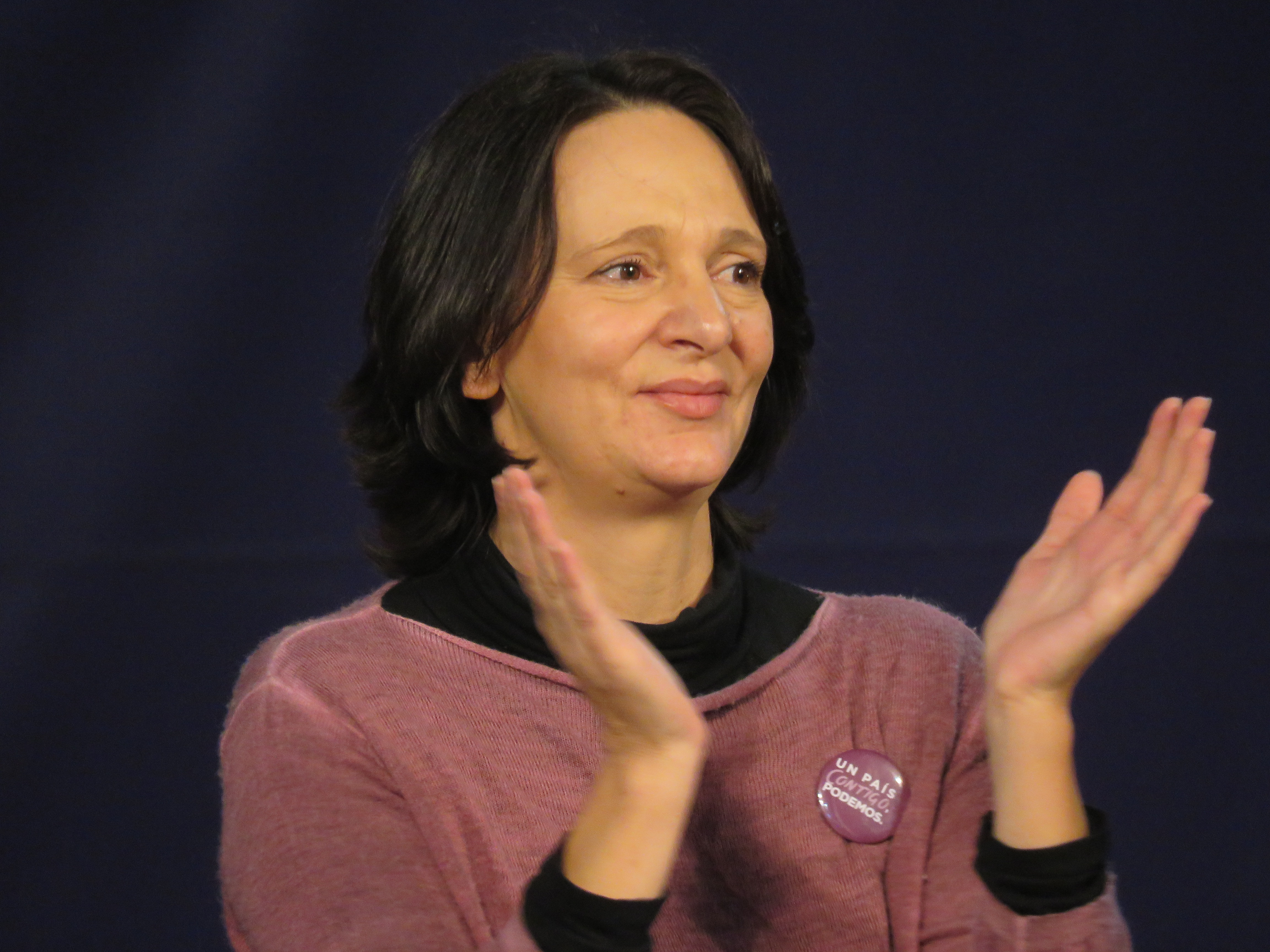

Member of the Spanish Congress of Deputies
- In office 13 January 2016 – 5 March 2019
- Constituency: Madrid

Personal details
- Born: Carolina Bescansa Hernández; 13 February 1971 (age 55) Santiago de Compostela, Spain
- Party: Más País (2019–2023); Podemos (2014–2019)
- Children: 2
- Occupation: Politician; Political scientist

Carolina Bescansa is a Spanish politician and political scientist who co-founded the political party Podemos. She was a representative for Madrid in the Spanish Congress of Deputies from 2016 to 2019.

== Academic work ==
Bescansa is from Santiago de Compostela. She studied Sociology and Political Science in Grenada and Madrid, focusing specifically on political sociology and the study of constitutional law. After graduating in 1994, she did a specialist degree in constitutional law at the Centre for Political and Constitutional Studies. She then became a doctoral student at the Complutense University of Madrid, and in the 1999–2000 school year she participated in an Education Abroad Program at the University of California, San Diego.

In 1995, she began to teach political science classes at the Complutense University of Madrid, where she became a member of the political science faculty specializing in the methodology of political science research.

== Political career ==
Bescansa was a co-founder of the political party Podemos, officially registering it as a political party on 11 March 2014 together with Pablo Iglesias Turrión and Juan Carlos Monedero.

In 2014, Bescansa was not on the party list of Podemos, but that year she was elected to the Citizens' Council of the party with about 85% of the votes. This made her the most powerful woman and one of the three most powerful people in the party organization. Bescansa also used her expertise as a political science methodologist in her partisan work, heading the party's political analysis unit and analysing its surveys.

In the 2015 Spanish general election, Bescansa was ranked second on the Podemos party list to the Congress of Deputies for the Madrid constituency, and she won the seat. She launched a candidacy for President of the Congress of Deputies, but lost the race to Patxi López.

In 2017, Bescansa publicly split with the leadership of Podemos, and left her positions within the party. She was subsequently affiliated with a coalition of Más País and Equo.
