= Leadership opinion polling for the 2015 Spanish general election =

In the run up to the 2015 Spanish general election, various organisations carried out opinion polling to gauge the opinions that voters held towards political leaders. The results of such polls are displayed in this article. The date range for these opinion polls is from the previous general election, held on 20 November 2011, to the day the next election was held, on 20 December 2015.

== Preferred prime minister ==
The table below lists opinion polling on leader preferences to become prime minister.

=== All candidates ===
Polling firm/Commissioner	Fieldwork date	Sample size							Other/ None/ Not care	Question	Lead
Polling firm/Commissioner	Fieldwork date	Sample size	Rajoy PP	Sánchez PSOE	Garzón IU	Díez UPyD	Rivera C's	Iglesias Podemos	Other/ None/ Not care	Question	Lead
NC Report/La Razón	9–12 Dec 2015	3,000	21.2	17.4	–	–	11.7	8.4	10.3	31.0	3.8
InvyMark/laSexta	7–11 Dec 2015	?	23.9	21.8	–	–	20.7	21.9	–	11.7	2.0
Metroscopia/El País	7–10 Dec 2015	2,800	21.0	18.0	–	–	16.0	18.0	27.0		3.0
GESOP/El Periódico	23–28 Nov 2015	1,816	19.6	19.6	6.7	–	19.3	14.5	11.8	8.5	Tie
Metroscopia/El País	26–28 Oct 2015	1,400	17.0	16.0	–	–	22.0	14.0	8.0	23.0	5.0
InvyMark/laSexta	22–26 Jun 2015	1,200	20.3	31.1	–	–	12.2	20.1	3.9	12.4	10.8
GESOP/El Periódico	8–13 Apr 2015	1,000	15.3	15.8	5.0	1.5	16.0	19.4	19.1	7.9	3.4
InvyMark/laSexta	2–6 Feb 2015	1,200	25.9	26.0	–	–	–	31.2	–	16.9	5.2
MyWord/Cadena SER	30 Dec–6 Jan 2015	1,001	23.4	32.2	–	–	–	44.4	–	–	12.2
InvyMark/laSexta	15–19 Dec 2014	1,200	19.3	29.1	–	–	–	31.0	–	20.6	1.9
GESOP/El Periódico	9–15 Dec 2014	1,000	15.9	13.4	4.0	5.4	3.9	25.1	20.7	11.6	9.2
InvyMark/laSexta	27–31 Oct 2014	?	13.7	24.8	–	–	–	34.1	–	27.4	9.3

=== Rajoy vs. Rubalcaba ===
Polling firm/Commissioner	Fieldwork date	Sample size			Other/ None/ Not care	Question	Lead
Polling firm/Commissioner	Fieldwork date	Sample size	Rajoy PP	Rubalcaba PSOE	Other/ None/ Not care	Question	Lead
GESOP/El Periódico	20–23 Jan 2014	1,000	24.0	31.3	42.1	2.6	7.3
GESOP/El Periódico	25–28 Nov 2013	1,000	23.0	29.7	45.2	2.1	6.7
Feedback/La Vanguardia	2–6 Sep 2013	1,500	26.4	35.1	37.7	0.8	8.7
GESOP/El Periódico	25–28 Jun 2013	1,000	22.7	30.4	43.9	3.0	7.7
GESOP/El Periódico	25–29 Jan 2013	1,000	21.6	32.7	42.3	3.4	11.1
GESOP/El Periódico	14–18 Jun 2012	1,000	30.9	36.0	30.5	2.6	5.1
GESOP/El Periódico	23–28 Feb 2012	1,000	39.0	33.5	24.6	2.9	5.5

== Predicted prime minister ==
The table below lists opinion polling on the perceived likelihood for each leader to become prime minister.

Polling firm/Commissioner	Fieldwork date	Sample size					Other/ None/ Not care	Question	Lead
Polling firm/Commissioner	Fieldwork date	Sample size	Rajoy PP	Sánchez PSOE	Rivera C's	Iglesias Podemos	Other/ None/ Not care	Question	Lead
NC Report/La Razón	9–12 Dec 2015	3,000	45.8	16.8	7.8	6.3	10.3	13.0	29.0
InvyMark/laSexta	22–26 Jun 2015	1,200	30.6	38.6	8.7	4.1	0.5	17.5	8.0
InvyMark/laSexta	2–6 Feb 2015	1,200	41.6	17.4	–	23.3	–	17.7	18.3
InvyMark/laSexta	15–19 Dec 2014	1,200	29.5	32.7	–	23.8	–	14.0	3.2
InvyMark/laSexta	1–5 Dec 2014	?	21.2	28.6	–	19.1	–	31.1	7.4
InvyMark/laSexta	27–31 Oct 2014	?	22.8	24.7	–	21.8	–	30.7	1.9

== Leader ratings ==
The table below lists opinion polling on leader ratings, on a 0–10 scale: 0 would stand for a "terrible" rating, whereas 10 would stand for "excellent".

Polling firm/Commissioner	Fieldwork date	Sample size									
Polling firm/Commissioner	Fieldwork date	Sample size	Rajoy PP	Rubalcaba PSOE	Sánchez PSOE	Lara IU	Garzón IU	Díez UPyD	Herzog UPyD	Rivera C's	Iglesias Podemos
GIPEyOP	27 Nov–14 Dec 2015	14,005	2.64	–	4.04	–	4.92	–	3.00	4.54	3.98
InvyMark/laSexta	7–11 Dec 2015	?	–	–	4.53	–	4.30	–	–	4.89	4.30
Sigma Dos/El Mundo	1–9 Dec 2015	8,350	4.05	–	4.34	–	4.23	–	–	4.81	3.95
A+M/20minutos	23 Nov–4 Dec 2015	5,000	3.7	–	4.9	–	4.6	–	–	5.5	4.5
GESOP/El Periódico	23–28 Nov 2015	1,816	3.79	–	5.03	–	4.73	–	–	5.41	4.06
InvyMark/laSexta	23–27 Nov 2015	1,200	3.54	–	4.50	–	3.80	–	2.58	4.28	3.52
Sigma Dos/El Mundo	24–26 Nov 2015	1,500	4.01	–	4.39	–	4.00	–	–	4.93	3.61
CIS	27 Oct–16 Nov 2015	17,452	3.31	–	4.59	–	4.62	–	3.82	4.98	3.87
Sondaxe/La Voz de Galicia	28 Oct–9 Nov 2015	1,000	3.82	–	4.14	–	4.26	–	–	5.20	3.89
CIS	1–12 Oct 2015	2,493	2.82	–	3.84	3.53	–	3.37	–	–	–
InvyMark/laSexta	5–9 Oct 2015	?	3.33	–	4.47	–	3.77	–	2.64	4.51	3.36
Encuestamos	1–20 Jul 2015	1,450	2.4	–	4.6	–	4.3	–	–	4.1	4.5
InvyMark/laSexta	6–10 Jul 2015	1,200	3.40	–	4.48	–	3.80	2.36	–	4.18	3.68
CIS	1–9 Jul 2015	2,486	2.61	–	3.84	3.42	–	2.97	–	–	–
InvyMark/laSexta	22–26 Jun 2015	1,200	3.33	–	4.71	–	3.93	2.55	–	4.27	3.85
Encuestamos	1–23 Jun 2015	1,450	2.3	–	4.5	–	3.4	–	–	4.5	4.6
Encuestamos	1–12 May 2015	1,000	2.1	–	4.4	–	4.3	2.5	–	4.3	4.1
Encuestamos	2–20 Apr 2015	1,000	2.4	–	3.7	–	3.9	2.4	–	4.5	3.6
GESOP/El Periódico	8–13 Apr 2015	1,000	2.81	–	4.70	–	4.69	3.24	–	5.27	4.04
CIS	1–12 Apr 2015	2,479	2.49	–	3.59	3.43	–	3.00	–	–	–
Intercampo/GETS	13–29 Mar 2015	2,024	3.06	–	4.76	–	4.39	3.81	–	4.55	3.99
InvyMark/laSexta	23–27 Mar 2015	1,200	3.11	–	4.22	–	3.80	2.89	–	4.28	3.34
Encuestamos	24 Mar 2015	900	2.4	–	3.6	–	4.0	3.3	–	4.7	3.8
Encuestamos	25 Feb 2015	600	2.7	–	3.5	–	3.4	3.2	–	4.2	4.0
InvyMark/laSexta	23–26 Feb 2015	?	–	–	–	–	–	3.46	–	–	–
InvyMark/laSexta	2–6 Feb 2015	1,200	3.27	–	4.18	–	3.89	3.54	–	4.18	3.96
Encuestamos	22 Jan 2015	?	2.5	–	3.7	–	3.8	3.3	–	–	4.6
CIS	2–12 Jan 2015	2,481	2.24	–	3.68	3.53	–	3.66	–	–	–
InvyMark/laSexta	15–19 Dec 2014	1,200	2.88	–	4.26	–	4.01	3.77	–	4.00	4.24
GESOP/El Periódico	9–15 Dec 2014	1,000	2.65	–	4.56	–	4.60	4.15	–	4.62	4.56
DYM/El Confidencial	13 Dec 2014	?	2.6	–	3.7	–	3.9	3.7	–	4.2	3.9
InvyMark/laSexta	1–5 Dec 2014	?	2.95	–	4.13	–	3.95	3.53	–	3.75	4.25
Sigma Dos/El Mundo	17–19 Nov 2014	1,000	3.6	–	4.1	3.7	–	4.1	–	3.9	4.4
InvyMark/laSexta	10–14 Nov 2014	?	3.00	–	4.33	3.63	3.91	3.60	–	4.02	4.74
DYM/El Confidencial	28 Oct–6 Nov 2014	985	2.5	–	4.1	3.8	–	3.9	–	4.5	4.6
InvyMark/laSexta	27–31 Oct 2014	?	2.87	–	4.45	3.75	3.90	3.60	–	–	4.82
Asturbarómetro/ICNdiario	10–25 Oct 2014	402	3.5	–	3.4	3.4	–	4.3	–	–	4.4
InvyMark/laSexta	13–17 Oct 2014	?	3.03	–	3.91	3.36	–	3.50	–	–	4.13
CIS	1–13 Oct 2014	2,480	2.31	–	3.85	3.48	–	3.63	–	–	–
Intercampo/GETS	15 Sep–12 Oct 2014	1,724	2.44	–	4.79	3.72	–	3.64	–	–	4.79
InvyMark/laSexta	29 Sep–3 Oct 2014	?	3.23	–	4.14	3.47	–	3.56	–	–	4.14
InvyMark/laSexta	15–19 Sep 2014	?	3.25	–	4.05	3.46	–	3.45	–	–	4.08
Sigma Dos/El Mundo	26–28 Aug 2014	1,000	3.5	–	4.3	3.7	–	3.9	–	4.3	4.4
CIS	1–9 Jul 2014	2,471	2.34	3.12	–	3.35	–	3.52	–	–	–
GESOP/El Periódico	27–31 May 2014	1,000	3.10	3.42	–	4.14	–	4.24	–	4.65	5.44
Sigma Dos/El Mundo	13–15 May 2014	1,111	3.6	3.6	–	3.7	–	4.2	–	4.2	–
Feedback/La Vanguardia	30 Apr–8 May 2014	1,500	3.12	3.15	–	3.64	–	3.94	–	–	–
Sigma Dos/El Mundo	10–15 Apr 2014	1,000	3.6	4.0	–	3.7	–	4.3	–	4.2	–
CIS	1–7 Apr 2014	2,469	2.29	2.93	–	3.39	–	3.88	–	–	–
GESOP/El Periódico	20–23 Jan 2014	1,000	2.95	3.48	–	3.92	–	4.32	–	4.37	–
CIS	3–15 Jan 2014	2,480	2.22	3.00	–	3.72	–	4.15	–	–	–
InvyMark/laSexta	7–10 Jan 2014	?	2.80	3.21	–	4.33	–	3.92	–	–	–
Sigma Dos/El Mundo	26–28 Dec 2013	1,000	3.30	3.12	–	3.49	–	3.70	–	3.61	–
GESOP/El Periódico	25–28 Nov 2013	1,000	2.95	3.43	–	3.87	–	4.28	–	–	–
InvyMark/laSexta	18–22 Nov 2013	?	2.97	2.97	–	4.18	–	4.35	–	–	–
Sigma Dos/El Mundo	12–14 Nov 2013	1,000	3.36	3.12	–	3.24	–	3.76	–	–	–
GAD3/Antena 3	11–14 Nov 2013	801	3.7	3.5	–	3.5	–	4.0	–	–	–
DYM/El Confidencial	22–31 Oct 2013	967	2.4	2.7	–	3.3	–	3.8	–	–	–
InvyMark/laSexta	14–18 Oct 2013	?	3.17	3.58	–	–	–	–	–	–	–
Intercampo/GETS	16 Sep–14 Oct 2013	1,726	2.01	3.68	–	3.38	–	3.56	–	–	–
CIS	1–9 Oct 2013	2,485	2.42	3.13	–	3.81	–	4.28	–	–	–
GAD3/Antena 3	10–13 Sep 2013	935	3.5	3.3	–	3.4	–	3.8	–	–	–
InvyMark/laSexta	9–13 Sep 2013	?	2.83	2.92	–	–	–	–	–	–	–
Feedback/La Vanguardia	2–6 Sep 2013	1,500	3.01	3.14	–	3.63	–	4.13	–	–	–
Sigma Dos/El Mundo	16–18 Jul 2013	1,000	3.44	3.12	–	3.22	–	3.62	–	–	–
CIS	1–10 Jul 2013	2,476	2.45	3.14	–	3.59	–	4.12	–	–	–
GESOP/El Periódico	25–28 Jun 2013	1,000	3.16	3.78	–	4.14	–	4.52	–	–	–
Asturbarómetro/El Comercio	5 May–3 Jun 2013	403	3.1	2.6	–	2.6	–	3.1	–	–	–
GAD3/Antena 3	27–30 May 2013	1,000	3.5	3.1	–	3.3	–	3.7	–	–	–
InvyMark/laSexta	8–12 Apr 2013	?	3.38	3.52	–	–	–	–	–	–	–
CIS	1–8 Apr 2013	2,482	2.44	3.00	–	3.52	–	3.96	–	–	–
Sigma Dos/El Mundo	6–8 Feb 2013	1,000	3.45	3.23	–	3.57	–	3.99	–	–	–
GESOP/El Periódico	25–29 Jan 2013	1,000	3.08	3.84	–	4.10	–	4.56	–	–	–
InvyMark/laSexta	21–25 Jan 2013	?	3.12	3.54	–	–	–	–	–	–	–
CIS	4–14 Jan 2013	2,483	2.81	3.40	–	3.88	–	4.33	–	–	–
Sigma Dos/El Mundo	21–28 Dec 2012	1,000	3.55	3.34	–	3.32	–	3.72	–	–	–
InvyMark/laSexta	17–21 Dec 2012	?	3.33	3.43	–	–	–	–	–	–	–
MyWord/Cadena SER	26–31 Oct 2012	1,000	2.0	1.9	–	2.0	–	2.6	–	–	–
InvyMark/laSexta	22–26 Oct 2012	?	–	3.85	–	–	–	–	–	–	–
Intercampo/GETS	15 Sep–17 Oct 2012	1,724	2.63	4.09	–	3.52	–	3.40	–	–	–
CIS	2–14 Oct 2012	2,484	2.78	3.70	–	3.76	–	4.31	–	–	–
InvyMark/laSexta	17–21 Sep 2012	?	3.59	3.69	–	–	–	–	–	–	–
MyWord/Cadena SER	7–12 Sep 2012	1,100	2.0	2.1	–	2.2	–	2.8	–	–	–
Sigma Dos/El Mundo	17–19 Jul 2012	1,000	3.72	3.51	–	3.52	–	3.99	–	–	–
CIS	2–10 Jul 2012	2,484	3.33	3.80	–	3.77	–	4.36	–	–	–
DYM/ABC	27–28 Jun 2012	857	3.8	3.4	–	–	–	–	–	–	–
GESOP/El Periódico	14–18 Jun 2012	1,000	4.10	4.22	–	4.30	–	4.61	–	–	–
PP	16 Jun 2012	?	3.25	–	–	–	–	–	–	–	–
Sigma Dos/El Mundo	12–14 Jun 2012	1,000	4.38	3.87	–	3.60	–	4.12	–	–	–
InvyMark/laSexta	23–27 Apr 2012	?	4.33	4.06	–	–	–	–	–	–	–
CIS	9–17 Apr 2012	2,484	3.84	4.11	–	3.95	–	4.47	–	–	–
GESOP/El Periódico	23–28 Feb 2012	1,000	4.79	4.57	–	4.17	–	4.72	–	–	–
InvyMark/laSexta	23–27 Jan 2012	?	5.21	5.02	–	–	–	–	–	–	–
CIS	4–15 Jan 2012	2,480	4.55	4.25	–	4.17	–	4.75	–	–	–
CIS	24 Nov–15 Jan 2012	6,082	4.79	4.51	–	4.17	–	4.91	–	–	–
Metroscopia/El País	4–5 Jan 2012	1,000	4.60	–	–	–	–	–	–	–	–
Sigma Dos/El Mundo	27–29 Dec 2011	2,480	5.43	4.53	–	3.94	–	4.70	–	–	–

== Approval ratings ==
The tables below list the public approval ratings of the leaders and leading candidates of the main political parties in Spain.

=== Mariano Rajoy ===
Polling firm/Commissioner	Fieldwork date	Sample size	Mariano Rajoy (PP)			
Polling firm/Commissioner	Fieldwork date	Sample size	check	X mark	Question	Net
TNS Demoscopia/Antena 3	30 Nov–13 Dec 2015	1,017	34.0	61.3	4.7	−27.3
Simple Lógica	1–11 Dec 2015	1,005	29.2	67.2	3.6	−38.0
Metroscopia/El País	7–10 Dec 2015	2,800	32.0	65.0	3.0	−33.0
TNS Demoscopia/Antena 3	23 Nov–6 Dec 2015	1,035	37.6	58.0	4.4	−20.4
TNS Demoscopia/Antena 3	16–29 Nov 2015	1,033	35.1	59.7	5.2	−24.6
Metroscopia/El País	23–25 Nov 2015	1,200	26.0	71.0	3.0	−45.0
Simple Lógica	2–16 Nov 2015	1,746	27.3	68.9	3.8	−41.6
TNS Demoscopia/Antena 3	2–15 Nov 2015	1,018	30.5	63.1	6.4	−32.6
Metroscopia/El País	26–28 Oct 2015	1,400	28.0	70.0	2.0	−42.0
Simple Lógica	1–9 Oct 2015	1,047	23.9	70.9	5.3	−47.0
Metroscopia/El País	7–8 Oct 2015	1,200	25.0	73.0	2.0	−48.0
Metroscopia/El País	7–11 Sep 2015	1,800	28.0	69.0	3.0	−41.0
Simple Lógica	1–9 Sep 2015	?	24.9	?	?	−?
Simple Lógica	3–11 Aug 2015	1,022	25.5	68.9	5.5	−43.4
Metroscopia/El País	20–22 Jul 2015	1,000	25.0	73.0	2.0	−48.0
Simple Lógica	1–9 Jul 2015	1,040	20.7	74.5	4.8	−53.8
Metroscopia/El País	1–2 Jul 2015	1,000	25.0	73.0	2.0	−48.0
Simple Lógica	1–10 Jun 2015	1,026	20.2	?	?	−?
Metroscopia/El País	28 May–2 Jun 2015	2,000	23.0	75.0	2.0	−52.0
Simple Lógica	4–12 May 2015	1,064	20.2	?	?	−?
Simple Lógica	1–13 Apr 2015	1,059	19.9	74.8	5.2	−54.9
Metroscopia/El País	7–9 Apr 2015	1,000	25.0	73.0	2.0	−48.0
Simple Lógica	2–13 Mar 2015	1,058	22.2	75.5	2.3	−53.3
Metroscopia/El País	3–4 Mar 2015	1,000	24.0	74.0	2.0	−50.0
Simple Lógica	2–9 Feb 2015	1,058	21.7	74.6	3.7	−52.9
Metroscopia/El País	3–4 Feb 2015	1,000	23.0	73.0	4.0	−50.0
Simple Lógica	7–14 Jan 2015	1,025	22.0	74.8	3.2	−52.8
Metroscopia/El País	7–8 Jan 2015	1,000	23.0	73.0	4.0	−50.0
Metroscopia/El País	2–3 Dec 2014	1,000	19.0	79.0	2.0	−60.0
Metroscopia/El País	28–29 Oct 2014	1,000	18.0	81.0	1.0	−63.0
Simple Lógica	3–7 Mar 2014	1,068	21.5	74.6	4.0	−53.1
Metroscopia/El País	25 Feb–4 Mar 2014	1,200	22.0	76.0	2.0	−54.0
Simple Lógica	3–10 Feb 2014	1,119	21.6	?	?	−?
Metroscopia/El País	5–6 Feb 2014	1,200	19.0	78.0	3.0	−59.0
Simple Lógica	2–10 Jan 2014	1,030	18.6	?	?	−?
Metroscopia/El País	8–9 Jan 2014	1,200	18.0	78.0	4.0	−60.0
Simple Lógica	2–10 Dec 2013	1,044	20.0	?	?	−?
Simple Lógica	4–13 Nov 2013	1,959	17.9	?	?	−?
Simple Lógica	1–7 Oct 2013	1,001	19.2	75.4	5.3	−56.2
Metroscopia/El País	2–3 Oct 2013	1,000	21.0	75.0	4.0	−54.0
Simple Lógica	3–9 Sep 2013	?	21.6	?	?	−?
Simple Lógica	1–10 Aug 2013	1,025	20.2	?	?	−?
Simple Lógica	1–9 Jul 2013	1,012	18.1	?	?	−?
Metroscopia/El País	3–4 Jul 2013	1,000	19.0	77.0	4.0	−58.0
Simple Lógica	3–11 Jun 2013	1,018	19.7	?	?	−?
Metroscopia/El País	5–6 Jun 2013	1,000	20.0	76.0	4.0	−56.0
Simple Lógica	3–10 May 2013	987	16.7	?	?	−?
Metroscopia/El País	8–9 May 2013	1,000	19.0	77.0	4.0	−58.0
Simple Lógica	1–8 Apr 2013	1,010	19.1	?	?	−?
Metroscopia/El País	3–4 Apr 2013	1,000	19.0	76.0	5.0	−57.0
Simple Lógica	4–8 Mar 2013	1,017	18.2	74.6	7.2	−56.4
Metroscopia/El País	27–28 Feb 2013	1,000	22.0	73.0	5.0	−51.0
Simple Lógica	4–8 Feb 2013	?	19.6	?	?	−?
Metroscopia/El País	30 Jan–1 Feb 2013	2,000	19.0	77.0	4.0	−58.0
Simple Lógica	7–11 Jan 2013	?	22.6	?	?	−?
Metroscopia/El País	9–10 Jan 2013	1,000	21.0	74.0	5.0	−53.0
Simple Lógica	3–10 Dec 2012	1,009	19.6	?	?	−?
Metroscopia/El País	28–29 Nov 2012	1,000	25.0	71.0	4.0	−46.0
Simple Lógica	1–8 Nov 2012	1,025	25.7	?	?	−?
Metroscopia/El País	6–7 Nov 2012	1,000	25.0	70.0	5.0	−45.0
Simple Lógica	1–11 Oct 2012	?	22.1	?	?	−?
Metroscopia/El País	3–4 Oct 2012	1,000	23.0	71.0	6.0	−48.0
Simple Lógica	3–13 Sep 2012	1,776	25.3	70.0	4.7	−44.7
Metroscopia/El País	5–6 Sep 2012	1,000	21.0	73.0	6.0	−52.0
Simple Lógica	1–10 Aug 2012	2,009	26.7	?	?	−?
Metroscopia/El País	25–26 Jul 2012	1,000	25.0	69.0	6.0	−44.0
Simple Lógica	2–10 Jul 2012	1,006	28.9	?	?	−?
Metroscopia/El País	4–5 Jul 2012	1,000	30.0	65.0	5.0	−35.0
Simple Lógica	1–15 Jun 2012	1,017	32.2	?	?	−?
Metroscopia/El País	6–7 Jun 2012	1,004	31.0	63.0	6.0	−32.0
Simple Lógica	1–11 May 2012	1,015	32.9	60.6	6.5	−27.7
Metroscopia/El País	9–10 May 2012	1,001	32.0	61.0	7.0	−29.0
Metroscopia/El País	11–12 Apr 2012	1,000	32.0	58.0	10.0	−26.0
Simple Lógica	1–11 Apr 2012	1,026	39.9	?	?	−?
Metroscopia/El País	29 Feb–1 Mar 2012	1,007	35.0	51.0	14.0	−16.0
Metroscopia/El País	8–9 Feb 2012	1,003	40.0	40.0	20.0	±0.0
Metroscopia/El País	4–5 Jan 2012	1,000	53.0	35.0	12.0	+18.0

=== Pedro Sánchez ===
Polling firm/Commissioner	Fieldwork date	Sample size	Pedro Sánchez (PSOE)			
Polling firm/Commissioner	Fieldwork date	Sample size	check	X mark	Question	Net
TNS Demoscopia/Antena 3	30 Nov–13 Dec 2015	1,017	44.1	48.3	7.6	−4.2
Simple Lógica	1–11 Dec 2015	1,005	29.7	60.5	9.8	−30.8
Metroscopia/El País	7–10 Dec 2015	2,800	36.0	56.0	8.0	−20.0
TNS Demoscopia/Antena 3	23 Nov–6 Dec 2015	1,035	47.3	44.5	8.2	+2.8
TNS Demoscopia/Antena 3	16–29 Nov 2015	1,033	49.3	42.8	7.9	+6.5
Metroscopia/El País	23–25 Nov 2015	1,200	37.0	53.0	10.0	−16.0
Simple Lógica	2–16 Nov 2015	1,746	31.0	56.3	12.7	−25.3
TNS Demoscopia/Antena 3	2–15 Nov 2015	1,018	41.4	49.2	9.4	−7.8
Metroscopia/El País	26–28 Oct 2015	1,400	33.0	57.0	10.0	−24.0
Simple Lógica	1–9 Oct 2015	1,047	25.9	59.7	14.3	−33.8
Metroscopia/El País	7–8 Oct 2015	1,200	34.0	56.0	10.0	−22.0
Metroscopia/El País	7–11 Sep 2015	1,800	44.0	45.0	11.0	−1.0
Simple Lógica	1–9 Sep 2015	?	24.7	?	?	−?
Simple Lógica	3–11 Aug 2015	1,022	26.8	58.9	14.3	−32.1
Metroscopia/El País	20–22 Jul 2015	1,000	38.0	54.0	8.0	−16.0
Simple Lógica	1–9 Jul 2015	1,040	26.8	61.0	12.2	−34.2
Metroscopia/El País	1–2 Jul 2015	1,000	35.0	56.0	9.0	−21.0
Simple Lógica	1–10 Jun 2015	1,026	27.9	?	?	−?
Metroscopia/El País	28 May–2 Jun 2015	2,000	45.0	44.0	11.0	+1.0
Simple Lógica	4–12 May 2015	1,064	25.4	?	?	−?
Simple Lógica	1–13 Apr 2015	1,059	27.3	58.0	14.7	−30.7
Metroscopia/El País	7–9 Apr 2015	1,000	36.0	48.0	16.0	−12.0
Simple Lógica	2–13 Mar 2015	1,058	27.6	61.1	11.3	−33.5
Metroscopia/El País	3–4 Mar 2015	1,000	36.0	50.0	14.0	−14.0
Simple Lógica	2–9 Feb 2015	1,058	24.0	58.2	17.8	−34.2
Metroscopia/El País	3–4 Feb 2015	1,000	31.0	54.0	15.0	−23.0
Simple Lógica	7–14 Jan 2015	1,025	26.6	58.6	14.9	−32.0
Metroscopia/El País	7–8 Jan 2015	1,000	32.0	48.0	20.0	−16.0
Metroscopia/El País	2–3 Dec 2014	1,000	29.0	53.0	18.0	−24.0
Metroscopia/El País	28–29 Oct 2014	1,000	32.0	49.0	19.0	−17.0

=== Alfredo Pérez Rubalcaba ===
Polling firm/Commissioner	Fieldwork date	Sample size	Alfredo Pérez Rubalcaba (PSOE)			
Polling firm/Commissioner	Fieldwork date	Sample size	check	X mark	Question	Net
Simple Lógica	3–7 Mar 2014	1,068	15.8	78.6	5.6	−62.8
Simple Lógica	3–10 Feb 2014	1,119	13.8	?	?	−?
Simple Lógica	2–10 Jan 2014	1,030	11.4	?	?	−?
Simple Lógica	2–10 Dec 2013	1,044	12.4	?	?	−?
Simple Lógica	4–13 Nov 2013	1,959	12.5	?	?	−?
Simple Lógica	1–7 Oct 2013	1,001	13.2	80.5	6.3	−67.3
Metroscopia/El País	2–3 Oct 2013	1,000	11.0	85.0	4.0	−74.0
Simple Lógica	3–9 Sep 2013	?	15.4	?	?	−?
Simple Lógica	1–10 Aug 2013	1,025	14.0	?	?	−?
Simple Lógica	1–9 Jul 2013	1,012	14.7	?	?	−?
Metroscopia/El País	3–4 Jul 2013	1,000	11.0	84.0	5.0	−73.0
Simple Lógica	3–11 Jun 2013	1,018	9.8	?	?	−?
Metroscopia/El País	5–6 Jun 2013	1,000	11.0	84.0	5.0	−73.0
Simple Lógica	3–10 May 2013	987	11.3	?	?	−?
Metroscopia/El País	8–9 May 2013	1,000	9.0	87.0	4.0	−78.0
Simple Lógica	1–8 Apr 2013	1,010	11.2	?	?	−?
Metroscopia/El País	3–4 Apr 2013	1,000	10.0	85.0	5.0	−75.0
Simple Lógica	4–8 Mar 2013	1,017	10.9	80.9	8.2	−70.0
Metroscopia/El País	27–28 Feb 2013	1,000	8.0	87.0	5.0	−79.0
Simple Lógica	4–8 Feb 2013	?	14.8	?	?	−?
Metroscopia/El País	30 Jan–1 Feb 2013	2,000	15.0	81.0	4.0	−66.0
Simple Lógica	7–11 Jan 2013	?	13.2	?	?	−?
Metroscopia/El País	9–10 Jan 2013	1,000	12.0	81.0	7.0	−69.0
Simple Lógica	3–10 Dec 2012	1,009	14.8	?	?	−?
Metroscopia/El País	28–29 Nov 2012	1,000	11.0	84.0	5.0	−73.0
Simple Lógica	1–8 Nov 2012	1,025	15.0	?	?	−?
Metroscopia/El País	6–7 Nov 2012	1,000	16.0	79.0	5.0	−63.0
Simple Lógica	1–11 Oct 2012	?	15.3	?	?	−?
Metroscopia/El País	3–4 Oct 2012	1,000	15.0	76.0	9.0	−61.0
Simple Lógica	3–13 Sep 2012	1,776	18.3	74.9	6.8	−56.6
Metroscopia/El País	5–6 Sep 2012	1,000	16.0	74.0	10.0	−58.0
Simple Lógica	1–10 Aug 2012	2,009	18.9	?	?	−?
Metroscopia/El País	25–26 Jul 2012	1,000	19.0	76.0	5.0	−57.0
Simple Lógica	2–10 Jul 2012	1,006	21.0	?	?	−?
Metroscopia/El País	4–5 Jul 2012	1,000	23.0	70.0	7.0	−53.0
Simple Lógica	1–15 Jun 2012	1,017	21.1	?	?	−?
Metroscopia/El País	6–7 Jun 2012	1,004	22.0	69.0	9.0	−47.0
Simple Lógica	1–11 May 2012	1,015	22.2	68.4	9.5	−46.2
Metroscopia/El País	9–10 May 2012	1,001	28.0	64.0	8.0	−36.0
Metroscopia/El País	11–12 Apr 2012	1,000	31.0	58.0	11.0	−27.0
Simple Lógica	1–11 Apr 2012	1,026	26.9	?	?	−?
Metroscopia/El País	29 Feb–1 Mar 2012	1,007	35.0	52.0	13.0	−17.0

=== Alberto Garzón ===
Polling firm/Commissioner	Fieldwork date	Sample size	Alberto Garzón (IU)			
Polling firm/Commissioner	Fieldwork date	Sample size	check	X mark	Question	Net
TNS Demoscopia/Antena 3	30 Nov–13 Dec 2015	1,017	44.7	46.8	8.5	−2.1
Simple Lógica	1–11 Dec 2015	1,005	31.3	54.6	14.1	−23.3
Metroscopia/El País	7–10 Dec 2015	2,800	41.0	49.0	10.0	−8.0
TNS Demoscopia/Antena 3	23 Nov–6 Dec 2015	1,035	43.4	48.5	8.1	−5.1
TNS Demoscopia/Antena 3	16–29 Nov 2015	1,033	41.9	48.7	9.4	−6.8
Metroscopia/El País	23–25 Nov 2015	1,200	37.0	51.0	12.0	−14.0
Simple Lógica	2–16 Nov 2015	1,746	29.0	52.4	18.6	−23.4
TNS Demoscopia/Antena 3	2–15 Nov 2015	1,018	44.8	45.4	9.8	−0.6
Metroscopia/El País	26–28 Oct 2015	1,400	40.0	49.0	11.0	−9.0
Simple Lógica	1–9 Oct 2015	1,047	21.5	60.8	17.8	−39.3
Metroscopia/El País	7–8 Oct 2015	1,200	32.0	56.0	12.0	−24.0
Metroscopia/El País	7–11 Sep 2015	1,800	44.0	45.0	11.0	−1.0
Simple Lógica	1–9 Sep 2015	?	27.4	?	?	−?
Simple Lógica	3–11 Aug 2015	1,022	24.7	54.1	21.2	−29.4
Metroscopia/El País	20–22 Jul 2015	1,000	36.0	52.0	12.0	−16.0
Simple Lógica	1–9 Jul 2015	1,040	24.1	58.9	17.0	−34.8
Metroscopia/El País	1–2 Jul 2015	1,000	34.0	53.0	13.0	−19.0
Simple Lógica	1–10 Jun 2015	1,026	27.1	?	?	−?
Metroscopia/El País	28 May–2 Jun 2015	2,000	43.0	42.0	15.0	+1.0
Simple Lógica	4–12 May 2015	1,064	26.0	?	?	−?
Simple Lógica	1–13 Apr 2015	1,059	24.2	54.1	21.7	−29.9
Metroscopia/El País	7–9 Apr 2015	1,000	36.0	48.0	16.0	−12.0
Simple Lógica	2–13 Mar 2015	1,058	28.9	54.8	16.3	−25.9
Metroscopia/El País	3–4 Mar 2015	1,000	39.0	48.0	13.0	−9.0
Metroscopia/El País	3–4 Feb 2015	1,000	36.0	48.0	16.0	−12.0
Metroscopia/El País	7–8 Jan 2015	1,000	35.0	45.0	20.0	−10.0
Metroscopia/El País	2–3 Dec 2014	1,000	31.0	52.0	17.0	−21.0

=== Cayo Lara ===
Polling firm/Commissioner	Fieldwork date	Sample size	Cayo Lara (IU)			
Polling firm/Commissioner	Fieldwork date	Sample size	check	X mark	Question	Net
Simple Lógica	2–9 Feb 2015	1,058	20.3	63.7	16.0	−43.4
Simple Lógica	7–14 Jan 2015	1,025	22.7	64.2	13.2	−41.5
Metroscopia/El País	2–3 Dec 2014	1,000	33.0	60.0	7.0	−27.0
Metroscopia/El País	28–29 Oct 2014	1,000	28.0	62.0	10.0	−34.0
Simple Lógica	3–7 Mar 2014	1,068	22.7	62.8	14.5	−40.1
Simple Lógica	1–7 Oct 2013	1,001	21.6	62.9	15.5	−41.3
Metroscopia/El País	2–3 Oct 2013	1,000	19.0	65.0	16.0	−46.0
Metroscopia/El País	3–4 Jul 2013	1,000	16.0	65.0	19.0	−49.0
Metroscopia/El País	5–6 Jun 2013	1,000	18.0	65.0	17.0	−47.0
Metroscopia/El País	8–9 May 2013	1,000	17.0	65.0	18.0	−48.0
Metroscopia/El País	3–4 Apr 2013	1,000	18.0	62.0	20.0	−44.0
Simple Lógica	4–8 Mar 2013	1,017	17.7	63.6	18.6	−45.9
Metroscopia/El País	27–28 Feb 2013	1,000	19.0	61.0	20.0	−42.0
Metroscopia/El País	30 Jan–1 Feb 2013	2,000	19.0	61.0	20.0	−42.0
Metroscopia/El País	9–10 Jan 2013	1,000	19.0	59.0	22.0	−40.0
Simple Lógica	3–13 Sep 2012	1,776	15.8	65.9	18.3	−50.1
Simple Lógica	1–11 May 2012	1,015	20.2	55.2	24.6	−35.0

=== Andrés Herzog ===
Polling firm/Commissioner	Fieldwork date	Sample size	Andrés Herzog (UPyD)			
Polling firm/Commissioner	Fieldwork date	Sample size	check	X mark	Question	Net
Simple Lógica	1–11 Dec 2015	1,005	14.4	51.9	33.8	−37.5
Simple Lógica	2–16 Nov 2015	1,746	10.4	48.4	41.2	−38.0
Simple Lógica	1–9 Oct 2015	1,047	9.1	49.3	41.6	−40.2
Simple Lógica	1–9 Sep 2015	?	10.9	?	?	−?
Simple Lógica	3–11 Aug 2015	1,022	6.2	49.0	44.7	−42.8

=== Rosa Díez ===
Polling firm/Commissioner	Fieldwork date	Sample size	Rosa Díez (UPyD)			
Polling firm/Commissioner	Fieldwork date	Sample size	check	X mark	Question	Net
Simple Lógica	1–9 Jul 2015	1,040	15.8	73.1	11.1	−57.3
Metroscopia/El País	1–2 Jul 2015	1,000	21.0	72.0	7.0	−51.0
Simple Lógica	1–10 Jun 2015	1,026	19.6	?	?	−?
Metroscopia/El País	28 May–2 Jun 2015	2,000	22.0	70.0	8.0	−48.0
Simple Lógica	1–13 Apr 2015	1,059	17.2	70.2	12.6	−53.0
Metroscopia/El País	7–9 Apr 2015	1,000	21.0	70.0	9.0	−49.0
Simple Lógica	2–13 Mar 2015	1,058	29.0	61.3	9.6	−32.3
Metroscopia/El País	3–4 Mar 2015	1,000	37.0	52.0	11.0	−15.0
Simple Lógica	2–9 Feb 2015	1,058	28.8	58.2	13.0	−29.4
Metroscopia/El País	3–4 Feb 2015	1,000	36.0	54.0	10.0	−18.0
Simple Lógica	7–14 Jan 2015	1,025	31.3	57.9	10.8	−26.6
Metroscopia/El País	7–8 Jan 2015	1,000	39.0	51.0	10.0	−12.0
Metroscopia/El País	2–3 Dec 2014	1,000	32.0	61.0	7.0	−29.0
Metroscopia/El País	28–29 Oct 2014	1,000	37.0	55.0	8.0	−18.0
Simple Lógica	3–7 Mar 2014	1,068	32.2	55.6	12.2	−23.4
Simple Lógica	1–7 Oct 2013	1,001	31.4	53.5	15.0	−22.1
Metroscopia/El País	2–3 Oct 2013	1,000	28.0	58.0	14.0	−30.0
Metroscopia/El País	3–4 Jul 2013	1,000	25.0	59.0	16.0	−34.0
Metroscopia/El País	5–6 Jun 2013	1,000	27.0	58.0	15.0	−31.0
Metroscopia/El País	8–9 May 2013	1,000	28.0	60.0	12.0	−32.0
Metroscopia/El País	3–4 Apr 2013	1,000	25.0	58.0	17.0	−33.0
Metroscopia/El País	27–28 Feb 2013	1,000	27.0	58.0	15.0	−31.0
Metroscopia/El País	30 Jan–1 Feb 2013	2,000	29.0	54.0	17.0	−25.0
Metroscopia/El País	9–10 Jan 2013	1,000	27.0	55.0	18.0	−28.0

=== Pablo Iglesias ===
Polling firm/Commissioner	Fieldwork date	Sample size	Pablo Iglesias (Podemos)			
Polling firm/Commissioner	Fieldwork date	Sample size	check	X mark	Question	Net
TNS Demoscopia/Antena 3	30 Nov–13 Dec 2015	1,017	39.6	54.7	5.7	−15.1
Simple Lógica	1–11 Dec 2015	1,005	30.6	62.4	7.0	−31.8
Metroscopia/El País	7–10 Dec 2015	2,800	35.0	59.0	6.0	−24.0
TNS Demoscopia/Antena 3	23 Nov–6 Dec 2015	1,035	36.5	56.4	7.1	−19.9
TNS Demoscopia/Antena 3	16–29 Nov 2015	1,033	37.0	56.4	6.6	−19.4
Metroscopia/El País	23–25 Nov 2015	1,200	30.0	64.0	6.0	−34.0
Simple Lógica	2–16 Nov 2015	1,746	28.1	62.4	9.5	−34.3
TNS Demoscopia/Antena 3	2–15 Nov 2015	1,018	32.7	58.8	8.5	−26.1
Metroscopia/El País	26–28 Oct 2015	1,400	28.0	65.0	7.0	−37.0
Simple Lógica	1–9 Oct 2015	1,047	22.7	66.8	10.5	−44.1
Metroscopia/El País	7–8 Oct 2015	1,200	24.0	68.0	8.0	−44.0
Metroscopia/El País	7–11 Sep 2015	1,800	32.0	60.0	8.0	−28.0
Simple Lógica	1–9 Sep 2015	?	22.2	?	?	−?
Simple Lógica	3–11 Aug 2015	1,022	24.3	64.5	11.1	−40.2
Metroscopia/El País	20–22 Jul 2015	1,000	31.0	63.0	6.0	−32.0
Simple Lógica	1–9 Jul 2015	1,040	26.7	64.0	9.3	−37.3
Metroscopia/El País	1–2 Jul 2015	1,000	29.0	61.0	10.0	−32.0
Simple Lógica	1–10 Jun 2015	1,026	34.9	?	?	−?
Metroscopia/El País	28 May–2 Jun 2015	2,000	44.0	47.0	9.0	−3.0
Simple Lógica	4–12 May 2015	1,064	27.4	?	?	−?
Simple Lógica	1–13 Apr 2015	1,059	26.5	60.5	13.1	−34.0
Metroscopia/El País	7–9 Apr 2015	1,000	29.0	59.0	12.0	−30.0
Simple Lógica	2–13 Mar 2015	1,058	31.1	61.2	7.6	−30.1
Metroscopia/El País	3–4 Mar 2015	1,000	32.0	58.0	10.0	−26.0
Simple Lógica	2–9 Feb 2015	1,058	32.6	54.8	12.5	−22.2
Metroscopia/El País	3–4 Feb 2015	1,000	34.0	54.0	12.0	−20.0
Simple Lógica	7–14 Jan 2015	1,025	33.6	54.9	11.5	−21.3
Metroscopia/El País	7–8 Jan 2015	1,000	36.0	49.0	15.0	−13.0
Metroscopia/El País	2–3 Dec 2014	1,000	34.0	51.0	15.0	−17.0
Metroscopia/El País	28–29 Oct 2014	1,000	44.0	43.0	13.0	+1.0

=== Albert Rivera ===
Polling firm/Commissioner	Fieldwork date	Sample size	Albert Rivera (C's)			
Polling firm/Commissioner	Fieldwork date	Sample size	check	X mark	Question	Net
TNS Demoscopia/Antena 3	30 Nov–13 Dec 2015	1,017	59.7	33.6	6.7	+26.1
Simple Lógica	1–11 Dec 2015	1,005	47.8	43.9	8.3	+3.9
Metroscopia/El País	7–10 Dec 2015	2,800	52.0	41.0	7.0	+11.0
TNS Demoscopia/Antena 3	23 Nov–6 Dec 2015	1,035	62.9	30.7	6.4	+32.2
TNS Demoscopia/Antena 3	16–29 Nov 2015	1,033	65.4	28.6	6.0	+36.8
Metroscopia/El País	23–25 Nov 2015	1,200	51.0	40.0	9.0	+11.0
Simple Lógica	2–16 Nov 2015	1,746	49.9	39.2	10.9	+10.7
TNS Demoscopia/Antena 3	2–15 Nov 2015	1,018	62.9	29.1	8.0	+33.8
Metroscopia/El País	26–28 Oct 2015	1,400	54.0	37.0	9.0	+17.0
Simple Lógica	1–9 Oct 2015	1,047	42.8	44.7	12.5	−1.9
Metroscopia/El País	7–8 Oct 2015	1,200	54.0	37.0	9.0	+17.0
Metroscopia/El País	7–11 Sep 2015	1,800	56.0	36.0	8.0	+20.0
Simple Lógica	1–9 Sep 2015	?	39.9	?	?	−?
Simple Lógica	3–11 Aug 2015	1,022	40.6	45.8	13.6	−5.2
Metroscopia/El País	20–22 Jul 2015	1,000	50.0	42.0	8.0	+8.0
Simple Lógica	1–9 Jul 2015	1,040	41.3	47.2	11.5	−5.9
Metroscopia/El País	1–2 Jul 2015	1,000	50.0	43.0	7.0	+7.0
Simple Lógica	1–10 Jun 2015	1,026	37.7	?	?	−?
Metroscopia/El País	28 May–2 Jun 2015	2,000	57.0	33.0	10.0	+24.0
Simple Lógica	4–12 May 2015	1,064	38.0	?	?	−?
Simple Lógica	1–13 Apr 2015	1,059	39.4	43.1	17.5	−3.7
Metroscopia/El País	7–9 Apr 2015	1,000	53.0	35.0	12.0	+18.0
Simple Lógica	2–13 Mar 2015	1,058	43.8	41.5	14.7	+2.3
Metroscopia/El País	3–4 Mar 2015	1,000	56.0	33.0	11.0	+23.0
Metroscopia/El País	3–4 Feb 2015	1,000	49.0	37.0	14.0	+12.0
Metroscopia/El País	7–8 Jan 2015	1,000	46.0	41.0	13.0	+5.0
