= La Tuerka =

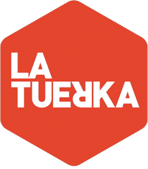
- Presented by: Pablo Iglesias Turrión; Facu Díaz; Tania Sánchez; Juan Carlos Monedero
- Country of origin: Spain
- Original language: Spanish
- No. of seasons: 5

Production
- Production company: Producciones CMI

Original release
- Network: Tele K, Público TV, YouTube
- Release: 18 November 2010 – present

La Tuerka is a Spanish television show, produced by Producciones CMI, broadcast by Público TV over the Internet and by Tele K via TDT, with Pablo Iglesias Turrión as one of the presenters. The program airs on Mondays and Fridays at 10:00 pm on its YouTube channel, which has amassed almost 30 million views.

== History ==
=== Fifth season ===
The fifth season of La Tuerka introduced several changes to the program's format. Since then, it has consisted of several different shows:

Otra vuelta de Tuerka: Airs every Monday, presented by Pablo Iglesias. It consists of a face-to-face interview with various personalities. The interviewees have included, among others, Jesús Cintora, politician and lawyer Cristina Almeida, and former basketball player Fernando Romay.

La Tuerka Distrito Federal: A program of research, reporting, and discussion presented by Noelia Vera and Tania Sánchez, which airs on Tuesdays.

La Tuerka News: An informative and humorous program presented by Facu Díaz and Héctor Juanatey, which airs on Wednesdays.

En Clave Tuerka: A conversation with several guests, presented by Juan Carlos Monedero, which airs on Thursdays.

Tuerka Sound: Music videos.

El Tornillo: A feminist video blog.

In October 2014, the program was awarded a journalism prize at the Premios Enfocados de Periodismo 2014.
