= Instituto Severo Ochoa =

Instituto Severo Ochoa may refer to the following Spanish secondary schools:

In Spain:

- Instituto Severo Ochoa in Alcobendas, Community of Madrid
- Institut Severo Ochoa in Esplugues de Llobregat, Catalonia
- Instituto de Educación Secundaria Severo Ochoa in Elche

Outside of Spain:

- Instituto Español Severo Ochoa in Tangier, Morocco
