= Tania Sánchez =

Spanish politician (born 1979)

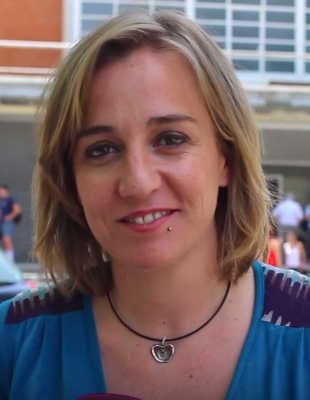
- Tania Sánchez in 2016

Member of the Assembly of Madrid
- Incumbent
- Assumed office 11 June 2019
- In office 7 June 2011 – 16 February 2015

Member of the Congress of Deputies
- In office 13 January 2016 – 5 March 2019
- Constituency: Madrid

Rivas-Vaciamadrid city councillor
- In office 16 June 2007 – 11 June 2011

Personal details
- Born: 29 April 1979 (age 47) Madrid, Spain
- Citizenship: Spanish
- Party: Más Madrid (since 2019)
- Other political affiliations: Podemos (2016–2019); United Left (2003–2015)
- Domestic partner: Pablo Iglesias Turrión (2008-2015)
- Occupation: Social educator, politician

Tania Sánchez Melero (born 29 April 1979) is a Spanish politician. She was United Left member in the Assembly of Madrid until she left the party on 4 February 2015. She was again elected for the Assembly in 2019 as a member of Más Madrid. From 2016 to 2019 she was MP for Podemos.

== Biography ==
Tania Sánchez was born in Madrid in 1979. She holds a bachelor's degree in Social Education.

As a teenager, she participated in several organizations related to the Punk subculture and against the bullfights. She started her political life in the municipality of Rivas Vaciamadrid, where her family is strongly linked to the ruling United Left. In 2007 she was elected to the city council where she was the Deputy Spokesperson of the United Left municipal group, and designated to the Executive Board as has been Councillor-head of the Departments of Culture, Festivals and Cooperation for Development.

In the 2011 elections she was elected to the Madrid Assembly.

In 2012 Sanchez led one of the three lists that contended the 9th Regional Assembly of United Left of the Community of Madrid, coming third and obtaining 12% of the votes and 12 seats in the Regional Political Council. and was elected as member to the Regional Executive Bureau of IU-CM.

In October 2014 she announced her intention to seek the nomination of United Left for the Presidency of the Community of Madrid in the open primary that would be held in November that year. Sanchez co-campaigned in the election with Mauricio Valiente who sought the nomination for Mayor of Madrid. On the primary Election held in 30 November Tania Sanchez obtained a landslide victory in the Primary election over the candidate supported by the party leadership Jose Antonio Moreno and minority Candidate Julian Sanchez Vizcaino. (Note: Following her victory at the election, the Coordinator of IU–CM, Eddy Sánchez, handed in his resignation.)

On 4 February 2015, after her disagreements with the management of the Madrid federation, she left the United Left, looking forward to founding a new party in Madrid.

She is a usual participant in several TV debates such as Al rojo vivo, La Tuerka, Dando caña and El gato al agua.
