= Dina Bousselham =

Moroccan political advisor (born 1990)

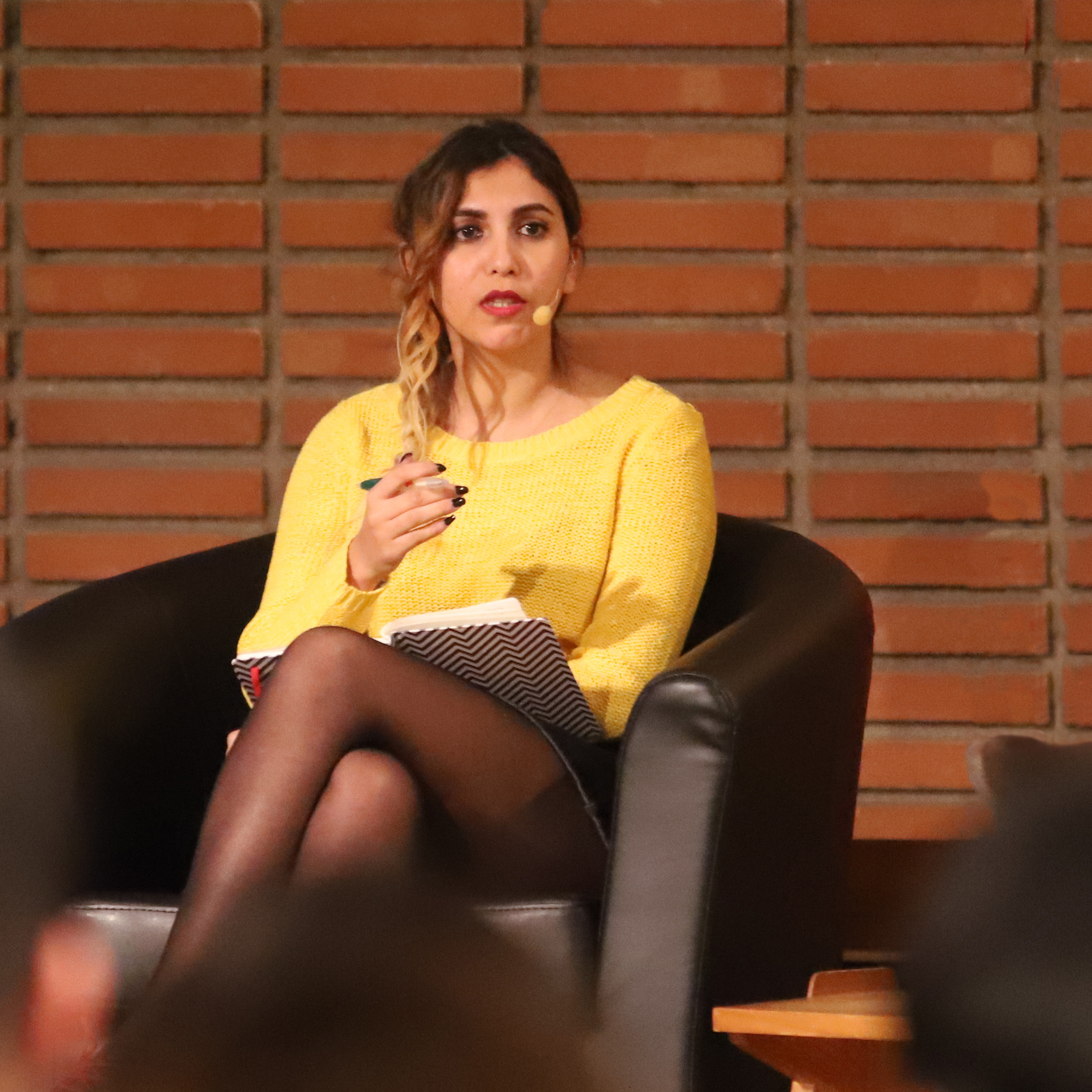
- Born: July 27, 1990 (age 36); Tangier, Morocco
- Education: Complutense University of Madrid; Institut des hautes études de l'Amérique latine; University of Sorbonne Nouvelle Paris 3
- Occupations: Political advisor; News editor; Political scientist; Football player
- Years active: 2013–
- Known for: Advisor to Pablo Iglesias Turrión in Podemos

Dina Bousselham (born 1990) is a Moroccan political advisor, candidate, and political scientist affiliated with the Spanish political party Podemos, and the director of the online newspaper La Última Hora! As a political science student at the Complutense University of Madrid she took classes with Pablo Iglesias Turrión, who was a lecturer there. When Iglesias founded Podemos in 2014 and won election as a Member of the European Parliament, he chose Bousselham as the head of his cabinet of advisors. Bousselham was later named as a manager of the Podemos party apparatus in Madrid, and she was chosen in a primary election as a Podemos candidate for the regional citizens council in 2019. However, after her application for Spanish citizenship was denied, she was not able to contest the general election. In 2020, she left Podemos to head the digital news service La Última Hora!

== Early life and education ==
Bousselham was born in 1990 in Tangier, and studied at the Instituto Español Severo Ochoa. In 2008, at the age of 18, she moved to Madrid to study and to play football. She attended the Complutense University of Madrid where she studied political science. At the same time, she played football competitively in the CF Pozuelo and the club Santa Maria Caridad. She stopped playing competitive football in 2010 to focus on her studies. One of her professors of politics at the Complutense University was Pablo Iglesias Turrión. Bousselham also took part in the Erasmus Programme at the University of Sorbonne Nouvelle Paris 3. After graduating in political science from the Complutense University, Bousselham completed a Master's degree at the Paris Institute for Advanced Studies in Latin America (fr). She then returned to Madrid and completed a diploma in international relations, focusing on the prevention of international conflicts and cooperation and security in the Mediterranean region.

== Career ==
When Pablo Iglesias Turrión founded the Spanish political party Podemos in 2014, he selected Bousselham as a prominent assistant to work with him in the European Parliament. She became the head of his cabinet of advisors in the European Parliament. While she was a prominent assistant of Pablo Iglesias, a mobile phone that contained sensitive party information was stolen from her. Later, the Police Commissioner José Manuel Villarejo was potentially implicated in possessing copies of the information that had been on the phone's memory card, which led to a court case investigating the possibility that the theft was politically motivated. During the investigation it was discovered that the journalist Antonio Asensio had given Iglesias the card of the stolen mobile phone and that he had had it in his possession for a year and a half without telling Bousselham.

In 2016, Bousselham was a member of Ramón Espinar Merino's candidacy list in the internal primary of Podemos Madrid, and she was elected to be a member of the Regional Citizens Council. In 2018 she applied to become a Spanish citizen, which is a necessary prerequisite for running as a candidate in regional elections. After Espinar resigned as the secretary general of Madrid Podemos, Bousselham was a member of the management appointed by the state party leadership to manage the party organization. However, Bousselham was not granted Spanish citizenship after her application in 2018, and she was not able to appear on the party list in the November 2019 Spanish general election.

In May 2020, Bousselham departed from Podemos to head the left-leaning online news source La Última Hora! This digital news service advertises itself as being independent of political parties but not politically neutral, and retains informal links to Podemos.
