= Eddy Sánchez =

Spanish politician

Eddy Sánchez Iglesias
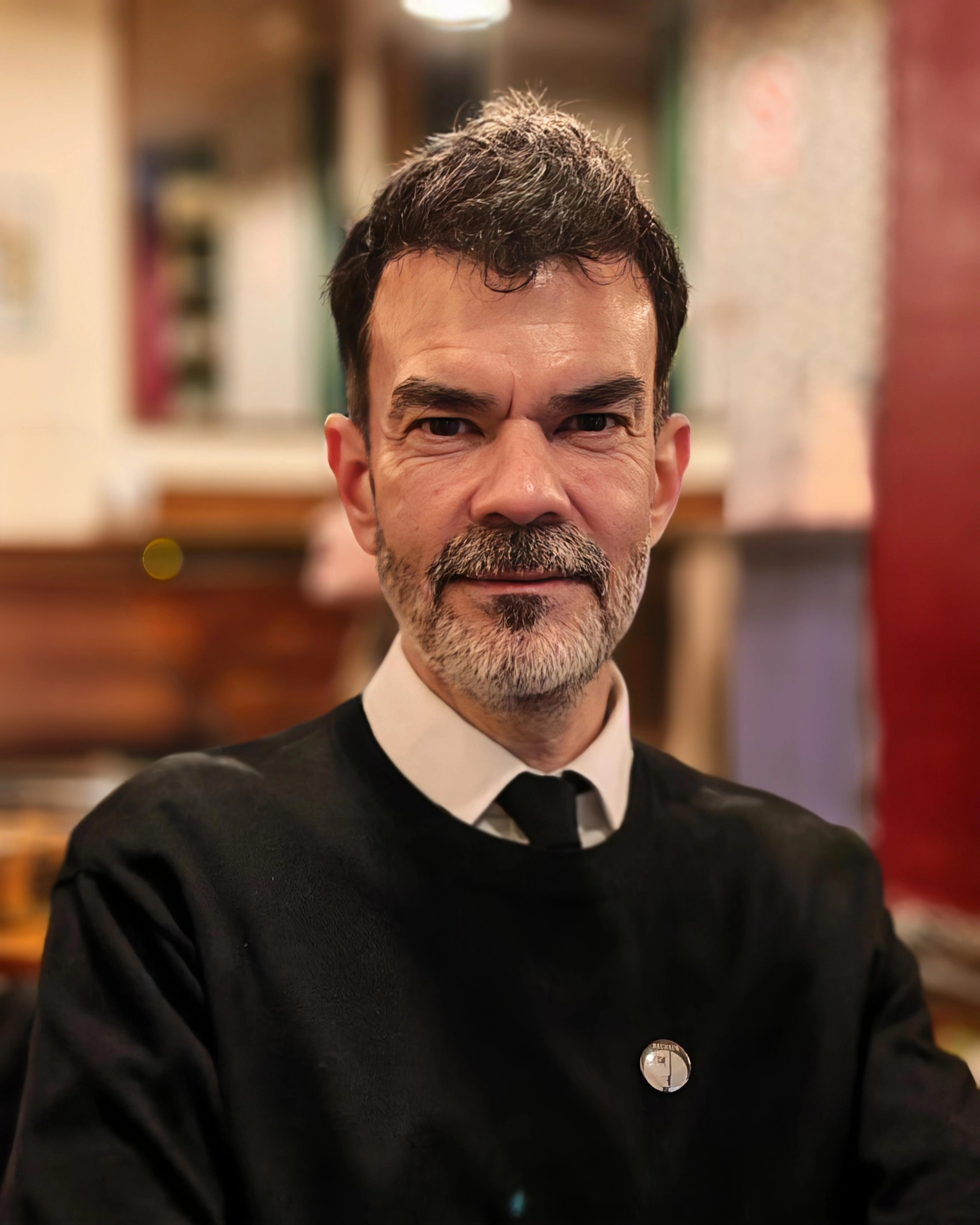
- Eduardo Sánchez Iglesias in January 2026

Coordinator of United Left of the Community of Madrid
- In office December 2012 – December 2014

Member of the Assembly of Madrid
- In office 19 February 2015 – 31 March 2015

Personal details
- Born: 1 September 1973 (age 52) Maracay, Venezuela
- Party: PCE
- Occupation: Economist, politician, researcher

Demetrio Eduardo "Eddy" Sánchez Iglesias (born 1973) is a Spanish politician and economist.

== Background ==
Sánchez was born on 1 September 1973 in Maracay (Venezuela), to a Cuban father and a Spanish mother. Sánchez moved to Spain when he was 14 years old. There he joined Comisiones Obreras (CC.OO.). He studied law at the University of Salamanca (USAL) and graduated in Political Science and Sociology at the Complutense University of Madrid (UCM).

== Political career ==
He ran 16th in the United Left of the Community of Madrid–The Greens (IUCM–LV) list for the 2011 Madrilenian regional election. As the candidature only. Retrieved 13 seats, he was not elected then a member of the regional legislature.

A member of the Communist Party of Spain (PCE), Sánchez, who had worked at the Assembly of Madrid as technician and as associate researcher for the UCM's Department of Applied Economy, was elected the Coordinator of United Left of the Community of Madrid (IU–CM) in December 2012. He handed in his resignation as Coordinator of IU–CM in December 2014, following the victory of Tania Sánchez in the party primaries to elect a candidate to challenge the Presidency of the Community of Madrid.

He became a member of the 9th term of the Assembly of Madrid on 19 February 2015, covering the vacant seat of María Espinosa de la Llave, who had precisely left the party along Tania Sánchez to pursue a different political project.
