= Podemos (Spanish political party) =

We Can Podemos
- General Secretary: Ione Belarra
- Spokesperson: Isabel Serra; Pablo Fernández Santos
- Founder: Pablo Iglesias Turrión
- Founded: 16 January 2014
- Headquarters: Calle Zurita 21, 28012 Madrid
- Think tank: Instituto República y Democracia
- Youth wing: Rebeldía Joven
- Ideology: Left-wing populism; Democratic socialism; Republicanism; Federalism; Non-interventionism
- Political position: Left-wing to far-left
- National affiliation: Unidas Podemos (2016–2023); Sumar (2023)
- European affiliation: European Left Alliance for the People and the Planet; Now the People !
- European Parliament group: The Left in the European Parliament
- Colours: Violet (Note: since 2022); Purple (Note: until 2022)
- Slogan: Sí se puede ('Yes, We Can')
- Congress of Deputies: 4 / 350
- Senate: 0 / 266
- European Parliament: 2 / 61
- Regional Parliaments: 9 / 1,248
- Regional Governments: 1 / 19

Election symbol

Website
- podemos.info

Podemos ([poˈðemos], lit. 'We Can') (Note: In other languages of Spain, the name of Podemos is as follows: Basque: Ahal Dugu [(a.)al du.ɣu]; Catalan: Podem [puˈðɛm, poˈðɛm]; Galician: Podemos [poˈðɛmʊs]) is a left-wing to far-left political party in Spain. Founded in January 2014 by the political scientist Pablo Iglesias Turrión as part of the anti-austerity movement in Spain, the party is currently led by Secretary-General Ione Belarra.

Podemos emerged in the context of the economic crisis at the start of the 2010s and the aftermath of the Spain's anti-austerity movement, which was protesting against inequality and corruption. A fast-growing movement, the party took part in the 2014 European Parliament election, winning almost 8% of the vote and five seats out of 54, outperforming the polls. The party would go on to participate in the 2015 and 2016 Spanish general election, becoming the country's third-largest political force, but underperforming against the PSOE in the battle for hegemony in the Spanish left.

On 9 May 2016, Podemos formed the Unidos Podemos electoral alliance with the United Left, Equo, and regionalist left-wing parties. After the fall of government talks with the PSOE after the April 2019 Spanish general election, the November 2019 Spanish general election, in which the party and its allies won 12.9% of the vote and 35 seats in the Congress of Deputies, resulted in the second government of Pedro Sánchez through a coalition government between Podemos and the PSOE, the first multi-party cabinet in the Spanish democratic era. The party participated in the Sumar coalition for the 2023 general election, but left it soon after.

== History ==
=== Background ===
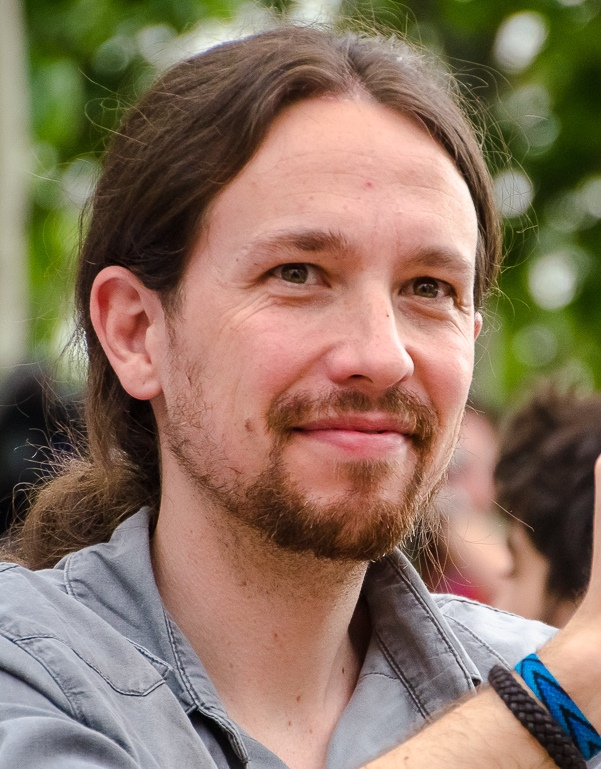
Pablo Iglesias Turrión, former leader and founder of Podemos, pictured in May 2015

Podemos emerged from the Indignados movement against inequality and corruption in 2011. The group was inspired by the populist leaders of Latin America's pink tide, which included Venezuela's Hugo Chávez and Bolivia's Evo Morales.

In January 2014, it released the manifesto Mover ficha: convertir la indignación en cambio político ("Move A Piece: Turn Indignation Into Political Change"), which was signed by thirty intellectuals and personalities, including Juan Carlos Monedero, Alberto San Juan, associate professor of political science at the National University of Distance Education (UNED) Jaime Pastor, the writer and philosopher Santiago Alba Rico, the former leader of the Left Trade Union Current Cándido González Carnero and Bibiana Medialdea, associate professor of applied economy at the UCM.

Podemos' manifesto stated that it was necessary to create a party list for the 2014 European Parliament election, intending to oppose the dominant policies of the European Union from the left. On 14 January, Pablo Iglesias Turrión, a professor of political science at the UCM and a TV presenter, was announced as the head of the movement. The movement was organised by the party Anti-Capitalist Left (Izquierda Anticapitalista), the Spanish section of the Trotskyist Fourth International, which had written the Mover ficha manifesto. One of the points highlighted by Iglesias was the derogation of the 135th article of the Constitution, which was made in 2011 by the major parties People's Party (PP) and Spanish Socialist Workers' Party (PSOE); full application of the 128th article of the constitution ("All wealth of the country in all its forms and no matter who owns it, is subordinated to the people's interest"); and maintaining abortion rights. They also demanded Spain's exit from NATO and supported the Spanish autonomous communities' right to self-determination.

=== Foundation ===
The Podemos movement was officially launched on 16 January 2014 in the Teatro del Barrio in the Lavapiés neighbourhood of Madrid, with a press conference attended by hundreds of people. The speakers at the launch included Pablo Iglesias, Juan Carlos Monedero, Teresa Rodríguez, psychiatrist and member of the Marea Blanca, Ana Castaño, Íñigo Errejón, and Miguel Urbán. The party's fundamental goal was to oppose the austerity policies of the government.

In order to run in the European elections of 2014, the members of the bare bones of Podemos set themselves three conditions: to receive the support of at least 50,000 people; that both the programme and the lists of candidates be prepared through open participation; and that unity be sought with other parties and movements of the left, such as United Left, the Popular Unity Candidacy, the X Party, the Andalusian Workers' Union, Anova and the citizens' mareas ("tides"). The 50,000 signatures were obtained in less than 24 hours, and the Podemos website crashed due to the high traffic.

In August 2015, Podemos endorsed Jeremy Corbyn's campaign in the Labour Party leadership election. The party's international secretariat released a statement that "In Podemos we share Jeremy Corbyn's view that another Europe is not just possible but necessary." It added: "Against the irresponsibility of the troika and the Eurogroup, against the Europe of financial lobbies and puppet representatives, a new democratic and social Europe is emerging, and Jeremy Corbyn's victory would be a great step in that direction."

=== 2014 European Parliament election ===
In the 2014 European Parliament election in Spain on 25 May, Podemos received 7.98% of the national vote, with 1,200,000 votes cast, electing five Members of the European Parliament (MEPs). Iglesias chose Dina Bousselham to lead his cabinet of advisors as an MEP.

El País described Pablo Iglesias Turrión as pessimistic about the outcome of the election: "We have lost these European elections. They have been won by the People's Party. We cannot be happy about this." He stated that his objective is to "move forward until we throw the PP and the PSOE out of power" and that "[w]e will now work with other parties from the south of Europe to make it clear that we don't want to be a German colony." Iglesias said Podemos MEPs would not take the standard MEP salary of more than €8,000 a month, stating that "not one of our MEPs will earn more than €1,930, an amount that's three times the minimum wage in Spain."

=== First party congress ===
On 5 June 2014, Pablo Iglesias Turrión announced that the Asamblea Ciudadana "Sí se puede" (Citizens' Assembly "Yes, It Can Be Done") would take place in the autumn. Iglesias also announced that a team of twenty-five people would be responsible for preparing the assembly, to be chosen in open elections in which anybody could participate, with closed lists, with no limit to the number of lists that could be presented. The vote took place over the Internet on 12 and 13 June. Two lists were presented, one headed by Iglesias and the other promoted by the Círculo de Enfermería ("Nurses' circle"). The technical details of the election and the deadlines generated discussion within Podemos. In a meeting of Podemos circles, which took place on 8 June in Madrid, the party's leadership faced significant criticism from many of its members for both the closed lists and the short deadlines, which allegedly led to fewer lists being presented. The electoral process in which 55,000 people participated gave the victory to Iglesias' list, with 86.8% of the vote.

A major part of the citizens' assembly involved the writing of documents defining the political and organisational principles of the party as well as resolutions the party would adopt. Any member of Podemos could present a document, and these would be adopted or rejected through a vote in which all members of Podemos participate. These documents would determine the structure of the party. Internal elections would then take place, again with the participation of all members of Podemos, to fill the positions defined by this structure.

The citizens' assembly held a meeting in Madrid on 18 and 19 October. On 19 October, Podemos membership was 130,000 and on 22 October it was 170,000.

The citizens' assembly adopted five resolutions, all of which were submitted by circles, based on the votes of Podemos members, each of whom could vote for five resolutions. The approved resolutions were on improving public education (45%), on anti-corruption measures (42%), on the right to housing (38%), on improving public healthcare (31%), and on auditing and restructuring the debt (23%).

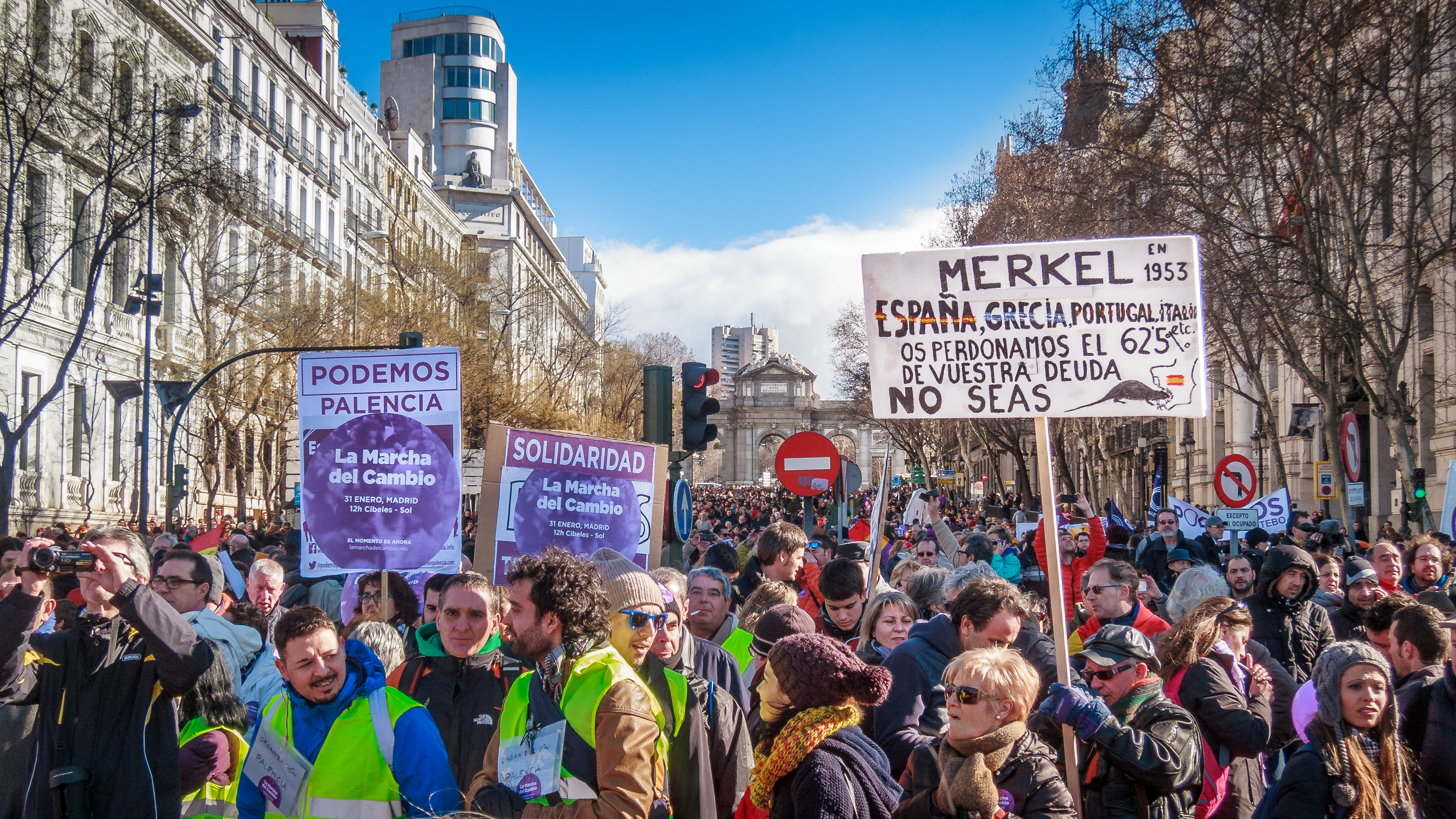
Podemos supporters in Madrid, 31 January 2015

The ethical, political, and structure documents proposed by the "Claro que Podemos", which included Luis Alegre, Carolina Bescansa, Íñigo Errejón, Pablo Iglesias, and Juan Carlos Monedero, were approved by 80.7% of the vote, surpassing "Sumando Podemos" 12.3% of the vote, promoted by the MEPs Pablo Echenique, Teresa Rodríguez, and Lola Sánchez in the vote for the structure document.

=== 2015 local elections ===
In October 2014, Podemos decided not to stand candidates in the 2015 Spanish local elections. Instead, it decided that its members would support local grassroots candidacies, where the so-called "mayors of change" were successfully elected: anti-evictions activist Ada Colau in Barcelona with Barcelona en Comú, former member of the General Council of the Judiciary Manuela Carmena in Madrid with Ahora Madrid, judge Xulio Ferreiro in A Coruña, doctor Martiño Noriega in Santiago, trade unionist Jorge Suárez in Ferrol, lawyer and activist Pedro Santisteve in Zaragoza with Zaragoza en Común, and teacher José María González "Kichi" in Cádiz with Adelante Cádiz.

=== 2015 general election ===
In the lead-up to the 2015 general election, Podemos adopted a pledge that, if the party won the election, it would hold a nationwide referendum on whether Spain should retain the Spanish monarchy or become a republic. The party also promised to increase public spending and ban job cuts in profitable firms.

At the 2015 general election on 20 December 2015, Podemos received 21% of the vote and became the third largest party in the parliament, with 69 out of 350 seats, the strongest performance for a third party in Spain since the Transition - with the previous one being 23 seats for the PCE in the 1979 elections. The party was the single most voted force in the provinces of Barcelona, Tarragona, Gipuzkoa, and Alava, while surpassing the Spanish Socialist Workers' Party also in Madrid, A Coruña, Pontevedra, Navarre, Castellón, Valencia, Alicante, Las Palmas, and the Balearic Islands.

=== Unidos Podemos ===
Following the failure of the 2015–2016 Spanish government formation negotiations to create a stable coalition government, on 2 May 2016, a second general election was called for June 2016. To contest the election, Podemos formed an electoral alliance with United Left, Equo, and regional left-wing parties, the official name being announced on 13 May 2016 as Unidos Podemos ("United We Can"). The coalition received 21.2% of the vote.

=== Andalucía ===
Podemos formed the Adelante Andalucía coalition with the left, the Greens, and Primavera Andaluza to contest the 2018 Andalusian regional election.

=== Sumar ===
In April 2023, Podemos declined to join the left-wing alliance with the new party Sumar because of differences over how candidates are selected. It was intended that these differences be resolved and negotiated on before Podemos would join the new alliance of left-wing parties for the upcoming general election scheduled for December 2023. Poor results for the ruling PSOE, Podemos, and other left-wing parties in the Spanish local and regional elections held on 28 May 2023 led to Prime Minister Pedro Sánchez calling for a snap general election, five months earlier than originally planned. This resulted in a speeding up of the negotiation process with Sumar. On 9 June, Podemos came to an agreement to run together with Sumar in the upcoming general elections just hours before the deadline for the registration of coalitions with the electoral authority. Podemos immediately came into conflict with Sumar and its leader, Yolanda Díaz, over the inclusion of Podemos candidates on the electoral lists. The main point of conflict was the supposed veto of Díaz over the prominent Podemos politician and Minister for Equality, Irene Montero, the wife of Podemos founder and former leader, Pablo Iglesias. Montero was not to be included on the Sumar list for the Madrid constituency. This move was widely condemned by the leadership and supporters of Podemos, with former leader Iglesias calling it "a political mistake"' and asking Díaz to rectify it; he stated that he found it hard in the situation to separate "the personal from the political". In addition, Podemos spokesperson in the Congress, Pablo Echenique, was also excluded from the lists. Ione Belarra, the General Secretary of Podemos, was placed fifth on the list for Madrid. In the election, Podemos won five seats in the Congress of Deputies, out of 31 for Sumar in total.

On 5 December 2023, Podemos announced that they had broken with Sumar, and its five MPs moved from the Sumar group to the mixed group in Congress.

== Ideology ==
A party on the left-wing or the far-left of the political spectrum, Podemos has been described as a left-wing populist party which holds anti-austerity, anti-corruption, and anti-establishment views. It promotes direct democracy, federalism, patriotism, republicanism, and an alternative social democracy to that of the Spanish Socialist Workers' Party (PSOE) through populist rhetoric.

Podemos presented a collaboratively written programme for the 2014 European Parliament election in Spain. Some of the most important policies were emphasis on public control, poverty reduction, and social dignity through a basic income for every adult, including lobbying controls and punitive measures against tax avoidance by large corporations and multinational organizations, as well as promotion of smaller enterprises. It also included revoking or curtailing the Treaty of Lisbon, abandoning the memorandum of understanding, withdrawing from multiple free trade agreements, and promoting referendums on any major constitutional reform. On environmentalism, it advocated reduction of fossil fuel consumption, promotion of public transport and renewable energy initiatives, reduction of industrial cash crop agriculture, and stimulating local food production by small and medium-sized enterprises.

=== Domestic politics ===
Podemos is opposed to the current parliamentary monarchy and wants to offer a referendum on its continuity, instead advocating for a federal, "plurinational" new republic. Furthermore, the party is supportive of direct democracy.

The party and its former leader (Pablo Iglesias Turrión) support the right to self-determination of autonomous communities like Catalonia and the Basque Country. The party has called for the release of jailed Catalan separatist leaders on trial in Spain's Supreme Court.

Podemos supported the exhumation of Francisco Franco.

=== Social issues ===
Podemos has been described as a progressive party. The party considers itself egalitarian, secularist, anti-racist, anti-fascist and environmentalist.

The party is strongly feminist and has advocated for feminism as a subject in schools. The party supports abortion being legal, even without parental consent. On the matter of prostitution, the party is split between abolitionists and those seeking to better regulate prostitution.

Podemos supports LGBT rights. The party is responsible for the Ley Trans, a law focused on gender self-determination and trans rights that has created a rift in the government.

Podemos supports the right to vote for immigrants, particularly Moroccans, as part of their "political rights", and the party has called for the regularisation of over half a million of illegal immigrants.

Podemos supports legalising and regulating cannabis in Spain. The party also supported the legalisation of euthanasia, which was legalised in Spain in March 2021.

=== Economy ===
Podemos opposes economic inequality and is opposed to capitalism, such as the neoliberal kind. The party wants to increase public spending and ban job cuts in profitable firms. It supports redistributive fiscal policies and a bigger welfare state. Podemos wants to regulate rental prices so they do not surpass 30% of the mean income. The party wants to increase the minimum wage.

The party supports a universal basic income (UBI) for everyone over 18 years of age in Spain. In January 2023, the party proposed the amount to be between €700 and €1,400 a month.

=== Environment ===
The party is opposed to climate change and wants to create laws against "energetic poverty".

=== Foreign policy ===
==== Defence ====
Podemos is opposed to any increases in military spending and supports the withdrawal from NATO of Spain.

==== European Union ====
Even though Podemos considers itself a pro-European party, it has repeatedly expressed disapproval with the current functioning of the European Union, with numerous sources and political analysts describing the party as taking an increasingly Eurosceptic stance. However, others consider it to be a pro-European party, and several academics have defined it as soft Eurosceptic. Podemos has called for a renegotiation of austerity measures and seeks to curtail the Treaty of Lisbon. It is also part of the European Left Alliance for the People and the Planet, a European political party that supports an alternative to capitalism.

==== Latin America ====
Podemos has been accused of having ties to Bolivarian Venezuela and the Chavismo. Since 2024, said accusations have made a comeback following the party recognising the results of the 2024 Venezuelan presidential election (accused of fraud by the Venezuelan opposition) by high-ranking members such as Irene Montero and Juan Carlos Monedero.

==== Africa ====
Podemos supports the right of self-determination for the Sahrawi people, seeking to establish high-level diplomatic relations between Spain and the Sahrawi Arab Democratic Republic and to expand the mandate of the United Nations Mission for the Referendum in Western Sahara so that "it acquires competencies in the protection and promotion of the civil, political, economic, social and cultural rights of the Sahrawi population". Podemos reiterated its support for a referendum of self-determination after Prime Minister Pedro Sánchez supported Morocco's autonomy proposal by presenting a motion in the Congress of Deputies together with ERC and EH Bildu that ended up being approved.

==== Middle East ====
Podemos has criticised Israel's Gaza war in the Gaza Strip. On 16 October 2023, in response to Israel's bombing and blockade of the Gaza Strip, Podemos leader Ione Belarra accused the EU and the United States of "being complicit in Israel's war crimes" and called for Israel to be denounced before the International Criminal Court because of what she identified as ongoing "planned genocide" in the Gaza Strip against the Palestinian peoples. In November 2023, Belarra called for sanctions on Israel and accused the European Commission of "hypocrisy".

== Organization ==
=== Leadership ===
==== Secretaries General ====
The Secretary General is the head and leader of the party.

| Secretary-General | | Time in office |
|---|---|---|
| 1. | Pablo Iglesias Turrión | 2014 – 2021 |
| 2. | Ione Belarra | 2021 – present |

==== Organizational Secretaries ====
The party's Organizational Secretaries are listed below.

| Organizational secretary | | Time in office |
|---|---|---|
| 1. | Sergio Pascual | 2014 – 2016 |
| 2. | Pablo Echenique | 2016 – 2019 |
| 3. | Alberto Rodríguez | 2019 – 2021 |
| 4. | Lilith Verstrynge | 2021 – 2024 |
| 5. | Pablo Fernández | 2024 – present |

=== Regional branches ===
The party has a regional branch for every single autonomous community in Spain. These include the following, among others:

- Podemos Andalusia
- Podemos Asturias
- Podemos Castile and León
- Podemos Euskadi
- Podemos Extremadura
- Podemos Region of Murcia

=== Membership ===
As of 2019, there are 523,000 members and 25,000 activists.

| Date | Membership (approx.) |
|---|---|
| 28 July 2014 | 0 |
| 17 August 2014 | 100,000 |
| 27 October 2014 | 200,000 |
| 29 December 2014 | 300,000 |
| 16 April 2016 | 400,000 |
| 23 May 2018 | 500,000 |

=== Alliances ===
Podemos has been a member of the following coalitions:

- Nationwide: Unidas Podemos (2016–2023), Sumar (2023).
  - Andalusia: Adelante Andalucía (2018–2021), Por Andalucía (since 2022).
  - Basque Country: Elkarrekin Podemos (since 2016).
  - Catalonia: Catalunya Sí que es Pot (2015–2017), Catalunya en Comú–Podem (2017–2021), En Comú Podem (2016–2024).
  - Galicia: En Marea (until 2019), Galicia en Común (2019–2023).
  - Valencian Community: És el moment (until 2016), A la valenciana (2016–2019).
- European Union: Unidas Podemos Cambiar Europa (2019–2024).

=== International affiliation and relations ===
Podemos is a member of The Left in the European Parliament, where the Greek party Syriza is also found, and whose former leader, Alexis Tsipras, has been supportive of Podemos. In May 2018, the party joined Now the People.

The party was said to allegedly have ties to Bolivarian Venezuela and the Islamic Republic of Iran;.

== Electoral performance ==
=== Cortes Generales ===
Cortes Generales
| Election | Leading candidate | Congress | | | Senate | | | Gov. |
| Election | Leading candidate | Votes | % | Seats | Votes | % | Seats | Gov. |
| 2015 | Pablo Iglesias | 5,212,711 | 20.7 (#3) | 69 / 350 | 12,244,416 | 18.5 (#3) | 16 / 208 | — |
| 2016 | Pablo Iglesias | Within Unidos Podemos | | 47 / 350 | Within Unidos Podemos | | 11 / 208 | No (Note: 2016–2018.) |
| 2016 | Pablo Iglesias | Within Unidos Podemos | | 47 / 350 | Within Unidos Podemos | | 11 / 208 | (Note: Confidence and supply (2018–2019).) |
| Apr. 2019 | Pablo Iglesias | Within Unidas Podemos | | 32 / 350 | Within Unidas Podemos | | 0 / 208 | — |
| Nov. 2019 | Pablo Iglesias | Within Unidas Podemos | | 26 / 350 | Within Unidas Podemos | | 0 / 208 | Yes |
| 2023 | Yolanda Díaz | Within Sumar | | 5 / 350 | Within Sumar | | 0 / 208 | (Note: Confidence and supply.) |

=== European Parliament ===
European Parliament
| Election | Leading candidate | Votes | % | Seats | EP Group |
| 2014 | Pablo Iglesias | 1,253,837 | 8.0 (#4) | 5 / 54 | GUE/NGL |
| 2019 | María Eugenia Rodríguez Palop | Within Unidas Podemos | | 3 / 59 | GUE/NGL |
| 2024 | Irene Montero | 578,007 | 3.3 (#7) | 2 / 61 | The Left |

== Public profile ==
=== Reception ===
The support obtained by the new formation after the European elections in 2014 resulted in multiple analyses and reactions. While some sectors welcomed the results, there were also expressions of concern. Pedro Sanchez, Secretary General of the Spanish Socialist Workers' Party (PSOE) since July 2014, branded Podemos as populist on numerous occasions at the beginning of his term while much of its electorate opted for the new party. The New York Times stated that "the party's 36-page campaign program reads like a wish list, with little detail about how it could be financed at a time when Spain is still struggling under a heavy debt burden." Vicente Palacio of Fundación Alternativas said that Podemos could have "very beneficial effects in terms of regenerating the Spanish democratic system", but is in danger of going "toward populism and demagogy, as has happened in the case of Beppe Grillo and his Five Star Movement in Italy."

The leader of Union, Progress and Democracy (UPyD), Rosa Díez, stated that similarities could be found with the Greek left-wing coalition Syriza, with the Five Star Movement of Beppe Grillo, and even with the French right-wing National Front of Marine Le Pen. The spokesman for the People's Party, María Dolores de Cospedal, said that poll results show a radicalisation of the left vote. Esperanza Aguirre, another prominent member of the People's Party, accused Pablo Iglesias of "being with the Castrismo, with Chavismo and ETA", which Iglesias responded to statements described as "slander" and announced he would consider legal action.

=== Funding controversies (2014–2015) ===
The leaders of Podemos also tried to distance themselves from the government of Venezuela following allegations of "murky" funding since many Podemos leaders were linked to Venezuela and other "revolutionary" governments in Latin America. Consulting work by several party members, including Iglesias, in leftist Latin American governments earned their consulting organisation, Center for Political and Social Studies Foundation (CEPS Foundation), €3.5 million, which helped fund their television debates. Juan Carlos Monedero, one of Podemos' founding members, received €425,000 for political consultancy work for Venezuela, Ecuador, Bolivia, and Nicaragua. Podemos called for an external auditor to observe accounts from February 2014 to December 2014, which showed that the total income from both private donations and state subsidies was estimated at approximately €947,000. Among the largest donors to the party were Podemos' own five MEPs, who donated €52,000 in 2014 from their salaries.

=== Relationship with the media ===
Since March 2015, journalists have been critical of the relationship between the political party and the traditional media. In March 2017, around a dozen Spanish journalists filed a complaint with the Madrid Press Association (APM), accusing Podemos of intimidating them because they published articles that were critical of the party. The Economist magazine has described the party as far-left.

=== Popular support ===
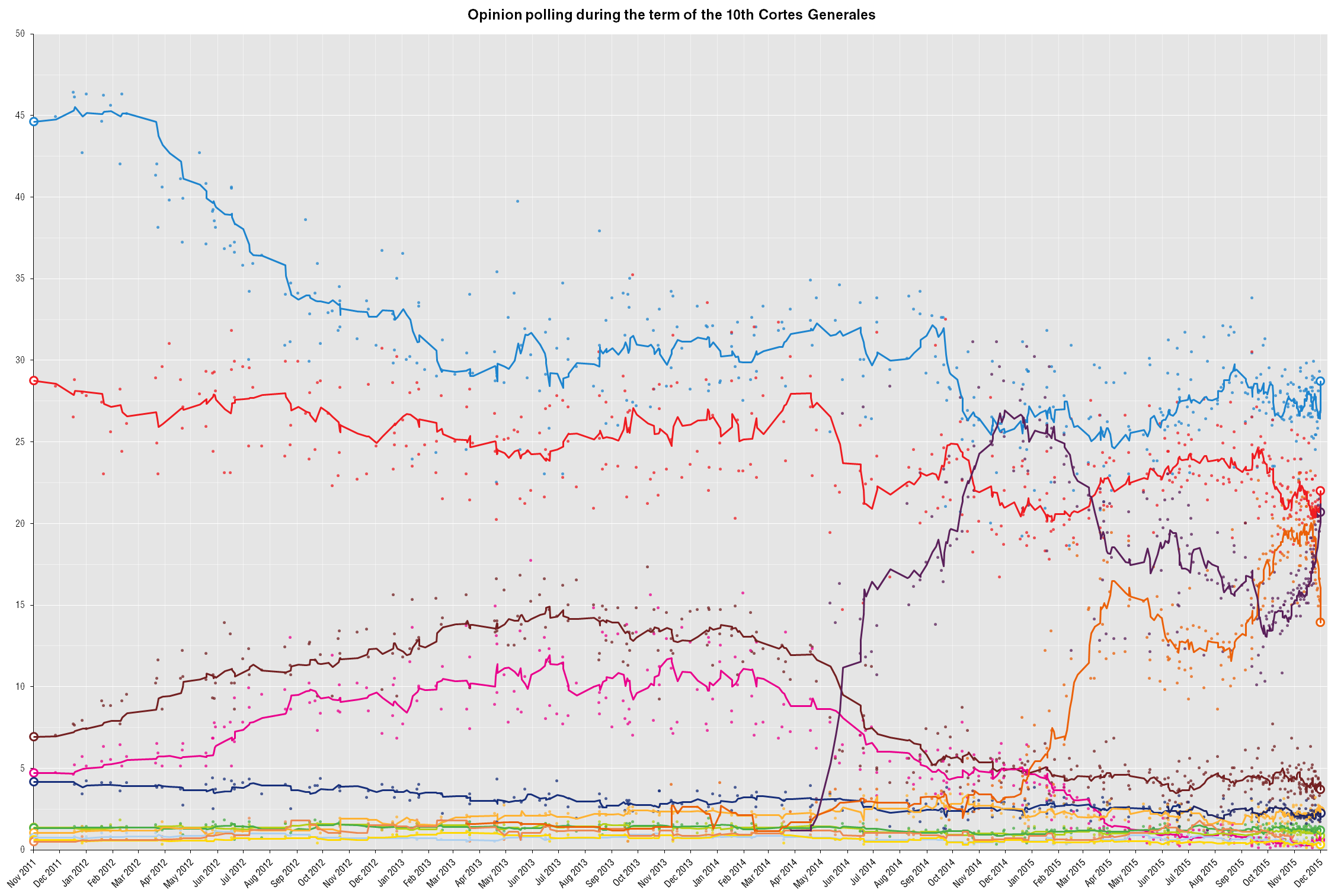
Opinion polling for the 2015 general election, which saw the rise of Podemos

According to GlobalPost, Podemos and other parties of the left have suddenly grown because of Europe's economic difficulties. Unemployment, especially among young Spanish adults, has created a positive sentiment towards Podemos and their appeal to the unsatisfied youth of Spain with an "irreverent style". Podemos also utilized its very-well run social media presence to its benefit to find popularity.

After it received the fourth-highest number of votes in the European elections, news related to the growth of Podemos started to be published. The hashtag Pablo Iglesias was the number 1 trending topic on Twitter in Spain the day after the elections; Iglesias also appeared on the front page of prominent Spanish newspapers. Before the elections, Podemos was already the most popular political force within social networks, but it had increased from 100,000 to 600,000 "Likes" on Facebook between May and July 2014. The CIS's quarterly survey, polling in July 2014 (two months after the elections), showed Podemos as the second most popular party regarding direct intention of vote, surpassing the PSOE; however, it remained 0.9% behind the PP. In late July, Podemos started to allow individuals to sign up, with 32,000 people registering as members in the first 48 hours through Podemos' website for free. In the first 20 days, Podemos already had approximately 100,000 members, becoming the third-largest Spanish party by membership, surpassing United Left (IU), Union, Progress and Democracy (UPyD), Convergence and Union (CiU), and Basque Nationalist Party (PNV/EAJ). In August 2014, Podemos already had 442,000 more "Likes" on Facebook than the "Likes" of the rest of the parties combined, having 708,763, with more than 2.6 million views on its YouTube channel. In September 2014, the interview of Iglesias in Viajando con Chester had almost 3 million viewers, being the most watched programme in its timeslot with 14.5% of the audience share. In October 2014, Iglesias' participation in La Sexta Noche (in which he was also interviewed) raised the audience share of the programme to 16,2%, which is its historical maximum. Iglesias' interview in Salvados also made the programme have its best ever audience, with a 23.8% and 5 million viewers. In late October, Podemos had more than 200,000 members. On 2 November 2014, El País published an opinion poll which gave Podemos a 27.7% approval rating, compared to PSOE's 26.2% and PP's 20.7%; and gave Podemos a direct intention of vote of 22.2%, compared to PSOE's 13.1% and PP's 10.4%. The party lost a considerable amount of support in the polls during the final months of 2015 when elections were approaching (sinking to 13%) whereas during the election campaign experienced a huge rise in support in the polls up to 20% of votes days before the election.

According to Politico Europe's Poll of Polls, Podemos has remained the fourth most popular party in Spain since the November 2019 Spanish general election. Podemos has polled, on average, at 11% according to the National Parliament voting intention.

== Bibliography ==
- Fernández-Albertos, José (2015) Los Votantes de Podemos: Del partido de los indignados al partido de los excluidos. Madrid: Libros de la Catarata.
- Ramiro, Luis; Gómez, Raúl (2016) Radical-left populism during the great recession: Podemos and its competition with the established radical left. Political Studies. org/10.1177/0032321716647400. doi:10.1177/0032321716647400.
- Rodríguez Teruel, Juan; Barrio, Astrid; Barberà, Oscar (2016) "Fast and Furious: Podemos' quest for power in multi-level Spain". South European Politics and Society. Taylor and Francis. doi: 10.1080/13608746.2016.1250397. Published online.
