= Instituto Español Severo Ochoa =

- French: Institut espagnol Severo Ochoa
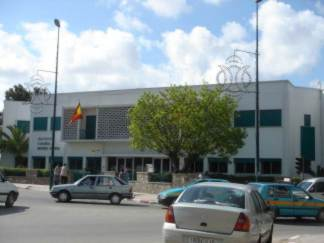

Location
- Tangier; Morocco
- 35.78094°N 5.82107°W

Information
- School type: International School
- Established: 1949
- Enrollment: 500 (2012)
- Language: Spanish
- Website: https://ieseveroochoa.educacion.es/

Instituto Español Severo Ochoa (French: Institut espagnol Severo Ochoa) is a Spanish international secondary school in upper-central Tangier, Morocco. Owned and operated by the Spanish Ministry of Education, it serves the obligatory secondary education (middle school) and bachillerato (senior high school/sixth form) levels of education in the upper level.

The school opened in 1949 after being created by the Decree of 1 February 1946. It was expanded and renovated in 1971. In the "Severo Ochoa" a multitude of activities are carried out that complement the educational tasks: two magazines are published – Kasbah and Babel – there is a theatre group and a choir, it has teams in many sports modalities, it organises literary competitions, film cycles, etc.

In the 2009-2010 academic year, it had more than 460 students in Compulsory Secondary Education and Baccalaureate, who were attended by 38 teachers. Most of the students are of Moroccan nationality, followed by those with Spanish nationality and then of other nationalities to complete 15 different nationalities.

As of 2012 500 Moroccans were enrolled in the school.

== Former students ==
- Dina Bousselham
