= Juan Carlos Monedero =

Spanish political scientist and writer (1963-)

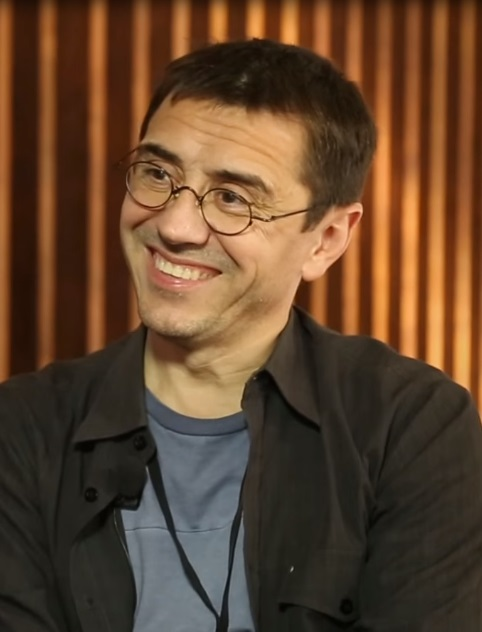
- Juan Carlos Monedero in a 2015 interview.
- Born: 12 January 1963 (age 63); Madrid, Spain
- Education: Doctorate in Political Science
- Alma mater: Universidad Complutense de Madrid
- Occupations: Writer, professor in the UCM
- Political party: Podemos (since 2014)
- Other political affiliations: United Left (1986–2014); Spanish Socialist Workers' Party (1982–1986)

Juan Carlos Monedero Fernández-Gala (born 12 January 1963) is a Spanish political scientist and writer. He is a professor at the Complutense University of Madrid and a host of La Tuerka. He was one of the leading members of Podemos until he resigned in April 2015.

== Academic career ==
Monedero studied economics, achieving a degree in political science and sociology in the Universidad Complutense de Madrid (UCM). He did his doctorate studies in the Heidelberg University (Germany) between 1989 and 1992, under the direction of political scientist Klaus von Beyme. His doctoral thesis, Causas de la disolución de la República Democrática Alemana. La ausencia de legitimidad: 1949-1989, was read in the UCM in 1996, with the qualification Apto Cum Laude.

Monedero has been a professor of political science at the UCM since 1992. He does research and teaches subjects related to political institutions, state theory, South America, and the Spanish political system. He has been an invited professor in various universities in Europe (London and Berlin) and South America (Argentina, Mexico, Colombia, Venezuela).

== Political consultant and analysis ==
Juan Carlos Monedero was a political advisor to Spanish politician Gaspar Llamazares from 2000 to 2005, when he was the General Coordinator of United Left. Monedero was also a consultant to the Venezuelan government led by Hugo Chávez between 2005 and 2010.

=== Media ===
Monedero has done media work in both print and television. He has published columns in newspapers such as Público, written articles in El País, and collaborated in political debate programmes such as La Tuerka and Fort Apache, presented by Pablo Iglesias. Monedero currently works with the newspaper La Marea, in CuartoPoder, and maintains a personal blog.

Monedero appeared in the 2001 comedy film Gente pez and the 2013 choral film Gente en sitios.

== Academic and political practice ==
Juan Carlos Monedero has critically defended the Bolivarian Revolution. He called Hugo Chávez "the last liberator of South America", and argued that the political process in South America is a positive example for a world immersed in a "systematic capitalist crisis".

Monedero is close to the 15-M movement, and some media outlets have classified him as its "ideological leader", although he says that nobody can hold such a position. Monedero's opinion about 15-M is that "it is the best thing that has happened to the democracy".

In January 2014, Monedero participated in the Podemos project with other activists and intellectuals such as Pablo Iglesias, seeking to unite left-wing forces in Spain against the current European political and financial system.

=== Funds ===
According to El Mundo, Monedero supposedly received up to €1.5 million from the Venezuelan Foundation of the Center for Political and Social Studies. This has caused controversy, with allegations that Monedero's tax records may have not included the alleged payments. In 2015 the Spanish Socialist Party (PSOE) demanded more details about the alleged payments from Venezuela to Monedero.

The veracity of these claims and the political motives of those making and publishing them has been questioned. In 2022 several audio recordings became known, implicating the former police commissioner José Manuel Villarejo, who is on trial for corruption, as well as two major Spanish media figures, Antonio García Ferreras and Mauricio Casals, in a conspiracy to defame Monedero and other political figures.

== Books ==
- Monedero, Juan Carlos (1992). El retorno a Europa. De la perestroika al Tratado de Maastricht. Madrid: Complutense. p. 429. ISBN 8474914469.
- Monedero, Juan Carlos; Paniagua Soto, Juan Luis (1999). En torno a la democracia en España. Problemas pendientes del sistema político espyearl. Madrid: Tecnos. p. 501. ISBN 8430933573.
- Monedero, Juan Carlos (2000). Informe sobre la implantación del euro en España. European University Institute: Badia Fiesolana.
- Monedero, Juan Carlos (2003). Cansancio del Leviatán: Problemas políticos en la mundialización. Madrid: Trotta. ISBN 8481646253.
- Monedero, Juan Carlos (2005). La Constitución destituyente de Europa: Claves para otro debate constitucional. Madrid: La Catarata. p. 160. ISBN 9788483192146.
- Monedero, Juan Carlos; El Troudi, Haiman (2006). Empresas de Producción Social. Instrumento para el socialismo del siglo XXI. Caracas. p. 238. ISBN 9801220252.
- Monedero, Juan Carlos (2009). Disfraces del Leviatán: El papel del estado en la globalización neoliberal. Madrid: Akal. p. 288. ISBN 9788446031307.
- Monedero, Juan Carlos (2009). Claves para un mundo en transición. Crítica y reconstrucción de la política. Madrid: Cyan. p. 74. ISBN 9788481988031.
- Monedero, Juan Carlos (2009). El gobierno de las palabras. Madrid: Fondo de Cultura Económica de España, S.L. p. 350. ISBN 9788437506548.
- Iglesias Turrión, Pablo; Monedero, Juan Carlos (2011). ¡Que no nos representan!: El debate sobre el sistema electoral español. Madrid: Popular. p. 127. ISBN 9788478845156.
- Monedero, Juan Carlos (2011). La rebelión de los indignados. Madrid: Rompeolas. p. 104. ISBN 9788478844975.
- Monedero, Juan Carlos (2011). La transición contada a nuestros padres. Madrid: La Catarata. p. 232. ISBN 9788483195857.
- Monedero, Juan Carlos (2012). Dormiamos y despertamos. El 15M y la reinvención de la democracia. Madrid: Nueva Utopía. ISBN 978-8496146594.
- Monedero, Juan Carlos (2013). Curso urgente de política para gente decente. Madrid: Seix Barral. p. 246. ISBN 9788432220814.
- Anguita, Julio; Monedero, Juan Carlos (2013). Conversaciones entre Julio Anguita y Juan Carlos Monedero. Madrid: Icaria. p. 120. ISBN 9788498885286.
