= Center for Political and Social Studies Foundation =

- Fundación Centro de Estudios Políticos y Sociales
- Abbreviation: CEPS Foundation
- Formation: 2001
- Headquarters: Valencia, Spain
- President: Alberto Montero Soler
- Vice President: Fabiola Meco Tébar
- Staff: 300+
- Website: www.ceps.es

Center for Political and Social Studies Foundation (Fundación Centro de Estudios Políticos y Sociales) is a socialist think tank that is headquartered in Valencia, Spain. The CEPS Foundation has been active in politics internationally, especially within countries in Latin America.

== History ==
=== Origin ===
In 1993, the Center for Political and Social Studies Foundation (CEPS) was founded in Valencia, Spain by left-wing academics that were supporters of Spanish Socialist Workers' Party.

== Staff ==
Staff for the CEP Foundation includes:

- President – Alberto Montero Soler
- Vice President – Fabiola Meco Tébar
- Executive Board – Luis Alegre Zahonero, Antonio de Cabo, Íñigo Errejón Galván, Pablo Iglesias Turrión, Adoración Guamán Hernández, Manolo Monereo, Alfredo Serrano Mancilla and Roberto Viciano Pastor

== Contributions ==
According to Jon Perdue, CEPS created a team of "Marxist constitutional scholars" to write the new constitutions of multiple countries in Latin America. The CEPS Foundation calls Latin America "the most interesting laboratory of political and social transformation" and their experiences in the region "can be useful for generating dynamic of social transformation in Europe".

=== Bolivia ===
==== 2009 Constitution of Bolivia ====
The contributions of the CEPS Foundation for the 2009 Constitution of Bolivia was mainly focused on the indigenous people of Bolivia.

=== Ecuador ===
==== 2008 Constitution of Ecuador ====
The 2008 Constitution was also partially attributed to CEPS, with Ecuadorean President Rafael Correa stating in a radio interview that he paid advisors $18,000 a month for their assistance.

=== Venezuela ===
==== 1999 Constitution of Venezuela ====
The CEPS Foundation contributed to the 1999 Constitution of Venezuela.

==== Political advising ====
According to the Venezuelan Ministry of Culture, the CEPS Foundation received $7 million for its advising services for the government of Hugo Chávez
