= Pablo Iglesias Turrión =

Spanish politician (born 1978)

Pablo Iglesias
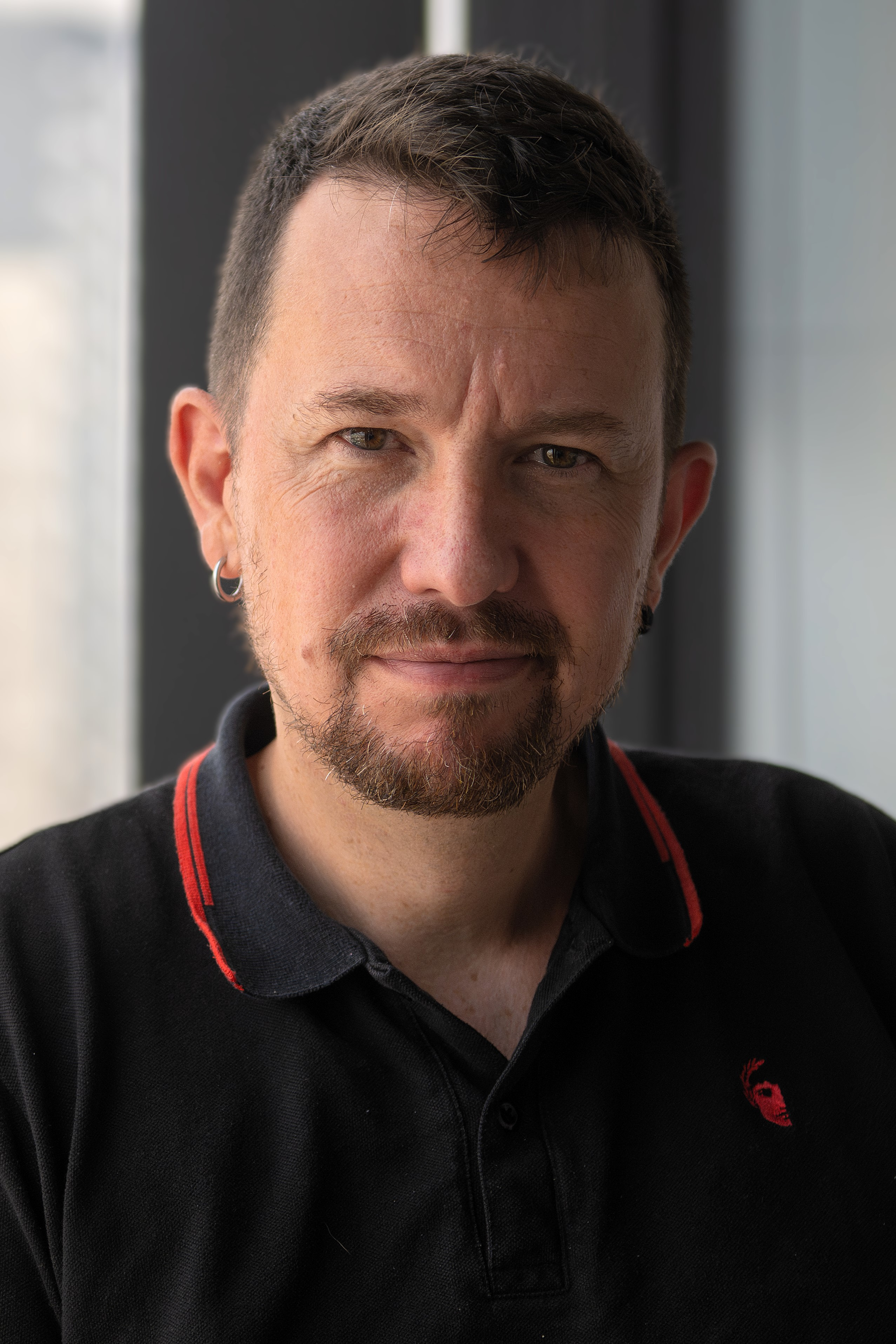
- Iglesias in 2025

Second Deputy Prime Minister of Spain
- In office 13 January 2020 – 31 March 2021 Serving with Carmen Calvo, Nadia Calviño and Teresa Ribera
- Monarch: Felipe VI
- Prime Minister: Pedro Sánchez
- Preceded by: Manuel Chaves (2011)
- Succeeded by: Nadia Calviño

Minister of Social Rights and 2030 Agenda
- In office 13 January 2020 – 31 March 2021
- Prime Minister: Pedro Sánchez
- Preceded by: María Luisa Carcedo (Health, Consumer Affairs and Social Welfare)
- Succeeded by: Ione Belarra

Secretary General of Podemos
- In office 15 November 2014 – 4 May 2021
- Preceded by: Position established
- Succeeded by: Ione Belarra

Member of the Congress of Deputies
- In office 13 January 2016 – 26 March 2021
- Constituency: Madrid

Member of the European Parliament
- In office 1 July 2014 – 27 October 2015
- Constituency: Spain

Personal details
- Born: 17 October 1978 (age 47) Madrid, Spain
- Party: Podemos (since 2014)
- Other political affiliations: Communist Youth Union of Spain (1992–1999)
- Domestic partner(s): Tania Sánchez (2008–2015); Irene Montero (since 2017)
- Children: 3
- Education: Complutense University; Charles III University; European Graduate School

Pablo Iglesias Turrión (Spanish pronunciation: [ˈpaβlojˈɣlesjas tuˈrjon]; born 17 October 1978) is a Spanish political scientist and former politician. During his political career, he served as Second Deputy Prime Minister and as Minister of Social Rights and 2030 Agenda of the Government of Spain from 2020 to 2021. He also served as Member of the Congress of Deputies from 2016 to 2021, representing Madrid. Iglesias is a co-founder of Podemos, a far-left political party that he led from 2014 until his resignation in 2021.

Before then, he was a lecturer in political science at the Complutense University of Madrid and TV host. He was elected to the European Parliament in the 2014 elections as the leading candidate of the newly created Podemos. On 15 March, he announced that he would be stepping down from the government to run in the Unidas Podemos list for the 2021 Madrilenian regional election, leaving politics shortly after Unidas Podemos' poor performance at the ballots.

== Biography ==
=== Family and early life ===
Pablo Manuel Iglesias Turrión was born on 17 October 1978 in Madrid, (Note: Always known as "Pablo", he formally dropped his second name "Manuel" in 2015, after he began to be derisively addressed in public as "Pablo Manuel" by some PSOE politicians.) the son of Luisa Turrión, a lawyer for the trade union CCOO (and daughter of the historic PSOE member Manuel Turrión de Eusebio), and Javier Iglesias, a labour inspector and retired history teacher, and, according to Iglesias, former member of the Revolutionary Antifascist Patriotic Front. (Note: Pablo's paternal grandfather Manuel Iglesias Ramírez was sentenced to death in Francoist Spain, but the sentence was not carried out because the accusations against him were proven to be false.) Iglesias was named Pablo after Pablo Iglesias, a labour movement leader who founded the Spanish Socialist Worker's Party (PSOE) in 1879.

Moving to Soria with his family at the age of two, Iglesias was raised in the latter provincial capital until he was 13 years old, studying in CP Numancia, Infantes de Lara and Las Pedrizas. After his parents separated, he went back to Madrid with his mother, settling in Vallecas, where he became a member of the Communist Youth when he was 14. A member of the Global Resistance Movement by the turn of the century, he then took part in anti-globalization protests extolling civil disobedience.

From 1996 to 2001 Iglesias studied law (with an average grade on his student record of 7.3/10) at the Complutense University of Madrid and then Political Science (2004), in which he got the best record of his class, an average of 9.22, 13 Honours and he was awarded the Extraordinary Prize of Degree. He studied at the University of Bologna as part of the Erasmus programme. Aside from Spanish, he speaks English and Italian. (Note: He is also studying French.)

=== Post-graduate activities ===
In 2003, he started a TV show on Tele K (a grassroots TV station from Vallecas): La Tuerka, that was later broadcast by Público TV.

Iglesias also earned the teaching certificate (2004), DEA (2005) and PhD (2008).

His doctoral dissertation under the supervision of Heriberto Cairo Carou dealt with civil disobedience of the anti-globalization movement in early 21st-century Spain and Italy and it was titled Multitud y acción colectiva postnacional: un estudio comparativo de los desobedientes: de Italia a Madrid (2000-2005). Iglesias has also obtained a Master of Humanities (2010, honours) from Charles III University with a thesis regarding a political analysis of cinema, and a Master of Arts in Communication (2011, distinction) from the European Graduate School in Switzerland, where he studied political theory, cinema and psychoanalysis.

Since the early-2000s, Iglesias was involved with the Center for Political and Social Studies Foundation (CEPS) and spent a time in the executive board of the organisation. During the 2000s, Iglesias was involved in Latin American politics for the CEPS Foundation and monitored elections in Paraguay and Bolivia while acting as a strategic analysis advisor for the government of Venezuela and as a consultant for the government of Bolivia.

He worked as acting senior lecturer of political science at the UCM, where he was named honorary professor in September 2014. He defended in 2008 his dissertation, which was supervised by Heriberto Cairo Carou, and whose subject was collective political action in post-millennial political history. Since 2002, he has published more than 30 articles in academic journals. He has also written articles in media such as Público, Kaosenlared, Diagonal and Rebelion.org.

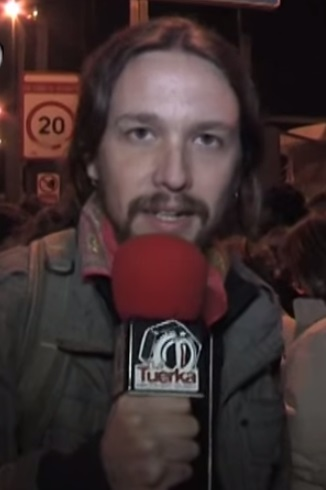
Iglesias in 2012, working as field reporter for La Tuerka

In 2012, he was hired by United Left's Yolanda Díaz to work as political advisor vis-à-vis the electoral campaign for the 21 October Galician regional election, in which Díaz ran as candidate of the Galician Left Alternative platform.

In January 2013, the broadcasting of Fort Apache was started; the TV show, produced by 360 Global Media and CMI and funded by the Iranian government's HispanTV, featured from 2013 to 2019 a weekly discussion on hot political subjects moderated by Iglesias.

On 25 April 2013, Iglesias was invited to the political talk show El gato al agua (Intereconomía) as panelist. This marked a breaking point, as the doors to mainstream media opened for Iglesias (until then mostly known in restricted circles), gaining a certain public visibility. He became a regular of TV political shows, featuring in El cascabel al gato (13TV), La Sexta Noche (La Sexta), Las Mañanas de Cuatro (Cuatro) and La Noche en 24 Horas (24 Horas).

In October 2013, he was given the "Enfocados" prize by the Department of Journalism and Audiovisual Communication of the Universidad Carlos III of Madrid for his contribution to social change, which he shared with Ignacio Escolar and Jordi Évole in the individual category.

=== Creation of Podemos ===
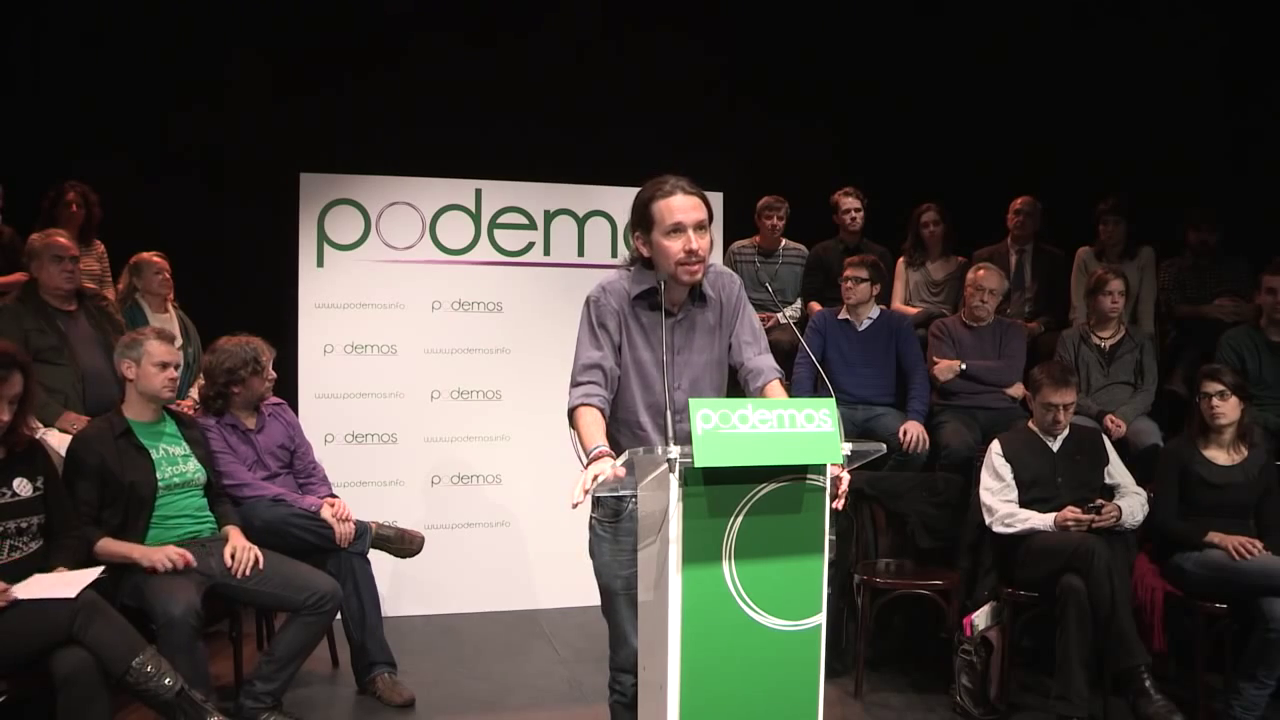
Iglesias intervening in the presentation of Podemos on 16 January 2014

By late 2013, after an informal dinner at Raúl Camargo's residence, which Iglesias, Miguel Urbán, and Jorge Moruno attended, the idea of launching a platform for the 2014 European Parliament election began to take form. According to Iglesias, he already had the name Podemos in mind, inspired by the homonymously named Tuto Quiroga's Bolivian right-wing platform PODEMOS; the name combined the ideas of 'Power' (poder) and 'Democracy' (democracia).

Days after the issuing of the Mover ficha: convertir la indignación en cambio político ("Moving the counter: converting indignation into political change") manifesto on 14 January 2014, Iglesias presented, along with other people and groups, the Podemos movement, intending to run in the European election. He was elected to lead the list of Podemos (just registered as political party) in open primary elections. His face was used as logo on the ballot paper as he was better known than the party by that time.

He was then elected to the European Parliament, as the party earned 5 seats at the election. On 25 June 2014, GUE/NGL, the European Parliament group Podemos joined, elected him as its proposed candidate for the presidency of the European Parliament. As an MEP, Iglesias served in the Committee on Foreign Affairs, the Subcommittee on Human Rights and in the vice-chair of the Delegation for relations with Mercosur. He was also a substitute for the Subcommittee on Security and Defence and the Committee on Agriculture and Rural Development. He named Dina Bousselham to be the head of his cabinet of advisors.

Iglesias became the host of Otra vuelta de tuerka, a new TV show featuring an interview by Iglesias of a public figure; it was inaugurated on 6 October 2014, with a talk between Iglesias and Jesús Cintora. Broadcast until 2020, through the years Iglesias interviewed more than 150 individuals, including the likes of Thomas Piketty, Toni Negri, Manuel Castells, Baltasar Garzón, Dilma Rousseff, Owen Jones, Ahed Tamimi, Guilherme Boulos, Nancy Fraser or José Luis Rodríguez Zapatero.

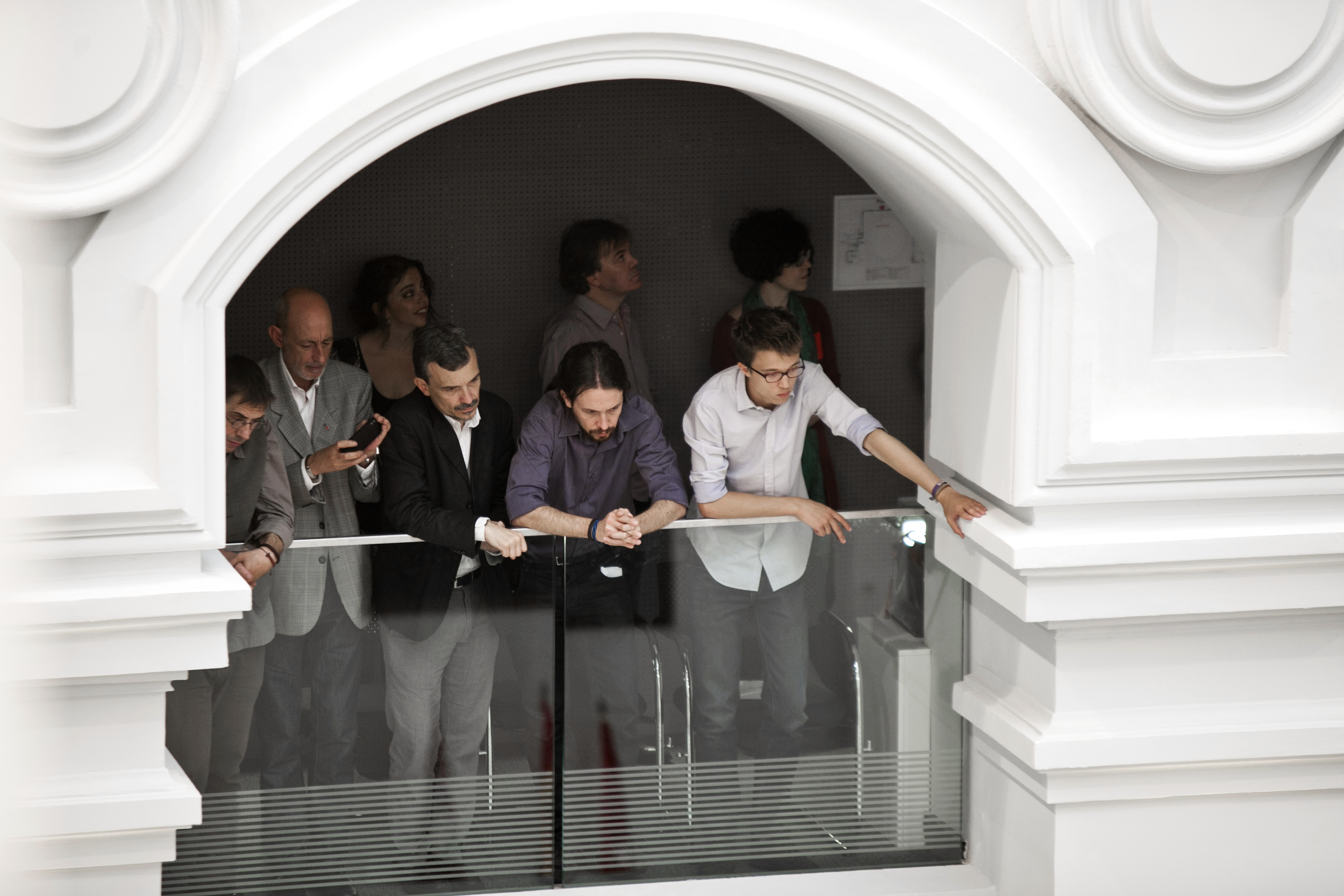
Juan Carlos Monedero, Jesús Montero, José Manuel López, Pablo Iglesias and Íñigo Errejón attending the investiture of Manuela Carmena as Mayor of Madrid on 13 June 2015

On 15 November 2014 Iglesias became the first Secretary-General of Podemos, after commanding the support of 88.6% of the registered party members who took part in the voting, ending the two-month long Yes We Can Citizen Assembly (Vistalegre I) that defined the party's organizational structure and elected the party cadres.

In March 2015, Iglesias and Tania Sánchez jointly announced the breakup of their domestic partnership; they had been roughly three years together.

Following the results of the May 2015 local elections, and the ensuing success of the lists tacitly endorsed by Podemos in the big cities, Iglesias deemed the new municipal governments in Madrid and Barcelona, presided by Manuela Carmena and Ada Colau respectively, as models in order to "start the (political) change" in the country.

=== Failed sorpasso ===
On 27 October 2015, Iglesias resigned his seat in the European Parliament in order to focus on the campaign for the 2015 Spanish general election.

Iglesias ran first in the Podemos in Madrid for the Congress of Deputies election; Podemos earned 44 seats; forming a parliamentary group with the addition of the legislators elected with En Comú Podem and En Marea; gathering 69 deputies, the new group became the third biggest group in the Lower House. On 15 February 2016, Podemos (along En Comú Podem and En Marea) delivered to PSOE a proposal intending to agree on the government formation with PSOE, but PSOE deemed some of the points as unacceptable; on 30 March, after meeting Pedro Sánchez, Iglesias make public he would renounce to enter government if that were to smooth the negotiations for the investiture of Sánchez as prime minister, while also declaring he was open to the prospect of meeting Albert Rivera, leader of Citizens (4th largest group in Congress), that had already reached a tentative agreement with the PSOE.

After the absence of any investiture, on 3 May 2016 a new general election was called for 26 June. A few days later the journalists Eduardo Inda (Okdiario's chief editor) and Antonio García Ferreras accused Iglesias of allegedly having received illegal funding from the Venezuelan government via a tax haven. The report on which the information was based (whose authorship has been tracked to the so-called "patriotic police" set up by Minister Jorge Fernández Díaz and that included as payment order fake evidence elaborated through clippings taken out of the Internet), led to many headlines in the Spanish press for months although it led to nowhere as evidence. 2022 a talk between the former police officer José Manuel Villarejo and the journalist Ferreras from back then was leaked, in which Ferrara himself says he thinks the report is fake, but will still report it.

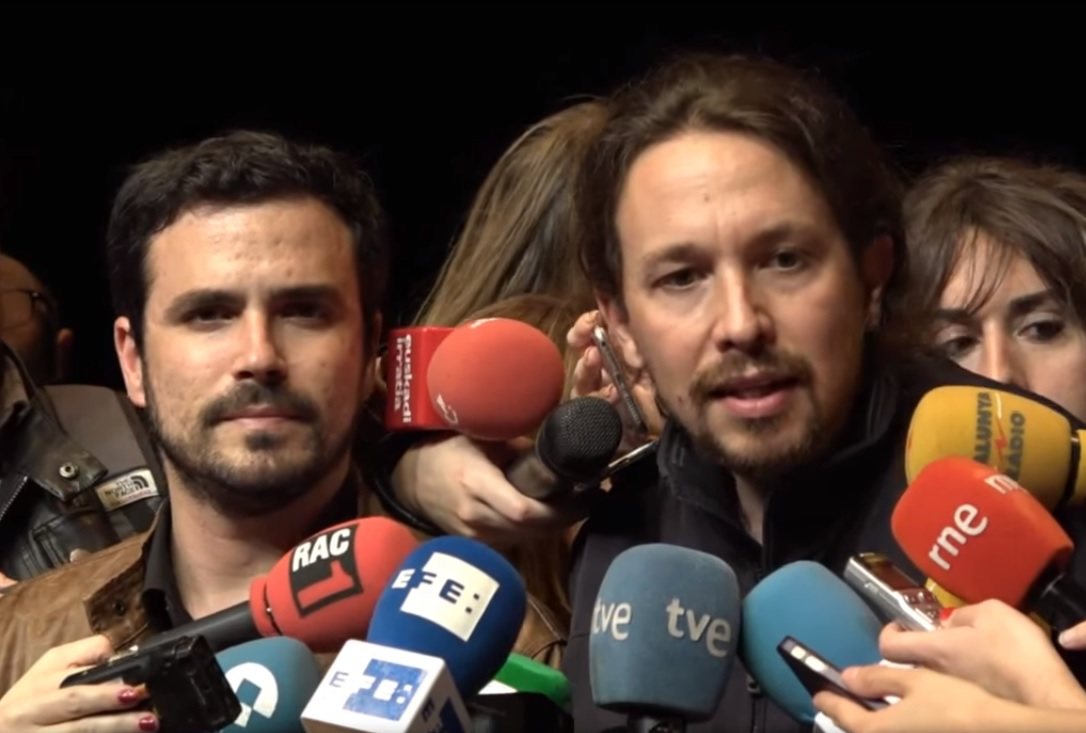
Iglesias and Alberto Garzón in 2016 after reaching a deal for the coalition of Podemos and IU for the 2016 general election, the "pacto de los botellines"

On 9 May 2016 Pablo Iglesias and Alberto Garzón (Coordinator-General of IU), announced and agreement vying for an electoral alliance between Podemos and IU vis-à-vis the upcoming general election; this agreement came to be known as the pacto de los botellines. The coalition was named Unidos Podemos and Iglesias ran 1st in the Madrid list. The seats of Unidos Podemos, plus those of En Comú Podem, En Marea and Compromís amounted to 71, and the Unidos Podemos-En Comú Podem-En Marea Confederal Parliamentary Group stood as third political force in the Lower House. The results of the 2016 election brought a breaking point in Podemos as both Iglesias and Íñigo Errejón deemed the results of the election largely as a strategical failure, but because of different interpretations; Iglesias in particular thought the strategy of transversality endorsed by Errejón had shown its limits (conversely Errejón blamed it precisely on the tight alliance with IU).

From December 2016 to February 2017 the 2nd Citizen Assembly of Podemos ("Vistalegre II") took place. Pablo Iglesias bid to repeat as Secretary-General of the party, winning in the leadership vote in which the only challenger he faced was Juan Moreno Yagüe (89% vs. 10,9%). In addition, his platform also imposed over that of Errejón in the voting of the composition of the Podemos State Council and some party papers, and thus his grip on the party strengthened.

In April 2017, Iglesias and Podemos tabled a censure motion against the PP government due to a series of corruption scandals of the governing party. The other opposition parties refused to support it, and the motion failed, with only 82 votes in favor against 170 opposed and 97 abstaining. As no-confidence motions in Spain are constructive, Iglesias designated himself as replacement candidate for Prime Minister in the event his motion succeeded in toppling Rajoy.

In May 2018, Iglesias and his domestic partner Irene Montero put their positions in Podemos up for a vote of confidence due to an internal controversy over their purchase of a €600,000 house in Galapagar outside Madrid; some party members saw the purchase as contrary to the party's beliefs. The vote of confidence in their positions passed with 68.4% of members voting in their favour. Due to this incident, the right wing media nicknamed the couple "the marquises of Galapagar".

In May 2018, just after the Audiencia Nacional delivered the sentence condemning the People's Party as participant of the Gürtel corruption scheme "on a lucrative basis" and the ensuing filing PSOE parliamentary group of a vote of no confidence in the Prime Minister Mariano Rajoy for 1 June 2018, Iglesias announced that shall the latter motion fail Podemos would file another one just for the purpose of immediately calling for a new general election; this move has been attributed to the will to force the 'yes' vote of the MPs of the Basque Nationalist Party (in principle hostile to new elections and favouring abstention instead); the 'yes' votes of the Basque MPs ultimately determined the success of the motion.

Following the results of the April 2019 Spanish general election (that delivered a plurality to the PSOE in the Congress of Deputies) and the subsequent proposal of Pedro Sánchez as Prime Ministerial candidate by the King, tasked with searching supports for his investiture, Iglesias faced the negotiations between the PSOE and Podemos regarding the investiture vowing for some Podemos politicians to enter the Council of Ministers in a number relative to the PSOE proportional to the votes of each party. Even if on 19 July 2019, Iglesias made clear his personal presence at the Council of Ministers was not to be an excuse not to form a government, dropping any pretense of becoming a minister, the negotiations with the PSOE vis-à-vis the portfolios entrusted to Podemos politicians ultimately failed, and Sánchez could not pass his first investiture in July 2019.

=== Cabinet member ===
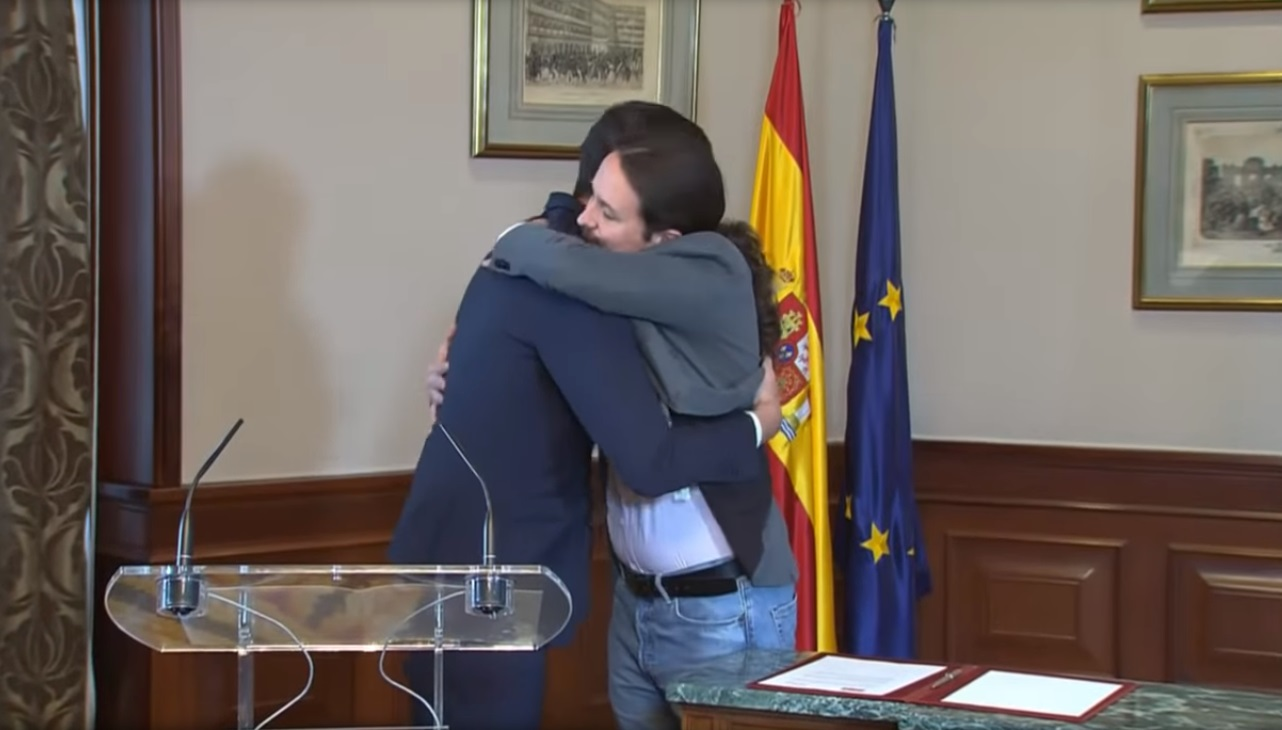
Iglesias and Sánchez hugging after the announcement of a tentative agreement for a "progressive" government (Palacio de las Cortes, 12 November 2019)

Following the results of the November 2019 Spanish general election, on 12 November 2019 Pedro Sánchez and Iglesias announced a preliminary agreement between PSOE and Unidas Podemos to rule together. The successful investiture of Sánchez as prime minister in a second round vote ensued on 7 January 2020.

Appointed as Second Deputy Prime Minister and as Minister of Social Rights and 2030 Agenda in the Sánchez II Government, he took office along the rest of the ministers in the cabinet on 13 January 2020. The protocol, established for the smooth functioning of the coalition government, signed by PSOE and Podemos envisaged Iglesias quitting the role of host in TV shows such as Otra vuelta de tuerka and Fort Apache when he became Deputy Prime Minister. Iglesias chose Podemos local leader in Madrid and former Chief of Defence Staff Julio Rodríguez to be his chief of staff, while he opted for Nacho Álvarez and Ione Belarra as Secretaries of State in the Ministry.

=== 2021 Madrilenian regional election and retirement ===
On 15 March 2021, Iglesias announced that he planned to resign from cabinet to lead his party in the 2021 Madrilenian regional election. His seat in the Cortes Generales was taken by Mercedes Pérez Merino.

On 22 April 2021, Unidas Podemos revealed that Iglesias had received a letter containing a death threat and several bullets. Similar threats had been sent to Interior Minister Fernando Grande-Marlaska and director of the Guardia Civil María Gámez. During a regional election debate the next day, Vox candidate Rocío Monasterio stated that she believes these threats weren't real. Accusing her of normalising political violence, Iglesias walked out of the debate, as did PSOE's Ángel Gabilondo and Más Madrid's Mónica García. President of Madrid Isabel Díaz Ayuso, a member of the People's Party, later published and deleted a tweet endorsing Monasterio's statements.

Podemos performed poorly in the election, placing fifth with 7.2% of votes, only a small increase. The overall result was a dramatic victory for the People's Party, whom Vox pledged to support. After the announcement of the results, Iglesias announced he would resign from his offices and retire from politics. He stated he had been turned into "a scapegoat" who "mobilizes the worst of those who hate democracy." He and his family had been also the target of daily harassment in his residence.

=== Post-political life ===
After his retirement from politics, Iglesias returned to his work as a presenter and commentator in the media. In November 2022, he announced the start of a fundraising campaign for the launch of a leftist television channel, which would be called Canal Red. The channel began its broadcasts through the internet on 6 March 2023.

== Views and stances ==
He is an admirer of the Italian Communist Party and Antonio Gramsci, and is interested in the party strategy of Palmiro Togliatti and the theoretical work of Antonio Negri. (Note: He has declared that, politically, he is "Italian", adding that "my political mind was made in Italy".) At the Vistalegre II party congress in 2017, Iglesias represented one of the two proposals within Podemos—sometimes portrayed as a "traditional left-wing" (Iglesias) vs "classic populist strategy" (Errejón)—that clashed during the event: Iglesias' stance was to strengthen the current Podemos-United Left alliance whereas Errejón argued that this alliance locked the party too much into a radical-left identity. (Note: He had nonetheless derided the old IU cadres, declaring in June 2015: "keep on living in your existential pessimism. Stew in your own juice full of red stars and stuff, but don't approach (us), because you are precisely the (individuals) responsible for nothing being changed in this country. You are killjoys ("cenizos"). I don't want political killjoys, people who have been unable to do anything in 25 years. I don't want political leaders from IU (and I have worked for them, they are unable to read the political situation) to approach us.)

In August 2015, Iglesias endorsed Jeremy Corbyn's campaign in the Labour Party leadership election (Note: "We salute and support him," he told reporters. "The fact that at this moment Jeremy Corbyn is the favourite to win... and make a 180-degree turn from the direction set out by Tony Blair shows how much things are changing across Europe." Iglesias added: "A different Labour Party that returns to its origins as a representative of the popular classes is, I believe, very important.")

In 2014, at a Chavez tribute in November 2014, Iglesias, wore a red shirt, which represents the political ideology of Chavismo, with the Eyes of Chavez printed on the shirt. He has expressed support for the Venezuelan Bolivarian government several times and praised the policies of Hugo Chávez. In December 2018, he disavowed some of his earlier comments and said "the political and economic situation in Venezuela is disastrous". During the 2019 Venezuelan presidential crisis, Iglesias said the Spanish government and the European Union "must defend international legality, not a coup d'état". He said US president Donald Trump and his allies were acting to secure Venezuela's oil for themselves and "are not interested in democracy and human rights in Venezuela". (Note: Despite this, during the 2019 Venezuelan presidential crisis, Iglesias argued, in what it was considered a defense of Nicolás Maduro, that the Government of Spain and the EU "should defend international legality, instead of a coup", also arguing that neither Donald Trump nor his allies "were interested in democracy and human rights in Venezuela".)

Iglesias is a prominent republican, saying that a "new republic would be the best guarantee of a united Spain built on a foundation of respect and freedom to decide". He is not religious, but says he finds himself in agreement with many of Pope Francis's views.

== Controversies ==
In 2016, private messages between Iglesias and Juan Carlos Monedero were leaked in which Iglesias wrote: "I would whip Mariló Montero until she bled... that is the B-side of the national popular, a somewhat perverse Marxist turned into a psychopath." Montero denounced him for his words.

In 2018 Iglesias and his domestic partner and Minister of Equality of Spain Irene Montero were accused of hypocrisy after purchasing a villa worth 600,000 euro in a suburb of Madrid. Critics recalled that in 2012 Iglesias criticized conservative Prime Minister Mariano Rajoy's then economy minister Luis de Guindos for buying a luxury home. This clashed with their political message, described as "We are like you, we are from worker's neighborhoods, we wear jeans, we ride the metro".

== Electoral history ==
Electoral history of Pablo Iglesias
Election	List	Constituency	List position	Result
European parliament election, 2014	Podemos	Spain	1st (out of 54)	Elected
Spanish general election, 2015	Podemos	Madrid	1st (out of 36)	Elected
Spanish general election, 2016	Unidos Podemos	Madrid	1st (out of 36)	Elected
Spanish general election, April 2019	Unidas Podemos	Madrid	1st (out of 37)	Elected
Spanish general election, November 2019	Unidas Podemos	Madrid	1st (out of 37)	Elected
Madrilenian regional election, May 2021	Podemos-IU	Madrid	1st (out of 136)	Elected

== Works ==
Author

- — (2009). Multitud y acción colectiva postnacional. Madrid: Universidad Complutense de Madrid, Servicio de Publicaciones.
- — (2011). Desobedientes. De Chiapas a Madrid. Madrid: Editorial Popular.
- — (2013). Maquiavelo frente a la gran pantalla. Cine y política. Akal.
- Diario Red

Coauthor

- Iglesias Turrión, Pablo; Monedero, Juan Carlos (2011). ¡Que no nos representan!: El debate sobre el sistema electoral español. Madrid: Popular.
- Iglesias Turrión, Pablo; Romero Laullón, Ricardo (2013). Abajo el Régimen. Conversación entre Pablo Iglesias y Nega LCDM. Icaria.

Editor

- Iglesias Turrión, Pablo; Espasandín, Jesús, eds. (2007). Bolivia en Movimiento. Acción colectiva y poder político. Madrid: El Viejo Topo.
- Iglesias Turrión, Pablo, ed. (2013). Cuando las películas votan. Lecciones de ciencias sociales a través del cine. Catarata.

=== Podcast ===
- "La Base" video podcast via Publico: https://www.publico.es/publico-tv/la-base
- "La Base" video podcast via Canal Red: https://www.youtube.com/@canalredtv/playlists

Political offices
New office	Second Deputy Prime Minister of Spain; 2020-present	Incumbent
Preceded by María Luisa Carcedo as Minister of Health, Consumption and Social Welfare	Minister of Social Rights and 2030 Agenda; 2020-present	Incumbent
Party political offices
New office	Secretary General of Podemos; 2014–present	Incumbent
