= Eduardo Haro Tecglen =

Spanish journalist (1924–2005)

Eduardo Haro Tecglen (1924 – 2005) was a Spanish journalist, writer and theatre critic.

Born in Madrid, he studied at the Official School of Journalism where he graduated in 1943. After having been the Paris correspondent for Informaciones and El Correo Español-El Pueblo Vasco, from 1968 to 1980 he was the deputy editor Triunfo. In 1978, he became the theatre critic for El País, publishing a daily column until his death.

With his editorials in Triunfo, together with other leading journalists who criticised the Spanish State in the journal, such as its founder, José Ángel Ezcurra, Enrique Miret Magdalena, José Monleón, and later Luis Carandell and Manuel Vázquez Montalbán, he helped Triunfo become one of the leading intellectual journals and one of the leading symbols of resistance to Francoist Spain.

Although some critics, including the author Javier Marías (who accused him, and José Luis López Aranguren and Camilo José Cela of not accepting their responsibilities for their earlier "pro-Fascist actions or writings") of "collaborating" with Francoist Spain, based on his having been associated with the Falange in his youth, the reality was that he had done so in order to commute his father's death sentence - to a 30-year prison sentence.

He signed the articles he wrote in Triunfo about international politics using his own name, while those he wrote about history, he signed using the pen-name "Juan Aldebarán", and the articles about science and the future, he signed "Pablo Berbén". He also wrote a weekly column about daily life, signed "Pozuelo".

The homage to him, held at the Teatro Español, a few days after his death, was attended by, among others, the founder of Triunfo, José Ángel Ezcurra; the journalist Fernando Delgado; the former and current editors of El País, Juan Luis Cebrián and Joaquín Estefanía, respectively; the president de PRISA, Jesús de Polanco; the actors Diego Galán and Núria Espert, and the then mayor of Madrid, Alberto Ruiz-Gallardón.

The actor Francisco Rabal dedicated the copla "Hijo del siglo" to Haro Tecglen.

== Publications ==
- 1996: El niño republicano (Alfaguara, Madrid)
