= Carlos Mendo =

Spanish journalist (1933–2010)

Carlos Mendo (26 June 1933 – 23 August 2010) was a Spanish journalist. In 1972, Mendo co-founded El País, Spain's most widely circulated daily newspaper.

Born in Madrid, Mendo began his career in journalism in 1958 when he joined the Spanish news agency, EFE. He later left EFE in order to join United Press International (UPI). He became United Press International's first correspondent in Rome, Italy, before becoming UPI's Spain bureau chief.

In 1965, Mendo rejoined EFE as a managing director. He oversaw much of EFE's expansion until his second departure in 1969.

Mendo was hired by PRISA publishing group, where he became part of the team that founded and launched El País in 1972. The newspaper's other co-founders at PRISA included José Ortega Spottorno, Jesús de Polanco, and Juan Luis Cebrián. Although El País is considered a leftist publication, Mendo was a conservative. He remained active at El País after the newspaper was founded, including a stint as a reporter in Washington, D.C. In 1979, Mendo became the newspaper's London correspondent.

Carlos Mendo died on 23 August 2010 at the age of 77, after several weeks in hospital.
