= Ignacio Polanco =

Spanish businessman

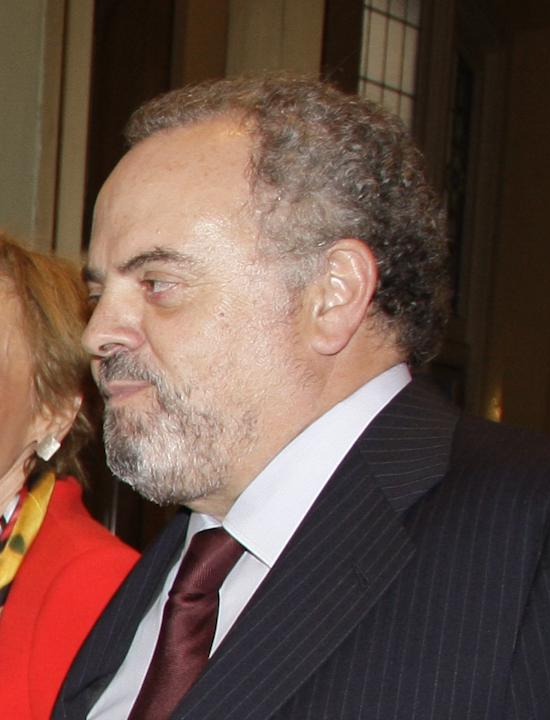
Ignacio Polanco

Ignacio Polanco Moreno (born Madrid, 5 November 1954) is president of the Spanish media conglomerate PRISA, as well as Timón, S. A. and Promotora de Publicaciones, S. L., companies with majority capital ownership of PRISA.

With a degree in economics from Complutense University of Madrid and an MBA from the Instituto de Empresa of Madrid, he has grown his career with Timón and PRISA. He was president of Grupo Santillana publishing house until 2000, and in June was named deputy president of PRISA. In November 2006 he was designated vice-president, then president in 2007 following the death of his father, Jesús de Polanco.

Within PRISA he is president of El País, Unión Radio and La Cadena SER, and also sits on the Board of Directors of Sogecable.
