= Bashir Eskandari =

- بشیر اسکندری
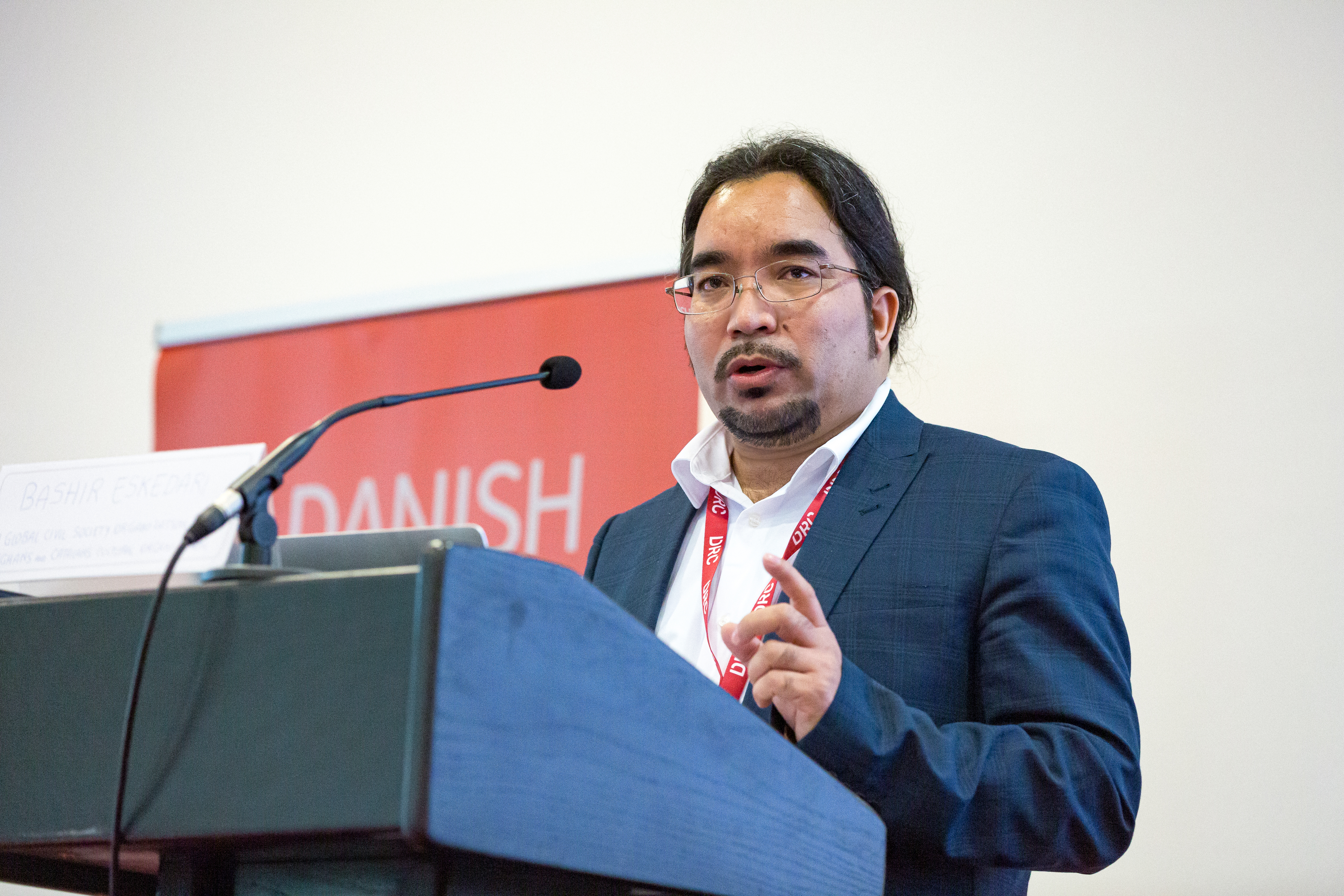
- Eskandari speaking at the European conference Diaspora Action for Afghanistan in Brussels, 2022
- Born: 15 March 1983 (age 43); Ghazni, Afghanistan
- Education: Autonomous University of Barcelona
- Occupations: Poet and human rights activist

Bashir Eskandari (born 15 March 1983 in Ghazni, Afghanistan) is an Afghan-Spanish poet, writer and human rights activist based in Barcelona, Spain.

== Biography ==
He left Afghanistan with his family and spent periods in Iran, Turkey and Greece before settling in Spain in 2010.

He studied international relations at the Autonomous University of Barcelona. His undergraduate thesis, Gender Apartheid: Examining the Status of Women in Taliban-Dominated Laws, was deposited in the university's digital repository in 2024.

== Public career ==
Eskandari has worked in the field of human rights, particularly on issues concerning refugees and the Afghan community in Europe.

According to Casa Asia, Eskandari has been based in Barcelona since 2010 and has been involved in supporting migrants, including interpretation, guidance and social integration services, with particular attention to the Hazara community.

According to El Mundo, Eskandari described the physical and psychological consequences of violence he experienced during his childhood in the context of the Afghan conflict.

According to Voice of America, Eskandari has spoken about the situation of Afghan refugees in Spain, including difficulties in finding housing and employment and the physical and psychological effects of violence suffered in Afghanistan.

Catalan regional outlets, including Regió7 and the ACN news agency, have described Eskandari as the president of the Afghan and Catalan Cultural Association. Their reports have also featured his concerns about people at risk in Afghanistan and the persecution of minority communities, including the Hazara.

Eskandari was a keynote speaker at the European conference Diaspora Action for Afghanistan, organized by the Danish Refugee Council in Brussels in 2022.

According to Público, Eskandari was among representatives of Afghan associations who met with a senior Spanish Foreign Ministry official in January 2025 to raise concerns about the situation of Afghan women and other vulnerable members of the community.

== Literary activity ==
In his 2026 poem Sueño prohibido, he addresses the oppression of women under the Taliban regime.
