= Cinemanía =

Spanish language monthly film magazine

- Categories: Film magazine
- Frequency: Monthly
- Publisher: Cinemanía Magazine, S.L.
- Founded: 1995
- First issue: 1 October 1995; 29 years ago
- Company: Grupo Henneo
- Country: Spain
- Based in: Madrid
- Language: Spanish
- Website: Cinemanía

Cinemanía is a monthly film magazine based in Madrid, Spain. It has been in circulation since 1995.

== History and profile ==
Cinemanía was first published in October 1995. The magazine is headquartered in Madrid. It was part of Prisa Revistas, a subsidiary of PRISA company. It was published by Promotora General de Revistas, S.A and comes out monthly.

In 2018, Cinemanía was acquired by Grupo Henneo.

Cinemanía covers both Spanish movies and international ones. It also features interviews, reports and reviews.

Cinemanía was redesigned in May 2002 and in October 2005.
