= Antonio Caño =

Spanish journalist (born 1957)

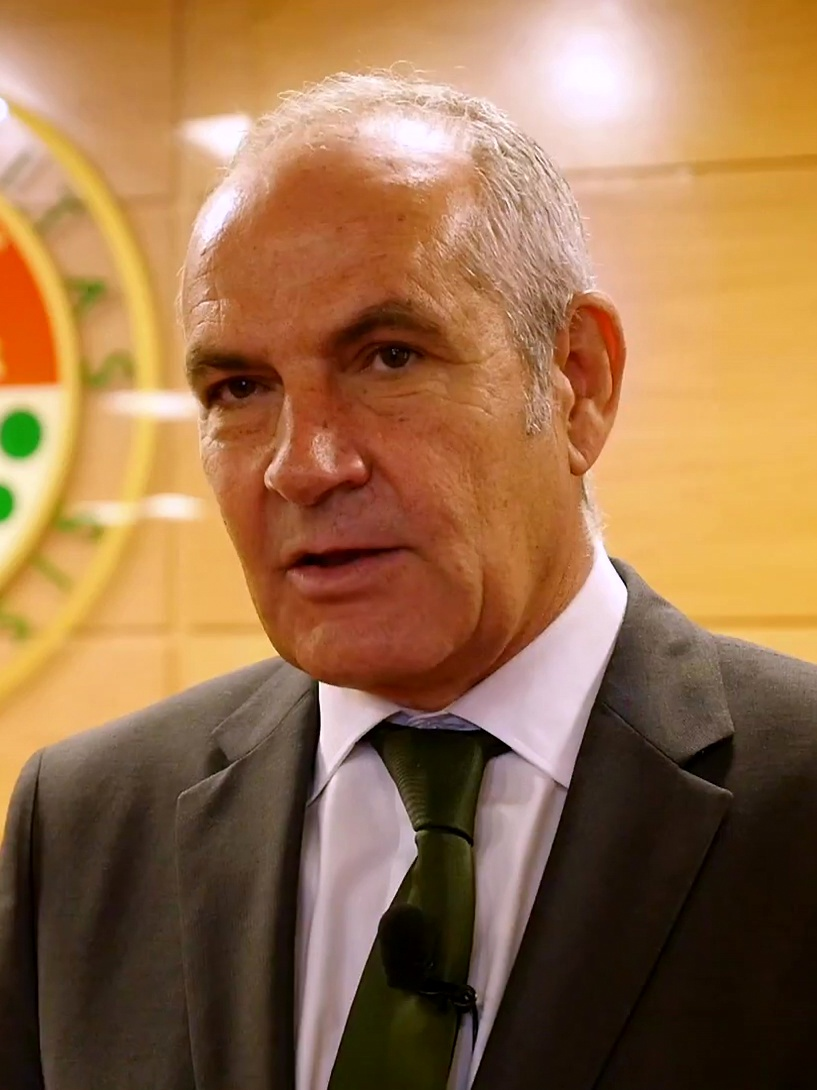
- Born: 30 March 1957; Martos
- Occupation: Journalist
- Employers: EFE; El País
- Awards: Medal of Andalusia (2017)

Antonio Caño Barranco (born 1957) is a Spanish journalist. He was the editor of El País from 2014 to 2018.

== Biography ==
Caño was born in 1957 in Martos. After a brief spell working for the Agencia EFE, he joined El País at a young age, working at the newspaper's international area. A correspondent in Mexico and the United States, he was responsible for the editions for the Americas.

He was appointed editor-in-chief of El País on 4 May 2014, at the 38th anniversary of the newspaper. A protegè of Juan Luis Cebrián, El País founder and former editor-in chief, during his 4 year spell as editor, the newspaper's editorial line experienced a further swing towards right-leaning positions, at odds with the chiefly left-leaning readership base of the newspaper in Spain. By early 2018, after a steady decline in sales, his removal from the position of editor was reported; this was interpreted as an attempt to cater to the newspaper's traditional readership. Soledad Gallego-Díaz was announced as his successor in June 2018, in what it was interpreted as a left swing of the editorial line.
