= Simone Ortega =

Spanish culinary author

- Born: Simone Ortega Klein; May 29, 1919; Barcelona, Spain
- Died: July 2, 2008 (aged 89); Madrid, Spain
- Occupation: Writer
- Writing career
- Language: Spanish
- Genre: Non-fiction
- Subject: Food

Simone Ortega Klein (29 May 1919 – 2 July 2008) was a bestselling Spanish culinary author. Born in Barcelona to a family originally from Alsace in France, she published her first and bestselling book 1080 recetas de cocina (republished in English as 1080 Recipes) in 1972. She was married to publisher José Ortega Spottorno, son of famous philosopher José Ortega y Gasset and founder of the Spanish daily newspaper El País, until he died in 2002.

Her bestselling book, 1080 recetas de cocina (1080 Recipes) has sold over 3.5 million copies in Spain since it was first published, and as of 2007 it was on its 48th updated edition there. In 1987 she was awarded the Spanish Special Prize for Gastronomy, following this in 2006 with the Spain Food Awards Special Prize. In awarding the latter prize, the jury spoke of "an entire lifetime dedicated to advising and teaching consumers about good cooking and good cuisine, with special emphasis on the quality of national products". 2006 also saw the French government bestow the Order of Arts and Letters on Ortega at a special ceremony in Madrid, at which Ortega commented that ""More than anything else, the cuisine is what has brought France and Spain closer together".

Aside from writing cookbooks, Ortega had a regular column in ¡Hola!, and was a frequent guest on various radio programmes. Her later books were written in collaboration with her daughter, Inés Ortega Klein, who has followed in the footsteps of her mother to become something of a celebrity chef and cookbook author.

== Publications ==
First US English edition of 1080 recetas de cocina, Phaidon Press.

1080 Recipes has been translated into English, Dutch and other languages. In collaboration with her daughter, Ortega released two separate English language editions of 1080 Recipes: one for the United Kingdom and the other for the United States, to reflect the ease with which customers in each country can get hold of certain products.

Some of her books are:

- 1080 recetas de cocina published in 1972 (English: 1080 Recipes)
- Nuevas recetas de cocina (1984) (New Recipes)
- Quesos españoles (1987) (Cheeses of Spain)
- La cocina de Madrid (1987) (The Madrid Kitchen)
- El libro de los potajes, las sopas, las cremas y los gazpachos (1988) (The Book of Stews, Soups, Creams and Gazpachos)
- Las mejores recetas de Simone Ortega (1990) (The Best Recipes of Simone Ortega)
- El Libro de Los Platos de Cuchara (2004) (The Book of Dishes Eaten with a Spoon: Stews, Soups, Creams and Gazpachos) (in collaboration with her daughter)
- Spain: The Cookbook Phaidon Press, 2017. ISBN 978-0-7148-7247-6. (US Edition).

== See also ==
- Spanish cuisine
- Phaidon Press publishers of the English 1080 Recipes
