= Destiny Kosiso =

Spanish footballer (born 2014)

Personal information
- Full name: Destiny Kosiso Ejiofor
- Date of birth: 2014 (age 11–12)
- Position: Forward

Team information
- Current team: Barcelona

Youth career
- Years: Team
- Barcelona

Destiny Kosiso Ejiofor (born 2014) is a Spanish footballer who plays as a forward for Barcelona.

== Early life ==
Kosiso was born in 2014. Of Nigerian descent through his parents, he has two older brothers.

== Career ==
As a youth player, Kosiso joined the youth academy of La Liga side Barcelona. At the age of twelve, Kosiso signed a sponsorship contract with American sporting apparel brand Nike.

== Style of play ==
Kosiso plays as a forward. Spanish newspaper Diario AS wrote in 2026 that "his playing style, physique, and powerful shot are reminiscent of [France international Kylian] Mbappé".
