= Jaume Roures =

Spanish businessman and film producer

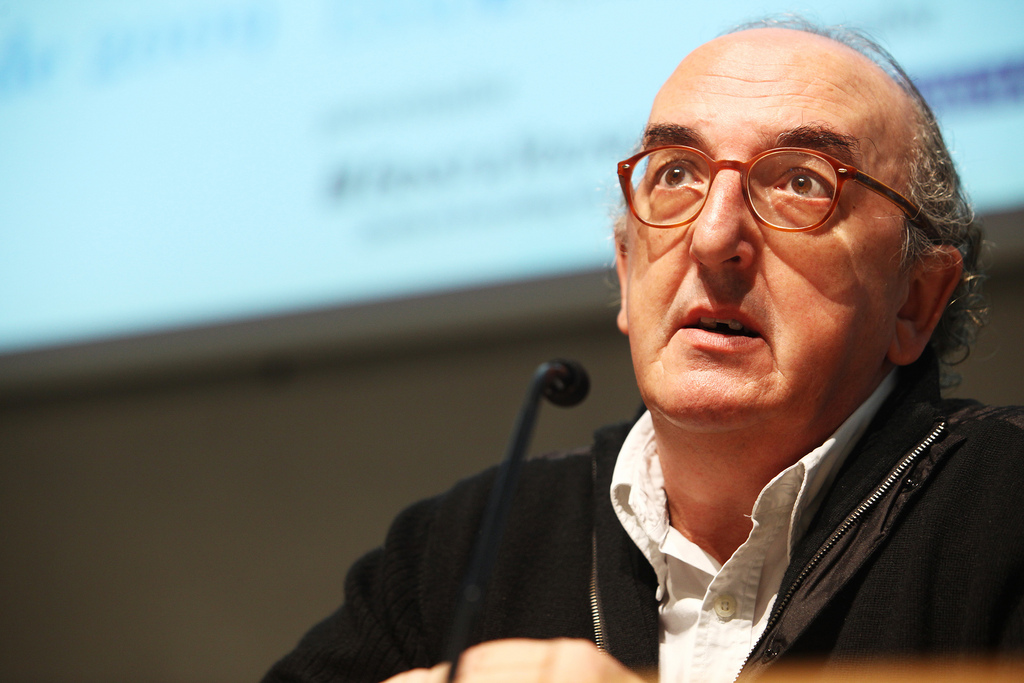
- Roures in 2009
- Born: 8 September 1950 (age 75); Barcelona, Spain
- Occupation(s): Businessman, film producer, political activist and media mogul
- Known for: CEO of Mediapro; Founder of Público

Jaume Roures Llop (born 8 September 1950) is a Spanish businessman, film producer and media mogul from Catalonia. Roures is best known as the founder of the newspaper Público and as the CEO of the media group Mediapro. Considered a left-wing nationalist, he was a member of Trotskyist and Anti-Francoist organizations in his youth.

== Early life ==
Born in Barcelona in 1950, Roures was a member of clandestine anti-francoist organizations such as Comisiones Obreras (CC.OO.), the Workers' Front of Catalonia (FOC) and the Trotskyist Revolutionary Communist League (LCR).

Arrested during the Francoist dictatorship, he spent time imprisoned in the Barcelona's Cárcel Modelo from 1969 to 1971 as a political prisoner.

Roures began a career as sports journalist in TV3—the Catalan public television channel created in 1983—serving for eight years at the helm of the Department of Sports' News and Productions.

== Mass media businessman ==
Roures founded the production company Mediapro, primarily employed at its beginnings by the Canal+'s sports productions and the newscast services of Canal Sur.

In 2005, Gestora de Inversiones Audiovisuales La Sexta obtained the last of the DTT licenses granted during the government of José Luis Rodríguez Zapatero. Mediapro had a stake in Grupo GAMP (the primary shareholder of the company, the other one being, at the time, Televisa). The related TV channel, LaSexta, begin to broadcast in March 2006.

By means of the publisher 'Mediapubli, Sociedad de Publicaciones y Ediciones S.L.' (created in February 2007), Roures and other partners such as Tatxo Benet and Gerard Romy launched the daily newspaper Público, which published its first issue on 26 September 2007. Vowing to draw disenchanted left-wing readers away from El País, the print version of Público was successively edited by Ignacio Escolar, Félix Monteira and Jesús Maraña. Despite having achieved a substantial readership growth from 2008 to 2012, at the height of 2011 it had become apparent that the business model (with a heavy indebtedness) was not viable, and the company filed a layoff affecting a 20% of the workforce in 2011.

Having filed for receivership on 3 January 2012, Roures and his partners resolved to close the print edition of Público on 24 February 2012. A group of 20 former Mediapubli employees continued publishing the online version without support from the publisher. However, on 23 May 2012, the receiver granted the print and online Mediapubli properties to Display Connectors S.L, a company created in February 2012 and participated by Roures and other Mediapubli people.

As of 2019, he held a 12% stake in Mediapro, primarily owned by Chinese company Orient Hontai Capital.

In 2020, Roures promoted the launch of the think-tank 'Institut Sobiranies'.

In October 2023, the board of Mediapro determined the exit of Roures as managing partner of the company, reportedly at request of majority shareholder Southwind Group and minority shareholder WPP.

== Views ==
Roures is considered a left-wing nationalist. He claims to preserve the ideological views from his youth. Roures has stated that he is in favour of the right to self-determination of the peoples. Despite claiming to have voted CUP in 2012, he has declared not to be pro-Catalan independence.

== Filmography ==
Producer

- Mondays in the Sun (2002)
- Love in Self Defense (2004)
- My Quick Way Out (2005)
- Princesas (2005)
- Salvador (2005)
- The Silly Age (2005)
- Va a ser que nadie es perfecto (2006)
- Camino (2008)
- Sexykiller (2008)
- Map of the Sounds of Tokyo (2009)
- Amador (2010)
- Midnight in Paris (2011)
- Politics, an Instruction Manual (2016)
- Sergio and Sergei (2017)
- My Masterpiece (2018)
- 4x4 (2019)
- Rifkin's Festival (2020)
- Official Competition (2021)
- The Good Boss (2021)
