= CTXT =

Spanish online publication

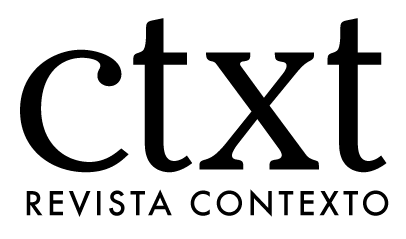
- Format: On-line, print
- Founded: January 2015
- Language: Spanish, English
- Headquarters: Madrid, Spain
- Website: https://ctxt.es/

CTXT is a left wing independent Spanish online publication founded in January 2015 that offers long-form news analysis and opinion. Its office is in Madrid, Spain. CTXT is an abbreviation of the name Revista Contexto.

== Description ==
CTXT was founded by fourteen journalists from a variety of newspapers in Europe, including El País, El Mundo, and La Repubblica. It was created to be a platform for journalists to write with full independence, without serving corporate, political or editorial interests. On its website, CTXT states that its primary goals are "to provide political and economic context to the most relevant news, anticipate the most important issues that will define the news agenda, dynamize culture and creation, promote the debate of ideas and communicate and analyze facts with discipline, honesty, humor (whenever possible), and criticism." It claims to offer an alternative to what it views as the inundation of fast, poorly-edited and often vapid news generated by social media and post-truth politics. Its motto, translated from the website, is "proud to arrive late to the latest news."

CTXT covers topics relating primarily to politics and economics, as well as culture and sports, in Spain, Europe and the rest of the world. It has a multimedia section with video interviews, photography and political cartoons. In 2017, CTXT released a video series called "Qué hacer" ("What is to be done") reflecting on the presidency of Donald Trump. The series consists of thirteen interviews with prominent intellectuals in the United States, including Wendy Brown, Silvia Federici and Nancy Fraser.

The CTXT website includes an English-language section called the "English Corner," and frequently posts interviews and articles from English-language sources translated into Spanish.

CTXT's online content is available for free to the public in a weekly format. Subscribers receive a monthly print publication with a changing theme, called the Dobladillo. Past Dobladillo themes have included feminism and the 8M strike in Spain, Spain's gag law (Ley Mordaza), Gay Pride, Carnaval, and post-truth politics. In early 2018, CTXT and the Spanish publisher Lengua de Trapo launched a new independent press, Editorial Colección Contextos. CTXT also has a collaborative editorial agreement with the Spanish left-wing online newspaper Público and the US-based magazine The Baffler.

CTXT accepts only sponsors and advertisers that do not interfere with the editorial line. 53% of its budget comes from the subscriber base; advertising accounts for only 12.9%.

== Staff and contributors ==
CTXT's honorary president was the philosopher and linguist Noam Chomsky until February 2026, when the board of trustees of the Foundation decided to remove him from the presidency after his support for Jeffrey Epstein became known. The director of CTXT is Miguel Mora, who for 22 years worked as the Lisbon, Rome and Paris correspondent at El País. In 2010 Mora was awarded the prize of the European Parliament for the best reporting on the integration of minorities, and in 2014 he was awarded the April 8 Prize of the Institute of Roma Culture.

The deputy directors of CTXT are Vanesa Jiménez, former director of La Información and former deputy director of El País, and Mónica Andrade, who is also the CEO of Revista Contexto S.L., the publisher of CTXT.

Members of the editorial board come from a variety of backgrounds and include the journalists Soledad Gallego-Díaz, Jesús Ceberio, Concita De Gregorio, Kostas Vaxevanis, Joaquín Estefanía and Giancarlo Santalmassi, the actor Aitana Sánchez-Gijón, the social scientist Ignacio Sánchez-Cuenca, the filmmaker José Luis Cuerda, the art critic Hans Ulrich Obrist, the artists Miquel Barceló and Alberto Reguera and the French sociologist Éric Fassin.

== Journalism Awards ==
Since 2025, CTXT awards the journalism prize Premios Contexto y Acción de periodismo. The first prizes were awarded to the journalists Soledad Gallego-Díaz, Olga Rodríguez, Ramón J. Campo, and the Israeli magazine +972 Magazine, as well as to Yuval Abraham and Basel Adra, authors of the documentary No Other Land.
