= Carlos Castrodeza =

Spanish biologist and philosopher

Carlos Castrodeza Ruíz de la Cuesta (1945 – April 2012) was a Spanish biologist and philosopher. He taught philosophy of science at Madrid's Complutense University.

== Biography ==
=== Work ===
Authority on Darwin and Darwinism, Castrodeza's thought focuses on bioethical problems from an ethological viewpoint and on scientific problems (epistemological) and ideologies from a naturalistic perspective. Castrodeza's Darwinian trilogy Biology's Deep Ways Razón biológica (Biological Reason), Nihilismo y supervivencia (Nihilism and Survival) y La darwinización del mundo (The Darwinization of the World) intends to show how little control we have over our future despite our profound preoccupation for things past. For Castrodeza ethological considerations referring to behavioural mental patterns concerning man's philosophical, theological and scientific activities have a lot to say as to how we build the world in which we strive to survive. These patterns are not necessarily directly adaptative, in fact they are part of the package deal integrated in our overall strategy for survival. Naturally this strategy need not be the proper one in the sense that we may not meet adequately after all the survival challenges we have in front of us. In fact nothing guaranties our survival and we may perfectly be in spite of our mental sophistication on the wrong track. Our wishes and intentions may have little to do with the best way to survive in the long run and may be at bottom we do not even care. We act and hope for the best on the basis of our experience which is not very much to go by.

== Books ==
- La darwinización del mundo, Barcelona, Herder, 2009, ISBN 978-84-254-2580-6
- El flujo de la historia y el sentido de la vida. La retórica irresistible de la selección natural, Barcelona, Herder, 2013 (The flow of history and the meaning of life. The irresistible rhetoric of natural selection), ISBN 978-84-254-2945-3
- Nihilismo y supervivencia: una expresión naturalista de lo inefable, Madrid, Trotta, 2007 (Nihilism and survival: A naturalistic expression of the indescribable) ISBN 978-84-8164-916-1
- Los límites de la historia natural: hacia una nueva biología del conocimiento, Madrid (Tres Cantos), Akal, 2003, (Natural History boundaries: Towards a new biology of knowledge) ISBN 84-460-1881-0
- La marsopa de Heidegger: el lugar de la ciencia en la cultura actual, Madrid, Dykinson, 2003 (Heidegger's porpoise: The place of science in today's Western Culture) ISBN 84-9772-022-9
- Razón biológica: la base evolucionista del pensamiento, Madrid, Minerva, 1999 (Biological thinking: The evolutionist roots of thought) ISBN 84-88123-20-5 (Book reviewed in Biology and Philosophy by Andrés Moya, 2001).
- Teoría histórica de la selección natural, Madrid, Alhambra, 1988 (Historical theory of natural selection) ISBN 84-205-1740-2 (Book reviewed in Biology and Philosophy by Thomas Glick, 1992).
- Ortodoxia darwiniana y progreso biológico, Madrid, Alianza Editorial, 1988 (Darwinian orthodoxy and biological progress) ISBN 84-206-2521-3 (Book reviewed in Biology and Philosophy by Thomas Glick, 1992).

=== Chapters in collective works (selection) ===
- "Ethological Space: Transgreding the Boundaries", Philosophical Essays on Physics and Biology (J. L. González Recio, ed.), Georg Olms Verlag, Hildesheim-Zürich-New York, 2009, ISBN 978-3-487-13713-1 pp. 91–112.
- "La Inutilidad de la Felicidad", Apología de lo Inútil (S. Eguidazu, ed.), Madrid, Avarigani Editores, 2009, ISBN 978-84-613-1278-8 pp. 23–30.
- "Los caminos profundos de la biología", El legado filosófico y científico del siglo XX, coord. por Manuel Garrido, Luis Arenas, Luis Valdés, 2005, ISBN 84-376-2272-7, pp. 795–812
- "La condición occidental: ciencia, historia y filosofía", El impacto social de la cultura científica y técnica, 2004, ISBN 84-369-3843-7, pp. 9–18
- "Modernidad y posmodernidad: biología y física", El impacto social de la cultura científica y técnica, 2004, ISBN 84-369-3843-7, pp. 155–164
- "La 'superflua necesidad' de la epistemología evolutiva", La teoría evolucionista del conocimiento, coord. por Jacobo Muñoz, Emilio García García, 1999, ISBN 84-89784-88-4, pp. 83–92

=== Translations ===
- A. H. Lehninger et al., Panorama de la biología contemporánea, selección y comentarios de Roland Hoste, Spanish version from Carlos Castrodeza, 2da. ed, Madrid, Alianza, 1975 ISBN 84-206-2128-5
- Ruse, Michael, La revolución darwinista, Madrid. Alianza Editorial, 1983, ISBN 84-206-2372-5

=== Articles (selection) ===
- "En torno a la ética naturalizada en Occidente: de la concepción aristotélica al naturalismo de Darwin y la fenomenología de Heidegger", Teorema, ISSN 0210-1602, vol. XXVIII/2, 2009, pp. 151–172
- "Evolución, historia y ser", Pasajes: Revista de pensamiento contemporáneo, ISSN 1575-2259, Nº. 14, 2004, pp. 23–34
- "Antropogénesis: consideraciones biohermenéuticas", Endoxa: Series Filosóficas, ISSN 1133-5351, Nº 17, 2004, pp. 297–326
- "Una historia natural del bien", Trama y fondo: revista de cultura, ISSN 1137-4802, Nº. 15, 2003, pp. 7–12
- "De la realidad biológica a la biologización de la realidad: la nueva metafísica biológica y el problema del conocimiento", Diálogo filosófico, ISSN 0213-1196, Nº 57, 2003, pp. 379–399
- "La realidad de las dos culturas como base del mito del relativismo cultural (Un enfoque bioantropológico)", Endoxa: Series Filosóficas, ISSN 1133-5351, Nº 12, 2, 2000, pp. 525–560
- "Una perspectiva de los problemas éticos en la investigación biológica: los avatares del evolucionismo", Arbor: Ciencia, pensamiento y cultura, ISSN 0210-1963, Nº 638, 1999 (Ejemplar dedicado a: Ciencia y valores éticos / coord. por Wenceslao J. González Fernández), pp. 265–287
- "El naturalismo biológico de Kuhn en La estructura de las revoluciones científicas", Thémata: Revista de filosofía, ISSN 0212-8365, Nº 20, 1998 (Ejemplar dedicado a: Los filósofos y la biología), pp. 219–228
- "The ultimate epistemological consequences of the Darwinian conception", Boston Studies in the Philosophy of Science, ISSN 0068-0346, 1996, pp. 153–178
- "De la epistemología popperiana a la epistemología darwinista", Revista de filosofía, ISSN 0034-8244, Nº 8, 1992, pp. 329–356
- "La tácita actualidad del darwinismo", Revista de Occidente, ISSN 0034-8635, Nº 18–19, 1982 (Ejemplar dedicado a: Charles R. Darwin. la evolución y el origen del hombre), pp. 89–104
- "Gregor Johann Mendel: clérigo notable en la Moravia decimonónica", Revista de Occidente, ISSN 0034-8635, Nº 32, 1984 (Ejemplar dedicado a: Gregor Johann Mendel: los orígenes de la genética), pp. 7–26
- "Non-progressive evolution, the red queen hypothesis and the balance of nature", Acta Biotheoretica, ISSN 0001-5342, Nº28, 1979, pp. 11–18
- "On the significance of biological interpretations of mathematical results; comments on a recently discovered evolutionary principle", Methodology and Science, ISSN 0543-6095, Nº 11, 1978, pp. 185–190
- "Evolution, complexity and fitness", Journal of Theoretical Biology, ISSN 0022-5193, Nº 71, 1978, pp. 469–471
- "Tautologies, beliefs and empirical knowledge in biology", The American Naturalist, ISSN 0003-0147, Nº 111, 1977, pp. 393–394

Castrodeza has also published in sites such as Annals of Science or ISIS and has been for a time in the editorial board of History and Philosophy of the Biological Sciences(1985–90)
