= Ignacio Escolar =

Spanish blogger and journalist

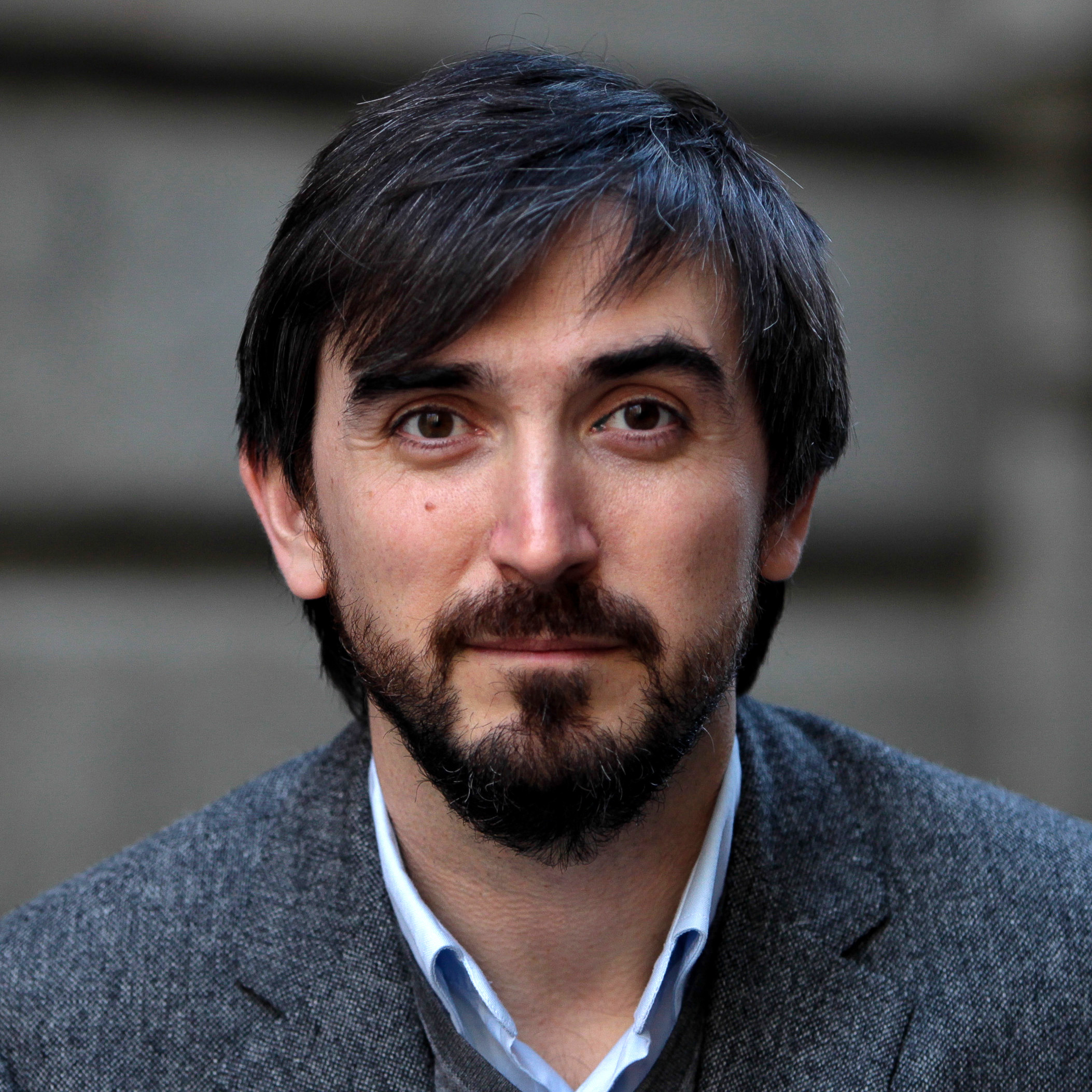
- Born: Ignacio Escolar García; 20 December 1975 (age 50); Burgos, Spain
- Occupations: journalist, writer, blogger
- Writing career
- Language: Spanish
- Notable awards: Premio Nicolás Salmerón de Derechos Humanos, Premio de Periodismo Digital 'José Manuel Porquet'
- Website: www.eldiario.es/escolar/

Ignacio Escolar García (born 20 December 1975 in Burgos) is a Spanish blogger and journalist. He currently leads the digital newspaper eldiario.es and he is also a political analyst in radio and television. He was founder and first director of the newspaper Público.

== Journalistic career ==
He began to study journalism at the Complutense University of Madrid although he dropped off his studies, beginning his journalistic career in 1995, collaborating in newspapers such as Cinco Días and El Mundo and magazines such as Muy Interesante, Rolling Stone, GEO and Quo. In 1999 he joined in the nightly news of Telecinco, as responsible for El navegante, a section of the Internet broadcast daily. In 2004 he worked as a media consultant in Mexico and Ecuador. Back in Spain, he was named coordinator of the web of news of Telecinco. He left this post to become deputy director of La Voz de Almería, Cadena SER Almería, and Localia Almería, which would make him also an opinion journalist in programs or tertulias such as La Ventana and Hoy por hoy of the Cadena Ser. He returned to Madrid to be the first director of the newspaper Público, which he led from its founding in September 2007 until his dismissal on 13 January 2009. From that date until March 2012 he was a daily columnist in Público. In this year Escolar left this job to establish the online newspaper eldiario.es.

He has also taken part in political tertulias of TVE, Cuatro, Telecinco and Veo7, as Los Desayunos de TVE, La noche en 24 horas or 59 segundos (2007–2012), La vuelta al mundo (2009–2011) in Veo7, Las mañanas de Cuatro (2013–2014 ) with Jesús Cintora, or El gran debate (2012–2013).

He was a regular contributor to Hoy por hoy of Cadena Ser until he was fired, in April 2016, through a direct order from its headman, Juan Luis Cebrián. The reason was that eldiario.es, paper that Escolar rules, linked Cebrián to the "Panama Papers", albeit indirectly. So Cebrián decided to take legal action against eldiario.es, El Confidencial and LaSexta.

Escolar has an exclusive contract with LaSexta collaborating in the main programs of this TV network: Al rojo vivo (2015–present), Más vale tarde and La Sexta noche (2015–present). Escolar also collaborates with international media as The Guardian in the UK and Clarín in Argentina.

== Blogger ==
As blogger Escolar began his career in 2001 editing spanishpop.net, page dedicated to indie pop which remained active until 2006. In 2003 began Escolar.net, a blog initially destined to Internet today, but later would focus on current political events. Escolar.net is considered the most followed Spanish blog about politics.

In this blog is also housed the Escolar.net wiki, which has served as a platform for various social movements like Movimiento por una vivienda digna (Movement for decent housing), Manifiesto en defensa de los derechos fundamentales en Internet (Manifesto in defense of fundamental rights on the Internet), among others. Also from 2003 Escolar collaborates in the cultural blog Elastico.net.

== Musician ==
Ignacio Escolar is also a musician of alternative style. He was a member of the group indie pop Meteosat, and has also recorded several songs of electronic music under the name of Decodek, which are available under a free license.

== Writer ==
Along with his father, Arsenio Escolar, also a journalist, he published in September 2010 an essay: La nación inventada, una historia differente de Castilla (The invented nation, a different history of Castile), where they review the medieval history of Castile and the origin of its founding myths. He is also author of the novella 31 noches (31 Nights) which was serialized in the newspaper Public in the summer of 2009. This book was published into the collection "Conspicua" of ed. "Suma de Letras". He is also coauthor of Reacciona, published by ed. Aguilar.

His published writings include:

- Escolar, Ignacio; Escolar, Arsenio (2010). La nación inventada. Una historia diferente de Castilla. Madrid: Ediciones Península. ISBN 978-84-9942-047-9.
- Varios Autores (2011). Reacciona. Madrid: Aguilar. ISBN 978-84-0310-200-2.
- Escolar, Ignacio (2012). 31 noches. Suma de Letras. ISBN 978-84-8365-341-8.
- Escolar, Ignacio (2012). La crisis en 100 apuntes. Debate. ISBN 978-84-9992-226-3.
- Escolar, Ignacio; Escolar, Arsenio (2012). El justiciero cruel. Península. ISBN 978-84-9942-157-5.

== Awards ==
- "García Márquez" Award of Journalism (2018).
- First winner Premio de Periodismo Digital "José Manuel Porquet" for the article "Por favor, pirateen mis canciones".
- Premio "Mujeres progresistas", for not to accept advertisements of prostitution in the newspaper Público and consider NGOs as information sources.
- Premio "Nicolás Salmerón" of Human Rights, in the category of Communication, for his defense of Human Rights.
- His blog, Escolar.net, winner of the award of the web Bitacoras.com in 2008 and 2009 for the best political blog.

== Personal life ==
He is the son of the journalist Arsenio Escolar, who headed the free daily 20 minutos.

In religion, he has declared himself as an atheist.
