= Rubén Juste =

Spanish sociologist and political consultant

- Rubén Juste de Ancos
- Born: 1985 (age 40–41); Toledo, Spain
- Other names: Karim
- Education: Sociology
- Alma mater: Complutense University of Madrid
- Occupations: Sociologist, writer and political consultant
- Notable work: IBEX 35. Una historia herética del poder en España

Rubén Juste de Ancos (Toledo, 1985) is a Spanish sociologist, researcher and political consultant.

== Biography ==
Rubén Juste is a graduate and doctor in Sociology by the Complutense University of Madrid. His doctoral thesis focused on the revolving doors in the IBEX 35.

Due to the Spanish economic crisis, he emigrated to Australia having different occupations. Later, he moved to Latin America, settling first in Paraguay, where he worked in the Universidad Católica "Nuestra Señora de la Asunción" and as a political consultant for the Guasú Front during the term of Fernando Lugo until his dismissal as president. Later he also was an advisor for Avanza País. He left Paraguay to move to Ecuador, working in the Simón Bolívar Andean University.

Since 2016 he has contributed to CTXT newspaper with diverse analysis of historical and current economic policy. In 2017 he became a political advisor to the group Unidos Podemos in the Congress.

== Work ==
Juste's main research has been the close relationship between political and economic elites in Spain. He analyzes how these relationships did manage and still manage the country's politics, from the privatization processes of the large State-owned enterprises, to the loss of sovereignty when those same companies have finally become part of large foreign capitals. Much of this research, pioneer in Spain, is collected in his first book, IBEX 35. Una historia herética del poder en España (IBEX 35. A heretical history of power in Spain).

=== Books ===
- IBEX 35. Una historia herética del poder en España (2017).
- La nueva clase dominante. Gestores, inversores y tecnólogos. Una historia del poder desde Colón y el Consejo de Indias hasta BlackRock y Amazon (2020).

=== Featured publications ===
- Hegemonía colorada y alternancia política en Paraguay: Los límites de la victoria de Horacio Cartes. Revista Novapolis. 2014.
- Medios de comunicación, referencias nominales y poder en Paraguay. Revista Latina de Comunicación Social. 2014.
- El pueblo en movimiento: el proceso de democratización en América Latina como transformación constante. Un análisis del caso de Ecuador. Revista electrónica de estudios latinoamericanos. 2013.
- Redes de actores en medios de prensa. Una metodología para abordar la hegemonía en los medios de comunicación: el ejemplo de las elecciones de 2013 en Paraguay. Chasqui. Revista Latinoamericana de Comunicación. 2013.
