= El Orden Mundial =

Spanish international affairs analysis outlet

- Native name: El Orden Mundial en el siglo XXI
- Type: Weekly newspaper
- Format: Online newspaper
- Editor: Blas Moreno
- General manager: Fernando Arancón
- Founded: 2018
- Language: Spanish
- Headquarters: Madrid
- Country: Spain
- Price: Subscription from €6 per month
- Website: El Orden Mundial

El Orden Mundial (EOM, lit. 'The World Order') is a Spanish media outlet focused on the analysis of geopolitics and international relations. It was founded in 2012 as a blog and became an independent media organization in 2018.

The philosophy of El Orden Mundial is based on providing accessible yet rigorous analysis, moving beyond the news itself to explain events within their corresponding historical, political, economic, sociological, military, cultural, or religious context.

El Orden Mundial has collaborated with other media outlets, such as eldiario.es, Julia en la onda, Al rojo vivo, or Geópolis.

Since 2023, it has produced its own podcast, No es el fin del mundo, which received the Ondas Award for Best Conversational Podcast in 2025.

== Published books ==
- En la mente de... Cómo piensan los líderes autoritarios del siglo XXI (y por qué ganan) (in Spanish). Ariel. 2026. ISBN 9788434440944.
- Las fuerzas que mueven el mundo. La geopolítica y la economía global en mapas (in Spanish). Ariel. 2025. ISBN 9788434439665.
- El mundo no es como crees. Cómo nuestro mundo y nuestra vida están plagados de falsas creencias (in Spanish). Planeta. 2020. ISBN 9788434432918.
