= Soledad Gallego-Díaz =

Spanish journalist (1951–2026)

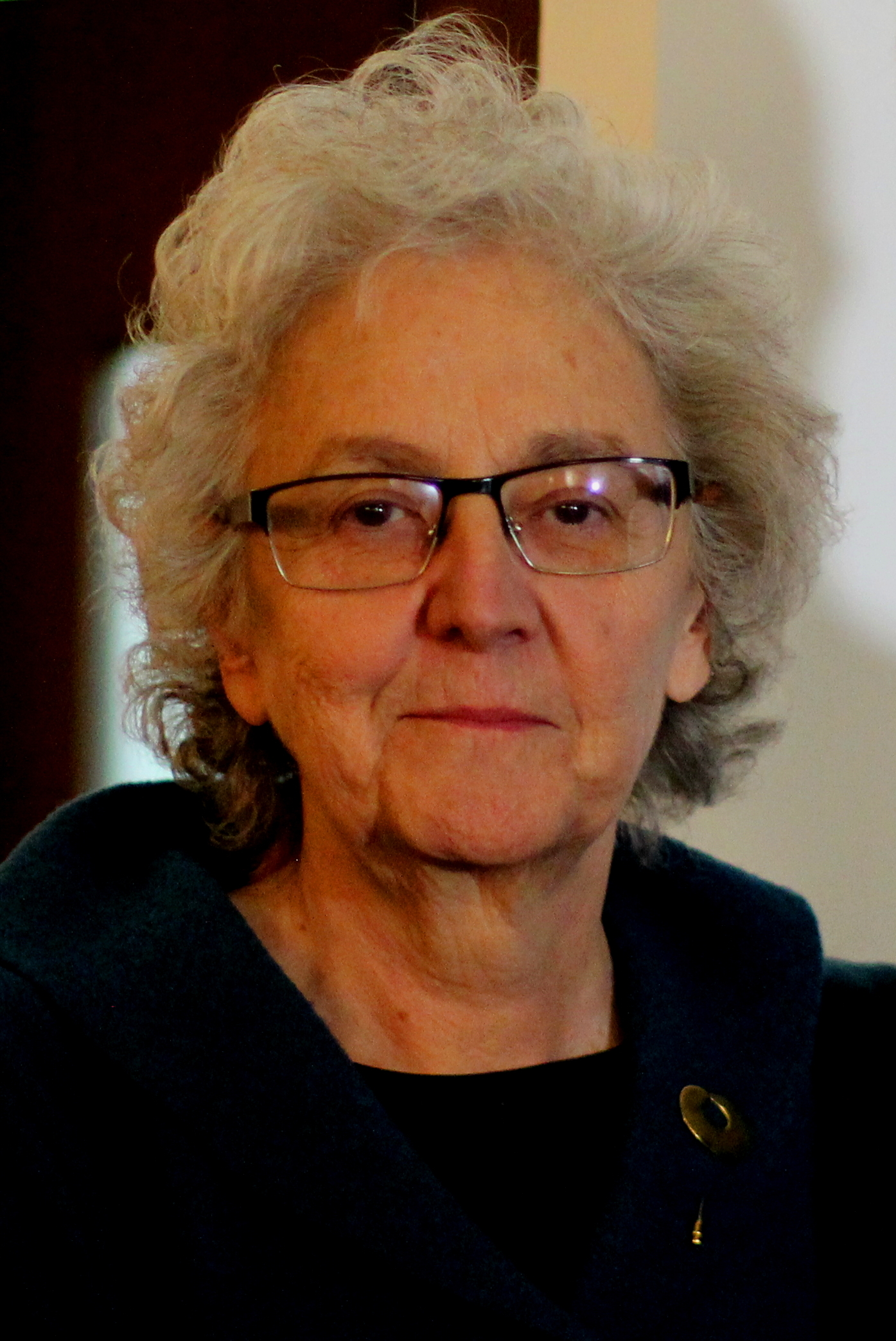
- Gallego-Díaz in 2016
- Born: 21 April 1951; Madrid, Spain
- Died: 5 May 2026 (aged 75); Madrid, Spain
- Occupation: Journalist
- Title: Editor of El País
- Term: June 2018 – June 2020
- Predecessor: Antonio Caño
- Successor: Javier Moreno Barber
- Awards: Cirilo Rodríguez Journalism Award (2010)

Soledad Gallego-Díaz Fajardo (21 April 1951 – 5 May 2026) was a Spanish journalist. She was the editor of Spanish newspaper El País from June 2018 to June 2020.

== Life and career ==
Born in Madrid on 21 April 1951, she lived for a year in Palo Alto and another year in Nashville when she was a toddler. She took studies at the Official School of Journalism of Madrid. She worked for Pyresa and Cuadernos para el Diálogo before joining El País shortly after the foundation of the newspaper in 1976.

Gallego-Díaz was a correspondent in Brussels, Paris, London, Buenos Aires and New York City.

She won the Cirilo Rodríguez Journalism Award in 2010.

Her appointment as the first-ever female editor of El País was announced in June 2018. She succeeded Antonio Caño, who had been the editor since 2014.

Before becoming the editor of El País she also collaborated in Hoy por hoy and was a member of the editorial board of CTXT.

Gallego-Díaz died on 5 May 2026, at the age of 75.
