= Diego Galán =

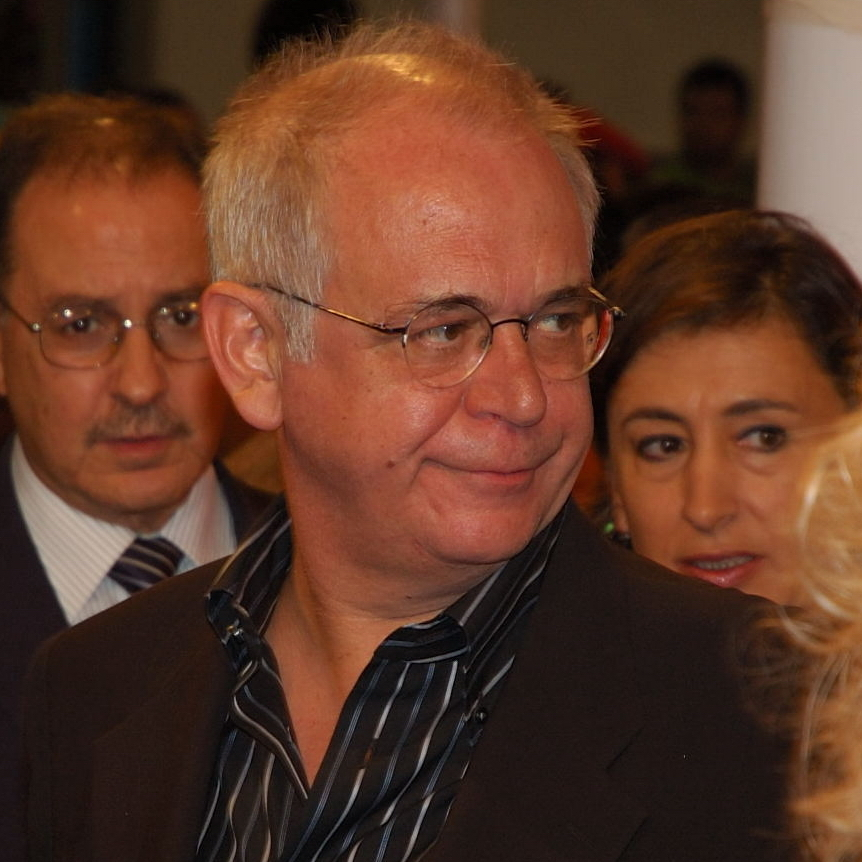
- Galán in 2006
- Born: Diego Galán Fernández; 13 October 1946; Tangier, Morocco
- Died: 15 April 2019 (aged 72); Madrid, Spain
- Occupations: Film critic; journalist; film historian; filmmaker; programmer

Diego Galán Fernández (13 October 1946 – 15 April 2019) was a Spanish film critic, journalist, film historian, and filmmaker. He served as director of the San Sebastián International Film Festival from 1986 to 1989 and from 1995 to 2000.

== Life and career ==
Diego Galán Fernández was born on 13 October 1946 in Tangier, where he was raised until moving to Madrid at age 19. He worked as an administrator and accountant. Beginning in 1967, he began to write film criticism for Nuestro cine and then Triunfo and El País.

Focusing on documentary filmmaking, he directed works such as Pablo G. del Amo, un montador de ilusiones (2005), Con la pata quebrada (2013) and Manda huevos (2016). He also authored books such as 8 españoles de posguerra, Venturas y desventuras de la prima Angélica, Berlanga o el cine muerto de hambre, Fernando Fernán-Gómez, apasionadas andanzas de un señor muy pelirrojo, Emiliano Piedra, un productor, Jaime de Armiñán, and 15 cartas a Fernando Rey. In 2018, he was awarded the Gold Medal of the Spanish Film Academy. He died in Madrid on 15 April 2019, aged 72.
