= Nazanin Armanian =

Iranian writer and political scientist

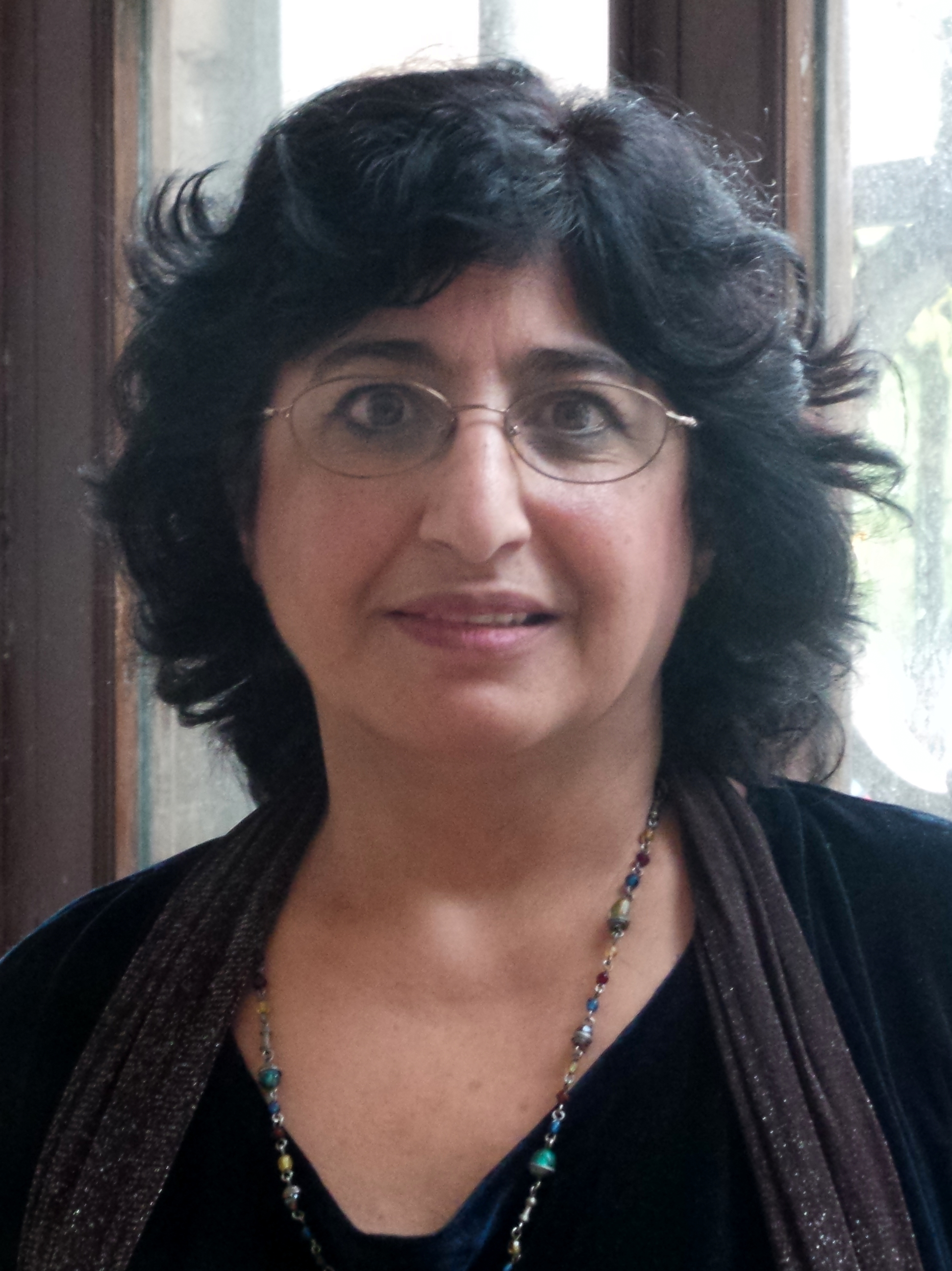
- Nazanin Armanian in 2015
- Born: نازنین ارمنیان; 1961; Shiraz Iran Pahlavi
- Occupation(s): writer and political scientist
- Notable work: Irán, la revolución constante

Nazanin Armanian (Persian: نازنین ارمنیان) (Shiraz, 21 January 1961) is an Iranian writer and political scientist, exiled in Spain since 1983.

She graduated in political science from the Spanish National University of Distance Education (UNED), where she taught political sciences from 2009 to 2013. From 2007 to 2012 she was also a professor of Islamic affairs in complementary courses at the University of Barcelona. In 2015 he taught the subject of International Relations at UNED. She is also a sworn translator from Persian to Spanish.

Her area of research is the Islamic world, political Islam, the geopolitics of the Middle East and North Africa, and women's rights.

In her articles, books and conferences she demystifies the situation of women in the Arab-Muslim world and denounces the rise of fundamentalism in all religions. She points out that in 1964, Iran, along with France, were the only two countries in the world that had a woman minister. Until 1978, Iranian women had more rights than Spanish women, but since the Islamic revolution their rights have been cut, recalls Armanian, who is particularly critical of the revolution in Iran, the country from which she was exiled when she was 20 years old, when the country fell into the hands of the ayatollahs who replaced the shah's government.

She began writing at the age of 27 and published her first book at 32. She collaborates in various Spanish media with political analyses. She maintains a weekly column in her blog Punto y Seguido in the Spanish newspaper Público.

== Books ==
- No es la religión, estúpido. Chiíes y suníes, la utilidad de un conflicto (es). With Martha Zein (Akal, 2016)
- Irán, la revolución constante (es). With Martha Zein (Flor del viento, 2012)
- El Islam sin velo (es). With Martha Zein (Ediciones del Bronce (Planeta), 2009)
- Irak, Afganistán e Irán: 40 respuestas al conflicto de Oriente Próximo (es). With Martha Zein (Lengua de trapo, 2007)
- Cuentos persas (es). (Ediciones de la Torre, 2006)
- Al gusto persa: tradiciones y ritos (es). (Zendrera, 2006)
- Kurdistán: El país inexistente (es). (Flor del viento, 2005)
- El viento nos llevará: poesía persa contemporánea (es).(Libros de la Frontera, 2001)
- El cuentacuentos persa: los relatos que hicieron soñar al emperador (es).(Océano, 1997)
