= Politics, an Instruction Manual =

Politics, manual of instructions
- Spanish: Politica, manual de instrucciones
- Directed by: Fernando León de Aranoa
- Written by: Fernando León de Aranoa
- Produced by: Jaume Roures; Fernando León de Aranoa
- Starring: Pablo Iglesias; Íñigo Errejón; Juan Carlos Monedero; Carolina Bescansa; José Mujica
- Cinematography: Jordi Abusada
- Edited by: Yago Muñiz
- Music by: Antonio Sanchez
- Production companies: Reposado PC; The Mediapro Studio
- Distributed by: Beta Films
- Release date: 3 June 2016 (Spain)
- Running time: 115 minutes
- Country: Spain
- Language: Spanish

Politics, an Instruction Manual (Spanish: Política, manual de instrucciones) is a 2016 documentary film directed by Fernando León of Aranoa where the director and his team follow to the leaders of Podemos during roughly a year and half until the elections to the Congress of Spain of 20 December 2015. It was released in Spain on 3 June 2016.
