= Arrigo Levi =

Italian journalist (1926–2020)

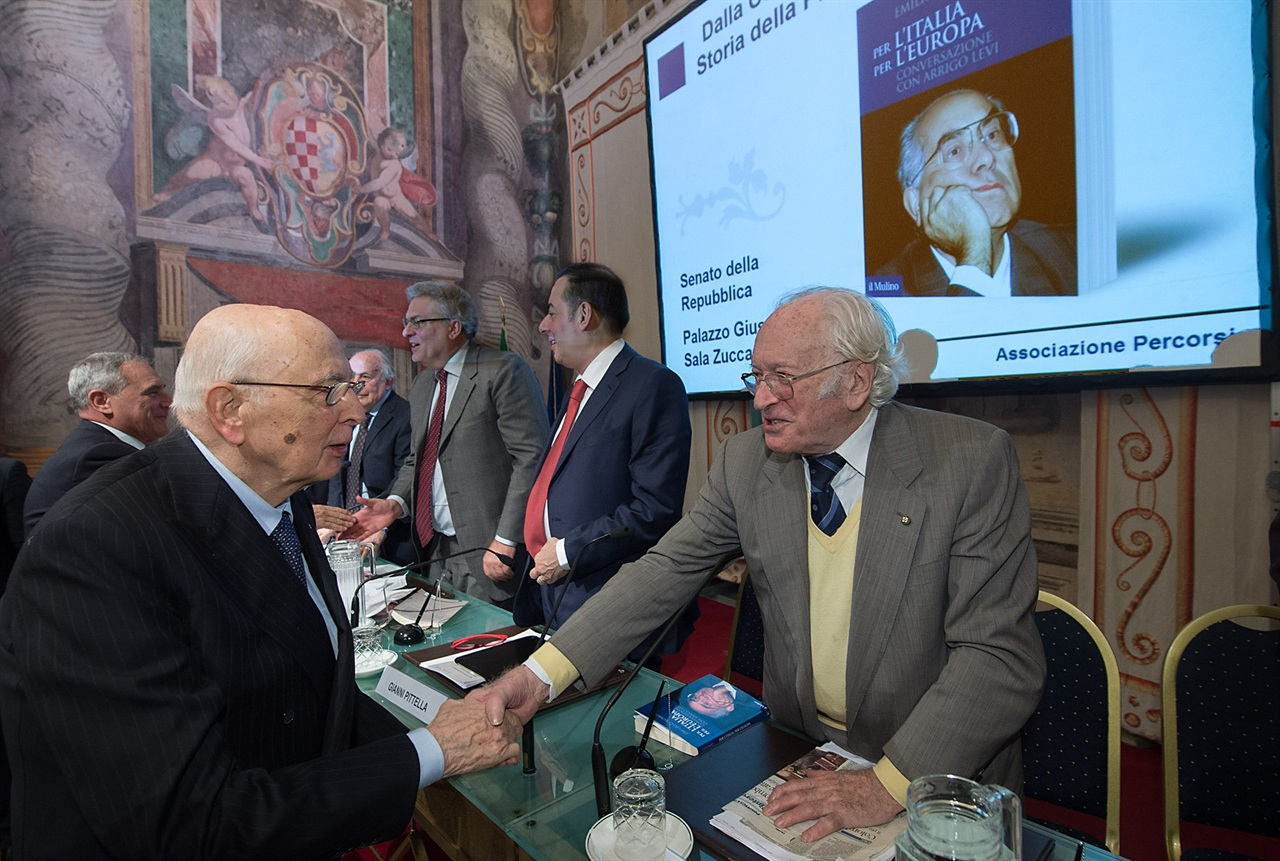
- Arrigo Levi with Italian President Giorgio Napolitano
- Born: 17 July 1926; Modena, Italy
- Died: 24 August 2020 (aged 94); Rome, Italy
- Occupations: Journalist, writer, TV anchorman
- Writing career
- Period: 1943–2013

Arrigo Levi (17 July 1926 – 24 August 2020) was an Italian journalist, essayist, and television anchorman.

== Life ==
=== Exile to Argentina ===
Levi was from a family of Jewish descent (his father Enzo was a renowned lawyer in Modena). In 1938, when he was twelve he moved to Argentina with his family in order to escape Fascist persecution. In Buenos Aires he completed his studies and in 1943 he began his career in journalism, as the director of Italia libera (Free Italy).

=== Career ===
After the war he left Argentina and returned to Modena with his family, just in time to take part in the national referendum, on June 2, 1946, for the Italians to choose between Monarchy and Republic. At twenty, he continued his journalism career in Modena and managed the newspaper Gazzetta di Modena for almost two years, until he chose to live in Israel. From 1951 to 1953, he was a correspondent from London for the Turin daily Gazzetta del Popolo. From 1953 to 1959, he wired his pieces from Rome to the Milan evening newspaper Corriere di Informazione.

=== Important assignments ===
In 1960, Levi moved to Moscow. There, until 1962, he was a correspondent for the Corriere della Sera and then, until 1966, a correspondent for Il Giorno. In 1966 he moved to RAI, where he was the chief newscaster until 1968 (this was an innovative change on Italian TV, because previously the News were read by professional "speakers" and not by journalists). Levi returned to the press in 1969, as correspondent for the Turin newspaper La Stampa, a job he kept until 1973, when he became the managing director of that very newspaper and its evening edition Stampa Sera. He remained in Turin until 1978. From 1979 to 1983, he collaborated with The Times, editing its international section. In 1988, he was appointed Chief Editor of Corriere della Sera and from 1998 to July 3, 2007, he was Adviser for External Relations to two Italian presidents, first Carlo Azeglio Ciampi and then Giorgio Napolitano.

=== Television ===
Besides the TV News which he led in the 60s, Levi was involved in numerous TV programs, mainly produced for RAI. Among these: Tam Tam (1981), Punto sette and Punto sette, una vita. Then, for Channel 5, Tivù Tivù with Angelo Campanella (from 1985 to 1987). Thereafter, again for RAI: I giorni dell'infanzia (1993), Emozioni TV (1995) and Gli archivi del Cremlino (The Kremlin Archives) (1997), a program which he also authored. In 1999, on RAI1, he directed C'era una volta la Russia (Once Upon A Time, Russia).

=== Death ===
Levi died on 24 August 2020 in Rome at the age of 94.

== Quote ==
Comprendi il valore della libertà solo nel momento in cui la perdi. E riacquistarla è la cosa più bella (You understand the value of freedom only once you've lost it. And to gain it again is the most beautiful thing).

— Arrigo Levi

== Bibliography ==
A selection among the many books and essays published by Arrigo Levi:

- L'economia degli Stati Uniti oggi – L'america del boom (RAI, 1966) (with Alberto Ronchey)
- Il potere in Russia da Stalin a Breznev (Il Mulino, 1967)
- La televisione all'italiana (1969, Etas Kompass)
- Viaggio fra gli economisti (1970, Il Mulino)
  - Journey Among The Economists (1974, Open Court) ISBN 978-0-912050-12-6
- PCI, la lunga marcia verso il potere (1971, Etas Kompass)
- Un'idea dell'Italia (1979, Mondadori)
- Il comunismo da Budapest a Praga 1956 – 1958 (with Enzo Bettiza, Adolfo Battaglia e Ennio Ceccarini) (1969, Edizioni della voce)
- Ipotesi sull'Italia (1983, Il Mulino)
- La Democrazia nell'Italia che cambia (1984, Laterza)
- Intervista sulla DC (1986)
- Noi: gli italiani (1988, Laterza) ISBN 88-420-3216-6
- Tra Est e Ovest (1990, Rizzoli) ISBN 88-17-84019-X
- Yitzhak Rabin. 1210 giorni per la pace (1996, Mondadori) ISBN 88-04-41603-3
- Le due fedi (1996, Il Mulino)
- La vecchiaia può attendere: ovvero l'arte di restare giovani (1997, Mondadori) ISBN 88-04-42129-0
- Rapporto sul Medio Oriente (1998, Il Mulino) ISBN 88-15-06621-7
- Russia del '900: una storia europea (1999, Corbaccio) ISBN 88-7972-310-3
- Dialoghi di fine Millennio (1999, Rizzoli) (with Andrea Riccardi and Eugenio Scalfari)
- Dialoghi sulla fede (2000, Il Mulino) (with Vincenzo Paglia and Andrea Riccardi)
- America latina: memorie e ritorni (2004, Il Mulino)
- Cinque discorsi tra due secoli (2004, Il Mulino]) ISBN 88-15-09913-1

== Prizes and recognition ==
- Knight Grand Cross (1991)
- Trento Prize for Journalism (1987)
- Luigi Barzini Prize as Best Correspondent for the year 1995
- Ischia International Journalism Award (2001)
- Guidarello Prize (2006)
