= Jesús Ceberio =

Spanish journalist (born 1946)

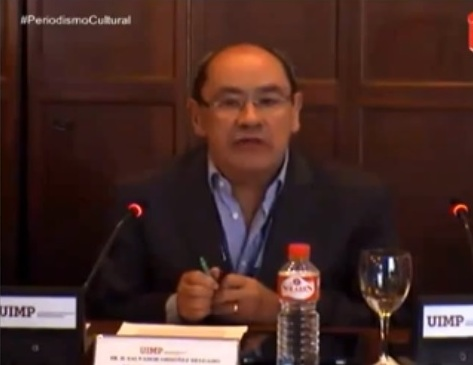
- Image of Jesús Ceberio
- Born: 1946 (age 79–80); Hondarribia, Spain
- Education: University of Navarra
- Occupation: Journalist
- Honours: Ischia International Journalism Award (2004)

Jesús Ceberio Galardi (born 1946 in Hondarribia, Gipuzkoa) is a Spanish journalist. He served as editor-in-chief of El País from 1993 to 2006. He graduated from the School of Journalism of the University of Navarra, where he also studied philosophy.

== Biography ==
Ceberio began his career working for El Correo between 1970 and 1976. He was a correspondent for the Informaciones newspaper and an editor and host for Televisión Española. In 1976, he joined El País as a correspondent in the Basque Country. Between 1980 and 1985, he was in charge of Latin American correspondence; upon his return to Spain, he was named editor-in-chief.

In 1987, he was part of the team that published the weekly El Globo, of which he was deputy director and director. He returned to El País, where he was responsible for the Sunday edition and the information. In November 1993, he was appointed director of El País, a position he held until May 2006. During his time as director, he launched the first digital edition of the newspaper and expanded the newspaper's presence in Latin America.

Ceberio received the Ischia International Journalism Award in 2004. In 2006 he was named General Press Director of PRISA and, in 2011, editorial advisor of El País.
