= Triunfo (magazine) =

Cultural and political magazine in Spain (1946–1982)

- Categories: Cultural and political magazine
- Frequency: Weekly
- Founder: José Ángel Ezcurra
- Founded: 1946
- Final issue: August 1982
- Country: Spain
- Based in: Valencia (1946–1948); Madrid (1948–1982)
- Language: Spanish

Triunfo (Spanish: Triumph) was a weekly cultural and political magazine published from 1946 to 1982 in Madrid, Spain. Launched as an illustrated film magazine it became one of the most significant publications in the country during and after the Franco rule.

== History and profile ==
Triunfo was founded by José Ángel Ezcurra in Valencia in 1946 as an illustrated film magazine. He was also owner and editor of the magazine. In 1962, Ezcurra moved the magazine to Madrid where it was published weekly until August 1982.

Triunfo focused on general politics, social studies and popularized economics from 1945 to 1967. However, its orientation was changed and began to offer literary articles beginning by the mid-1960s. The magazine folded in 1982. Particularly from 1968, deputy editor Eduardo Haro Tecglen published lead editorials in the magazine, and the magazine became one of the intellectual references against the Francoist State. In the words of Paul Preston, the magazine was one of two "champions of democratic ideals", together with Cuadernos para el Diálogo. The articles in Triunfo on taboo subjects such as capital punishment or marriage led to it being subject to numerous trials and suspensions. The monographic issue on marriage led to the entire edition being confiscated, publication of the journal suspended for four months by the council of ministers, together with a fine of a quarter of a million pesetas, and the corresponding trial before the Tribunal de Orden Público. As a result, thousands of people took out subscriptions to the journal.

The four-month suspension ordered by the council of ministers in April 1975, for "attacks against the state security", as a result of an article by José Aumente "¿Estamos preparados para el cambio?" ("Are we ready for change?") was followed that same year by another four-month suspension for Montserrat Roig's interview with José Andreu Abelló. Following the death of Franco, the first monarchic government's general pardon for the journals and journalists accused of violating Manuel Fraga's 1966 Press Law (Ley de Prensa e Imprenta) excluded Triunfo. When the journal reappeared on 10 January 1976, its 166,000 copies were sold out within hours.

Writing in El País, Francisco Tomás y Valiente, the former president of Spain's Constitutional Court who was later assassinated by ETA, referred to the journal as "the name of a political battle for freedom, and from there, for a democratic society."

Apart from Haro Tacglen who, as well as writing under his own name, also contributed using the pen-names "Juan Aldebarán", "Pablo Berbén" and "Pozuelo", other leading collaborators included Enrique Miret Magdalena, Ramón Chao, Luis Carandell, Juan Goytisolo, Aurora de Albornoz and Manuel Vázquez Montalbán.

== See also ==
- List of magazines in Spain
