= Público (Spain) =

Spanish online newspaper

- Front page, 1 June 2009
- Type: Online newspaper
- Owner(s): Display Connectors, SL.
- Editor: Manuel Rico Prada
- Founded: 26 September 2007
- Ceased publication: (print) 24 February 2012
- Political alignment: Left-wing; Republicanism
- Headquarters: Calle Gran Vía, 30, Madrid, Spain
- Circulation: 7,592,279 unique visitors each month (online)
- Website: www.publico.es

Público (transl. 'Public') is a Spanish digital newspaper owned by Display Connectors. It is published online through the general news website Público.es, although it had a print version from its founding in September 2007 until February 2012.

It is national in scope, headquartered in Madrid, and consists of a staff of approximately 60 employees, including management, editorial staff, and administration. Led by Manuel Rico since April 2025 —previously Editor-in-Chief of Politics at the same newspaper in its first stage—the management team includes Chema Crespo as General Manager, Juan Carlos Ortiz as Deputy Editor, Ana Pardo de Vera as Corporate Director, Yeray Calvo as Editor-in-Chief, María José Pintor as Communications Director, and Pedro González de la Calleja as Editor-in-Chief.

== History and profile ==
Público was established in September 2007. The founder is Jaume Roures, head of Mediapro. One of only two national left-wing papers (the other being elDiario.es), the paper had a harder-left editorial line than El País. Público also aimed at a younger readership. The paper was two-thirds the length of its competitors and its price, initially only 50 cents, was less than half. The paper's original press run was 250,000 daily.

After several years of financial losses, and facing a €9 million deficit, Público folded its print edition in February 2012. In its last year, the paper was the ninth-largest general-interest newspaper in Spain, and the fifth-largest of those headquartered in Madrid.

The parent company Mediapro undertook to continue to publish the website publico.es, which as of 2014 was still active as an online newspaper.

Público and CTXT, a Spanish independent online publication, began a collaborative editorial agreement in June 2016.

== Editors ==
- Ignacio Escolar (2007–09)
- Félix Monteira (2009–10)
- Jesús Maraña (2010–12)
- Carlos Enrique Bayo (2012–16)
- Ana Pardo de Vera (2016-19)
- Virginia Pérez Alonso (2019-25)
- Manuel Rico Prada (since april, 2025)

== See also ==
- List of newspapers in Spain
- Nazanin Armanian
