= Ischia International Journalism Award =

Italian journalism award

- Awarded for: Excellence in journalism and communication
- Country: Italy
- Presented by: Ischia Prize
- First award: 1980
- Website: http://www.premioischia.it/

The Ischia International Journalism Award is one of the most important Italian journalism awards. It is organized under the High Patronage of the President of the Italian Republic, the Regione Campania, the Province of Naples, the National Federation of the Italian Press and the Italian Order of Journalists. It takes place in the city of Ischia.

The award was founded in 1980 by Giuseppe Valentino (1926–1988).

== History ==
"A recognition to those who have sought and told, over an entire career, his own truth through the means of mass communication. A prize for Ischia that has always been a crossroads of different cultures, a bridge between the cultural tradition European and Mediterranean." So wrote Joseph Valentino when thirty years ago he gave birth to the first edition of the Ischia. And the event has always remained true to the spirit of that time: in thirty years has followed the unfolding of the chronicles of information growing hand in hand with the development of a society where communication has a growing role. And the evidence of this commitment is represented in the roll of gold which contains the main protagonists of the Italian and international media for the last three decades. It was founded in 1980 by Giuseppe Valentino, Ischia journalist in love with his island. An active love, rich in perspective. If, in fact, from the beginning, the Prize has sought to emphasize the importance of the release of information by giving awards to its best brands, value and professional ethics of journalists chosen, he also wanted to draw attention to the place of the award-stage, Ischia. It stood out in recent years to an intense cultural activity aimed mainly to journalism and the relationship between the world of information and other areas of culture and economy.

== Awarded journalists ==
Year	Name	Notes
1980	Indro Montanelli	special awards
1981	Jean Lewis	
1982	Maurice Kettneker	
1983	Liliane Palette	
1984	Giorgio Bocca	
1985	Alberto Ronchey	
1986	Enzo Biagi	
1987	Giulio Andreotti	
1988	Joaquin Navarro Valls	
1989	Giovanni Spadolini	
1990	Harrison Salisbury	
1991	Peter Arnett	
1992	Demetrio Volcic	
1993	Ugo Stille	
1994	Ezio Mauro	
1995	Walter Cronkite	
1996	Eugenio Scalfari	
1997	Indro Montanelli	
1998	Candido Cannavò	
1999	Jean Marie Colombani	
2000	Paolo Mieli	
2001	Arrigo Levi	
2002	Peter Stothard	
2003	Ferruccio De Bortoli	
2004	Jesús Ceberio	
2005	Giovanni di Lorenzo	
2006	Jean Daniel	
2007	David Grossman	
2008	Timothy Garton Ash	
2009	Armando Valladares	
2009	Armando Valladares	
2010	John Simpson	
2011	Syed Saleem Shahzad	
2012	Martin Wolf	
2013	Francesco Guerrera	
2014	Lina Ben Mehnni	
2015	Ignazio Escolar	
2016	Can Dündar	
2017	Svjatlana Aleksievič	
2018	Zina Hamu	
2019	Grigory Pasko	
2020	Andrea Frazzetta	
2021	Alessandra Galloni	
2022	Lucio Caracciolo	
2023	John Van den Heuvel	
2024	Amy Khazim	
2025	Anton Troianovskiv	
2026	The Guardian	
