= José Ortega Spottorno =

Spanish journalist and publisher (1916–2002)

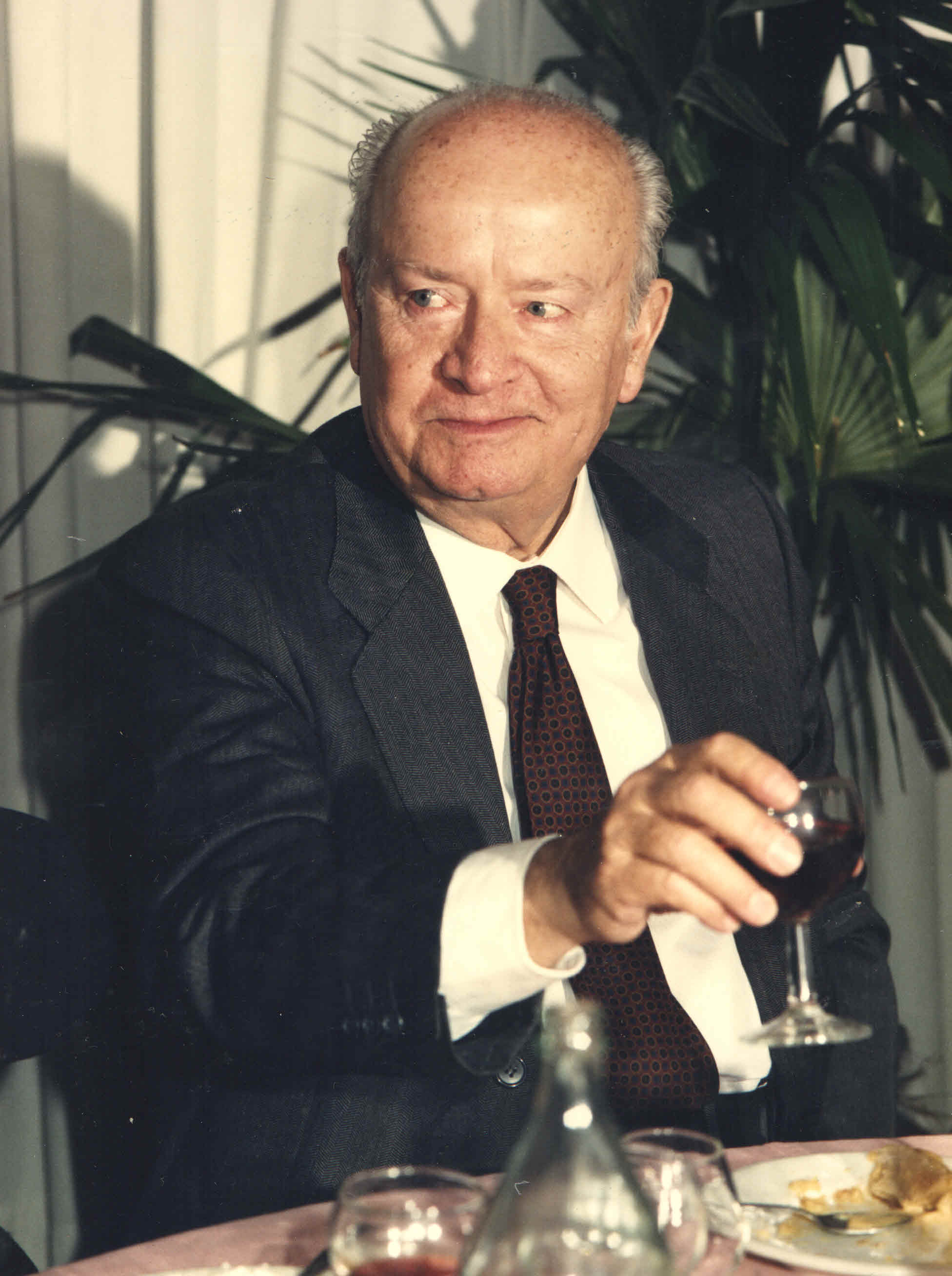
Ortega Spottorno (1988)

José Ortega Spottorno (Spanish pronunciation: [xose oɾˈteɣa spoˈtoɾno]; November 13, 1916 – February 18, 2002) was a Spanish journalist and publisher. Born in Madrid to famous philosopher José Ortega y Gasset and Rosa Spottorno Topete, José Ortega Spottorno was the founder of affordable paperback publishing firm Alianza Editorial and the Spanish daily newspaper El País, which quickly became the bestselling Spanish newspaper, a crown it holds to this day.

== Early life ==
Ortega Spottorno was born and educated in Madrid, studying at the Baccalaureate School of the Institute of Madrid. This education has been described as setting the course for the rest of his life, emphasising as it liberalism and secularism. With the outbreak of the Spanish Civil War, Ortega Spottorno's family became voluntary exiles, moving first to Geneva and then to Paris. While Ortega Spottorno returned to Madrid after the Civil War had ended, his father travelled to and stayed in Latin America, where he became a professor at the University of San Marcos in Lima and from where he returned to Spain only after the end of World War II in 1946. In his father's absence, Ortega Spottorno relaunched La Revista de Occidente (The Review of the West), the monthly cultural magazine founded by Ortega y Gasset in 1923. Despite training as an agronomist and maintaining a key interest in the sciences throughout his life, it was this role as editor of La Revista de Occidente which established how he would spend the rest of his life: writing and publishing at the very forefront of the industry in Spain.

== Publishing ==
1966 saw Ortega Spottorno establish the publishing house Alianza Editorial, which was intended to bring reading to the masses in Spain by publishing both classics and new literature from Spanish and foreign writers in the affordable paperback format. Alianza Editorial's books were noted for their sharp design and impressive appearance, a feature deliberately used by Ortega Spottorno in an attempt to inspire people to read, something especially important in a country where reading was not a popular pastime.

While it was possible to found Alianza Editorial under Franco's rule, Ortega Spottorno's next project could not take place until the end of the Francoist State in Spain. The death of Spain's caudillo Francisco Franco in 1975 gave Ortega Spottorno his chance to launch, in his words, a "liberal...independent, socially concerned [and] European" newspaper for the new post-Franco Spain. El País was founded in May 1976 with its founder Ortega Spottorno as editor, and quickly rose to attain the highest circulation of any newspaper in Spain. Described as "the banner of Spain's democratic transition", El País immediately took on a very strong pro-amnesty stance, demanding the freeing from jail of all those imprisoned by Franco for political crimes.

== Later life and death ==
Ortega Spottorno was briefly a member of the constitutional assembly which crafted Spain's new democratic constitution, between 1977 and 1979. He was married to Simone Ortega, and they had three children, one of whom works as a journalist for El País.

Ortega Spottorno stepped down from the board of El País in 1984, accepting an honorary chairmanship to acknowledge his role in founding the paper. On leaving the post, he explained that while it was prudent for those in power to "surrender their weapons before they reach old age", he also had selfish reasons for the move: to write. Between leaving El País and his death, Ortega Spottorno published three novels and was close to finishing his magnum opus, a history of the Ortega family, when he died of cancer in 2002.

== See also ==
- Francoist Spain
- Spanish transition to democracy
