= Diario AS =

Spanish sports newspaper

- Type: Daily sports newspaper
- Format: Tabloid
- Owner: PRISA
- Founder: Luis Montiel Balanzat
- Publisher: Ignacio Díez
- Editor: Vicente Jimenez
- Founded: 6 December 1967; 58 years ago
- Language: Spanish
- Headquarters: Madrid, Spain
- Circulation: 214,654 (2006)
- Sister newspapers: El País; Cinco Días
- ISSN: 1888-6671
- Website: as.com

Diario AS (Spanish pronunciation: [ˈdjaɾjo ˈas]) (sometimes stylized as AS or As; Spanish pronunciation: [ˈas]) is a Spanish daily sports newspaper that concentrates particularly on association football.

== Profile ==
Diario AS is part of PRISA which also owns El País and Cinco Días. The paper particularly covers news of the Community of Madrid football teams: Real Madrid, Atlético Madrid, Getafe CF, CD Leganés, and Rayo Vallecano. It competes directly with Marca. In addition to Madrid, the newspaper also has satellite bureaus in Barcelona, Bilbao, A Coruña, Seville, Valencia, and Zaragoza.

In May 2012, the newspaper launched an English language sub-site offering original journalism and articles translated from the original Spanish by native English-language speakers, as well as their own content. The circulation of Diario AS was 181,172 copies in 2001 and 176,892 copies in 2002. It rose to 214,654 copies in 2006.

== MeriStation ==
MeriStation is a digital magazine dedicated to video games, operated as a subdirectory of AS since 2011.
