= Enrique Miret Magdalena =

Spanish theologian and academic

Enrique Miret Magdalena (12 January 1914 – 12 October 2009) was a lay theologian who specialised in ethics and sociology. He was professor of Ethics at Universidad Complutense de Madrid.

He published some 25 books and wrote for the journal Triunfo for 20 years, as well as for other publications.
