= Alianza Editorial =

Spanish publishing house

- Founded: 1966
- Founder: José Ortega Spottorno
- Country of origin: Spain
- Fiction genres: Narrative and essay
- Official website: alianzaeditorial.es

Alianza Editorial is a Spanish publishing house founded in 1966 by José Ortega Spottorno, "with the idea of serving the intellectual aspirations of Spanish society of the time and represents a reference for various generations of readers who have known authors such as Clarín, Jorge Luis Borges, Bertolt Brecht, Marcel Proust, Sigmund Freud, García Lorca, Albert Camus, Heinrich Heine, Hermann Hesse and Franz Kafka". Since 1989, Alianza has belonged to Grupo Anaya and is among other brands, Cátedra, Algaida, Eudemo and Ediciones Siruela—which, in turn, is part of Hachette Livre, of the Lagardère Group.

== History ==
Alianza began its journey with the Pocket Book collection, intended to be a basic library for anybody interested in culture. It maintains that its offerings support every class of reader, "...from those interested in literature to the university student looking for a highly specialized monograph." In its catalogue, one can find the works of Manuel Castells, Julián Marías, Anthony Giddens, Ramón Tamames, Giovanni Sartori, Miguel Artola and Isaiah Berlin, to name only a few authors.

In the field of contemporary fiction, Alianza has opened the door to writers such as Amin Maalouf, Yasmina Khadra, Peter Handke, Ismail Kadare, Anita Desai, Pavel Kohout and György Konrád. It also draws attention to Spanish-language authors who have gained recognition through the Premio Unicaja de Novela Fernando Quiñones, a Spanish literary prize.

The libro de bosillo (Pocket Book), that features among other sub-series, forty "Bibliotecas de Autor," a series of author-centered collections --- "El libro universitario" (university books); Alianza Literaria (literature); Alianza Ensayo (encyclopedia); Alianza Música (music); Alianza Forma (modernism, Art Nouveau); Alianza Diccionarios (dictionaries); are some of their collections, in addition to Libro Singular, a series of monographs on a diverse range of topics including gastronomy, sports, leisure, health and everyday life.

In keeping with the times, at the start of 2013 they also formed a collection of some 72 works in electronic format.
