= Cinco Días =

Spanish business newspaper

- Type: Business newspaper
- Format: Tabloid
- Owner(s): PRISA
- Publisher: Estructura
- Founded: 1 March 1978; 47 years ago
- Political alignment: Left-liberal
- Language: Spanish
- Headquarters: Madrid
- Country: Spain
- Sister newspapers: El País; Diario AS
- ISSN: 1699-3594
- OCLC number: 960872690
- Website: cincodias.elpais.com

Cinco Días (Spanish: Five Days) is a business and finance newspaper published in Madrid, Spain. Founded in 1978 it is the oldest business newspaper in the country. Since 2022 its director is Amanda Mars.

== History and profile ==
Cinco Días was first published in March 1978. The reason behind the establishment of this business paper was related to the oil crisis experienced in the country in the mid-1970s. Due to this crisis Spanish society became more interested in macro economics and labor-related problems.

Cinco Días is published in tabloid format five times per week from Monday to Friday and is based in Madrid. In 1989 the paper became owned by the PRISA group which is also the owner of El País and Diario AS. The publisher of Cinco Días is Estructura, a subsidiary of Prisa Group.

Cinco Días has various supplements and includes a section for articles from The Wall Street Journal. The paper has a left-liberal stance.

== Circulation and readership ==
Cinco Días's circulation was 21,623 copies in 1994. The paper sold 28,000 copies in 2001 and 24,621 copies in 2002. The paper had a circulation of 25,041 copies on weekdays in 2003, and it rose to 29,333 copies on weekdays in 2004. The circulation of the paper increased to 30,425 copies in 2005. In 2006 its readership was 30%, making it the fifth most read business paper among Spanish men. Its circulation rose to 33,997 copies in 2006 and to 40,554 copies in 2007. The paper sold 40,554 copies in 2008. Its circulation was 40,000 copies in 2011.
