= Cuadernos para el Diálogo =

Cultural magazine in Spain (1963–1978)

- Categories: Cultural magazine
- First issue: October 1963
- Final issue: 1978
- Country: Spain
- Based in: Madrid
- Language: Spanish
- OCLC: 715917631

Cuadernos para el Diálogo (Spanish: Notebooks for Dialogue) was a monthly cultural magazine published between 1963 and 1978 in Madrid, Spain.

== History and profile ==
Cuadernos was established in October 1963 by Joaquín Ruiz-Giménez, a former minister of education under Franco. It was the first current affairs magazine of Spain. Its headquarters was in Madrid.

During its initial phase Cuadernos had a Christian democratic political leaning. However, over time it had more democratic and less Christian stance. Then it supported center-left trends and later, it became a socialist publication.

Spanish journalists who favored pluralism in the country contributed to Cuadernos. In the words of Paul Preston, the magazine was, together with Triunfo, one of two "champions of democratic ideals". During the transition to democracy it was one of the major publications focusing on the need for democratic reforms.

Cuadernos sold 30,000 copies in 1968. The magazine ceased publication at the end of 1978 due to financial problems.

== See also ==
- List of magazines in Spain
