= Grupo Santillana =

Spanish publishing house

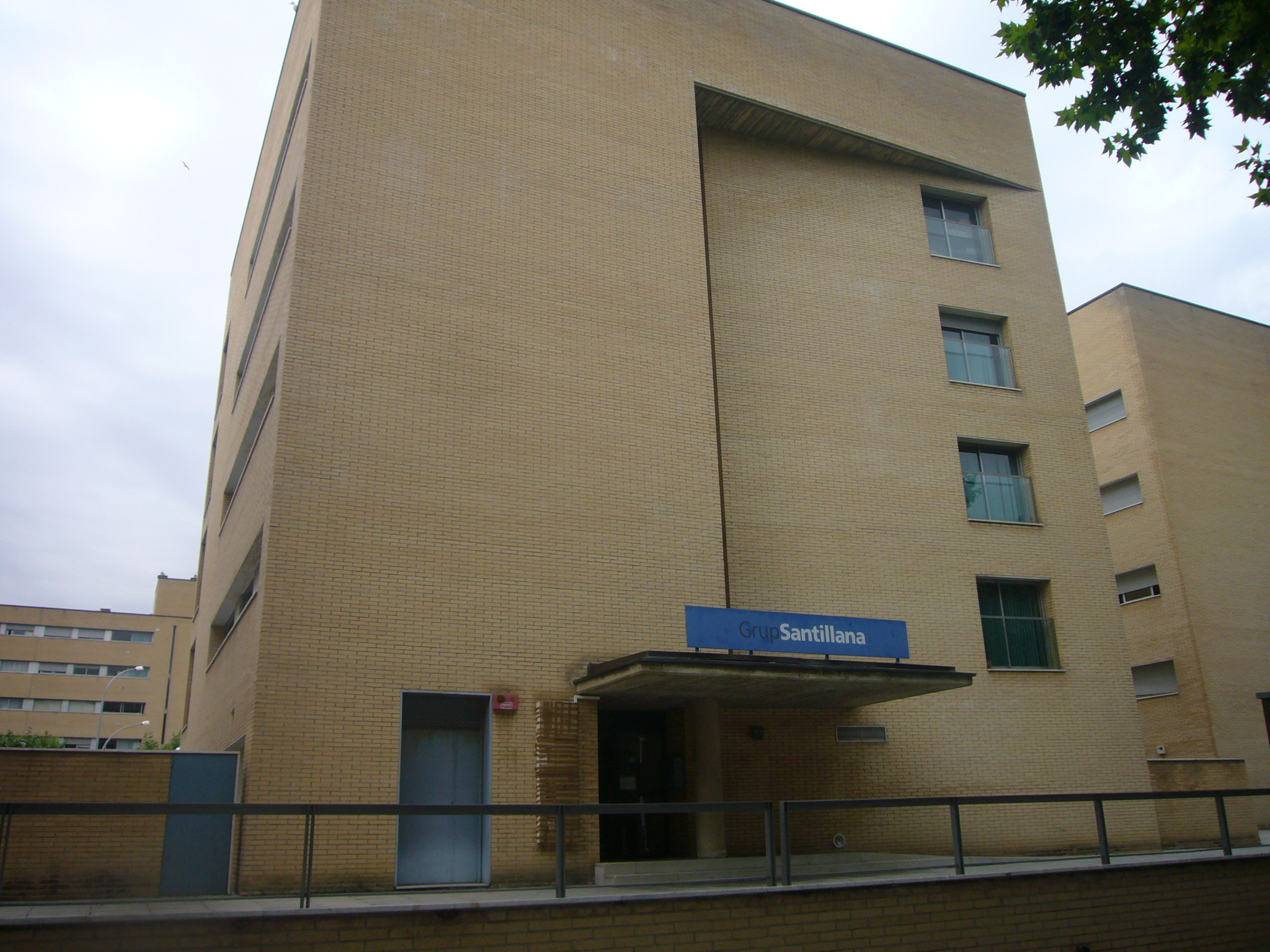
- Santillana headquarters in Barcelona
- Parent company: PRISA
- Founded: 1959
- Founders: Jesús de Polanco; Francisco Pérez González
- Country of origin: Spain
- Headquarters location: Madrid
- Official website: www.santillana.com (in Spanish)

Grupo Santillana, formerly Santillana Ediciones Generales, is a Spanish publisher founded in 1959 by Jesús de Polanco and Francisco Pérez González.

From 2008 and due to the high debts of the group PRISA, Santillana made disinvestments to guide itself. In 2008 the bookshop Crisol, with fourteen subsidiaries in Spain, two in Buenos Aires and one in Lima, closed. In 2010, Crisol was sold 25% of Santillana's shares.

In 2014 Santillana sold all its trade publishing (including the Alfaguara and Objetiva publishing houses) to Penguin Random House for €72 million. Santillana then shifted its focus towards educational publishing. On October 19, 2020, Santillana was acquired by the Finnish company Sanoma.
