= ElDiario.es =

Spanish digital paper, created in 2012

elDiario.es
- Periodismo a pesar de todo ("Journalism despite everything")
- Type: Online newspaper
- Publisher: Diario de Prensa Digital S.L.
- Editor: Ignacio Escolar
- Founded: 2012 (14 years ago)
- Political alignment: Progressivism; Left-wing
- Language: Spanish
- Headquarters: Madrid, Spain
- Website: eldiario.es

elDiario.es is a Spanish online newspaper established in 2012. It is published only in Spanish and has a progressive editorial stance with a strong emphasis on political and economic news. Journalist Ignacio Escolar founded the publication after leaving his position as director of Público's print edition.

== Business model and governance ==
Diario de Prensa Digital, S.L. is the corporate entity that publishes the newspaper. The company maintains a structural arrangement in which more than 70% of its share capital is held by its founding journalists and internal employees to insulate the newsroom from corporate and political influence.

ElDiario.es uses a hybrid revenue model that depends on commercial advertising and a community of paid subscribers known as "members," even though all online content is available for free. In return for secondary benefits like ad-free browsing and access to the publication's quarterly print magazine, "Cuadernos de elDiario.es," these members pay a recurring subscription fee to support the publication's operational funding.

== Editorial position and reception ==
The publication's reporting is classified as left to center-left by independent media observers, who also point out that its headlines sometimes use the emotionally charged framing characteristic of progressive advocacy journalism. ElDiario.es mainly depends on its own investigative reporting, although it regularly synthesizes national wire copy from Agencia EFE and has content syndication partnerships with international outlets like The Guardian.

Significant political and legal friction is occasionally caused by the publication's aggressive coverage. Notably, Escolar was fired from his cooperative position at Cadena SER in April 2016 following the publication of investigations by elDiario.es that connected Prisa executive Juan Luis Cebrián to the Panama Papers. The publication's editorial stance has also drawn domestic legal challenges. In 2026, singer Julio Iglesias filed a defamation lawsuit against Escolar and four staff journalists for their investigative reporting on alleged workplace harassment and sexual assault.

== Bibliography ==
- Rubio Jordán, Ana Virginia (2013). "La información sobre la Monarquía española en los nuevos medios digitales: Eldiario.es y Vozpopuli.com". adCommunicaː revista científica de estrategias, tendencias e innovación en comunicación. pp. 65–81.
- López García, Guillermo (2014). "La aparición de InfoLibre y eldiario.es para la defensa de un periodismo más democrático y participativo". Universidad Complutense de Madrid. pp. 491–500.
