= PRISA =

Spanish mass media corporation

Promotora de Informaciones, S.A.
- Type: Sociedad Anónima
- Traded as: BMAD: PRS
- ISIN: ES0171743117
- Industry: Broadcasting, Publishing, Media, Internet, Entertainment
- Founded: 1972; 54 years ago
- Founder: Jesús de Polanco
- Headquarters: Madrid, Spain,
- Key people: Joseph Oughourlian (Non-executive chairman); Carlos Núñez Murias (CEO of PRISA Media); Francisco Cuadrado Pérez (CEO of Santillana)
- Services: Television and radio production, press and publishing
- Revenue: ▼€6.822 billion (2020)
- Number of employees: 14,987 (2020)
- Subsidiaries: Grupo Santillana
- Website: www.prisa.com

Promotora de Informaciones, S.A. (PRISA) is a Spanish media conglomerate headquartered in Madrid, Spain. It is one of the largest media companies in Spain and in Latin America, producing a wide variety of educational, cultural and informative content. PRISA owns a portfolio of newspapers, magazines, radio stations, and television networks. The majority subsidiaries and brands of the company are El País, Los 40, and Santillana.

== History and profile ==
The PRISA group was founded in 1972 by Jesús de Polanco, who was the major shareholder and the president of the company until his death on 21 July 2007. The other founder was José Ortega Spotorno, the son of the philosopher Ortega y Gasset. The son of Jesús de Polanco, Ignacio Polanco, succeeded him as the president of PRISA. The company was established as part of the Spanish transition towards democracy.

In 2006, the share of the group in the Spanish press market was only 15%.

As of 2010, it was controlled by Nicolas Berggruen. At the end of 2010 the US hedge fund Liberty Acquisitions Holdings acquired 51% of the company.

In March 2014, Prisa sold part of the Grupo Santillana, the Alfaguara publishing house, to Penguin Random House for 72 million euros.

In 2014, the Prisa group closed the sale of its 56% stake in the Digital+ channel marketed under the name Canal+ España to Telefónica for an estimated amount of 750 million euros.

In 2016 it became known that PRISA had paid its board members 80 million Euros since 2012, despite deep cuts and layoffs in the newsrooms of El Pais, and a "95 percent crash in Prisa´s stock over the past 5 years" as well as debt of at least 1.5 billion Euros.

In July 2017, Altice announced the acquisition of Media Capital, a Portuguese company dedicated to the media, which in particular owns TVI, Prisa, for approximately 440 million euros, but which shortly after refused to sell it to Altice.

In October 2017, Juan Luis Cebrián agreed to step down after chairing PRISA for "more than three decades".

In October 2020, Santillana Spain was sold to the Finnish group Sanoma for 465 million euros, as the company announced to the National Securities Market Commission.

In January 2021, French conglomerate Vivendi announced the acquisition of a stake in the capital of Prisa, amounting to 9.9%.

== Holdings ==
=== Television ===
Prisa TV was the company's audiovisual division. In Spain, its predecessor Sogecable launched the country's first pay channel (Canal+) and the first satellite payment platform (Canal Satélite Digital/Digital+), sold in May 2015 to Telefónica, giving birth to the current Movistar Plus+ platform.

=== Newspapers ===
PRISA owns the following papers among the others

- El País: Daily newspaper. The most widely read general newspaper in Spanish. In July 2022, elpais.com's audience exceeded 18,099,000 unique users, placing it in fourth place behind eespano.com, elmundo.es and la vanguardia.com. Its printed edition has 762,000 daily readers, according to the second wave of AGE 2022.
- Diario AS: Sports newspaper. Second most read sports newspaper in Spanish. As.com's audience exceeded 17,559,000 unique users in May 2020. Its print edition has 395,000 daily readers, according to the second wave of the 2022 EGMs.
- Cinco Días: Business newspaper. Main economic press newspaper in Spain. Cincodias.com's audience exceeded 2,997,000 unique users in July 2020.
- As of 2012, the company held a 50% interest in El Huffington Post, the Spanish-language version of the news source.

=== Magazines ===
- El País Semanal: Sunday magazine.
- ICON: Men's magazine.
- S Moda: Women's magazine.

=== Radio ===
Prisa Radio is the company's radio division. It is the largest radio group in the Spanish language, with approximately 22 million listeners between Spain and Latin America.

In Spain, it owns the most listened to general radio station in the country, Cadena SER, and the music stations: Los 40 (current music), Los 40 Classic (vintage music), Los 40 Dance (electronic music), Los 40 Urban (music Latin), Cadena Dial (music in Spanish) and Radiolé (Spanish music). In Latin America, it has more than 1,250 stations, including its own, owned and associated stations, in countries such as Argentina, Chile, Colombia, Costa Rica, Panama and Mexico.

- Cadena SER: News station.
- Los 40: Contemporary hit radio station.
- Los 40 Classic: Classic hits music station.
- Los 40 Dance: Electronic dance music station (Online only).
- Los 40 Urban: Urban hits music station.
- Cadena Dial: Latin pop music station.
- Radiolé: Spanish music station.
- Caracol Radio: News station (Colombia).
- ADN Radio: News station (Chile).
- W Radio: News station (Mexico).

=== Internet ===
- El HuffPost: Web portal. Spanish edition of the American newspaper. The audience of huffpost.es exceeded 9,068,000 unique users in July 2022.

=== Audio ===
- El País Audio
- AS Audio
- SER Podcast
- Los 40 Podcast
- Dial Podcast
- Podium Podcast

=== Grupo Santillana ===
Grupo Santillana is the editorial division of the group, present in Spain and 21 Latin American countries for more than 50 years. It includes the publishing houses Santillana Educación, Moderna or Santillana Français and has three digital education systems: Sistema UNO, Santillana COMPARTIR and Santillana virtual class.

PRISA also offers educational services and content (comprehensive solutions, textbooks, digital resources, support material, etc.) at all educational stages and published in Spanish, Portuguese and English. And it also provides advice to schools, which reinforces its commitment to the 2030 Agenda and acts as a transformative agent in education, helping to create better life opportunities for millions of students.

- Santillana: creation of educational content for all training stages and appropriate to the regulations of each country.
- Share: Santillana digital ecosystem aimed at teachers and administration.
- UNOi System: platform that allows the management of the school structure and its digital content according to the needs of each school.
- CREO System: CREO prepares students to face the challenges of today's world, instilling in them Christian values that will accompany them throughout their lives and that will make them mature people who work for and for society.
- Loqueleo: young and dynamic label that collects the great children's and youth publishing collection with which Santillana has brought the best literature to schools over the last thirty years.
- Richmond: interactive and multi-format content to make learning English and Spanish as a foreign language a stimulating and effective experience

=== International assets ===
- Santillana is present in 20 countries in the Americas.
- In the United States, it owns Caracol Miami, W Radio Los Angeles and the radio content network GLR Networks. It also owns 12% of the Spanish-language cable channel V-me.
- In Mexico, it owns 50% of Radiopolis (a group that brings together radio stations like XEW-AM or Los 40. In addition, he is responsible, with Televisa, for the Mexican edition of Rolling Stone.
- In Argentina, it is a partner of Papel Prensa alongside Grupo Clarín and La Nación, making it the owners of 72% of the paper going to newspapers and magazines in Argentina.
- In Chile, it owns Ibero Americana Radio Chile, a consortium of 10 channels which concentrate more than 50% of national programming. Its brands include Radio ADN, Radio Concierto, Rock & Pop, Los 40, to name a few.
- In Colombia it has the most important talk radio systems such as Caracol Radio, W Radio and W+, in addition to the music networks Tropicana, Radioacktiva, Bésame Radio, Los 40, Los 40 Urban and Radio Santa Fe.
- In Costa Rica, it operates the stations VIVA Radio, Los 40 and Bésame Radio in collaboration with Grupo Nación and the Mexican company Multimedios.
- In Ecuador, it maintains an agreement with the RGAW Comunicación group to operate Los 40 in that country.
- In Panama, the general radio station Radio Panamá and the radio show Los 40 operate.
- In Bolivia, it previously held the assets of the Garafulic group (ATB, La Razón, Extra, El Nuevo Día, Bolivision, Radio Televisión Popular, Bolivia.com, among others) from 2002 until its subsequent sale to Aikashi Investiments in 2009.

== Organization ==
=== Sources ===
In 2021, PRISA Media presented its new organizational structure,+ its Upper management, its Board of Directors and Board Committees: and its Santillana management team.

Direction	Area
High direction
Carlos Nunez Murias	Executive Chairman of Prisa Media
Francisco Antonio Cuadrado Pérez	Executive Chairman of Santillana
Pablo Jiménez de Parga Maseda	Secretary of the Board of Directors
Maria Pilar Gil Miguel	Financial department
Jorge Rivera Garcia	Business management and institutional relations
Rosa Junquera Santiago	Sustainable Development Department
Marta Bretos Serrano	People and talent management
Ana Ortas-Pau	Communication Department
Virginia Fernández Iribarnegaray	Internal Audit Department
Prisa Media
Carlos Nunez Murias	Executive Chairman
Enric Hernández Llorente	Deputy to the President (Responsible for corporate development)
Fernando Garcilaso de la Vega	Vice President of Prisa Media
Vanessa Hernández Ferreiro	General Manager of Operations
Javier Munoz Martinez	General Director of the Legal Department
Maria Luisa Manzano Porteros	General Sales Director
Juan Antonio Canton Molina	General Press Director ( El País, As, Cinco Días and El HuffPost )
Ignacio Soto Perez	General Director of Radio in Spain (Cadena SER, Los 40 y Cadena Dial)
Maria Jose Bueno Marquez	Director of El País
Vicente Jimenez Navas	Director of As
David Fernández Sanchidrián	Director of ElHuffPost
Amanda Mars Checa	Director of Cinco Dias
María Montserrat Domínguez Montoli	Cadena SER Content Director
José Luis Gutiérrez Cuéllar	Managing Director of Digital and Technology
Francisco Javier Llorente Campos	Managing Director of Video
Maria Jesus Espinosa de los Monteros	General Manager of Audio
Vicent Argudo Esteve	General Director of Music
Luis Baena Reig	Managing Director of Marketing and Audiences
Cristina Gonzalo Orchando	Commercial, Product and Innovation Marketing Director
Jesus Aspra Rodriguez	Marketing Director
Manuel Anton Castro Sanjurjo	Director of Transformation and Customer Service
Felipe Cabrales Urdaneta	CEO in America
Juan Andrés Varela Varela	Director in the United States
Francisco Enrique Cabanas Soria	Director in Mexico
Ricardo Berdichesky Sommerfeld	Director in Chile
Antonio Yélamo Crespillo	Director at Prisa Media in Andalucía
José María Tejerina Sánchez	Director at Prisa Media in Aragón
Pablo González-Palacios Ortea	Director at Prisa Media in Asturias
Josep Roquer Zaragoza	Director at Prisa Media in the Balearic Islands
Lourdes Santana Navarro	Director at Prisa Media in Canarias
Monica Revilla Sierra	Director at Prisa Media in Cantabria
Felix Amaya Fernandez	Director at Prisa Media in Castilla-La Mancha
Ramiro Martin Vega	Director at Prisa Media in Castilla y León
Jaume Serra Saguer	Director at Prisa Media in Cataluña
Bernardo Guzman Montoro	Director at Prisa Media in the Comunidad Valenciana
Angel Blanco Escudero	Director at Prisa Media in Extremadura
Mario Moreno Gil	Director at Prisa Media in Galicia
Domingo Camacho Fernández	Director at Prisa Media in Murcia
Javier Hoyos Garcia	Director at Prisa Media in Navarra and La Rioja
María Begoña Marañón Unanue	Director at Prisa Media in the Country Vasco
Alejandro Elortegui Escartin	Engine and New Projects Director
Fernando Hernández Puente	Design Director
Raul Romojaro Martin-Caro	Deputy Engine Director
José María Delgado Jiménez	Assistant Director of Music
Ramon Tapias	Director of Cadena Dial, Radiolé and Los 40 Classic
Miguel Angel Corral Salas	Director of Musical Events
Santillana
Francisco Antonio Cuadrado Pérez	executive chairman of Santillana
Julio Alonso Pena	Operational Managing Director
José Málaga Cochella	Global Chief Technology Officer
Luciano Dias Monteiro	Director of Communication and Sustainable Development
Raquel González González	Global Marketing Director
Nuria Quevedo Ruiz	Global Human Resources Director
Miguel Garcia de Antelo	Director General of Private Enterprises
Luis Guillermo Bernal Ramirez	Director of Global Content
Maria del Carmen Eulalia Pajares	Global Finance and Controlling Director
Alberto Muñoz Céspedes	Managing Director of Santillana Editores Portugal
Jose Angelo Xavier de Oliveira	Managing Director of Moderna Brazil
José Henrique del Castillo Melo	Global Director of Private Affairs in Brazil
Alejandro Nestor Avakian	Managing Director of Moderna Solutions Brazil
Alberto Polanco Blanco	Mexico General Manager (Private Company)
David Delgado of Robles de la Peña	Director General of Mexico (Public Enterprises)
Luis Alonso Gonzalez	General Manager for North Central America (Guatemala, Honduras and El Salvador)
Pedro Luis Ayuso Gil	Director General of the Dominican Republic
Victor Perez	Deputy Director General of Puerto Rico
Diego Cerutti	General Manager of South Central America (Costa Rica, Panama and Venezuela)
Arturo Ortega	CEO of Venezuela
Eduardo Rafael Echeverría Correa	CEO of Colombia
Rodrigo de la Ossa Izquierdo	CEO of Santillana Colombia
Diego Alberto Idarraga	Director of Norma Colombia
Alex Guerrero	CEO of Ecuador
Fernando Martin Esteves Fros	CEO of Peru
Carola Ossio Bustillos	CEO of Bolivia
Alejandro Solari Olivera	General Manager of Chile (Private company)
Mauricio Montenegro Lopez	Director General of Chile (Public Enterprises)
Ivonne Petersen Middleton	CEO of Paraguay
Fernando Rama Falero	CEO of Uruguay
Jose Linán Lozano	CEO of Argentina
Board of Directors and Board Committees
Joseph Marie Oughourlian (Director and Owner of Amber Active Investors Limited, 12/18/15)	Chairman of the Board of Directors and of the Executive Committee
Miguel Ángel Barroso Ayats (owner director representing Amber Capital UK LLP, 3/22/18)	Member of the Board of Directors and of the Sustainable Development Commission
Francisco Cuadrado Pérez (executive advisor, 7/27/21)	Member of the Board of Directors and the Commission of Delegates
Béatrice de Clermont-Tonnerre (independent director, 3/6/19)	Member of the Board of Directors and the Delegates and Sustainable Development Committee, coordinating director and chairman of the Nomination, Remuneration and Corporate Governance Committee
Carmen Fernández de Alarcón Roca (exclusive director for Vivendi, 6/29/21)	Member of the Board of Directors and the Nomination, Remuneration and Corporate Governance, Audit, Risk and Compliance and Sustainable Development Committees
María Pilar Gil Miguel (executive advisor, 2/28/23)	Member of the Board of Directors and the Commission of Delegates
María José Marín Rey-Stolle (independent director, 2/23/21)	Member of the Board of Directors and the Delegates and Audit, Risk and Compliance Committees
Carlos Núñez Murías (executive advisor, 6/29/21)	Member of the Board of Directors and the Commission of Delegates
Manuel Polanco Moreno (exclusive manager for Rucandio, 4/19/01)	Member of the Board of Directors and the Commission of Delegates
María Teresa Quirós Álvarez (independent director, 11/30/21)	Member of the Board of Directors and of the Sustainable Development Committee and Chairman of the Audit, Risks and Compliance Committee
Javier Santiso Guimaras (independent director, 12/22/20)	Member of the Board of Directors and of the Committee of Delegates and of the Nomination, Remuneration and Corporate Governance Committee
Andrés Varela Entrecanales (exclusive director for Global Alconaba, 7/9/22)	Member of the Board of Directors
Fernando Carrillo Pérez (independent director, 6/28/23)	Member of the Board of Directors
Isabel Sánchez García (independent director, 6/28/23)	Member of the Board of Directors
Pablo Jiménez de Parga Maseda	Secretary of the Board of Directors and delegated committees, Audit, Risks and Compliance, Appointments, Remuneration and Corporate Governance and Sustainable Development

== Shareholding ==
Shareholding of the Prisa group as of January 22, 2021 ,
Shareholder	Key characters	Go
Amber Capital UK LLP	Joseph Oughourlian	29.84%
Vivendi SE	Vincent Bolloré	9.93%
Telefonica SA	Jose Maria Alvarez-Pallete	9.44%
Polanco family (Rucandio SA)	Ignacio Polanco	7.61%
Khalid Thani Abdullah Al Thani		5.13%
GHO Networks SA de CV	Roberto Alcántara Rojas	5.01%
Inversora de Carso, SA de CV		4.30%
Banco Santander SA		4.14%
Carlos Fernández González		4.02%
Melqart Opportunities Master Fund Ltd		2.20%
Polygon European Equity Opportunity Master Fund		1.10%

== See also ==
- Media of Spain
- Books in Spain
