= Jesús de Polanco =

Spanish businessman

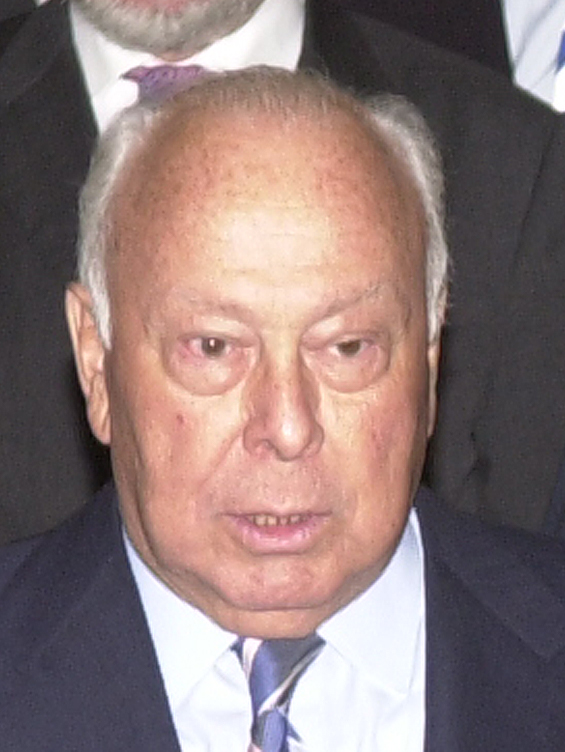
Jesús Polanco Gutiérrez in 2006

Jesús Polanco Gutiérrez, also known as Jesús de Polanco (November 7, 1929 – July 21, 2007), was a businessman from Spain who built one of the largest media empires in the world. In 2005, he was ranked 3rd richest person in Spain and at number 210 in Forbes World's Richest People list, and was number 258 in 2006.

== Media holdings ==
Born in Madrid to a military family from Santillana del Mar, Cantabria, Polanco was estimated to own 64% of the Prisa group, a conglomerate which includes El País; the radio channel Cadena SER; the TV channel Cuatro (TV), the digital TV platform Digital+ (including Canal+), which has a monopoly on Spain's digital TV and a number of radio channels and local televisions. Prisa also had important interests in editing books and owned Grupo Santillana, Ediciones El País, El País Aguilar, Alfaguara, Altea, Tiendas Crisol, I.B. Tauris and Richmon Publishing. His nickname became 'Jesús del Gran Poder' for his role behind the political scene.

Polanco's media interests were known for being progressive or left-wing. More conservative and clerical rivals in the media, such as the newspapers ABC and El Mundo or the radio station COPE, have at times accused Polanco's related media of having a monopoly on Spanish information and being capable of presenting biased reporting. Some of these have also accused PRISA of influencing public opinion against the People's Party (PP) government's management and response to the Madrid train bomb attacks of March 11, 2004. The People's Party, led into the campaign by Mariano Rajoy, ultimately lost the 2004 Spanish elections to the Spanish Socialist Workers' Party (PSOE), led by José Luis Rodríguez Zapatero.

In 2005 Prisa asked the Spanish Government for a license to transform the pay TV channel Canal+ into an open channel. The Government conceded this license and Cuatro (TV) channel started broadcasting in November 2005. Subsequently, opposition was expressed about the lack of dialogue on this subject.

In 2007, responding to the accusations of his media being biased, Polanco said that it was difficult to be impartial when there is a party which would do anything to go back into power. The Spanish People's Party reacted by promoting a boycott of all Polanco's media channels and shareholders. This initiative was criticised by all European democratic parties.

On July 21, 2007 Polanco died at the age of 77 in Madrid.
