= Juan Luis Cebrián =

Spanish journalist & writer (born 1944)

The Most Excellent Juan Luis Cebrián
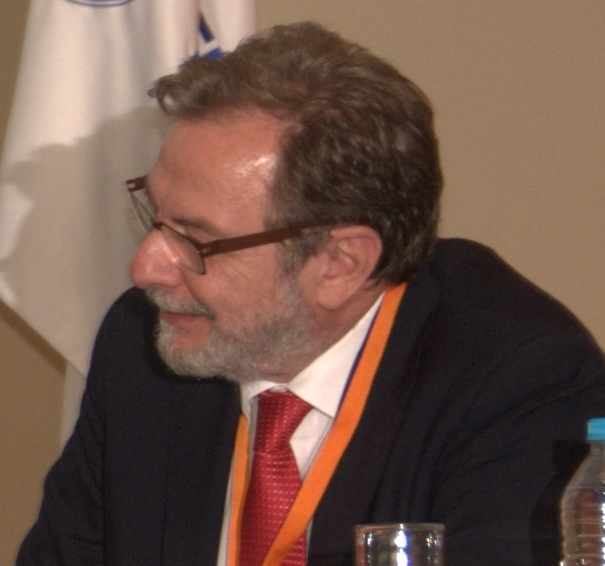

Chairman of Prisa
- In office 2012–2017

Vice president of the Asociación de Medios de Información
- Incumbent
- Assumed office May 2017

Seat V of the Real Academia Española
- Incumbent
- Assumed office 18 May 1997 (Note: Elected on 19 December 1996)
- Preceded by: Emilio García Gómez

Personal details
- Born: Juan Luis Cebrián Echarri; 30 October 1944 (age 82) Madrid, Spain
- Parent: Vicente Cebrián (father)
- Education: Universidad Complutense
- Occupation: Journalist, business and writer

Juan Luis Cebrián Echarri (born 30 October 1944) is a Spanish journalist and businessman, the co-founder of El País. He was CEO of Prisa, a Spanish media conglomerate, from 2012 to 2017, until ousted by Joseph Oughourlian.

== Early life and education ==
Cebrián was born in Madrid in 1944. He studied philosophy at the Universidad Complutense, and earned a bachelor's degree from the Escuela Oficial de Periodismo.

== Career ==
He was one of the founding members of the political magazine Cuadernos para el Dialogo and worked from 1963 to 1975 as a senior worker and deputy editor of daily newspaper Pueblo and Informaciones de Madrid.

He was the founding editor of the daily newspaper El País, in which he edited from 1976 and 1988. Between 1986 and 1988 he was the chairman of the International Press Institute (I.P.I) .

In December 1996, Cebrián was elected to Seat V of the Real Academia Española, and took up his seat in May 1997.

He was chairman of PRISA from 2012 to 2017. Details of his dismissal were not clear in 2017. Cebrián left all his executive positions in PRISA on May 21, 2018.

Since May 2017, Cebrian has been vice president of the Asociación de Medios de Información (AMI), chaired by Javier Moll.

In April 2024, Cebrián was dismissed as honorary president of El País, after he signed on to the digital periodical "The Objective".

Cebrián managed the news service Televisión Española.

Various international media have considered Cebrián one of the ten most influential Spaniards in Spain and Latin America for 44 years (from 1976 to 2019).

He has been the only Hispanic academic member of the Bilderberg Club and the only Spanish-speaking member with executive functions in that organization.

Between 1980 and 2016 Cebrián published 19 books in Spanish consisting of fiction and essay based writing, including the first part of his memoirs.

== Controversies ==
Cebrián has been mentioned in the Panama Papers. La Sexta revealed in 2016, that he owned 2% of Star Petroleum, an oil corporation with offshore tax havens. After the publication, he decided to take legal action against La Sexta.
