= Simona Levi =

Spanish-Italian artist and activist (born 1966)

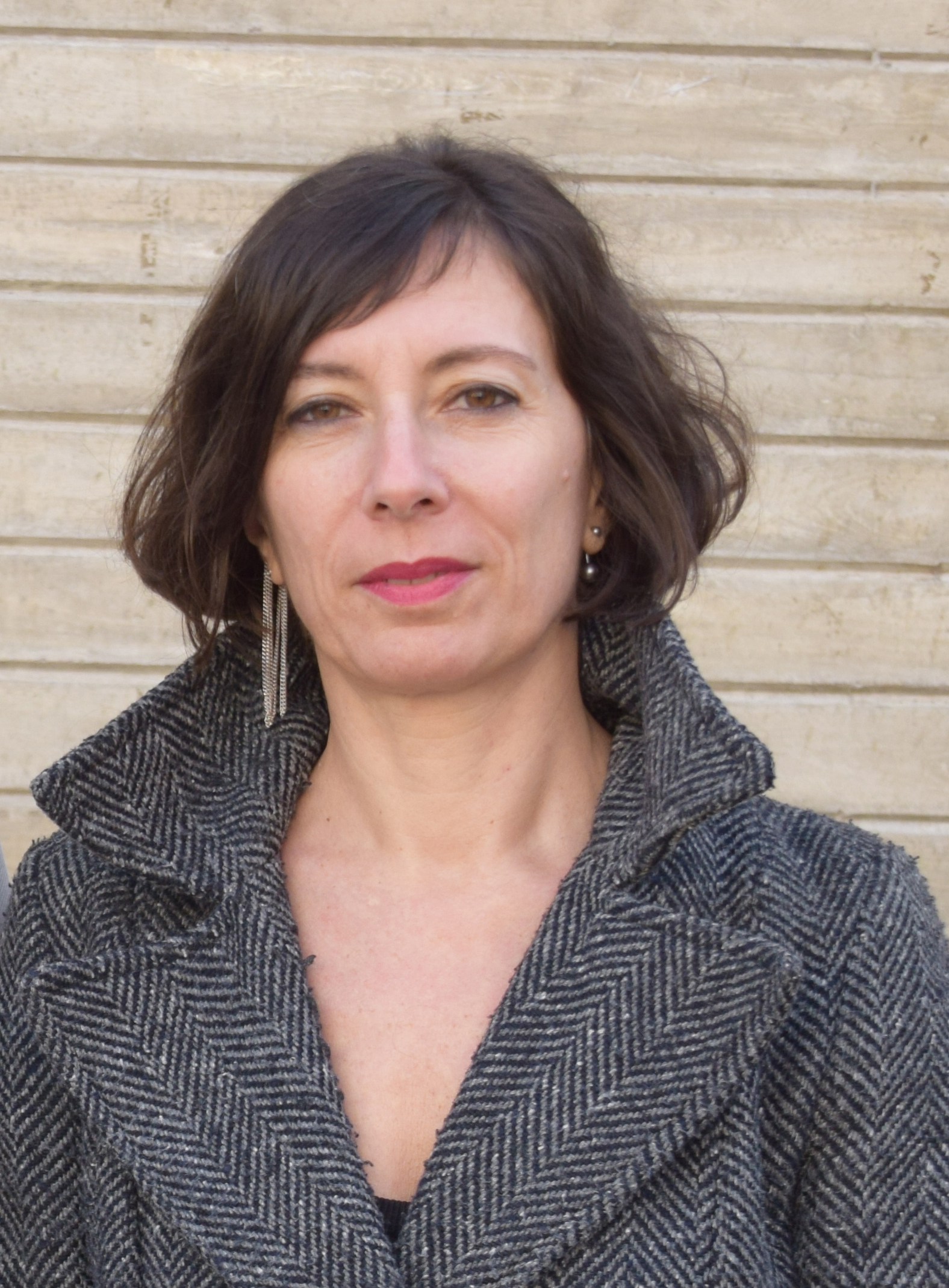
- Born: July 23, 1966; Turin, Italy
- Known for: Activism, Performing arts

Simona Levi (born July 23, 1966) is a Spanish-Italian theatre director, playwright, activist, technopolitical strategist, cultural manager and curator, and lecturer. Born in Italy and with Spanish nationality, she has been living in Barcelona, Spain, since 1990. She is an activist in the field of freedom of expression and information, digital rights, the free flow of culture and knowledge, strategic use of digital tools for collective action, institutional accountability, protection of whistleblowers and the fight against corruption and disinformation. She has also participated in movements in defence of the right to housing and use of public space.

== Career ==
She is one of the founders of Xnet, the Free Culture Forum, the anticorruption movement 15MpaRato, and the Citizens Group against Corruption at both Catalan and Spanish levels. Simona Levi leads the Plan for the Democratic Digitalisation of Education at Xnet (since 2019), a project aimed at replacing proprietary tools from major tech corporations in educational centers. As a result of this work, in 2021 the Office of Publications of the European Union published the report Proposal for a Sovereign and Democratic Digitalisation of Europe at the request of the President of the European Parliament, David Sassoli. The Spanish-language version of this plan, titled Digitalización democrática. Soberanía digital para las personas, was released in September 2024 by Raig Verd (Colección Ciclogènesi).

Simona Levi is coordinator and co-author of #FakeYou, Fake news and disinformation – Governments, political parties, mass media, corporations, big fortunes: monopolies of information manipulation and cuts to freedom of expression, published by Rayo Verde (2019). She also coauthored Votar y Cobrar – La impunidad como forma de gobierno, published by Capitán Swing (2017), Tecnopolítica, internet y r-evoluciones – Sobre la centralidad de redes digitales en el #15M, and served as editor of Cultura libre digital – Nociones básicas para defender lo que es de todxs, both of which were published in 2012 by Icaria.

She is the academic director of the Postgraduate Course in Technopolitics and Rights, first offered at Pompeu Fabra University and, since 2020, at the University of Barcelona.

In 2017, Rolling Stone magazine chose Simona Levi, as the founder of Xnet and for her work with 15MpaRato, as one of 25 people in the world who are shaping the future.

Simona Levi has been leading Xnet's Democratic Digitalization of Education Plan since 2019 to replace the proprietary tools from big tech companies in schools. As a result of this experience, in 2021, she published for the Publications Office of the European Union the report "Proposal for a sovereign and democratic digitalisation of Europe" at the request of the President of the European Parliament.

Simona Levi of Xnet in the dialogue "Internet access, a new human right"

== Artistic career ==
A theatre director, actress and dancer by training, Simona Levi studied performing arts at the Jacques Lecoq School in Paris, where she worked as a programmer in the squatter arts space L’oeil du Cyclone. She started touring as an actress with several companies in 1982, eventually settling in Barcelona in 1990. In 1994 she set up Conservas in the city's Raval neighborhood. This is a venue promoting local, innovative, independent performing arts based on a self-production paradigm.

In 1999, she founded Compañía Conservas, and that same year the company presented its first stage production, Femina Ex Machina, directed by Levi and Dominique Grandmougin. The piece was awarded the FAD Special Critics Price and the Aplaudiment Award, and toured extensively to festivals and theatres in Europe (Spain, France, the United Kingdom, Switzerland, Italy, Slovenia, Norway, among others) for more than two years. In 2003, again with Dominique Grandmougin, she directed the company's second production, 7 Dust, which premièred at Mercat de les Flors in Barcelona. The production toured through several European countries, including Italy, France, Belgium, Switzerland, Finland, Slovenia and Poland.

In 2007, with Marc Sampere, she co-directed the third show by Compañia Conservas, Realidades Avanzadas, which questioned representative democracy and the concept of property. This work is based on the open-source model. At the end of the performance, audience members could take home a CD-ROM with the texts, videos, music and images used in the show. The idea for the production was sparked by a video posted on YouTube in October 2006 that denounced real estate speculation and included footage recorded with a hidden camera in the anti-mobbing office at Barcelona City Council. The video was removed from YouTube at the request of the bank La Caixa, which alleged copyright infringement based on the use of images of one of its branches.

From 2001 to 2011, Simona Levi directed the Performing and Applied Arts Festival InnMotion, which is held at the Centre de Cultura Contemporània de Barcelona. [From 2008 to 2013 she directed the stage production of the oXcars.

She is scriptwriter and director of the play Hazte Banquero - Tarjetas Black: todo lo que quisieron ocultarte (Become a Banker: Black Cards, Everything They Wanted to Hide from You), a documentary looking at the “black credit cards” corruption case and revealing the modus operandi of the top management of the bank Caja Madrid by means of a selection of 447 emails sent to and by the bank's president Miguel Blesa. The work premiered in July 2016 in the Poliorama Theatre, Barcelona, as part of the city's Grec Festival and has also been performed in several venues including the Fernán Gómez Theatre in Madrid and the Rosalía de Castro Theatre in A Coruña. After seeing the show in Madrid, the HSBC whistleblower Hervé Falciani said that he could “see the future” in this dramatisation of data.

In 2018, she directed the play Advanced Realities 2, which premiered at the Festival Grec de Barcelona.

== Activism ==
Simona Levi is one of the founders of eXgae (now Xnet), a non-profit association created in 2008 which explores alternative models for cultural diffusion, copyright and democracy in the digital age. Since 2008, Xnet, with the support of Conservas, has organised the annual oXcars, a non-competitive awards ceremony, which places the spotlight on projects created in different arts disciplines based on the paradigm of free culture.

As a member of Xnet, she is staging director of the oXcars and also coordinator of the FCForum, an international arena in which organisations and experts in the field of free/libre knowledge and culture work towards creating a global strategic framework for action and coordination. She is also a founding member of Red Sostenible (Sustainable Network), a citizen platform created in January 2010 to combat the introduction of the anti-download legislation known as the “Sinde Law” in Spain, and to defend Internet rights.

In 2010, she appeared before the Spanish Parliamentary Sub-Committee on Intellectual Property Law reform to defend the proposals contained in the “Charter for Innovation, Creativity and Access to Knowledge”, a document that was drafted collectively by participants of the FCForum. In her presentation, she offered an overview of some of the omissions in the legislation and put forward possible solutions included in the Charter, such as the abolition of Spain's levy for private copying or “canon digital” and the need to reform copyright collecting societies which, she pointed out, “hinder the free circulation of knowledge and sustainability for authors.”

Simona Levi is a member of the 15M movement in Spain and founder of the group 15MpaRato, which filed a lawsuit against the banker and former IMF Managing Director Rodrigo Rato, an action that launched the Bankia trial in Spain after an anonymous source used the Xnet anticorruption mailbox to give access to the web domain http://correosdeblesa.com with more than 8,000 emails from the Inbox of Miguel Blesa, president of Caja Madrid from 1996 to 2009. These revealed, for the first time, the existence of the so-called Black Cards (tax-free, corporate credit cards for associates of Caja Madrid–Bankia), how the bank bought and sold the City National Bank of Florida, and how the bank's customers were defrauded by the preferred stock scheme. In June 2015, Xnet published a selection of the Blesa emails through four online media sources. The Spanish National Court admitted the case and charged Rodrigo Rato and the former board of directors with fraud, falsification of accounts in order to attract investment, and improper management, among other crimes.

Simona Levi is a member of the Grupo Ciudadano contra la Corrupción (Citizens Group against Corruption), a network which works at both Catalan and Spanish levels to strengthen already-existing initiatives to protect whistleblowers, coordinate them and facilitate exchange of information among them.

In 2015–2016, as a member of the Advisory Council of the Barcelona City Hall Office for Transparency and Best Practices, she initiated and worked to install the Ethical and Good Governance Box, a complaints box by means of which citizens can report corruption and other practices that are damaging for good governance in the city of Barcelona. This mailbox, similar to that already produced by Xnet, is the first such box to be promoted by a government (in this case that of the city of Barcelona). Once the mailbox was presented in public, Levi announced her resignation from the advisory board. She advises several institutions such as the Government of Spain, the Government of Catalonia and the City Council of Barcelona.

Proposal for a Democratic Digitalisation of Europe – European Parliament

Simona Levi – Gala Innovation in Politics 1/21 – Democracy 1

Simona Levi – Gala Innovation in Politics 1/2 – Democracy 2

Since 2019, together with a group of families, Levi has designed and leads Xnet's Plan for Democratic Digitalization of Education. This project includes:

- The development of a comprehensive, auditable, agile and interoperable IT tool called DD (Digital Democratic) to replace the proprietary tools in all the activity of the schools. This tool has already been implemented in 11 schools in the city of Barcelona since 2021, in collaboration with the Directorate of Democratic Innovation of the City Council and the Consortium of Education of the city.
- A program of reform of the educational system for digital training that started with the I International Congress on Democratic Digital Education and Open Edtech (2022), directed by Levi and recognized as teacher training by the Department of Education of the government of Catalonia.

As a consequence of this project, in 2021 and at the request of the President of the European Parliament, Levi published for the Publications Office of the European Union the report "Proposal for a sovereign and democratic digitalisation of Europe".

Simona Levi and her Xnet team have been the subject of a documentary entitled "L'escletxa" directed by David Fernandez de Castro and produced by Bettina Walter in 2021. The documentary was produced by the Catalan public television as part of the documentary program "Sense Ficció".

She participates as a speaker and expert at national and international events, where she talks about the Xnet project, and the state of free culture, digital rights and technopolitics. These events include the Ministerial Forum for Creative Europe (Czech Republic), Transmediale (Berlin), Economies of the Commons (Amsterdam) and the seminar “Sustainable Economy Law and the Internet” organised by the Telecommunications Technical Engineering Faculty at the Technical University of Madrid. As a representative of the FCForum, she is a lobbyist at the European Commission. She has provided expert advice on democratic innovation and digital rights to institutions such as the Secretary of State for Digitalisation and Artificial Intelligence of Spain and the Directorate of Digital Society of the Government of Catalonia, as well as citizens' associations.

== Political career ==
Simona Levi is one of the developers of X Party, an "anti-party" born from the 15M movement, founded on December 17, 2012, and active until 2015. She held the number 2 position on the electoral list of X Party for the 2014 European elections, behind Hervé Falciani.
