= Xnet =

Non-profit activist platform

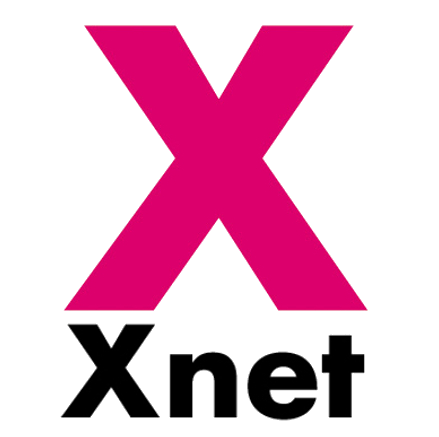
- Formation: 2008
- Type: Non-profit
- Purpose: Activism, free/libre culture, net democracy, fight against corruption
- Location: Barcelona, Spain
- Website: https://xnet-x.net/en/
- Formerly called: EXGAE

Xnet (former eXgae) is a non-profit activist platform that develops and promotes alternative models for cultural dissemination and royalty management and work in different fields related to digital rights, networked democracy and freedom of expression. Its activities revolve around five core themes: free culture, Internet neutrality, technopolitics, network democracy, new models of sustainability for the digital era and the defence of citizen journalism and the legal fight against corruption. Xnet also engages in political lobbying at the national and international levels, by preparing and submitting legislative proposals and viral campaigns. Until 2023, Xnet was a member of European Digital Rights (EDRi), a not-for-profit association to promote, protect and uphold civil rights in the field of information and communication technology.

== Initiatives ==
=== Digital rights ===
Xnet is responsible for a significant amount of activity in the defence, dissemination and expansion of digital rights in Spain and Europe and is a member of EDRI (European Digital Rights), an international group of organisations defending civil rights in the digital domain. On 9 December 2021 EDRi's board temporarily suspend Xnet from the EDRi network.

In addition to organising the FCForum, Xnet frequently publishes legislative recommendations to ensure that local, regional, Spanish and European regulations are respectful of civil rights and freedom in the digital domain, and actively promotes and participates in advocacy campaigns for or against laws, directives or public policies that have an impact in this field.

Following Snowden's revelations about mass surveillance, Xnet began work on disseminating and advocating among the general public for communication privacy and the security of information tools aimed at Internet users in order to help them guarantee their fundamental rights on their own, whatever their legislative environments.

Since 2019, together with a group of families, Xnet has designed and leads Plan for Democratic Digitalization of Education. This project includes:

- The development of a comprehensive, auditable, agile and interoperable IT tool called DD (Digital Democratic) to replace the proprietary tools in all the activity of the schools. This tool has already been implemented in 11 schools in the city of Barcelona since 2021, in collaboration with the Directorate of Democratic Innovation of the City Council and the Consortium of Education of the city.
- A program of reform of the educational system for digital training that started with the I International Congress on Democratic Digital Education and Open Edtech (2022), directed by Simona Levi, one of Xnet's founders, and recognized as teacher training by the Department of Education of the government of Catalonia.

As a consequence of this project, in 2021 and at the request of the President of the European Parliament, Levi published for the Publications Office of the European Union the report "Proposal for a sovereign and democratic digitalisation of Europe".

Simona Levi and her Xnet team have been the subject of a documentary entitled "L'escletxa" directed by David Fernandez de Castro and produced by Bettina Walter in 2021. The documentary was produced by the Catalan public television as part of the documentary program "Sense Ficció".

Since its inception, Xnet has been intensely active in the defence of Net Neutrality as a major issue affecting our Internet freedom, as well as other major issues such as the protection of whistleblowers, copyright abuses against the free circulation of information and the so-called gag laws and their impact on freedom of expression on the Internet in the Spanish state.

=== Xnet Leaks ===
Because of the leaking of the 'Blesa's Emails' (received by the X Party in 2013) that lead to the investigation and court case against Miguel Blesa (former president of the national savings bank Caja Madrid now Bankia), Xnet decided to improve create an anonymous mailbox at the disposal of those who hold relevant information about corruption. This mailbox allows citizens to send information secure and anonymously.

The organisation reports that the information received by XnetLeaks is treated first by journalists and secondly by a legal team. XnetLeaks received the first reports on the case of Caja Madrid's 'opaque Cards' through the leaks of Blesa's emails, which also uncovered the corrupt management plot concerning the high speed train AVE or the irregular financing through ghost foundations of politicians and big trade unions on Caja Madrid's management board. XnetLeaks has a blog published on five different media through which it has facilitated open access to Caja Madrid's emails, known as Blesa's Emails.

=== 15MpaRato ===
15MpaRato is a citizen platform launched by Xnet with the aim of collecting and spreading for naming those responsible for the crisis in Spain. It was created on 16 May 2012 by launching a public campaign and citizen lawsuit against Rodrigo Rato and other management positions at Bankia (the Spanish bailed-out bank).

Their main objective wasfile a lawsuit against Rodrigo Rato and Bankia's board. They presented a lawsuit that was accepted by the National Court in Spain and Rodrigo Rato and Bankia were officially accused of fraud in what the media called "The Bankia Case". The trial is currently ongoing, as of December 2015.

=== Catalonia's Working Group Against Corruption ===
This working group was created in January 2015 to coordinate the efforts of groups and individuals in an active network against corruption. Xnet coordinates and represents the working group. Also in the group: David Fernandez, president of the Parliamentary Commission on the 'Pujol Case' and member of the CUP; the 15MpaRato platform; Hervé Falciani; the collective against corruption Cafè amb Llet; the X Party's Anti-Corruption Commission and the Federation of Neighbourhood Associations of Barcelona, among others.

The group has managed to procure the approval of the appearance of the Catalan government as private prosecutor against Iñaki Urdangarín and Princess Cristina in the case of 'Palma Arena'.

On 26 November 2015, the City Council of Barcelona creates the 'Office for Transparency and Good Practices' of the City Council of Barcelona, for whose management it receives advice from the Citizen Working Group against Corruption in Catalonia.

This collaboration will consist on the City Council periodically making available the work developed by the Office to the Catalonia's Citizen Working Group against Corruption. Moreover, the Group agrees to monitor the proper functioning of the Office.

=== The Spanish state's Working Group against Corruption ===
This working group is officially presented in Barcelona on 31 October 2015, as part of the seventh edition of Free Culture Forum.

It is a state platform of citizen groups actively working against corruption, formed by Simona Levi and Sergio Salgado, from Xnet Leaks and 15MpaRato; Audita Sanidad, a collective working on a citizen debt audit of the health care sector; Ana Garrido, one of the first plaintiffs if the corruption case Gürtel; Kontuz, a citizen association of users, consumers and taxpayers that has uncovered major corruption cases in Navarra; Acción Cívica; Encarnacion Cortes, councilor who denounced corrupción in the town of Benalmádena; David Fernandez, former president of the Parliamentary Commission on the Pujol case as deputy of the CUP-Parliament; Fernando Urruticoechea, who has reported several cases of corruption from the public administration and Patricia Ramirez Suarez, activist in defense of banking abuses and founder and president of ASUFIN.

Other participants as advisors are the Citizen Debt Audit Platform – PACD; Pau A. Monserrat, economist author of "La banca culpable" (The Guilty Banks) and Raul Burillo, tax inspector who led the team of inspectors which investigated cases such as 'Palma Arena', 'Son Oms' or 'Maquillaje'.

The Citizen Group against Corruption has presented a Decalogue for Whistleblowers as a proposal towards the elaboration of specific legislation for the protection of complainants or alert triggers of corruption.

=== oXcars ===
The oXcars' are a non-competitive awards ceremony that is held at Sala Apolo in Barcelona, Spain, in October each year. They are a public showcase that puts the spotlight on cultural creation and distribution carried out under the paradigms of shared culture. Through presentations and symbolic mentions of works in a series of categories, the oXcars uses parody as a strategy for showing real legal solutions. The award categories include: Music, Animation, Theatre, Human Tools, Future Markets and Great Leftovers of Spanish Culture, among others.

=== FCForum ===
The FCForum is an international conference organised by Xnet and a network of other groups and activists. It brings together organisations and experts in the field of free/libre culture and knowledge, with the aim of creating a strategic global framework for action and international coordination. It takes place annually in Barcelona.

=== D'Evolution Summit ===
The D'Evolution Summit was created as a civil society response to the European Forum for Cultural Industries, organised by the Spanish Ministry of Culture in collaboration with the Chamber of Commerce of Barcelona, which was held in Barcelona on 29 and 30 March 2010. Authorities, experts and lobby groups participated in the Forum, which focused on five core themes: financing and the cultural industries, intellectual property and royalties management, strategies for the internationalisation of culture, culture and territorial development, and the profiles and skills for culture industry professionals.

The Forum for Cultural Industries lent continuity to the International Conference on Economy and Culture held in May 2009, and took place just before the informal meeting of the 27 Ministers of Culture of the European Union on 31 March within the framework of the Spanish Presidency of the EU.

The D’Evolution Summit was a counter-summit organised at the same time, to demand amendments to Spain's Law of Sustainable Economy (known as the anti-downloads law) and an end to the monopoly of copyright collecting societies.

During three days, the D’Evolution summit organised Internet broadcasts of the proceedings of the Forum for Cultural Industries and the Informal Meeting of Ministers, staged concerts with groups who use free licences, and carried out actions such as the handing out music with free licences to hairdressing salons and the action "We won't carry the bucket for an industry that refuses to adapt to reality" in which the comedian Leo Bassi dressed up as a clown and tried to give a giant inflatable duck to the European ministers of culture. D’Evolution also organised viral campaigns and provided information on the topics being discussed at the Forum through social networks.

=== Parents are the Pirates ===
Parents are the Pirates is a self-published collective book consisting of contributions by fifty authors who were invited to write or illustrate, in 400 words or less, one of the following topics:

- Culture in the digital era: new "profitabilities"
- The creative ecosystem of the digital age: now or never
- Digital information is what today’s memory is made of
- Copying and its benefits
- Lies, bits, the inquisition and P2P
- 13,000,000 pirate homes: piracy does not exist, parents are the pirates
- Banning communication in the communication age
- P2P: Do we really want to follow in the footsteps of Pakistan, China, France and Sudan?
- Lets talk about the middlemen: restructuring in times of crisis. Culture existed before the cultural industry
- Lost profits is counting your chickens before they hatch (and the chickens are culture)
- Public Domain vs benefits for parasites
- The right to quote: the key to the link economy

The book was launched at the first oXcars, in October 2008. It was published under a 2008 season Poetic Licence and is distributed by independent publishing house Traficantes de Sueños.

=== Legal advice ===
Xnet provides legal advice on copyright, licences, the Spanish levy on private copying, private copies, P2P, copyright collecting societies, broadcasting rights and other issues related to the digital society. They provide artists with information about the licences they can use to cover their work without becoming dependent on a collecting society. They also advise businesses that are being sued by the Spanish collecting society SGAE and want to know their rights and obligations.

== Change of name ==
On 2 August 2010, lawyers from Spain's largest copyright collecting society, the SGAE, sent a certified fax to eXgae demanding they shut down the domain name exgae.net and suspend their activities, alleging infringement of the SGAE brand and unfair competition. In the interests of avoiding a long and expensive legal battle, the collective changed its name to Xnet, although it continues working on the same issues and activities.

== See also ==
- Free software
- Private copying levy
- Net neutrality
