= Free education =

Education funded by taxation

Free education is education funded through government spending or charitable organizations rather than tuition funding. Primary school and other comprehensive or compulsory education is free in most countries (often not including primary textbook). Tertiary education is also free in certain countries, including post-graduate studies in Guyana and the Nordic countries.

The Article 13 of International Covenant on Economic, Social and Cultural Rights ensures the right to free education at primary education and progressive introduction of it at secondary and higher education as the right to education.

== Free education as a human right ==
Free education—at various levels—has been guaranteed by both domestic constitutions and in international human rights treaties.

The cost of education first became a subject of international law following World War I, although only for certain countries and only in limited situations. The "Minority Treaties" guaranteed racial, religious, and linguistic minorities in specific European countries an equal right with other nationals to establish schools at their own expense, but where such groups formed a considerable proportion of the population, they were assured of an equitable share of public educational funds, as well as instruction in their languages in public primary schools.

In 1948, the Universal Declaration of Human Rights declared that everyone has a right to education, and that education "shall be free, at least in the elementary and fundamental stages."

In the first treaty dedicated to education--the 1960 Convention against Discrimination in Education-- states undertake to "make primary education free and compulsory; make secondary education in its different forms generally available and accessible to all; [and] make higher education equally accessible to all on the basis of individual capacity."

Under the 1966 International Covenant on Economic, Social and Cultural Rights, countries recognize "the right of everyone to education," and that "primary education shall be compulsory and available free to all;" secondary education, including technical and vocational education, "shall be made generally available and accessible to all by every appropriate means, and in particular by the progressive introduction of free education;" and that "higher education shall be made equally accessible to all, on the basis of capacity, by every appropriate means, and in particular by the progressive introduction of free education." Countries undertake to "achieve progressively the full realization" of this right by all appropriate means and "to the maximum" of available resources.

The 1989 Convention on the Rights of the Child states that countries "recognize the right of the child to education" and that they "shall, in particular … (a) Make primary education compulsory and available free to all; (b) Encourage the development of different forms of secondary education, including general and vocational education, make them available and accessible to every child, and take appropriate measures such as the introduction of free education and offering financial assistance in case of need; [and] (c) Make higher education accessible to all on the basis of capacity by every appropriate means."

In June 2024, the UN's Human Rights Council approved the establishment of a working group with the mandate of "exploring the possibility of, elaborating and submitting to the Human Rights Council a draft optional protocol to the Convention on the Rights of the Child with the aim to: ... Explicitly state that, with a view to achieving the right to education, States shall: (i) Make public pre-primary education available free to all, beginning with at least one year; (ii) Make public secondary education available free to all."

== Countries ==
State universities in the Czech Republic, Finland, Germany, Iceland, Norway, Saudi Arabia and Sweden do not charge international students with tuition fees for Ph.D. degrees and in some cases for bachelor's and master's degrees as well.

State	Local language-taught bachelor's and master's degrees tuition fees (per year) for international students (Note: Excluding EEA students studying at state universities in Austria, Denmark, France, Greece, Hungary, Norway, Poland, Slovenia and Sweden, as they aren't treated as international students by those state universities and do not have to pay tuition fees.)	English-taught bachelor's and master's degrees tuition fees (per year) for international students (Note: Excluding EEA students studying at state universities in Austria, Denmark, Finland, France, Greece, Hungary, Norway, Poland, Slovenia and Sweden, as they aren't treated as international students by those state universities and do not have to pay tuition fees.)	Ph.D. degrees tuition fees for international students	Ph.D. degrees tuition fees for EEA students
Austria	ca. 1,500 EUR	ca. 1,500 EUR	ca. 1,500 EUR	Free at state universities
Czech Republic	Free at state universities	2,700 to 10,000 EUR	Free at state universities	Free at state universities
Denmark	6,000 - 16,000 EUR	6,000 - 16,000 EUR	6,000 - 16,000 EUR	Free at state universities
Finland	Free at state universities	5,000 - 20,000 EUR	Free at state universities	Free at state universities
France	2,800 - 3,800 EUR	2,800 - 3,800 EUR	2,800 - 3,800 EUR	Free at state universities
Germany	Free at state universities	Free at state universities	Free at state universities	Free at state universities
Greece	ca. 1,500 EUR	ca. 1,500 EUR	ca. 1,500 EUR	Free at state universities
Hungary	ca. 1,500 EUR	ca. 1,500 EUR	ca. 1,500 EUR	Free at state universities
Iceland	Free at state universities	Free at state universities	Free at state universities	Free at state universities
Norway	15,000 - 30,000 EUR	15,000 - 30,000 EUR	Free at state universities	Free at state universities
Poland	ca. 2,000 EUR	ca. 2,000 EUR	ca. 2,000 EUR	Free at state universities
Saudi Arabia	ca. 12,000 EUR	ca. 12,000 EUR	All fees automatically covered by scholarships, including living costs, at state universities	All fees automatically covered by scholarships, including living costs, at state universities
Slovenia	ca. 5,000 EUR	ca. 5,000 EUR	ca. 5,000 EUR	Free at state universities
Sweden	8,300 - 20,800 EUR	8,300 - 20,800 EUR	Free at state universities	Free at state universities

States funding English-taught bachelor's and master's degrees for international students Jurisdictions in which state universities do not charge international students with tuition fees for English-taught bachelor's and master's degrees

States funding Ph.D. programs for international students Jurisdictions in which state universities do not charge international students with tuition fees for Ph.D degrees

States funding Ph.D. programs for EEA students Jurisdictions in which state universities do not charge EEA students with tuition fees for Ph.D degrees

In Argentina, education is free since 1949 in every state university, not only for Argentine students, but also for international students willing to study in Argentina. Free education is financed by the Ministry of Education.

In Bangladesh, article 17 of Constitution of Bangladesh provides that all children receive free and compulsory education. Primary and secondary education is financed by the state and free of charge in public schools. The government provides free textbooks to all primary and secondary-level students. In 2022, 347,016,277 free textbooks have been distributed among 41,726,856 students across the country. The government provides free school meals to 400,000 children in 2,000 schools across 8 Divisions.

In Brazil, free education is offered by the Ministry of Education, which offers scholarships for graduate degrees, masters, doctoral and post-doctoral for Brazilians and immigrants with a Brazilian citizenship. The best universities and research centers are public institutions, financed by either the local state (state universities) or the federal government (federal universities). Graduate students can get paid if they qualify for the incentive, but competition usually are extremely fierce.

In China, steps towards free education are being taken. The Free Compulsory Education Reform can be described as a program akin to a school subsidy initiative, wherein qualifying students receive financial assistance that encompasses tuition fees and other associated expenses.

In Denmark, university education is provided for free via a monthly stipend, the "Statens Uddannelsesstøtte" or "SU", to students over 18 years of age or students who are under 18 and attending a higher education. Bachelor and master's degrees in Denmark are offered in either Danish or English depending on the programme or university.

From 2013, Estonia started providing free higher education.

In European Union countries such as France and Malta, tuition is usually free for European students, and in Germany, tuition is free for all European and international students.

In Fiji the government announced in 2013 it would cover the costs of primary and secondary school education, equivalent to 250 Fiji dollars per year per student.

In Guyana, free education is offered to all Guyanese and immigrants with Guyanese citizenship at all educational levels including nursery, primary, secondary and tertiary at the University of Guyana.

In Iran, most prestigious universities are called governmental universities which offer free education for students who pass a very competitive entrance exam with high scores. Graduates from these universities are obliged to serve the country for as many years as they studied for their degree, in order to get their diploma.

In the Republic of Ireland, the Constitution provides that the State shall provide for free primary education. Free post-primary education was introduced by a Department of Education circular dated 1 February 1967 and took effect from 1 September 1967. The European Commission's Eurydice profile for Ireland states that the introduction of free post-primary education led to a major increase in pupil participation. At higher education level, eligible first-time full-time undergraduate students may have tuition fees paid by the State under the Free Fees Initiative, but they are normally still liable for a separate student contribution charge. For the 2025/26 academic year, this charge was €2,500 per year.

In Mali, free education implementation is a relatively recent phenomenon. Prior to the turn of the century, education was often too expensive for many families, leading to a high rate of illiteracy and educational inequity. The 1990s saw the beginning of reforms with several NGOs and international bodies lobbying and offering support for free and inclusive education.

In Mauritius, the government provides free education to its citizens from pre-primary to tertiary levels. Since July 2005, the government also introduced free transport for all students.

In New Zealand, the Labour government will introduce three years of free post-school study or training. From 1 January 2018, new students will have one year free for entering study or training. From 2021, those starting tertiary education would get two years free, and from 2024 three years. The overall cost of the package is $6 billion. Labour has also pledged to increase student allowances by $50 a week, and to restore post-graduate students' eligibility for student allowances.

In Norway, at the University of Oslo, there is no tuition fee except a small semester fee of NOK(600) (US$74).

In the Philippines, public primary and secondary schools are free of tuition. The 1935 Constitution provided for universal primary education. Primary education was made free under the 1973 Constitution, while the 1987 Constitution extended free education to the secondary level. Free public tertiary education has been enacted in 2017.

In Russia, prior to the break-up of the Soviet Union, tuition was free for everyone obtaining sufficient grades. Since 1991, students obtaining sufficient grades, are still eligible for a free education (on a competitive basis) in state or private universities, but the student can also pay for studying if grades are above minimal threshold, but not enough to be enrolled into the desired university for free.

In Sri Lanka, free education is provided by the government at different levels. Government funded schools such as national schools, provincial schools and Piriven provide primary and secondary education free, while assisted schools and semi-governmental schools provide the same at subsidized rates. At the university level, the universities provide undergraduate courses free, however, this totals only about 10% for those qualified for university entrance. Grants and scholarships are provided for a limited number of study allowances. Dr. C. W. W. Kannangara who was the Minister of Education made education free for all Sri Lankan students in 1940 s. Kannangara's significant achievements in areas of education have led him to being commonly referred to as the Father of Free Education in Sri Lanka.

In Sweden, until the early 21st century, free education was provided to foreign students. Changes have been introduced to charge fees to foreign students from outside the European community.

In Tanzania, a fee free education was introduced for all the government schools in 2014. Government would pay the fees, however parents were required to pay for the school uniform and other materials.

In Trinidad and Tobago, free tertiary education is offered to citizens up to the undergraduate level at accredited public and select private institutions. Postgraduate degrees are paid up to 50% by the government at accredited institutions. This benefit is given to the citizens under a programme called Government Assisted Tuition Expenses Programme and it is managed by the Funding and Grants Administration Division of the Ministry of Tertiary Education and Skills Training

In the United Kingdom, after the Second World War, fees were generally covered by local authorities and not paid by students. This practice was mandated by the second Macmillan ministry in the Education Act 1962. Fees remained de facto free for students until the First Blair ministry, where through the Teaching and Higher Education Act 1998, tuition fees were first introduced; these were initially capped at £1,000 a year and have slowly increased since then. The Blair ministry also introduced devolution in the United Kingdom in 1999, shortly after which the Scottish Executive abolished student tuition fees at Scottish universities, financing tuition through the Student Awards Agency. University tuition is free for all Scottish nationals and is discounted for all European students, except from students coming from other parts of the United Kingdom.

In the United States, a variety of financial aid programs provide grants and student loans, mostly to low-income students, for any accredited college or university. Various proposals at the state and federal level have been made to make either community colleges or all colleges and universities free for students at all income levels. In March 2022, the U.S. state of New Mexico waived tuition for in-state students at all income levels and at all public state and tribal colleges and universities, if registered for six credit-hours and earning a minimum 2.5 GPA.

In Uruguay, free, compulsory, and secular education was adopted in 1876, after a reform led by José Pedro Varela during the Lorenzo Latorre dictatorship. The University of the Republic follows the same principles, although graduates must pay a yearly contribution.

== History ==
In the Islamic Golden Age a tradition of free madrasa-based education arose.

Free education has long been identified with "sponsored education"; for example, during the Renaissance, rich dignitaries commonly sponsored the education of young men as patrons.

Thomas Jefferson proposed "establishing free schools to teach reading, writing, and arithmetic, and from these schools those of intellectual ability, regardless of background or economic status, would receive a college education paid for by the state."

In the Soviet Union, Vladmir Lenin's government instituted a number of progressive measures which included access to universal education.

In Sri Lanka, C. W. W. Kannangara introduced universal free education from kindergarten up to undergraduate degree, becoming the first country to implement free education on national scale.

In the United States, Townsend Harris founded the first free public institution of higher education, the Free Academy of the City of New York (today the City College of New York), in 1847; it aimed to provide free education to the urban poor, immigrants and their children. Its graduates went on to receive 10 Nobel Prizes, more than any other public university. During the late 19th century, the United States government introduced compulsory education as free or universal education, which extended across the country by the 1920s. It is the oldest of CUNY's 25 institutions of higher learning [5] and is considered its flagship. Other primacies at City College that helped shape the culture of American higher education include the first student government in the nation (Academic Senate, 1867);[9] the first national fraternity to accept members without regard to religion, race, color or creed (Delta Sigma Phi, 1899);[10] the first degree-granting evening program (School of Education, 1907). City College of New York. In 1944, U.S. President Franklin Delano Roosevelt signed the Serviceman's Readjustment Act, also known as the GI Bill of Rights, into law. The GI Bill allowed World War II veterans to attend universities at no cost to them.

A report regarding free higher education was prepared by President Truman in 1947, however, no action was taken, according to what was written in the report. Therefore, it never became a reality. One possible reason could be the ongoing Cold War at that time, which made President Truman shift his focus from the report to the war-defense spending.

Governments typically fund compulsory education through taxes. Aggravated truancy can be prosecuted. Homeschooling, private or parochial schooling usually offer legal alternatives.

With the start of many free internet-based learning institutions such as edX (founded in 2012) and MITx (announced in 2011), anyone in the world with Internet access can take free education-courses. In many countries, the policy for the merit system has not yet caught up with these recent advances in education technology.

After the 2011–13 Chilean student protests, tuition-free college was a major campaign promise of Chilean president Michelle Bachelet in 2013. After some years marshaling support and funding, the gratuidad law was passed in 2018, and as of 2019 covers tuition at participating schools for families in the bottom 60% of earnings nation-wide.

== On the Internet ==
Online education has become an option in recent years, particularly with the development of free MOOCs (massive open online courses) from providers such as Khan Academy (High School) and Higher Education, through providers such as edX, Coursera, Udacity, FutureLearn and Alison. Free education has become available through several websites with some resembling the courses of study of accredited universities. Online education faces barriers such as institutional adoption, license or copyright restrictions, incompatibility and educator awareness of available resources.

Due to the extensive requirements of resources for online education, many open community projects have been initiated. Specifically, the Wikimedia Foundation has developed a project devoted to free online educational resources, Wikiversity, and recently, several other sites for specific topics have developed.

Christian Leaders Institute offers tuition free college level ministry education. Students can take any classes free of charge, but are encouraged to help support the mission of the institution by making donations to this 501 (c)3 United States Charity.

The Islamic Open University (IOU), a distance-learning higher education institution, offers tuition-free graduate and undergraduate degrees. A very modest registration fee is charged per semester, which is based on the human development index and thus varies from country to country. The IOU is offering one million scholarships for African youths by 2020.

Nidahas Vidyalaya has started an initiative named Freedom College towards providing tuition-free education in Sri Lanka.

== Other examples ==
Free education does not only take the form of publicly funded institutions like state universities.

In France, philosopher Michel Onfray created the first non-governmental free education university since antiquity, in 2002, with his Université populaire de Caen in Normandy. His decision was triggered by the accession of far-right party Front National to the second round of the 2002 French presidential elections. Onfray stated that people need more political, historical and philosophical background education to be more conscious citizens. His university is run by an association loi 1901.

In Iran, Nasra is a movement aiming to meet the learning needs of all children, youth and adults in 2018. This social movement focuses on digital media use and mental health and increase the skills of using the media for the public.

== See also ==
- Education For All
- Education Index
- Equality of opportunity
- Free content
- Free university
- Gift economy
- Global Text
- Gratis versus libre
- List of countries by spending on education as percentage of GDP
- MIT OpenCourseWare
- National Campaign Against Fees and Cuts
- OpenCourseWare
- Open education
- Open educational resources
- Open source curriculum
- Right to education
- Scholarship
- Tuition freeze
- Tuition payments
