= Wouter Tebbens =

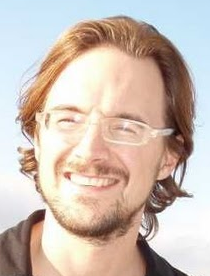
- Tebbens in Barcelona, Spain (2010 )
- Born: May 6, 1974 (age 52); Tuil, Netherlands
- Education: University of Twente
- Occupations: President of Free Knowledge Institute and director of Free Technology Academy

Wouter Tebbens (born 6 May 1974) is a Dutch activist, researcher and social entrepreneur on Free Knowledge.

== Career ==
Tebbens received a Master of Science in Mechanical Engineering at the University of Twente, Netherlands. His final research project was in the group of Production and Operations Management led by W.H.M. Zijm. In 2002 he founded the company xlocal.com, offering services based on free software to SME companies. Between 2004 and 2007 he presided the working group on Free/Libre/Open Source Software at Internet Society Netherlands.

Between 2006 and 2008 he was coordinator of the European Commission's FP6-funded SELF Project (Science, Education & Learning in Freedom) to design a platform for the collaborative construction of educational materials.

In 2007 he co-founds the non-profit foundation Free Knowledge Institute together with Hinde ten Berge and David Jacovkis to consolidate their activities and mission for a free knowledge society.

In 2008 Tebbens co-chaired the Free Knowledge Free Technology Conference, organised by the SELF Project and the Free Knowledge Institute.

The Life Long Learning Programme of the European Commission awards the Free Knowledge Institute a grant to set up the Free Technology Academy together with the Open Universiteit Nederland and the Open University of Catalonia. Tebbens will lead the project and becomes the first director of the academy.

In 2009 Tebbens was one of the co-organisers of the Free Culture Forum in Barcelona, where he organised and moderated the Educational panel. The main working documents that were produced during the Forum led to the Charter for Innovation, Creativity and Access to Knowledge. Kim Tucker and Tebbens have written a modified version for the Charter from a Free Knowledge perspective, drawing on the various working documents produced during the Forum. The Free Knowledge Institute has published a summary of that as Ten Points For Change.

In 2011 he was programme committee member for the Open Knowledge Conference in Berlin, organised by the Open Knowledge Foundation.

== Publications ==
- 2006, Kennisdelen in de eenentwintigste eeuw, book chapter in Open Source Jaarboek 2006–2007, MediaUpdate, Gorredijk (The Netherlands).
- 2006, 14 June, Los peligros del copyright, published in Spanish newspaper La Vanguardia. Retrieved September 8, 2010.
- 2006, Sharing Knowledge in the 21st Century, conference paper for the Online Observatory for Cybersociety Congress. Retrieved September 8, 2010.
- 2007, 23 March, Waarom gunnen we Microsoft zo'n monopoliepositie?, published in Dutch newspaper Trouw. Retrieved September 8, 2010.
- 2006, Extremadura, van achterblijver naar voorloper (PDF), book chapter in Open Source Jaarboek 2007–2008, MediaUpdate, Gorredijk (The Netherlands), by David Jacovkis and Wouter Tebbens. Retrieved September 8, 2010.
- 2009, Free technology academy: a European initiative for distance education about free software and open standards, Proceedings of the 14th annual ACM SIGCSE conference on Innovation and technology in computer science education, Paris by David Megias, Wouter Tebbens, Lex Bijlsma and Francesc Santanach.
- 2010, Free Technology Academy: Towards sustainable production of free educational materials, conference paper for the Free Culture Research Conference, Berlin, by Wouter Tebbens, David Megias, David Jacovkis and Lex Bijlsma.
- 2010, The Knowledge Society from a freedom centred perspective, conference paper for the Free Culture Research Conference, Berlin, by Wouter Tebbens, Hinde ten Berge and David Jacovkis. Retrieved October 8, 2010.
- 2010, "Free Technology Academy : a Joint Venture of Free Software and OER", conference paper in Open ED Conference Proceedings 2010, Barcelona, by Wouter Tebbens, David Megías, David Jacovkis and Lex Bijlsma. Retrieved March 11, 2011.
