= X Party =

X Party Partido X
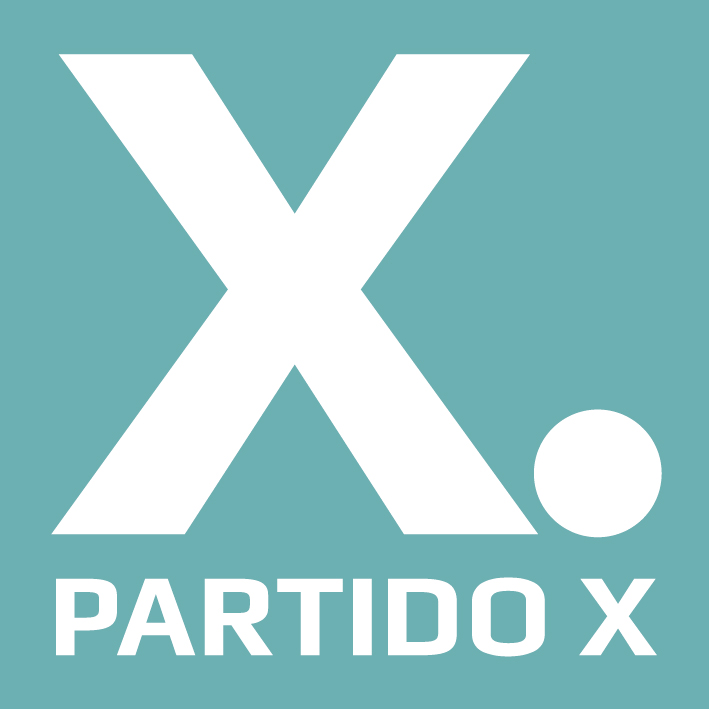
- Leader: Simona Levi
- Founded: 2012
- Ideology: E-democracy; Direct democracy

Website
- partidox.org

The X Party (Spanish: Partido X) is a political party officially registered with the Spanish Ministry of Interior. The X Party registered towards the end of 2012, and appeared publicly at the beginning of 2013. It was the first party to be founded by a group of people connected to the 15M movement and other free-culture movements. The party supports a model of democracy that is participatory and monitored by everyday citizens, taking advantage of the political potential of tools available for digital communication.

Party X has been labeled by numerous researchers and specialized journalists as an "anti-party". Its own members have publicly stated that it is an experimental project aimed at seeking innovative solutions, validating hypotheses and opening the electoral space to new forms of political participation.

In the 2014 European elections, Party X obtained 100,115 votes despite having obtained hardly any media coverage during the election campaign. In response to this experience, the party published a report where it evaluated its participation to the elections. Party X ceased to be active in the electoral arena in 2015 announcing itself as dormant, with no plans to run for election again for an indefinite period.

== Program ==
Its program is based on four pillars: transparency in public management; governmental and legislative power for the people (Wikidemocracy); the right to a real and permanent vote; the application of a binding referendum process.

Other characteristics of the X Party are: open electoral lists, the use of crowdfunding for financing, collaborative creation of the agenda, online publication of party's financial activity, a lack of affiliated members and fees, the recognition of free software and creative commons licenses, organization in nodes and networks, the federation of competencies, sequential participation, the use of activist vocabulary and its technopolitical style.

== History ==
=== Background ===
The majority of the founding members of the X Party actively participated in the 15M movement as it became known. In May 2012, the 15MpaRato platform was created, a collective which would later become part of the X Party's Anticorruption Commission. This platform is part of the popular accusation involved in the judicial processes known as the Bankia case [link], The Bankia Preferential Shares case and the Blesa case. Some of the founding members of these collectives came together to form the X Party at the end of 2012 and beginning of 2013.

=== Founding ===
Partido X, Partido del futuro (X Party, Party of the Future) was registered in the Registry of Political Parties on 17 December 2012 and in November 2014, the name was modified to, and is currently registered as, the Red Ciudadana Partido X: Democracia y Punto (X Party Citizens' Network: Just Democracy). The members of the party were presented at a public press conference on October 8, 2013.

== 2014 European Parliamentary elections ==
The X Party ran for the May 2014 European parliamentary elections. The list was led by Hervé Falciani. Other candidates on the list included Simona Levi, Raúl Burillo, and Juan Moreno Yagüe. They obtained 100,561 votes, 0.64% of the total, which was insufficient to win parliamentary representation.

== Ideology ==
The X Party is a transversal initiative that cannot be defined ideologically merely on the left-right axis. Rather, it is a method. The party's website states that their goal is to use the party as a means to help move towards a more direct and participative form of democracy, one based on pragmatism and compromise, also known as a "pact of minimums". Their working method is based on open source principles, free culture and free information.

== Program ==
The X Party's program adapts to the competencies of the offices in the election in question. Up to this point, it has been adapted for the 2014 European parliamentary elections.

The main axis of their proposal, Just Democracy, is based on 4 mechanisms to establish a true democracy where citizens have control over executive decisions and legislation. These mechanisms are:

- Transparency in public administration
- Government with citizen oversight (Wikigovernment: citizen participation in the handling of public matters) and citizen legislative power (Wikilegislation: elaboration of participatory and transparent legislation).
- The right to a real and permanent vote (for all citizens to have the right to vote, if they wish, on all of the laws that are debated in parliament).
- Binding and mandatory referendums

The X Party has developed two emergency plans that provide solutions to specific problems. These plans, known as the Emergency plan for overcoming the economic crisis and the Specific Emergencies Plan, include proposals for different sectors such as healthcare, education, science and R&D, housing, energy and the information society. Both plans were based on contributions from organized Civil Society groups such as the Plataforma de Afectados por la Hipoteca (Platform for People Affected by Mortgages), the Asociación de Facultativos Especialistas de Madrid (Madrid Association of Medical Specialists), and more.

== Organization ==
The X Party establishes an organizational structure inspired by the 90-9-1 principle: a structure with five levels based on degree of involvement. Inspired by the nomenclature of free software, the levels are:

- Developers
- Hub (Kernel)
- Matrix
- Support
- AgendaX

This structure is kept open and flexible so that members can change their role according to different principals such as the level of involvement, proven ability, peer recognition, respect and the demands of common goals.

=== Commissions ===
The X Party has created different commissions focused on specific themes in which groups of independent experts advise the party. These commissions are: Science and R&D, Education, Energy, Healthcare, Information Society, Housing and the Anticorruption Commission and Citizen Control of Financial Flow Commission. Members of these commissions include Manuel Castells, Hervé Falciani and Raúl Burillo, as well as collectives such as 15MpaRato, the Spanish Society of Scientists in the UK (Spanish: Sociedad de Científicos Españoles en el Reino Unido) or CERU, the Spanish Society of Scientists in the Federal Republic of Germany (Spanish: Sociedad de Científicos Españoles en la República Federal de Alemania) or CERFA, the law firm Bufet Almeida and Xnet.

=== Anticorruption Commission ===
This commission is composed of a group of citizens, activists, professionals and experts who work with, in collaboration or as integrated members, the X Party to create secure channels through which they can promote citizen observation. Using these methods, the Anticorruption Commission was able to leak Blesa's E-mails to the press, e-mails from the banker Miguel Blesa which were included in the Bankia case lawsuit. The 'Black' Credit Cards scandal was uncovered as a result of these leaks and led the investigating judge to open a second suit which deals specifically with the scandal.

== Financing ==
The X Party is financed by donations and crowdfunding.

== Selection process for the electoral lists ==
The X Party chose its candidates for the 2014 European parliamentary elections through an open and participative procedure that allowed citizens to propose candidates from outside of the party structure who were partnered with people from the organization to form the electoral list. In the elections, the party received 0.64% of the votes and gained no seat.

== See also ==
- Direct digital democracy / electronic digital democracy
- Direct democracy
- Free software
- Transparency
- Electronic voting
- Xnet
