= Free Culture Forum =

International meeting on the freedom of culture

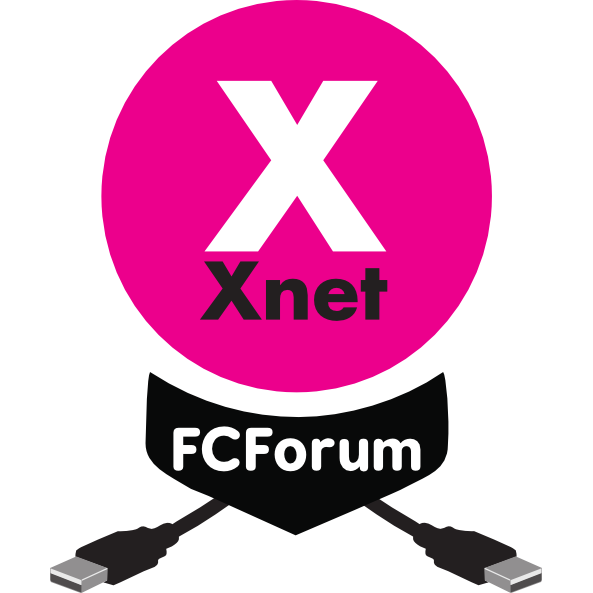
- FCForum logo
- Location: Barcelona, Spain
- Organised by: Xnet
- Website: http://fcforum.net

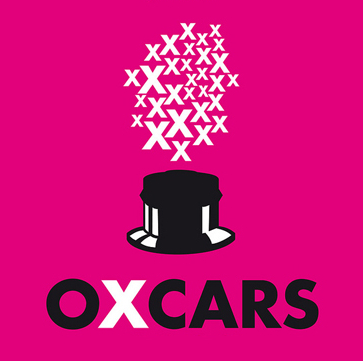
The Oxcars

The Free Culture Forum (FCForum) was an international meeting of relevant organisations and individuals involved in free culture, digital rights and access to knowledge. It took place in Barcelona every year from 2009 to 2015, jointly with the oXcars, a free culture festival. The oXcars (or OXcars) are a non-competitive awards ceremony held at Sala Apolo in Barcelona, Spain, in October each year. They are a public showcase that puts the spotlight on cultural creation and distribution carried out under the paradigms of shared culture. Through presentations and symbolic mentions of works in a series of categories, real legal situations involving free culture are shown using parody.

== Award ceremonies ==
The Oxcars are an awards ceremony organised by Xnet (previously eXgae, until November 2010), a non-profit organisation that explores alternative models for cultural diffusion and royalties management. In 2008 and 2009 the oXcars were organised with the collaboration of Conservas, and in 2010 with Conservas, Red Sostenible and Telenoika.

The awards ceremony is an overview of outstanding projects in the field of free/libre culture and knowledge, with live music, videos, brief presentations, performances and readings. Since 2009, the ceremonies have coincided with the FCForum, an international conference in which organisations and experts in free/libre culture and knowledge gather to devise a global strategic framework and an international framework for coordination.

== Categories ==
The award categories include:

- Music
- Film
- Dance
- Theatre
- Animation
- Literature
- Millions of Visits in Your Bedroom
- Great Human Tools
- Future Markets
- Culture existed before the Cultural Industry
- Great Leftovers of Spanish Culture

== History ==
=== 2008 Oxcars ===
The participants of the first Oxcars, on October 28, 2008, were Leo Bassi, The Pirate Bay, literary collective Wu Ming, filmmaker Guillermo Zapata (director of the short film Lo que tú quieras oír), Pablo Soto (developer of the Manolito P2P software), Platoniq, Alan Toner, FreeCinema, Griffi from Sólo los Solo, Molleindustria (with the video game Free Culture Game), Enrique Sierra from 127.es, the Blender Foundation with the 3D short film Big Buck Bunny, Realidades Avanzadas and Matt Black (Coldcut). The evening was rounded off with live sets by K-Sero+Off://TV, Filastine and La Màquina de Turing.

==== Related activities ====
A series of activities related to free/libre culture were organised on October 29 and November 1, in conjunction with the 2008 oXcars. They included talks, debates, round table discussions and practical workshops on licences, examples of free culture, anonymity and cryptography on the net, production and royalties management for audiovisual projects, and Safe Creative, a service that allows users to register works with any type of licence at no cost. Activities also included the launch of the book New Thing by Wu Ming and a screening of the film Steal this film, part 2.

=== FCForum 2009 ===
The main objectives of the Free Culture Forum 2009 (from October 30 to November 1) were, on the one hand, building networks to optimise the efforts of the different groups and setting common demands against the proposals from industry and governments in their eagerness to control culture and information; and on the other hand reinforcing the self-organisation of tools and infrastructures to support free culture. The Free Knowledge Institute. The FCForum 2009 produced the Charter for Innovation, Creativity and Access to Knowledge.

Official observers from the European Community's Commission for Culture and Education, the European Community's Commission for Consumer Protection Government of Brazil ( were present.

==== Charter for innovation, creativity and access to knowledge ====
The Charter for innovation, creativity and access to knowledge contains suggested legal requirements, guidelines for education and access to knowledge, and structural requirements for a knowledge-based society. The guidelines were discussed by more than a hundred representatives at the forum. The Charter was used as an international reference during consultation with the Department of Digital Culture (Government of Brazil). It was used to negotiate sustainable laws with the Spanish Government, and the proposals were presented to the European Council during the Spanish Presidency of the European Union in 2010. Among the Charter's endorsers there are Jimmy Wales, Boaventura de Sousa Santos, Consumers International, Electronic Frontier Foundation, David Bollier, Students for Free Culture, European Digital Rights, Participatory Culture Foundation, La Quadrature du Net, Transnational Institute, Department of Digital Culture (Government of Brazil), Pirat Partie, Creative Commons España, La-EX, and Networked Politics.

The Charter has been disseminated and implemented worldwide, including the 26th Chaos Communication Congress in Berlin and the Free Culture X Conference]

=== 2009 Oxcars ===
The participants of the 2nd Oxcars were Duquende, the playwright Rodrigo García, the creators of the Internet series Malviviendo, Derivart, the Taller de Musics Original Jazz Orquesta, the writer Alberto Vázquez-Figueroa, Electronic Frontier Foundation, Riot Cinema Collective, Jamendo, Illegal Art, FreeCinema, the publishers Alqua, the artist Evan Roth, the comedian Rémi Gaillard, psst!3 (collaborative film project), Shelios, short film maker David O'Reilly, Compartir Dòna Gustet, Xavier Theros and Martín Fernández (MotionGraphics). The evening ended with a concert and live DJ set by Daedelus and Martin Vallejo.

=== FCForum 2010 ===
The second FCForum was held in Barcelona from October 28 to 31, 2010 and focused on economical models. It resulted in a Declaration and How to Manual on sustainability of creativity in the digital era The FCForum declaration was signed by 80 organisations and individuals, including Richard Stallman.

==== Sustainable models for creativity in the digital age ====
In February 2011, two documents drafted by FCForum participants were released: Sustainable Models for Creativity and the How-To Manual for Sustainable creativity addressed at political reformers, citizens and free culture activists. Both documents are based on an understanding that current royalties management and cultural distribution systems have become obsolete in the digital age, and the conviction that free software and peer production and distribution is not incompatible with commercial distribution. The How-To Manual sets out a series of alternative commercial and non-profit models. It insists that the Internet must remain free and open in order to allow online collaboration models to develop, and it must be recognised as a tool that promotes contact between creators and the public. It offers an overview of new models that are already operating in a variety of fields, such as freemium, crowdfunding and micropayment systems in which users make small financial contributions to projects that are looking for seed funding through platforms such as Kickstarter and lanzanos.com or to existing initiatives that are given money depending on the number of users who vote for them. It also claims that the creators of commercial cooperative platforms should share their profits with the creators of the content they publish.

=== 2010 Oxcars ===
The participants of the 3rd Oxcars in 2010 were the writer José Luis Sampedro, The Pinker Tones, Kate Madison and Actors at Work Productions (creators of the film Born of Hope), dance company Akram Khan, the writer Belén Gopegui, Miguel Brieva, Triolocría, design studio Lava with their Free Magenta campaign (against the Deutsche Telekom patent on the colour magenta), gastronomic blogger Txaber Allué, hip-hop crew At Versaris, the Reactable (collaborative electronic music instrument), the free culture and copyleft festival Te Pica la Barba (with the animated short film Sopa, by Irene Iborra and Jossie Malis), Rojadirecta (a portal that offers sports broadcast through streaming or P2P applications), Koulomek, the Tweetpeli (a collaborative film made through Twitter), leerestademoda.com, Ploomba (a free piped music service), Jerzy Celichowski (from Blinken Open Society Archives), European Digital Rights, Public Domain Day, La Máquina que guía los rayos del sol (animations), Martín Hernández (MotionGraphics) and Kevin Nicoll (illustration).

=== FCForum 2011 ===
The third annual FCForum was held in Barcelona on October 28, 29 and 30, under the title ‘Networks for a R-evolution’.

It included a round table on the current situation of film and the Internet in Spain, with Álex de la Iglesia, Juan Carlos Tous, Amparo Peiró, Eudald Doménech and the lawyer Josep Jover. This was followed by a session in which Yproducciones, Kayros Transmedia, Daniel Granados, Kolector, Flattr, Goteo and Verkami explored some new sustainable alternatives for the creative sector.

Day two focused on challenges and tools for the defence of the Internet and of sharing in the framework of the digital revolution. Participants included the lawyer David Bravo, La Quadrature du Net, John Perry Barlow and Richard Stallman.

=== 2011 Oxcars ===
The participants featured in the 4th Oxcars included John Perry Barlow (co-founder of the Electronic Frontier Foundation), who celebrated 15 years of the Declaration of the Independence of Cyberspace; digital newspaper El Mundo Today, which gives a satirical account of political and social current affairs; Stéphane Grueso, director of Copiad Malditos, the first Creative Commons documentary co-produced by TVE; cartoonist Aleix Saló; and the group Las buenas noches, which releases its music under Creative Commons.

=== FCForum 2012 ===
The fourth FCForum was held at Ars Santa Mònica on October 26 and 27.

It explored the theme of sustainable models for the creative sector, with practical examples from the fields of journalism, education (Freeangle) and publishing (Bookcamping). The report on crowdfunding "Crowdfunding Experiences in Spain and Catalonia: Key Characteristics, Challenges and Obstacles. Inspiration and Recommendations for a Stronger Tool for Collective, Public and Private Cross-Financing” was presented. One of the main sections looked at how cyber crime is being used as an excuse to criminalize and control the Internet.

It also covered democracy in the digital age, with debates on transparency in public institutions (Cuentas Claras, Discursia, Sueldos Públicos, Graba to Pleno, Qué hacen los diputados, Open Knowledge Foundation, Access Info, Tu Derecho a Saber and Civio), journalism and freedom of information, and networked democracy.

The 2012 FCForum also worked on a system for the collaborative reform of Intellectual Property legislation in Spain and the European Union, using documents linked to the FCForum and the proposal prepared by Quadrature du Net as a point of departure. It also participated in the book Cultura libre digital - Nociones básicas para defender lo que es de todxs, which was published by Editorial Icaria in 2012.

=== 2012 Oxcars ===
The 5th Oxcars were held in Barcelona on 25 October 2012, and focused on identifying the defenders and detractors of the free circulation of culture and the new models of cultural creation. The show began with an adaptation of a speech by Cory Doctorow, "The Coming War on General Purpose Computation". Participants included the actor Paco León, with his film Carmina o revienta, premiered simultaneously in theatres and on the Internet; the rapper Dan Bull; the documentary No.Res, released under Creative Commons; the citizen legal action 15M pa Rato; the web portal Taringa! and the initiative Megabox by Megaupload.

=== FCForum 2013 ===
The FCForum 2013 took place on October 25 and revolved around four core themes: Creativity, Culture and Knowledge: New models of access and production; Data Science: The potential and limits of Big Data; Networked Democracy; and Electronic Money and Distributed Currency: Strengths and weaknesses.

=== 2013 Oxcars ===
The sixth Oxcars were held in Barcelona on 24 October 2013. Participants included the lawyer David Bravo, a specialist in intellectual property and computer law, Toque a Bankia, My Open Source Cure, Paul Borons, Robocicla, Scann, and the electronic music group Kashba.

=== FCForum 2014 ===
The sixth edition of the FCForum was itinerant; it took place in different spaces and dates.

The Barcelona Growth Center hosted on November 4 an all-day meeting on Networked Democracy and Technopolitics where eight participants with experience in these fields explained both dimensions and the practices in technopolitics and democracy. On November 5, 6 and 7, at the BAU Design College of Barcelona, several workshops on design tools took place as well as lectures divided in five blocks:

- Free design practices
- Prosthetics and pots
- Open hardware and design
- Critical perspectives in art and design
- Design of open spaces

The participants in this edition were designers, artists, associations and cultural collectives.

On November 27, 28 and 29, at the Barcelona's Center of Contemporary Culture, The Influencers took place; a festival about non conventional art, communication guerrilla and radical entertainment.

=== FCForum 2015 ===
Under the title Fighters & Makers, the seventh edition of the FCForum took place on October 30 and 31 and November 2, 2015, in different spaces in Barcelona.

On October 30, Sala Conservas held a series of working groups on - Legislation on copyright and intellectual property. Net Neutrality.- Freedom of expression, and freedom of information

On October 31, the FCForum moved to the Farinera del Clot cultural centre, opening with a press conference for journalists and attendees to introduce the "Citizen Group against Corruption";

== See also ==
- Open source licenses
- Free software
- Private copying levy
- Net neutrality
- Public domain
- P2P
- Xnet
