= Bankia =

Spanish financial services company (2010–2021)

Bankia S.A.

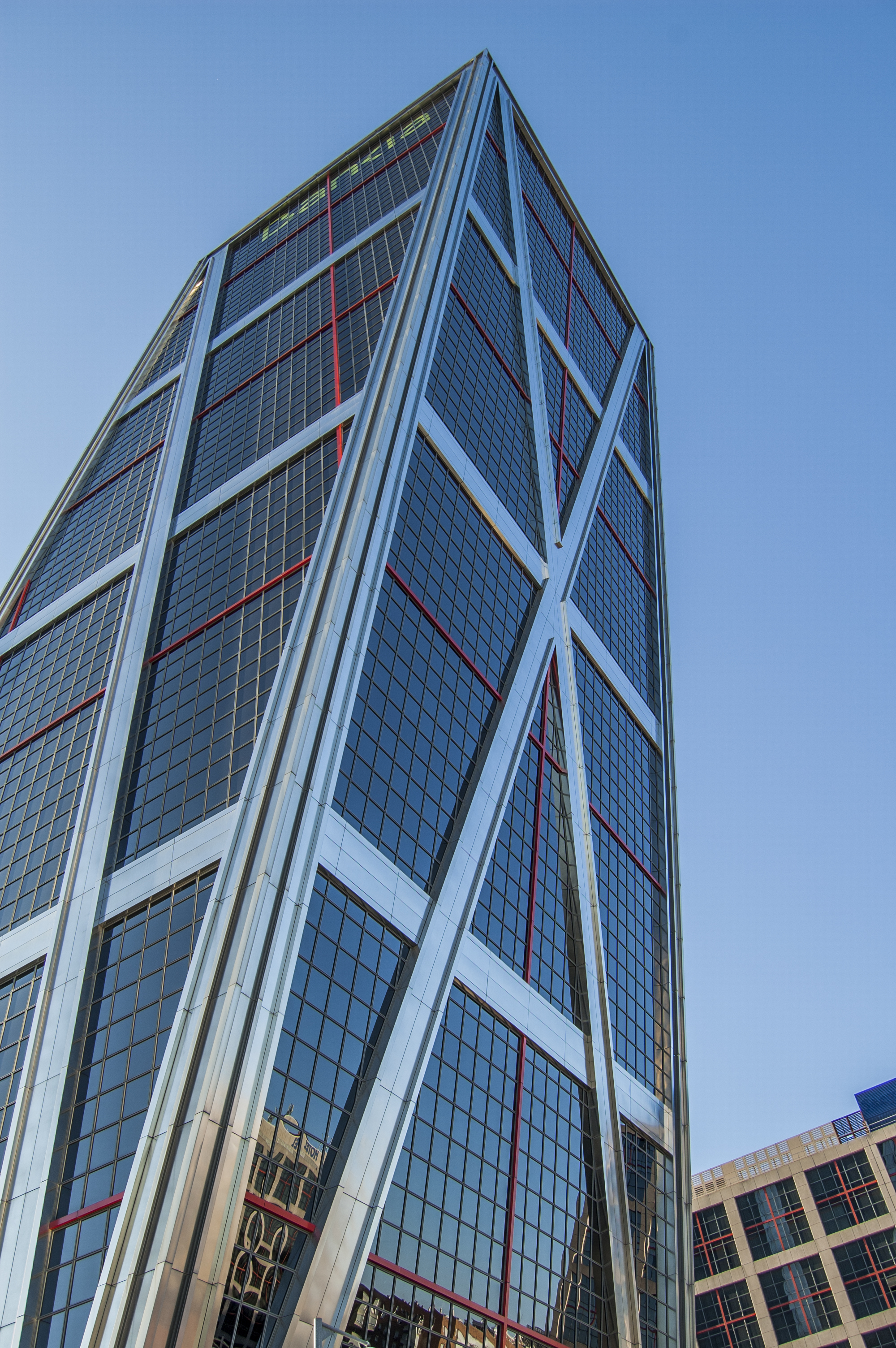
- Headquarters at Gate of Europe I, Madrid
- Type: Sociedad Anónima
- Traded as: BMAD: BKIA
- ISIN: ES0113307039
- Industry: Financial services
- Founded: 3 December 2010
- Defunct: 26 March 2021
- Fate: Merged with CaixaBank
- Successor: CaixaBank
- Headquarters: Madrid and Valencia, Spain
- Area served: Spain
- Key people: José Ignacio Goirigolzarri (Executive Chairman); José Sevilla (CEO)
- Products: Retail banking, corporate banking, investment banking, private banking, asset management, finance and insurance
- Revenue: ▼€3.027 billion (2017)
- Operating income: ▼€1.185 billion (2017)
- Net income: ▲€816 million (2017)
- Total assets: ▼€179.098 billion (2017)
- Total equity: ▲€12.709 billion (2017)
- Owner: Spanish Government (61%)
- Number of employees: ▼13,463 (2017)
- Parent: BFA Tenedora de Acciones
- Website: www.bankia.com

Bankia (Spanish pronunciation: [ˈbaŋkja]) was a Spanish financial services company that was formed in December 2010, consolidating the operations of seven regional savings banks, and was partially nationalized by the government of Spain in May 2012 due to the near-collapse of the institution. As of 2017, Bankia was the fourth largest bank in Spain, with total assets of €179.1 billion. In 2021, the bank merged with CaixaBank to create a new entity, initially preserving its original name.

== History ==
=== Formation and IPO ===
Bankia was formed on 3 December 2010, as a result of the union of seven Spanish savings banks that had a major presence in their historical core regions. The merger of the seven banks, known as 'cold fusion', took only four months, with the integration contract being signed on 30 July 2010. Caja Madrid, which was itself owned by the government of the Community of Madrid, held controlling interest. The distribution of shares was as follows:

- 52.06% Caja Madrid
- 37.70% Bancaja
- 2.45% La Caja de Canarias
- 2.33% Caja de Ávila
- 2.11% Caixa Laietana
- 2.01% Caja Segovia
- 1.34% Caja Rioja

After the merger, Bankia was initially owned by the holding company Banco Financiero y de Ahorros (BFA), and the seven banks controlled BFA. The most toxic assets from the banks were transferred to BFA, which obtained €4.5 billion from the Spanish government rescue fund FROB in exchange for preference shares with an annual interest rate of 7.75%, maturing in 2015. In 2011, Bankia offered shares to the public in an IPO. Investment bankers found little interest in the IPO among international institutional investors. The strategy shifted to selling the stock domestically and largely to customers of the bank itself, with 98% of the initial €3.1 billion raised by domestic sales of shares. The shares of Bankia began trading on the Bolsa de Madrid on 20 July 2011, under the symbol BKIA, and the bank was listed in the IBEX 35.

=== Insolvency and state bailout ===
In 2012, Bankia was the third-largest lender in Spain but the largest holder of real estate assets at €38 billion. On 7 May 2012, Rodrigo Rato stepped down as chairman of Bankia SA, in order to clear the way for a rescue plan that the Spanish government hoped would persuade international investors of the country's financial stability. José Ignacio Goirigolzarri became the new president. Concerns about the value of Bankia's assets, and the potential for further losses in the future, prompted speculation that the Spanish government would inject up to €10 billion of new capital into the troubled bank.

On 10 May, the Spanish government said it would convert its preference shares in BFA into voting shares, giving it a controlling stake of 45% in Bankia. On 25 May, trading in the shares was suspended at Bankia's request.

On 25 May, it was reported that Bankia SA had negotiated a further state guarantee, marking another rise in the cost of a drawn-out rescue. Bankia also revised its earnings statement for 2011, stating that instead of a profit of €309 million, it had in fact lost €4.3 billion before taxes, and asked for 1.4 billion fiscal credit to reduce its loss. The New York Times described the increasing bailout as making Spain one of the new focal points of the European sovereign-debt crisis. In response to growing concerns, Standard & Poor's downgraded its rating of Bankia's creditworthiness to BB+, making it a junk bond.

In the end, the rescue plans approved by the European Commission on 27 June 2012 under state aid rules included an equity injection for €4465 million and a liquidity guarantee of €19 billion to BFA, 12 of which would be provided to Bankia.

=== Restructuring (2012–2017) ===
A number of limitations were imposed as a result of having received state aid. Shareholders had to share part of the burden of the capital injection, the balance sheet had to be reduced, dividends were restricted until 2014, and both the branch network (-39%) and workforce (-28%) had to be reduced.

In addition to the financial problems, the new management had to deal with controversies related to former management.

In 2013, Bankia returned to profitability. In 2013, Bankia Bolsa was acquired by the Catalan entity GVC (founded by the president of the Barcelona Stock Exchange, Joan Hortalà). Bankia, which received 37 million euros from the sale, did not report the capital gains. Subsequently, the entity changed its name to Beka Finance.

On 28 February 2014, Spain sold a 7.5% stake in Bankia for €1.3 billion. The shares were sold at €1.51 each. Further divestment was expected for 2014 under the rescue programme, but did not happen.

On 7 July 2015, Bankia paid the first dividend in its history €0,0176 per share. On 16 October, Bankia completed the sale of City National Bank of Florida for $883 million to Chilean bank BCI. The bank was bought by Caja Madrid for $1.12 billion in 2008. At the end of 2015, Bankia had fulfilled two years ahead of schedule all the targets set by the European Commission in the BFA-Bankia Group Restructuring Plan. The bank also reported the best efficiency, solvency, and profitability among the six largest Spanish banks.

On 23 February 2016, Fitch raised Bankia's rating to "BBB−", restoring the bank's rating to investment grade. On 8 September, Bankia announced that it was included in the Dow Jones Sustainability Index with a score of 84 out of 100.

On 27 June 2017, Bankia agreed to acquire state-owned bank BMN (Banco Mare Nostrum) for €825 million in an all-stock deal. BMN was the result of the merger of the savings banks Caja Murcia, Caja Granada and Sa Nostra. On 3 November, Bankia announced that it was listed in the CDP Climate Change report for 2017 as one of a group of 112 global companies leading the fight against climate change. The restructuring period will end on 31 December 2017. The deadline for the privatisation of Bankia was end-2019; however, in December 2018 the Government decided to postpone the privatization until end-2021.

=== Since 2017 ===
On 27 February 2018, Bankia announced that it planned to pay €2.5 billion to shareholders over the next three years as part of its 2018-2020 strategic plan. It aimed for a profit of €1.3 billion in 2020.

On 4 September 2020, it was confirmed that CaixaBank and Bankia were negotiating a potential merger. The merger would create the biggest domestic bank in Spain with assets of €650 billion. The merger was effective 26 March 2021.

== Controversies ==
=== IPO misleading ===
On 27 January 2016, the Spanish Supreme Court ordered Bankia to reimburse two small investors for misleading them during its 2011 IPO. The court said that the prospectus for its public stock offering had contained "serious inaccuracies". The bank is aware of lawsuit claims totalling €819 million and has set aside €1.84 billion in provisions for claims. On 17 February 2016, the bank announced it would fully compensate minority shareholders who participated in the IPO in exchange for returning their shares to the bank. They will receive 100% of their investment plus 1% compensatory interest per annum. The offer saved Bankia €400 million in legal costs.

=== Preference shares ===
Bankia sold around €5 billion in complex financial products such as preference shares and subordinated debt to customers. Most of these products suffered enforced writedowns. The bank began an arbitration process in 2013. On 15 July 2016, the time limit for submissions of applications for arbitration expired.

=== Credit card misuse ===
On 23 February 2017, 65 individuals received sentences for misusing the company's credit cards. Rodrigo Rato (former president of Bankia, and also a former managing director of the IMF) was sentenced to four and a half years in jail, and Miguel Blesa (former chairman of Caja Madrid) was sentenced to six years in jail. The other defendants received sentences ranging from three months to six years. Documents indicate that the personal spending by executives and directors totaled €12.5 million. The fraud was discovered by the publication of an article on eldiario.es based on the emails of Miguel Blesa. Initially, the article did not lead to any judicial investigation. Instead, Madrid's chief prosecutor tried to initiate legal actions against the media that spread the emails of Blesa, because they were "illicitly obtained". The news led Bankia to order an internal investigation, and the bank later transferred the information to the FROB.

=== Customer care ===
In January 2022, Carlos San Juan de Laorden, a retired urologist from Valencia with Parkinson's disease started an online petition for more human customer care at bank branches. At a malfunctioning ATM a sign informed customers that they could only be seen with appointments, but no appointments could be made by phone. He gathered more than 600,000 signatures in 2 months, asking banks and other institutions to serve all citizens, and not discriminate the oldest and most vulnerable members. In Spain, the number of bank branches had shrunk to about 20,000 in 10 years since the bailout of 2012, and with the coronavirus pandemic another 3,000 branches closed in less than 2 years with the push for online banking.

== Organisation ==
The bank has its registered office and address of the subsidiaries in Valencia, while its operational headquarters are in Madrid. It also has a representation office in Shanghai. The bank is organised into six business areas: Retail Banking, Business Banking, Private Banking, Asset Management and Bancassurance, Capital Markets and Investees.

Bankia was listed on the Bolsa de Madrid and was a constituent of the IBEX 35.

== See also ==
- List of banks in Spain
