= 2016–2017 Podemos state party assembly =

← 2014	7 December 2016−12 February 2017	2020 →
- Turnout: 155,190
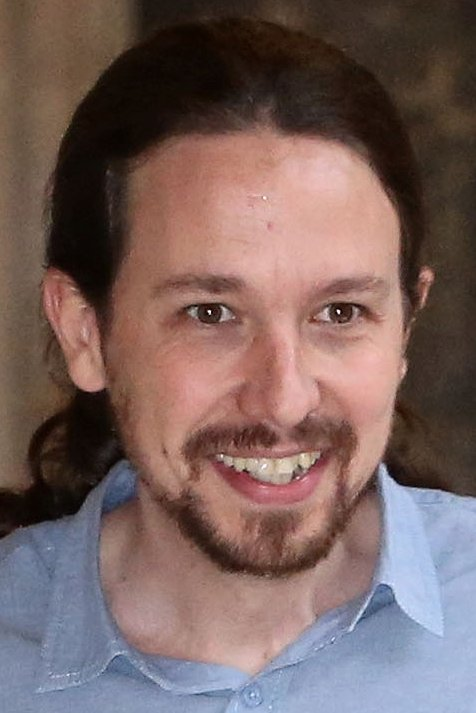

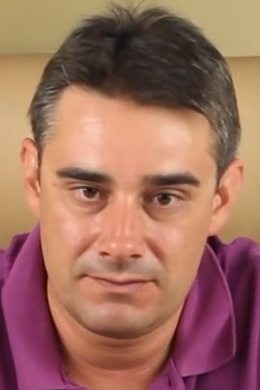
Candidate	Pablo Iglesias	Juan Moreno Yagüe
Party	Podemos	Podemos
Popular vote	128,742	15,772
Percentage	89.1%	10.9%
Previous Secretary General
Pablo Iglesias
Secretary General
Pablo Iglesias

The 2016−2017 Podemos state assembly—officially the 2nd Citizen Assembly, and more informally referred to as Vistalegre II—was held between 7 December 2016 and 12 February 2017. Party members would be able to vote on the party's strategic proposals as well as the new leadership composition from February 4 to February 11. While Pablo Iglesias's re-election bid as Secretary General was not disputed, there was strong media interest in the assembly because of a strong internal debate between Iglesias and his Political Secretary, Íñigo Errejón, on the party's strategy and main lines of action for the ensuing years.

== Timetable ==
Date	Event
Decision on the State Citizen Council voting system (7–20 December)
7–13 December	Submission of provisional proposals.
13–15 December	Submission of final proposals.
15 December	Deadline for drafting and transaction of proposals.
16 December	Publication of proposals.
16–20 December	Electoral campaign.
18–20 December	Voting period.
Citizen Assembly (5 January–12 February)
5 January	Deadline for members to join Podemos to vote in the Assembly.
5–22 January	Preparation of political, organisational, ethical and equality documents.
23 January	Submission of provisional documents.
23 January–1 February	Mergers of the different documents or partial transactions of their contents.
2 February	Submission of candidacies and definitive documents.
2–11 February	Electoral campaign.
4–11 February	Voting period.
11–12 February	2nd Citizen Assembly in Palacio Vistalegre, Madrid.

== Results ==
=== Secretary General ===
Summary of the 4–11 February Podemos primary election results
Candidate	Votes	%
Pablo Iglesias	128,742	89.09
Juan Moreno Yagüe	15,772	10.91
Total	144,514	100.00
Valid votes	144,514	93.12
Invalid and blank ballots	10,676	6.88
Total votes	155,190	100.00
Source: Podemos

=== State Citizen Council ===
Choice	Points	%	Won	%
Podemos Para Todas (Team Pablo Iglesias)	138,663,530	50.78	37	59.68
Recuperar la Ilusión (Team Íñigo Errejón)	91,954,949	33.67	23	37.10
Podemos en Movimiento (Team Miguel Urbán/Teresa Rodríguez)	35,811,970	13.11	2	3.23
Others	6,635,502	2.43	0	0.00
Total votes	273,065,951	100.00	62	100.00
Source: eldiario.es

=== Documents ===
Political Document
Choice	Votes	%
Podemos Para Todas (Team Pablo Iglesias)	85,946	56.04
Recuperar la Ilusión (Team Íñigo Errejón)	51,701	33.71
Podemos en Movimiento (Team Miguel Urbán/Teresa Rodríguez)	13,689	8.93
Juan Moreno Yagüe Political Document	1,324	0.86
Podemos en Equipo	700	0.46
Total	153,360	100.00
Valid votes	153,360	98.82
Invalid and blank ballots	1,830	1.18
Total votes	155,190	100.00
Source: Podemos

Organisational Document
Choice	Votes	%
Podemos Para Todas (Team Pablo Iglesias)	83,385	54.42
Recuperar la Ilusión (Team Íñigo Errejón)	53,415	34.86
Podemos en Movimiento (Team Miguel Urbán/Teresa Rodríguez)	15,333	10.01
Podemos en Equipo	1,092	0.71
Total	153,225	100.00
Valid votes	153,225	98.73
Invalid and blank ballots	1,965	1.27
Total votes	155,190	100.00
Source: Podemos

Ethical Document
Choice	Votes	%
Podemos Para Todas (Team Pablo Iglesias)	82,058	53.63
Recuperar la Ilusión (Team Íñigo Errejón)	51,710	33.79
Podemos en Movimiento (Team Miguel Urbán/Teresa Rodríguez)	17,797	11.63
Podemos en Equipo	1,451	0.95
Total	153,016	100.00
Valid votes	153,016	98.60
Invalid and blank ballots	2,174	1.40
Total votes	155,190	100.00
Source: Podemos

Equality Document
Choice	Votes	%
Feminismo En Movimiento Para Todas (Iglesias and Urbán)	93,536	61.68
Recuperar la Ilusión (Team Íñigo Errejón)	53,989	35.60
Podemos en Equipo	4,113	2.71
Total	151,638	100.00
Valid votes	151,638	97.71
Invalid and blank ballots	3,552	2.29
Total votes	155,190	100.00
Source: Podemos
