= José Ignacio Goirigolzarri =

Spanish economist and executive (born 1954)

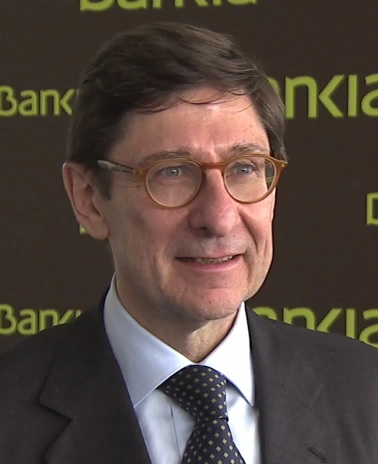
- Born: José Ignacio Goirigolzarri Tellaeche; 4 February 1954 (age 72); Bilbao, Spain
- Education: University of Deusto; University of Leeds
- Occupation: Executive Chairman of Bankia

José Ignacio Goirigolzarri Tellaeche (born 4 February 1954) is a Spanish economist and banking executive. He served as CEO of BBVA from 2001 to 2009, as Chairman of the state-owned holding BFA as well as its main subsidiary company, Bankia and from 2012 to 2021, and as Executive President of CaixaBank, Spain's largest bank, from 2021 to 2024.

== Early life and education ==
Goirigolzarri earned a bachelor's degree in Economics and Business Studies from the University of Deusto (Bilbao), and a degree in Strategic Finance and Planning from the University of Leeds.

== Career ==
Goirgolzarri began his professional career at Banco de Bilbao in 1977. In 1992, he was appointed as General Director at BBV. In 1999, BBV and Argentaria merged and Goirigolzarri was appointed as member of the Management Committee and head of the Latin-American businesses. He served as Vice Chairman of Telefónica and Repsol in 2002–2003. Goirigolzarri was president and COO of BBVA from 2001 to 2009, when he early-retired after working at the bank for 30 years. He received a lifelong pension of €3 million per year (starting from age 65), which caused an avalanche of public criticism.

On 9 May 2012, he became the president of Bankia, the fourth largest bank of Spain. On 25 May 2012, Bankia asked for €19 billion from the FROB, the Spanish bailout fund for banks. Bankia also revised its earnings statement for 2011, stating that instead of a profit of €309 million, it had in fact lost €4.3 billion before taxes. A number of limitations were imposed as a result of having received state aid. Shareholders had to share part of the burden of the capital injection, the balance sheet had to be reduced, dividends were restricted until 2014, and both the branch network (-39%) and workforce (-28%) had to be reduced. At the end of 2015, Bankia had fulfilled two years ahead of schedule all the targets set by the European Commission in the BFA-Bankia Group Restructuring Plan. The bank also reported the best efficiency, solvency and profitability among the six largest Spanish banks.

== Other activities ==
- Elcano Royal Institute for International and Strategic Studies, Member of the Board of Trustees
- Deusto Business School, chair of the Board

== Recognition ==
In 2016, Goirigolzarri was listed on the tenth place in the MERCO ranking of best Spanish business leaders. In 2017, he was listed seventh.

== Political and economic views ==
=== Education ===
In an article in October 2010, Goirigolzarri warned about the state of education in Spain. He noted that Spain has a high percentage (35%) of people that haven't finished high school, and also a very high percentage of university students. The intermediate group is significantly lower than in other countries. He also noted that university degrees do not fit the demand of the economy, and that no Spanish university was ranked among the top 200 universities in the world (excluding private business schools). As a reason for the lack of changes in education, he stated that educational changes do not have an effect in the short term, are politically complex and go beyond electoral periods. So they are politically unattractive.

“Although the improvement of the educational system is the most important variable for a country's productivity, for its competitiveness and, consequently, for wealth creation, the reality is that it has no priority on the political agenda. This should not lead us to discouragement, but on the contrary, to an energetic and committed approach, because on education depends our future, and that of our children.”

=== Financial crisis ===
In an article in November 2010, he stated that the financial crisis in Spain had been above all a crisis of over-indebtedness. "It is worth remembering how two years ago the mantra of some politicians was that it was necessary to increase lending volumes to maintain activity (in fact, in some countries public aid was linked to that goal). That noise has gradually disappeared... Because it did not make sense. Never have you ever left a crisis of over-indebtedness, increasing leverage."

=== Public banks ===
In June 2016, Goirigolzarri responded to Podemos, after the party said that it wanted to keep Bankia as a public entity. He stated, "I do not know any public banks that have worked". He recalled that when he entered Bankia four years ago, what he found was a concept of public banking that had to be rescued. He also said that the board of the entity was then formed by "politicians, employers and trade unions, and everyone knows where that model took us."
