= 2014 Podemos state party assembly =

| 15 September−15 November 2014 | 2016–17 → |
- Turnout: 107,488
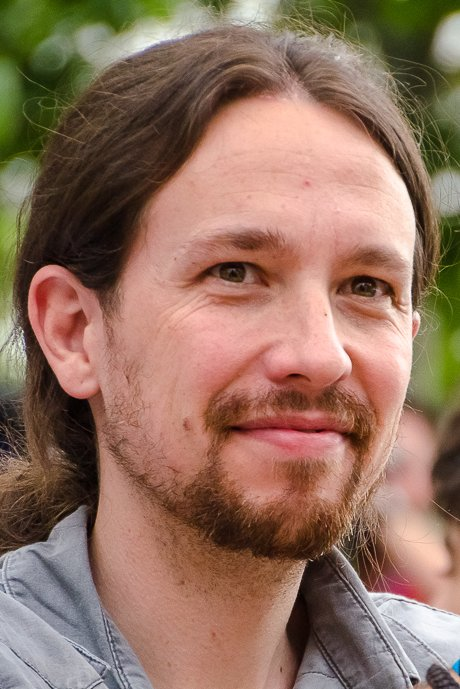

| Candidate | Pablo Iglesias | All others |
| Party | Podemos | Podemos |
| Popular vote | 95,311 | 3,076 |
| Percentage | 96.9% | 3.1% |
Previous Secretary General
None
Secretary General
Pablo Iglesias

The 2014 Podemos state assembly—officially the 1st Citizen Assembly, and more informally referred to as the Yes We Can assembly—was held between 15 September and 15 November 2014.

== Results ==
=== Secretary General ===
| Choice | Votes | % |
|---|---|---|
| Pablo Iglesias ✓ | 95,311 | 96.87 |
| Others | 3,076 | 3.13 |
| Valid votes | 98,387 | 91.53 |
| Invalid or blank votes | 9,101 | 8.47 |
| Total votes | 107,488 | 100.00 |
Source: Podemos

=== Documents ===
Political Document
| Choice | Votes | % |
|---|---|---|
| Claro que Podemos (Team Pablo Iglesias) ✓ | 90,451 | 92.08 |
| Construyendo Pueblo | 3,269 | 3.33 |
| Equipo Enfermeras | 2,022 | 2.06 |
| Democracia Radical | 1,611 | 1.64 |
| Democracia y Justicia Social | 874 | 0.89 |
| Valid votes | 98,227 | 87.65 |
| Invalid or blank votes | 13,843 | 12.35 |
| Total votes | 112,070 | 100.00 |
Source: Podemos

Organizational Document
| Choice | Votes | % |
|---|---|---|
| Claro que Podemos (Team Pablo Iglesias) ✓ | 90,451 | 85.24 |
| Sumando Podemos | 13,864 | 13.07 |
| Equipo Enfermeras | 867 | 0.82 |
| Juristas Madrid | 515 | 0.49 |
| Decide La Ciudadanía | 416 | 0.39 |
| Valid votes | 106,113 | 94.68 |
| Invalid or blank votes | 5,957 | 5.32 |
| Total votes | 112,070 | 100.00 |
Source: Podemos

Ethical Document
| Choice | Votes | % |
|---|---|---|
| Claro que Podemos (Team Pablo Iglesias) ✓ | 90,451 | 90.89 |
| Podemos: Participación, Transparencia y Democracia | 3,108 | 3.12 |
| Ética y Transparencia | 2,626 | 2.64 |
| Equipo Enfermeras | 2,261 | 2.27 |
| Equipo 10 Círculos | 1,069 | 1.07 |
| Valid votes | 99,515 | 88.80 |
| Invalid or blank votes | 12,555 | 11.20 |
| Total votes | 112,070 | 100.00 |
Source: Podemos
