= Juan Moreno Yagüe =

Spanish lawyer, activist and politician (1973-)

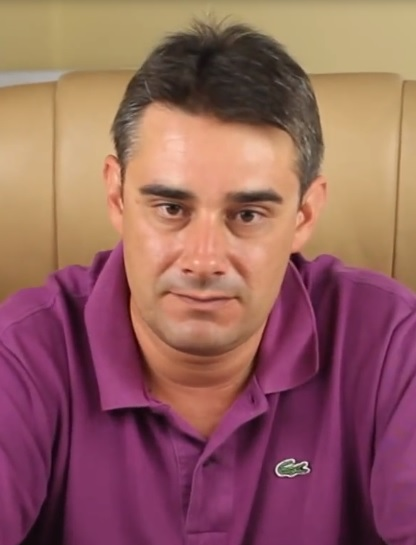

Member of the Parliament of Andalusia
- In office 2015–2018
- Constituency: Seville

Personal details
- Born: 29 May 1973 (age 52) Salamanca, Spain
- Occupation: Lawyer, politician

Juan Ignacio Moreno de Acevedo Yagüe (born 1973), better known as Juan Moreno Yagüe, is a Spanish lawyer, activist and politician. He is a specialist in banking, mortgages, and criminal and economic law.

== Biography ==
Born on 29 May 1973 in Salamanca to a family with a tradition in law, his mother a teacher and his father a judge, he is married with two children. He was raised in Villafranca de los Barros, Plasencia and Montijo before moving at age nine to Seville. After earning a Licentiate degree in Law, he unsuccessfully tried to pass the competitive public examinations in order to become a judge; he desisted and founded a law firm instead.

He took part in the 15-M Movement through ¡Democracia Real YA!. He also participated in the anti-eviction movement. Keen of the online alias hackabogado, Moreno Yagüe, promoter of initiatives such as Democracia 4.0, and #Opeuribor. He has been (2012-2014) one of the lawyers hired by 15MpaRato movement, the citizen platform that uncovered the Bankia Case that brought Rodrigo Rato to trial. He has taken part in the X Party since its inception, he ran 6th in the party list for the 2014 European Parliament election in Spain. The party failed to obtain representation. Moreno Yagüe ran 2nd in the Podemos list for Seville vis-à-vis the 2015 Andalusian regional election, and, elected, became a member of the 10th term of the Parliament of Andalusia, where he served as 3rd Vice-President of the governing board of the legislature.

In February 2017, he contested the Podemos leadership voting to determine the party's Secretary-General in the 2nd Citizen Assembly ("Vistalegre II"), presenting himself as the single alternative to the leadership of Pablo Iglesias. Running in a platform vouching for direct democracy, energy transition and free knowledge, he commanded the support of 15,700 members (10.9%) vs the 128,700 votes (89%) commanded by Iglesias. His policy manifesto was focussed on electronic voting and eliminating the bank payment system, replacing banks with a mobile application where each person manages his or her own money without having to rely on a bank to manage it.

In August and October 2017, he published two legal analyses on the unconstitutionality of the Spanish State Government's intervention of the Autonomy of Catalonia, in particular of the agreements relating to the application of Article 155 of the Spanish Constitution.
