= Open-source curriculum =

An open-source curriculum (OSC) is an online instructional resource that can be freely used, distributed and modified. OSC is based on the open-source practice of creating products or software that opens access to source materials or codes. Applied to education, this process invites feedback and participation from developers, educators, government officials, students and parents and empowers them to exchange ideas, improve best practices and create world-class curricula. These "development" communities can form ad-hoc, within the same subject area or around a common student need, and allow for a variety of editing and workflow structures.

== Examples ==
OSC repositories such as Wikiversity, Curriki – Global Learning & Education Community, MIT OpenCourseWare and Connexions are one way in which the concept of open-source curriculum is being explored. With these online repositories, a curriculum framework for a particular course is created by an instructional designer or author in conjunction with content experts. Learning objectives are clearly identified, and learning activities and instructional sequences and assessments are developed and offered to support the attainment of the objectives. However, all users (from students to educators) are empowered to add, delete, and modify the learning activities, resources and generally contribute to the learning environment. In short, each user contributes to the repository and is able to select curricula based on individual interests.

The Open Content Curriculum Project was initiated with MediaWiki software in 2005, and offers a standards-based K-12 curriculum that is collaboratively edited, contains teacher- and student-created resources, assessment rubrics, lesson plans, and instructional resources. All 10,500 pages of content, and 4,240 file uploads are Creative Commons licensed, and the system is used daily by the Bering Strait School District, an Alaska school district. The project welcomes use and active contributions by outside teachers, students and other interested parties. There are currently 2,500 registered users in the database.

The Free Technology Academy is a joint initiative of the Free Knowledge Institute and several European universities to provide master-level education on Free Software, Open Standards and related subjects. All FTA course books are openly published under copyleft licenses. Moreover, the FTA partners together with several other institutions have started a Taskforce for the collaborative design of an International Master Programme in Free Software.

The Saylor Foundation is a non-profit organization that produces new open-source educational content and curates existing open resources to support college-level courses. Its course outlines are licensed under a CC-BY license, making those outlines open-source curricula. Saylor has created nearly 241 college courses using open educational resources, making Saylor.org one of the largest currently-available collections of free courses on the web.

== Resources ==
- Futureofthebook.org
- eSchool News Online
- Open-source software in education
- Global Text
- EduCommons
- Creative Commons
- Free Technology Academy
- Peeragogy Handbook V1.0 Project
- Free High School Science Textbook project
- UK Innovation/Jorum (Open in UK only)
- EISTI-ESSEC – an EU based open courseware repository project with Vivendi involvement – Jean-Hugues Lauret
- Project Gutenberg
- The Internet Archive
- LAMS Community
- LAMS
- Wikiteach
- Common Curriculum - Allows organizations to create curriculum and connect to the teachers using it.
- Open Education Consortium
- Open educational practices
