= 2021 Podemos state party assembly =

2021 assembly in Alcorcón, Spain

← 2020	12−13 June 2021 (Voting: 6−12 June 2021)	2025 →
- Turnout: 53,443 (~10%)
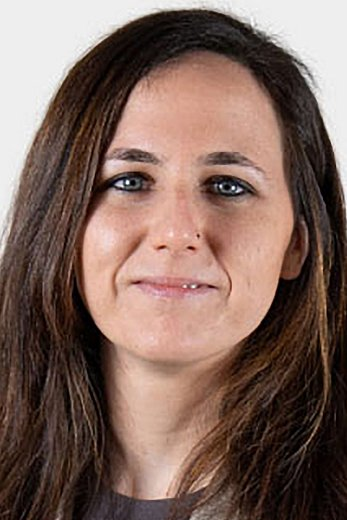

Candidate	Ione Belarra	Fernando Ángel Barredo
Popular vote	45,753	3,106
Percentage	85.6%	5.8%

The 2021 Podemos state assembly—officially the 4th Citizen Assembly, and more informally referred to as Vistalegre IV—was held during 12 and 13 June 2021. The assembly took place for the first place outside of Vistalegre, taking place in a venue in Alcorcón. Ione Belarra was elected Secretary-General with over 80% of the votes.

== Background ==
=== 2021 Madrilenian regional election ===
On 15 March 2021, Pablo Iglesias, leader of Podemos since its foundation, announced that he planned to resign from his post as Deputy Prime Minister of Spain to lead his party in the 2021 Madrilenian regional election, pointing at Yolanda Díaz, Minister of Labour, as his successor as leader of United We Can, a party coalition between Podemos and United Left, among others. Díaz was a member of the latter, therefore she could not lead Podemos in the eventuality of Iglesias resigning.

Podemos performed poorly in the election, placing fifth with 7.2% of votes, only a small increase. The overall result was a dramatic victory for the conservative People's Party, whom far-right Vox pledged to support. After the announcement of the results, Iglesias announced he would resign from his offices and retire from politics. He stated he had been turned into "a scapegoat" who "mobilizes the worst of those who hate democracy."

=== After Iglesias' resignation ===
Quickly after Iglesias resignation, Podemos leadership announced the start of the process to elect a new leadership to the party. Ione Belarra, who replaced Iglesias in his duties in the cabinet was seen as the preferred option by Podemos establishment to the post of Secretary-General.

The assembly was set to take place in Paco de Lucía auditorium, in Alcorcón, becoming the first time to take place outside Vistalegre arena, in Madrid. Iglesias refused to attend the assembly.

== Results ==
=== Secretary General ===
Podemos primary election results
Candidate	Votes	%
Ione Belarra	45,753	85.61
Fernando Ángel Barredo	3,106	5.81
Esteban Tettamanti Bogliaccini	2,730	5.12
Blank ballots	1,854	3.47
Total	53,443	100.00
Votes for options	51,589	96.53
Blank and invalid ballots	1,854	3.47
Total votes	53,443	100.00
Source: Podemos
