= 2020 Podemos state party assembly =

← 2016–17	15–21 May 2020	2021 →
- Registered: 219,158 active members (out of 516,492 members)
- Turnout: 59,201 (27%)
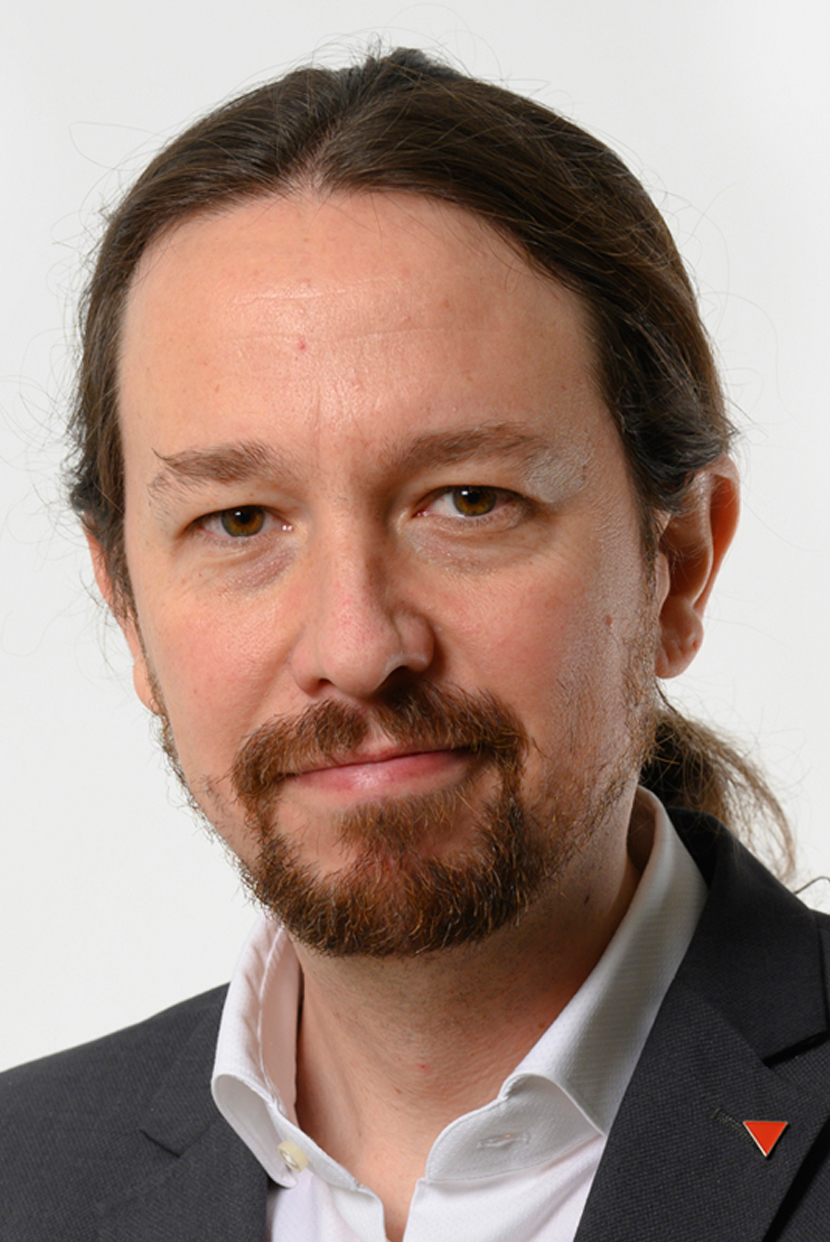

Candidate	Pablo Iglesias	Fernando Ángel Barredo
Popular vote	53,167	4,503
Percentage	92.2%	7.8%

The 2020 Podemos state assembly—officially the 3rd Citizen Assembly, and more informally referred to as Vistalegre III—was held virtually between 15 and 21 May 2020. The assembly was set to be celebrated on March, but the coronavirus pandemic in Spain delayed it until mid-May.

== Background ==
Pablo Iglesias, leader of Podemos, announced in January 2020 the celebration of the 3rd Citizen Assembly for March 2020, even though his mandate did not expire until February 2021. This decision was linked with the lack of contenders and the recent formation of the Spanish government, in which Podemos participated as the junior coalition partner.

However, due to the COVID-19 outbreak in Spain in early March, the Assembly was postponed and took place virtually.

== Results ==
=== Secretary General ===
Podemos primary election results
Candidate	Votes	%
Pablo Iglesias	53,167	92.19
Fernando Ángel Barredo	4,503	7.81
Total	57,670	100.00
Valid votes	57,670	97.41
Invalid and blank ballots	1.531	2.59
Total votes	59,201	100.00
Source: Podemos

=== State Citizen Council ===
Choice	Points	%	Won	%
Un Podemos contigo (Team Pablo Iglesias)	248,035,650	93.70	89	100.0
Nuevo impulso por la democracia interna en Podemos (Team Fernando Ángel Barredo)	9,457,559	3.57	0	0.00
Others	7,223,366	2.73	0	0.00
Total votes	264,716,575	100.00	89	100.00
Source: Podemos, Podemos
