= Global Text =

American nonprofit centered on education

The Global Text Project (GTP) is a not for profit organization dedicated to the creation, translation, and distribution of free open content textbooks over the Internet. It is an open educational resources project focusing on reaching university students mainly in developing countries, where textbooks are often expensive and not affordable. Textbooks are necessary and crucial for higher education, but they are becoming increasingly expensive, even in the United States. Between 1998 and 2014 textbook prices increased by 161 percent. And since 1977, textbook prices in the country have risen 1,041 percent, more than triple the overall rate of U.S. inflation. Two major reasons that could be affecting textbook prices are the constant publication of new editions, and extra material bundled into the textbooks.

== History ==
The Global Text Project was initiated in 2006 by Professors Don McCubbrey of the Daniels College of Business at the University of Denver and Rick Watson of the Terry College of Business at the University of Georgia. In 2007 the organization received funding from the Jacobs Foundation of Switzerland to move forward with a pilot test of the project.

The project's original intention was to share open-content textbooks in English, Arabic, Chinese, and Spanish freely via the Global Text website. Currently, the website has over 100 textbooks primarily available in English, but many in Spanish and Chinese as well. Translations are also underway into Arabic and Dari.

== Methodology ==
This project relies heavily on volunteers; however, the organization has found it challenging to engage volunteer translators in languages other than Spanish. Volunteers are currently enrolled as college or graduate students, and are bilingual to some extent. Other volunteers come from volunteer translator communities such as Translations for Progress and Translators Without Borders. Once a book has been chosen for translation based on global needs and availability of volunteer translators, work is allocated to a virtual team of translators using a Pyramid method.

=== The Pyramid Method ===
The Global Text Project developed this translation methodology to foster collaboration among student and other translators and engage them in the translation process. The Pyramid Method involves the following three steps:

1. The book to be translated is broken down into small segments for volunteers to translate, generally around 5 pages for novices.
2. Volunteers with a higher level proficiency review two or more segments and then pass several segments on for review by more experienced translators.
3. Finally, the entire book is reviewed by a professional with domain knowledge and who is fluently bilingual. The book is then published on the Global Text website.

== See also ==
- Developing country
- Education in Africa, History of education
- Open source curriculum
- Wikibooks, Textbook
