= David Bravo Bueno =

Spanish lawyer

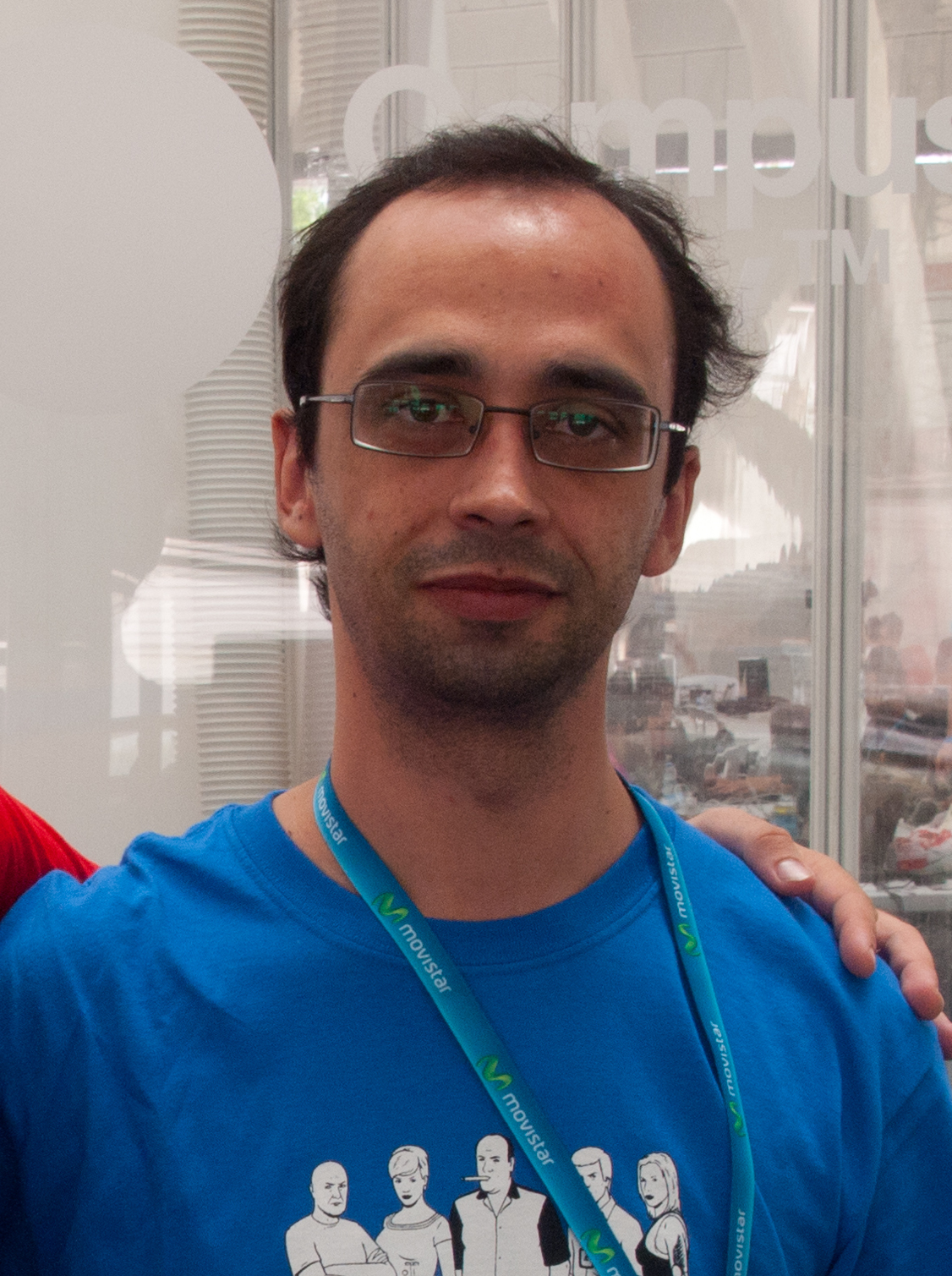

Member of the Congress of Deputies
- In office 13 January 2016 – 3 May 2016
- Constituency: Almería

Personal details
- Born: David Bravo Bueno; 20 February 1978 (age 47); Sevilla, Spain
- Political party: Podemos

David Bravo Bueno (born 20 February 1978) is a Spanish lawyer specialized in intellectual property rights. He is well known for his strong defense of the right to make a private copy of copyrighted works, as it is explicitly allowed by the Spanish legislation. He is often requested to participate in TV debates about so-called piracy and p2p file sharing.

== Private copy ==
Bravo argues that downloading files is undoubtedly legal and uploading, although more controversial, is surely not a crime, within the current Spanish legislation. His views are grounded mainly on the Intellectual Propierty Law (1996), Article 31, 2nd Chapter, "Reproduction without authorization" and the Penal Code, Article 270. The SGAE (General Association of Authors and Editors) strongly disagrees with Bravo and the Spanish government often makes campaigns backing SGAE's views on the matter.

== Books ==
- Copia este libro (Copy this book): among many other issues, Bravo discusses how the current Spanish legislation allows the right to copy copyrighted works without the author's consent ("private copy").
