= Miguel Brieva =

Spanish cartoonist

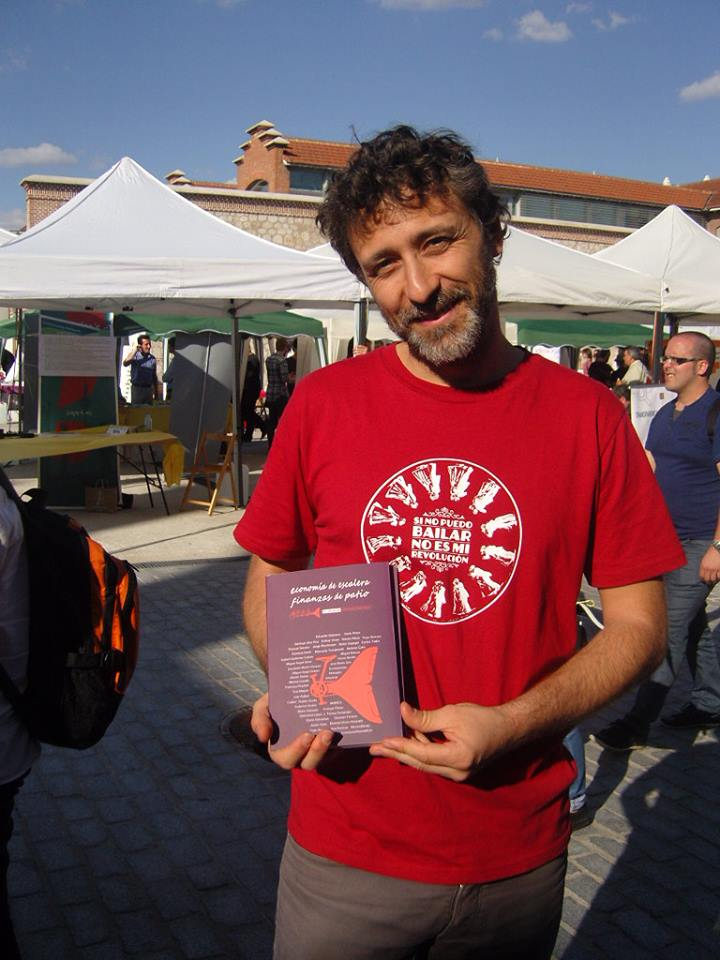

Miguel Brieva (born Seville, 1974) is a Spanish cartoonist.

Brieva is well known for cartoons in the style of advertisements of the 1950s-1960s in El País, Rolling Stone, and El Jueves.

== Works ==
- Enciclopedia Clismón -(Clismón's encyclopedia) (Mondadori publishers, 2007).
- Dinero (Money) (Mondadori publishers, 2008).
- El Otro Mundo (The Other World) (Mondadori publishers, 2009).
- Memorias de la Tierra (Earth's Memories) (Mondadori publishers, 2012).
- Obras incompletas de Marcz Doplacie (Incomplete works of Marcz Doplacie) (Belleza Infinita, 2012).
- Lo que (me) está pasando (What is Happening (to me)) (Reservoir Books, 2015).
