= José Sevilla =

Spanish executive (born 1964)

- Born: José Sevilla Álvarez; 1964 (age 61–62); Madrid, Spain
- Education: CUNEF
- Occupation: President Unicaja

José Sevilla Álvarez (born 1964) is a Spanish executive. He is the current President of Unicaja, a position he has held since 2024.

== Career ==
Sevilla holds a degree in Economics and Business Studies from the Colegio Universitario de Estudios Financieros (CUNEF), which is affiliated to the Complutense University of Madrid. He began his career in the investment banking sector, and worked at Merrill Lynch and FG Inversiones Bursatiles. Sevilla worked at BBVA from 1997 to 2009, and was member of the Management Committee from 2003 to 2009. He joined Bankia as an executive director in May 2012. On 30 June 2014, he was appointed as CEO of Bankia.

== Political and economic views ==
=== Savings banks ===
In an interview on Bankia's restructuring in August 2015, he stated: "The first thing we did when we came here was to change all the board members. Our challenge was to change the corporate governance, change the board with no link at all to politicians, to technocrats," he said. "For us, no politicians on the board was a must. We don’t want to have any political influence. We analysed the CVs of board candidates looking for political connections. If we found it, it was 'No'."

Sevilla stated that market discipline was not something many savings banks knew or cared about. "It was not clear who were the owners of these entities. They were not listed, they did not have shares. The traditional owners of the cajas were the depositors. Their status was very unclear." He continued: "The boards of these entities didn’t feel any special responsibility, they were growing and didn’t perceive any difficulty and were not aware of the potential consequences of their actions, or their inaction."
