= Lo que tú Quieras Oír =

The full video

Lo que tú quieras oír (Whatever You Want To Hear) is a Spanish language short drama by Guillermo Zapata added to YouTube on March 26, 2006. The video is notable for being the most-watched non-English video on YouTube, the third most-viewed video excluding music videos, and the twelfth most viewed of all time, with over 100 million viewings.

The film was released under a Creative Commons license, meaning that it is reusable and remixable by anyone, if the resulting creation is itself used according to certain criteria. As a Spanish video it has received considerably less media and viral attention than other popular English-language YouTube videos. A version with English subtitles has been released, but has proved much less popular.

== Plot summary ==
The plot centers around "Sofia", who returns home to find a voicemail from her husband, "Miguel", announcing that he has left her. Sofia is initially depressed, but decides to remix the voice-mail so that it sounds like Miguel telling her that he loves her and that he is sorry for leaving her and asking for forgiveness. Sofia then tells the remixed-voicemail that she will not take Miguel back.
