= Free Knowledge Institute =

Non-profit organisation

The Free Knowledge Institute
- Founded: 2006
- Founders: Wouter Tebbens; Hinde ten Berge; David Jacovkis
- Type: Non-profit organisation
- Purpose: Promotion of free knowledge
- Location: Amsterdam, Netherlands
- Key people: Wouter Tebbens; Hinde ten Berge; David Jacovkis; Franco Iacomella
- Website: www.freeknowledge.eu

The Free Knowledge Institute (FKI) is a nonprofit organisation founded in 2006 in the Netherlands. Inspired by the free software movement, the FKI fosters the free exchange of knowledge in all areas of society by promoting freedom of use, modification, copying, and distribution of knowledge about education, technology, culture, and science.

The FKI coordinates and participates in projects concerning education, access to knowledge, intellectual property, and open educational resources.

== Principles ==
The Free Knowledge Institute has formulated a set of principles that it considers basic for being consistent with its vision. These founding principles take as a starting point the sharing of knowledge in the tradition of copyleft and include the use of free software, adherence to open standards, the importance of education, respect for diversity and different cultures, transparency and consensus.

== Activities ==
In order to work towards this vision, the Free Knowledge Institute participates in political debates and activism to highlight the wrongs of certain policies and propose alternatives. For that reason, the FKI works together in various networks and coalitions with other groups and organisations. With the Open Net Coalition, a collective warning has been formulated about policy proposals in the EU parliament threatening internet neutrality.

== Projects ==
Free Knowledge, Free Technology Conference

The Free Knowledge, Free Technology Conference (FKFT) was an event that centered on the production and sharing of educational and training materials in the field of Free Software and Open Standards. It was held first in 2008 in Barcelona and was organised by the SELF Project and the Free Knowledge Institute.

Free Technology Academy

The Free Technology Academy consists of an advanced virtual campus with course modules that can be followed entirely online. The learning materials are Open Educational Resources that can be studied freely, but learners enrolled in the FTA will be guided by professional teaching staff from the participating universities. The full master programme can be concluded at one of the universities. The project financially supported by the Life Long Learning Programme (LLP) of the European Commission, is a collaboration between the FKI and various European universities and organisations like the Open Universiteit Nederland (OUNL) from The Netherlands, the Open University of Catalonia (UOC) from Spain and others.

Free Culture Forum

The Free Culture Forum was an international meeting regarding free culture and knowledge that took place in Barcelona from 30 October to 1 November 2009. It took place jointly with the second edition of the oXcars. During the Forum 200 organizations and individuals linked to free culture expressions discuss on the privatization of the creation and the intellectual property and its incidence in the access to the knowledge and the creation and distribution of the art, knowledge and culture. The Forum ended up with the definition of a "Charter for Innovation, Creativity and Access to Knowledge". The first edition of the Forum was organised by Exgae, Networked politics and the Free Knowledge Institute.

SELF Project

SELF (Science, Education and Learning in Freedom) is an international project that was initially financed by the European Commission with the goal of developing a platform to encourage creative cooperation and the sharing of educational and training materials concerning free software and open standards.The SELF Platform is open for viewing and contributing to all users.
