= Hervé Falciani =

French-Italian systems engineer and whistleblower

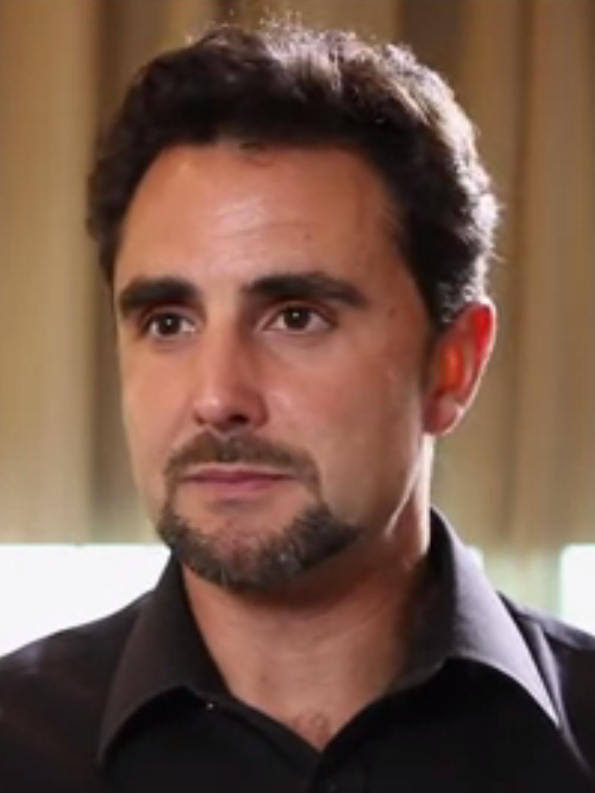
- Hervé Falciani in 2013
- Born: Hervé Daniel Marcel Falciani; January 9, 1972 (age 54); Monte Carlo, Monaco
- Education: Sophia Antipolis
- Occupation: Systems engineer
- Known for: Lagarde list

Hervé Falciani during an interview in 2013

Hervé Daniel Marcel Falciani (Italian: [falˈtʃaːni]; born 9 January 1972) is a French-Italian systems engineer and whistleblower who is credited with "the biggest banking leak in history." In 2008, Falciani began collaborating with numerous European nations by providing allegedly illegal stolen information relating to more than 130,000 suspected tax evaders with Swiss bank accounts – specifically those with accounts in HSBC's Swiss subsidiary HSBC Private Bank.

Falciani created the "Lagarde list", a list of HSBC clients who allegedly used the bank to evade taxes and launder money. Falciani leaked the list to ex-French Finance Minister Christine Lagarde (currently the President of the European Central Bank). Lagarde, in turn, sent the list to governments whose citizens were on the list.

On 11 December 2014, Falciani was indicted in absentia by the Swiss federal government for violating the country's bank secrecy laws and for industrial espionage. The indictment accused Falciani of stealing information from HSBC's Geneva offices and passing it on to tax authorities in France. HSBC had been indicted in France for money laundering in November 2014. In November 2015, Switzerland's federal court sentenced Falciani to five years in prison – the "longest sentence ever demanded by the confederation's public ministry in a case of banking data theft". Falciani was accused of "aggravated financial espionage, data theft and violation of commercial and banking secrecy".

== Biography ==
After studying at the Sophia Antipolis technology park, Falciani became a computer engineer at the Swiss branch of HSBC, where he worked between 2001 and 2008. In 2006, he reorganized the database of the organization to improve its security. Falciani has declared that he realized that the way data was managed at HSBC fostered tax evasion, and proposed a new system, which was rejected by his superiors. After the HSBC reaction, and because he believed that "it is a systematic violation of fundamental rights of citizens by subtracting funds that should be allocated to the general interest", for two years Falciani collected evidence of potential tax fraud involving 130,000 individuals. Falciani tried to make the information available to the Swiss judicial authorities, but was unsuccessful. This claim was corroborated by French prosecutors.

In 2008, Falciani made a trip to Beirut and, using a false identity, attempted to sell what he claimed was private client information from a Swiss bank to Bank Audi. Falciani claims that he did this in order to intentionally activate an internal alarm system available to Swiss banking employers, the Swiss Bankers Association (Swissbanking), and which is monitored by the police. He hoped this would allow Swiss prosecutors to become aware of HSBC's criminal activities. In their prosecution against him, however, Swiss authorities claimed that he went to Beirut with the intention of selling the data for profit. In either case, an alarm was indeed set off after a woman reported that a man calling himself Ruben al-Chidiak had attempted to sell her the private data. Falciani says he paid for the airline tickets from his own HSBC account so that authorities could track him.

On 22 December 2008, Falciani was arrested, questioned and released. On release, Falciani travelled to France where he was arrested in January 2009, forcing the Swiss judiciary to issue an international arrest warrant for him. Switzerland called on France to search his home and to seize the laptop used to send the files. After searching the address, the prosecutor of Nice, Eric de Montgolfier, opened his own investigation, not against Falciani, but against alleged tax fraudsters appearing in the list. The so-called Falciani list remains in France. An international collaboration began with various judicial authorities and remains ongoing. The Falciani list created a diplomatic incident between Switzerland and France. The latter finally agreed to return the data, but only after the contents had been examined. Afterwards Falciani fled to Spain on the advice of the U.S. government because "it would be easy for someone to pay" to try to kill him. Upon arrival, he was arrested in Barcelona in July 2012, due to the Swiss international warrant.

He was jailed at Valdemoro prison (Madrid), waiting for the Audiencia Nacional to decide on his extradition to Switzerland. On 18 December 2012, the Audiencia Nacional released him provisionally. It was in maximum security conditions: eight bodyguards and bulletproof vest. After that Falciani hid in Spain under a system of maximum security protection sponsored by the UN. Finally, on 8 May 2013, Falciani was released. The Audiencia Nacional, given the ongoing collaboration between Spanish and French courts, decided not to extradite Falciani, the reason being that he had provided information indicative of "severely irregular" suspicious activity, and of illegal and criminal offenses. He was released because in Spain there is no legal concept of bank secrecy, and information technology trade secrets can not be used to hide unlawful activities. In April 2014, Falciani was called to assist the Argentine federal taxation agency (AFIP) in the fight against money laundering.

Falciani published a book about his experience in the HSBC scandal called Séisme sur la planète finance (Earthquake on Planet Finance in English) that was published in April 2015. He lived in Paris for a time, but continued working with Spanish authorities, and stood as a candidate in Spanish elections for the anti-corruption X Party. In April 2018 he was again arrested in Madrid and again released in September after a Spanish high court rejected the extradition request on the grounds that the Spanish legal code does not recognize ‘aggravated financial espionage’.

== Political activity ==
Hervé Falciani was first in the electoral list of the new Spanish political party Citizen Network X Party for the European elections of 2014. He was elected by citizens in Internet through open lists. Finally the X Party did not obtain any seats.

In February 2015, it was announced that Falciani will collaborate with the Spanish party Podemos to draft measures against tax evasion for the party's political program.

== Controversy ==
Falciani claims he was kidnapped by Israeli Mossad agents in Geneva, who were seeking information on bank clients with Hezbollah ties.

Falciani claims that his motives are to repel Switzerland's "attack" on other countries' tax laws and exchequers. HSBC's position is that Falciani is not a whistleblower, that he has instead tried to sell, not release, the stolen data, and only started to cooperate with authorities after being imprisoned in Spain. Regarding this allegation the Audiencia Nacional, a high court in Spain, stated that "this fact" (the court's quotation marks in reference to the allegation):

appears somewhat confused and inconsistent with the factual story that we present, which do seem objectively specific episodes of provision of information and effective collaboration with authorities of other states, which indicates a determined attitude of Falciani and not an economic motivation.

== Indictment ==
Falciani was indicted by Switzerland on 11 December 2014, for violating the country's bank secrecy laws and for industrial espionage. Falciani (who was not named in the indictment, as is customary for Switzerland) was charged with stealing information from HSBC's Geneva offices and passing it on to French tax authorities. The Swiss prosecutors said they were willing to try Falciani in absentia for his alleged crimes.

In the month prior to his indictment, France had indicted HSBC for money laundering. Falciani had also offered his services to the government of India, which had been investigating money laundering abetted by HSBC. The Swiss government had refused to help the Indian government in its investigation of Indian citizens who were abetted in tax evasion by HSBC on the basis that the information detailing HSBC's alleged transgression was stolen.

In an interview with the Indian television network NDTV, Falciani said that Switzerland indicted him as part of an "agenda" to stifle whistleblowers like himself who have exposed corruption in the Swiss banking industry.

== See also ==
- Lagarde list
- Panama Papers
- Swiss Leaks
- Tax evasion
- Rudolf Elmer
