= Miguel Blesa =

Spanish banker (1947–2017)

Miguel Blesa de la Parra
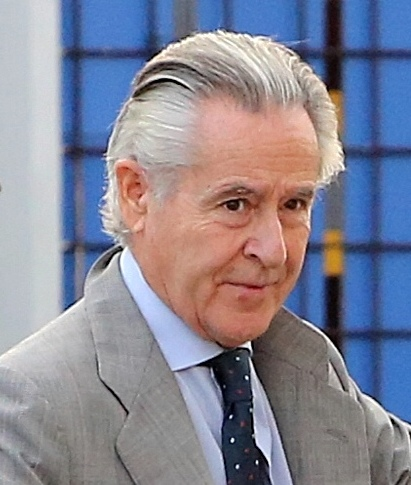
- Blesa in 2016
- Born: 8 August 1947; Linares, Spain
- Died: 19 July 2017 (aged 69); Villanueva del Rey, Spain
- Occupation: Banker
- Known for: Chairman of Caja Madrid, 1996–2010

Miguel Blesa de la Parra (8 August 1947 – 19 July 2017) was a Spanish banker, the chairman of the Spanish bank Caja Madrid from 1996 to 2009.

In February 2017, Blesa was sentenced to a six-year jail term in connection with the widespread misuse of company credit cards during his long tenure as chairman of Caja Madrid, but remained at liberty pending the outcome of an appeal to the Supreme Court.

Blesa was found dead on a private hunting estate in the province of Córdoba on 19 July 2017, with a shotgun wound to the chest. The autopsy on 20 July confirmed that he killed himself. The press noted that Blesa was one of a number of people involved in scandals such as the Gürtel case to die while court proceedings were pending, and it was reported that his heirs would be liable for damages to the harmed (assuming that they accept their inheritance).

He received a Golden Medal from the Real Academia de la Historia, and was awarded as Mejor Presidente de Entidad Financiera 2005 by Banca 15.
