= Rato (disambiguation) =

Rato is a village in Haiti.

Rato or RATO may also refer to:

- Rato (surname)
- Rato (Lisbon Metro), a station of the Lisbon Metro in Portugal
- Rato Dratsang, a Buddhist monastery in Central Tibet
- Rocket-assisted take-off (RATO)
- Rato, nickname of Ratomir
