= Miguel Ángel Furones =

Spanish writer and creative director (1949–2021)

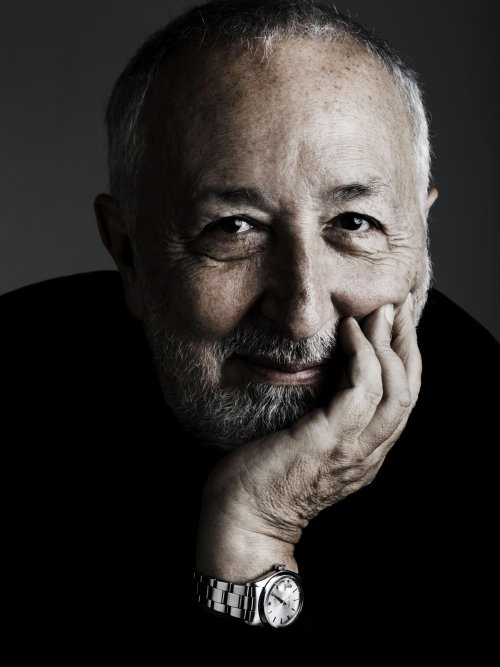
- Born: 5 July 1949; Madrid, Spain
- Died: 28 April 2021 (aged 71); Madrid, Spain
- Education: Complutense University of Madrid; Centro Español de Nuevas Profesiones
- Occupations: Publicist and writer

Miguel Ángel Furones (5 July 1949 – 28 April 2021) was a Spanish publicist and writer. He was worldwide creative director of Leo Burnett Worldwide and the non-executive chairman of Publicis Communications Group in Spain.

== Advertising career ==
He studied Sociology at the Complutense University of Madrid and Advertising at CENP (Spanish Center for New Professions). He began his career in Spain, as a creative at J. Walter Thompson. Soon after, he received an offer at Contrapunto, and switched agencies in 1978. After two years, and encouraged by Contrapunto itself, he decided to set up his own agency, Vitruvio-30, in Madrid. In 1990, Vitruvio merged with the American multinational agency Leo Burnett. Miguel Ángel was appointed president of Leo Burnett Spain and Portugal, and later creative director of Leo Burnett Europe, Middle East and Africa.

Vitruvio Leo Burnett's Madrid branch was named Global Agency of the Year of Leo Burnett Worldwide three times in less than six years. During this period he also served as president of the Spanish Association of Advertising Agencies (AEAP), and was president of the jury for the advertising festivals in San Sebastian, FIAP, Golden Drum and El Chupete.

In 2001 he was appointed Deputy Chief Creative Officer, and shortly thereafter Chief Creative Officer Worldwide of Leo Burnett, replacing Michael Conrad.3 He was the fourth Chief Creative Officer Worldwide of the agency since its founder, Leo Burnett, opened it in 1935. Among his responsibilities was to analyze every quarter more than a thousand ads from 2000 creatives around the world. On 17 December 2007, his retirement from the professional world was announced, remaining as a consultant to the new president of the company.4 After a year of retirement, he returned to the working world, to found the agency Ignitionk in Madrid. He was president of the advertising agency Publicis, which is based in Madrid.

In November 2009 he was named head of Publicis Iberia, replacing José Manuel Pardo. He held this position until December 2017, when he moved to an honorary position within the company. In 2016 he was named country chairman of Publicis Communications España.

== Judicial prosecution ==
On 23 November 2015, and after testifying in the Court of Instruction nº31 of Madrid, the judge charged Miguel Ángel Furones, then president of Publicis, and two other executives for the crimes of money laundering, against the Public Treasury and corruption among individuals after designing the campaign for the IPO of Bankia in a case known as the "Rato case". On 1 March 2021, after completing the investigation of the case, the judge definitively prosecuted Furones.

== Writing career ==
He began with a work on advertising, El mundo de la publicidad, published by Salvat in 1980. He would later write a book of poems called El color de las palabras, a book of short stories, Quince historias que vienen a cuento (Nuer Ediciones, 1999) and an essay on the Internet called Tres mil años de Internet, in 2010. In 2012 he published his first novel El escritor de anuncios (Suma de Letras), which was published in Mexico and in some Latin American countries. His second novel, Primera Clase, was published in 2014 also by the same publisher. His third work was El Té de Kunming. His last novel, Todo dura nada, was published in December 2020.

== Death ==
He died in Madrid on 28 April 2021, from COVID-19 during the COVID-19 pandemic in Spain at the age of 71.
