= Leadership opinion polling for the 2004 Spanish general election =

In the run up to the 2004 Spanish general election, various organisations carried out opinion polling to gauge the opinions that voters hold towards political leaders. Results of such polls are displayed in this article. The date range for these opinion polls is from the previous general election, held on 12 March 2000, to the day the next election was held, on 14 March 2004.

== Preferred prime minister ==
The tables below list opinion polling on leader preferences to become prime minister.

=== Rajoy vs. Zapatero ===
Polling firm/Commissioner	Fieldwork date	Sample size			Other/ None/ Not care	Question	Lead
Polling firm/Commissioner	Fieldwork date	Sample size	Rajoy PP	Rodríguez Zapatero PSOE	Other/ None/ Not care	Question	Lead
Opina/Cadena SER	7 Mar 2004	?	35.8	40.7	8.6	14.8	4.9
Opina/Cadena SER	6 Mar 2004	?	35.8	39.4	8.7	16.1	3.6
Opina/Cadena SER	5 Mar 2004	?	35.8	39.1	8.5	16.6	3.3
Opina/Cadena SER	4 Mar 2004	?	36.6	38.1	8.5	16.7	1.5
Opina/Cadena SER	3 Mar 2004	?	36.9	37.9	8.5	16.6	1.0
Vox Pública/El Periódico	1–3 Mar 2004	2,071	40.6	42.6	16.8		2.0
Noxa/La Vanguardia	27 Feb–3 Mar 2004	2,200	41.0	50.0	–	9.0	9.0
Opina/Cadena SER	2 Mar 2004	?	36.6	38.0	8.9	16.4	1.4
Opina/Cadena SER	1 Mar 2004	?	36.1	38.2	9.7	16.0	2.1
Opina/El País	27 Feb–1 Mar 2004	4,000	33.8	37.6	4.4	24.2	3.8
Opina/Cadena SER	29 Feb 2004	?	37.0	37.3	10.6	15.1	0.3
Opina/Cadena SER	28 Feb 2004	?	37.2	36.4	11.1	15.4	0.8
Opina/Cadena SER	27 Feb 2004	?	37.5	35.9	10.3	16.2	1.6
Opina/Cadena SER	26 Feb 2004	3,000	36.9	37.1	9.1	16.9	0.2
ASEP	16–21 Feb 2004	1,212	34.2	35.1	15.2	15.5	0.9
CIS	24 Jan–15 Feb 2004	24,109	33.0	34.1	7.7	25.2	1.1
Noxa/La Vanguardia	6–12 Feb 2004	1,800	41.0	49.0	–	10.0	8.0
Opina/Cadena SER	11 Feb 2004	1,000	36.8	38.5	8.3	16.4	1.7
Opina/Cadena SER	31 Jan 2004	1,000	38.2	37.0	5.9	18.9	1.2
Opina/El País	25 Jan 2004	3,000	37.3	35.6	6.0	21.1	1.7
ASEP	19–24 Jan 2004	1,201	34.6	35.3	15.6	14.4	0.7
Vox Pública/El Periódico	19–21 Jan 2004	1,501	39.4	42.0	18.6		2.6
Opina/Cadena SER	16 Jan 2004	1,000	39.3	36.7	8.7	15.3	2.6
Noxa/La Vanguardia	7–9 Jan 2004	1,000	47.0	42.0	–	11.0	5.0
Opina/Cadena SER	2 Jan 2004	?	38.5	38.6	4.6	18.3	0.1
Opina/Cadena SER	19 Nov 2003	1,000	38.2	37.1	4.9	19.8	1.1
Opina/Cadena SER	24 Sep 2003	1,000	36.5	36.9	5.9	20.7	0.4
Vox Pública/El Periódico	22–24 Sep 2003	1,502	43.1	38.2	18.7		4.9
Opina/Cadena SER	10 Sep 2003	?	38.8	36.8	3.9	20.5	2.0
Opina/El País	7 Sep 2003	1,000	39.1	36.8	3.7	20.4	2.3
Vox Pública/El Periódico	23–25 Jun 2003	1,502	35.9	50.2	13.9		14.3
Noxa/La Vanguardia	22–24 Apr 2003	1,000	38.0	53.0	–	9.0	15.0
Vox Pública/El Periódico	31 Mar–2 Apr 2003	1,503	28.3	57.9	13.8		29.6
Opina/El País	25–26 Mar 2003	1,000	25.0	40.5	2.8	31.7	15.5
Opina/El País	3 Feb 2003	1,000	24.6	37.3	1.6	36.5	12.7
Vox Pública/El Periódico	13–16 Jan 2003	1,501	32.7	50.2	17.1		17.5
Opina/Cadena SER	4 Dec 2002	1,000	29.1	41.8	1.2	27.9	12.7
Opina/El País	23–24 Nov 2002	1,000	28.7	39.8	0.8	30.7	11.1
Opina/Cadena SER	9 Oct 2002	1,000	34.4	41.6	0.6	23.4	7.2
Vox Pública/El Periódico	7–9 Oct 2002	1,507	31.2	51.0	17.8		19.8
Opina/El País	29 Sep 2002	?	30.8	42.0	1.8	25.4	11.2
Opina/Cadena SER	27 Aug 2002	1,000	28.6	40.2	1.8	29.5	11.6
Opina/Cadena SER	27 Jun 2002	1,000	27.0	36.7	3.8	32.5	9.7
Vox Pública/El Periódico	24–26 Jun 2002	1,504	31.3	48.5	20.2		17.2
Opina/Cadena SER	8 May 2002	1,000	30.1	34.0	2.0	33.9	3.9
Vox Pública/El Periódico	15–17 Apr 2002	1,510	29.4	48.6	22.0		19.2
Vox Pública/El Periódico	4–5 Feb 2002	1,506	31.6	51.1	17.3		19.5
Vox Pública/El Periódico	22–23 Oct 2001	1,509	29.9	48.4	21.7		18.5
Vox Pública/El Periódico	25–28 Jun 2001	1,506	25.4	51.9	22.7		26.5
Vox Pública/El Periódico	16–18 Apr 2001	1,514	28.4	45.5	26.1		17.1
Vox Pública/El Periódico	29–31 Jan 2001	1,519	25.0	49.6	25.4		24.6
Vox Pública/El Periódico	30–31 Oct 2000	1,210	27.8	44.7	27.5		16.9

=== Mayor Oreja vs. Zapatero ===
Polling firm/Commissioner	Fieldwork date	Sample size			Other/ None/ Not care	Question	Lead
Polling firm/Commissioner	Fieldwork date	Sample size	Mayor Oreja PP	Rodríguez Zapatero PSOE	Other/ None/ Not care	Question	Lead
Vox Pública/El Periódico	23–25 Jun 2003	1,502	38.4	48.2	13.4		9.8
Vox Pública/El Periódico	31 Mar–2 Apr 2003	1,503	32.3	54.9	12.8		22.6
Opina/El País	25–26 Mar 2003	1,000	26.7	39.8	2.7	30.8	13.1
Opina/El País	3 Feb 2003	1,000	29.4	36.1	1.8	32.7	6.7
Vox Pública/El Periódico	13–16 Jan 2003	1,501	37.2	46.2	16.6		9.0
Opina/Cadena SER	4 Dec 2002	1,000	29.5	42.7	1.6	26.2	13.2
Opina/El País	23–24 Nov 2002	1,000	29.8	40.1	0.8	29.3	10.3
Opina/Cadena SER	9 Oct 2002	1,000	35.7	40.5	0.5	23.3	4.8
Vox Pública/El Periódico	7–9 Oct 2002	1,507	37.2	45.9	16.9		8.7
Opina/El País	29 Sep 2002	?	33.9	40.1	1.7	24.3	6.2
Opina/Cadena SER	27 Aug 2002	1,000	28.9	39.8	2.0	29.3	10.9
Opina/Cadena SER	27 Jun 2002	1,000	30.2	35.9	2.9	31.0	5.7
Vox Pública/El Periódico	24–26 Jun 2002	1,504	38.4	43.7	17.9		5.3
Opina/Cadena SER	8 May 2002	1,000	31.4	33.9	1.9	32.8	2.5
Vox Pública/El Periódico	15–17 Apr 2002	1,510	36.8	43.2	20.0		6.4
Vox Pública/El Periódico	4–5 Feb 2002	1,506	38.6	44.5	16.9		5.9

=== Rato vs. Zapatero ===
Polling firm/Commissioner	Fieldwork date	Sample size			Other/ None/ Not care	Question	Lead
Polling firm/Commissioner	Fieldwork date	Sample size	Rato PP	Rodríguez Zapatero PSOE	Other/ None/ Not care	Question	Lead
Vox Pública/El Periódico	23–25 Jun 2003	1,502	35.4	49.8	14.8		14.4
Noxa/La Vanguardia	22–24 Apr 2003	1,000	38.0	55.0	–	7.0	17.0
Vox Pública/El Periódico	31 Mar–2 Apr 2003	1,503	29.1	58.0	12.9		28.9
Opina/El País	25–26 Mar 2003	1,000	24.6	40.0	2.9	32.5	15.4
Opina/El País	3 Feb 2003	1,000	26.1	36.0	2.1	35.8	9.9
Vox Pública/El Periódico	13–16 Jan 2003	1,501	32.3	49.8	17.9		17.5
Opina/Cadena SER	4 Dec 2002	1,000	28.9	42.4	1.8	26.9	13.5
Opina/El País	23–24 Nov 2002	1,000	27.8	40.0	0.8	31.4	12.2
Opina/Cadena SER	9 Oct 2002	1,000	32.9	42.6	0.5	24.0	9.7
Vox Pública/El Periódico	7–9 Oct 2002	1,507	32.2	49.8	18.0		17.6
Opina/El País	29 Sep 2002	?	30.4	42.5	1.6	25.5	12.1
Opina/Cadena SER	27 Aug 2002	1,000	27.0	41.2	1.9	29.9	14.2
Opina/Cadena SER	27 Jun 2002	1,000	26.8	36.8	3.9	32.5	10.0
Vox Pública/El Periódico	24–26 Jun 2002	1,504	31.4	48.9	19.7		17.5
Opina/Cadena SER	8 May 2002	1,000	28.9	34.3	2.5	34.3	5.4
Vox Pública/El Periódico	15–17 Apr 2002	1,510	31.1	48.1	20.8		17.0
Vox Pública/El Periódico	4–5 Feb 2002	1,506	32.3	49.7	18.0		17.4
Vox Pública/El Periódico	22–23 Oct 2001	1,509	30.6	48.5	20.9		17.9
Vox Pública/El Periódico	25–28 Jun 2001	1,506	30.9	48.2	20.9		17.3
Vox Pública/El Periódico	16–18 Apr 2001	1,514	31.0	43.6	25.4		12.6
Vox Pública/El Periódico	29–31 Jan 2001	1,519	30.9	46.3	22.8		15.4
Vox Pública/El Periódico	30–31 Oct 2000	1,210	35.6	39.1	25.3		3.5

=== Gallardón vs. Zapatero ===
Polling firm/Commissioner	Fieldwork date	Sample size			Other/ None/ Not care	Question	Lead
Polling firm/Commissioner	Fieldwork date	Sample size	Ruiz- Gallardón PP	Rodríguez Zapatero PSOE	Other/ None/ Not care	Question	Lead
Opina/Cadena SER	4 Dec 2002	1,000	28.4	42.6	1.4	27.6	14.2
Opina/Cadena SER	9 Oct 2002	1,000	32.2	43.8	0.6	23.4	11.6
Opina/El País	29 Sep 2002	?	30.7	41.3	1.6	26.3	10.6
Opina/Cadena SER	27 Aug 2002	1,000	25.0	39.6	2.4	33.0	14.6

=== Acebes vs. Zapatero ===
Polling firm/Commissioner	Fieldwork date	Sample size			Other/ None/ Not care	Question	Lead
Polling firm/Commissioner	Fieldwork date	Sample size	Acebes PP	Rodríguez Zapatero PSOE	Other/ None/ Not care	Question	Lead
Opina/Cadena SER	4 Dec 2002	1,000	26.9	42.8	1.7	28.6	15.9
Opina/Cadena SER	9 Oct 2002	1,000	30.0	44.6	0.4	25.0	14.6
Opina/El País	29 Sep 2002	?	26.4	44.1	1.7	27.8	17.7
Opina/Cadena SER	27 Aug 2002	1,000	21.8	42.5	2.2	33.5	20.7

=== Aznar vs. Zapatero ===
Polling firm/Commissioner	Fieldwork date	Sample size			Other/ None/ Not care	Question	Lead
Polling firm/Commissioner	Fieldwork date	Sample size	Aznar PP	Rodríguez Zapatero PSOE	Other/ None/ Not care	Question	Lead
Opina/Cadena SER	10 Sep 2003	?	39.1	35.9	4.6	20.4	3.2
Opina/Cadena SER	2 Sep 2003	1,000	38.5	38.1	5.7	17.7	0.4
Opina/Cadena SER	27 Aug 2003	1,000	36.2	40.0	6.0	17.8	3.8
Vox Pública/El Periódico	23–25 Jun 2003	1,502	39.3	43.7	17.0		4.4
Opina/Cadena SER	11 Jun 2003	?	37.4	40.8	5.2	16.6	3.4
Opina/Cadena SER	28 May 2003	?	36.8	42.4	2.9	17.9	5.6
Opina/Cadena SER	15 May 2003	?	35.1	39.7	4.2	21.0	4.6
Opina/Cadena SER	23 Apr 2003	?	29.5	41.9	3.6	25.0	12.4
Opina/Cadena SER	2 Apr 2003	?	26.9	49.8	4.0	19.3	22.9
Vox Pública/El Periódico	31 Mar–2 Apr 2003	1,503	28.7	54.0	17.3		25.3
Opina/Cadena SER	21 Mar 2003	?	26.6	43.5	4.4	25.5	16.9
Opina/Cadena SER	8 Mar 2003	?	26.0	47.6	4.2	22.2	21.6
Opina/Cadena SER	27 Jun 2002	1,000	32.6	38.3	4.6	24.5	5.7
Opina/Cadena SER	21 Jun 2002	?	29.5	35.3	6.6	28.6	5.8
Opina/Cadena SER	5 Jun 2002	1,000	33.1	33.4	3.0	30.5	0.3
Opina/Cadena SER	22 May 2002	1,000	29.8	39.3	2.8	28.1	9.5
Opina/Cadena SER	8 May 2002	1,000	36.1	35.3	3.1	25.5	0.8
Opina/Cadena SER	24 Apr 2002	1,000	35.2	34.5	4.4	28.9	0.7
Vox Pública/El Periódico	22–23 Oct 2001	1,509	40.3	41.4	18.3		1.1
Vox Pública/El Periódico	25–28 Jun 2001	1,506	38.1	43.3	18.6		5.2
Opina/Cadena SER	14 May 2001	1,000	36.4	33.5	7.7	22.4	2.9
Opina/Cadena SER	24 Apr 2001	1,000	32.1	34.1	5.4	28.4	2.0
Vox Pública/El Periódico	16–18 Apr 2001	1,514	37.6	40.3	22.1		2.7
Opina/Cadena SER	11 Apr 2001	?	32.2	34.9	4.1	28.8	2.7
Opina/Cadena SER	4 Apr 2001	?	31.9	35.9	5.0	27.1	4.0
Opina/Cadena SER	7 Mar 2001	?	34.6	36.4	3.5	25.5	2.2
Opina/Cadena SER	21 Feb 2001	1,000	31.9	37.5	4.6	26.0	5.6
Opina/Cadena SER	7 Feb 2001	?	31.9	34.0	6.3	27.8	2.1
Vox Pública/El Periódico	29–31 Jan 2001	1,519	37.7	42.7	19.6		5.0
Opina/Cadena SER	24 Jan 2001	?	30.5	34.3	5.8	29.4	3.8
Opina/Cadena SER	10 Jan 2001	?	30.5	37.3	5.0	27.2	6.8
Vox Pública/El Periódico	30–31 Oct 2000	1,210	40.6	38.6	20.8		2.0

== Predicted prime minister ==
The tables below list opinion polling on the perceived likelihood for each leader to become prime minister.

=== Rajoy vs. Zapatero ===
Polling firm/Commissioner	Fieldwork date	Sample size			Other/ None/ Not care	Question	Lead
Polling firm/Commissioner	Fieldwork date	Sample size	Rajoy PP	Rodríguez Zapatero PSOE	Other/ None/ Not care	Question	Lead
Opina/Cadena SER	7 Mar 2004	?	68.2	13.0	0.7	18.0	55.2
Opina/Cadena SER	6 Mar 2004	?	67.9	13.2	0.9	18.0	54.7
Opina/Cadena SER	5 Mar 2004	?	66.0	13.3	1.0	19.8	52.7
Opina/Cadena SER	4 Mar 2004	?	66.4	13.1	1.0	19.4	53.3
Opina/Cadena SER	3 Mar 2004	?	65.2	12.6	1.0	21.2	52.6
Vox Pública/El Periódico	1–3 Mar 2004	2,071	68.8	11.8	19.4		57.0
Noxa/La Vanguardia	27 Feb–3 Mar 2004	2,200	72.0	18.0	–	10.0	54.0
Opina/Cadena SER	2 Mar 2004	?	65.2	12.4	0.9	21.4	52.8
Opina/Cadena SER	1 Mar 2004	?	64.4	12.7	1.1	21.8	51.7
Opina/El País	27 Feb–1 Mar 2004	4,000	65.7	11.6	0.2	22.5	54.1
Opina/Cadena SER	29 Feb 2004	?	64.9	13.5	1.4	20.3	51.4
Opina/Cadena SER	28 Feb 2004	?	65.2	13.7	1.4	19.6	51.5
Opina/Cadena SER	27 Feb 2004	?	65.3	13.3	1.3	20.2	52.0
Opina/Cadena SER	26 Feb 2004	3,000	65.4	13.3	0.9	20.4	52.1
ASEP	16–21 Feb 2004	1,212	67.8	12.4	1.6	18.2	55.4
Noxa/La Vanguardia	6–12 Feb 2004	1,800	72.0	20.0	–	8.0	52.0
Opina/Cadena SER	11 Feb 2004	1,000	67.7	13.7	0.7	17.9	54.0
Opina/Cadena SER	31 Jan 2004	1,000	69.0	13.4	0.6	17.0	55.6
Opina/El País	25 Jan 2004	3,000	66.4	11.7	0.3	21.7	54.7
ASEP	19–24 Jan 2004	1,201	55.6	16.8	4.0	23.5	38.8
Vox Pública/El Periódico	19–21 Jan 2004	1,501	68.8	16.7	14.5		52.1
Opina/Cadena SER	16 Jan 2004	1,000	65.7	15.2	0.7	18.4	50.5
Noxa/La Vanguardia	7–9 Jan 2004	1,000	79.0	14.0	–	7.0	65.0
Opina/Cadena SER	2 Jan 2004	?	68.6	10.5	0.7	20.2	58.1
Opina/Cadena SER	19 Nov 2003	1,000	72.9	9.7	0.5	16.9	63.2
Opina/Cadena SER	24 Sep 2003	1,000	65.8	14.6	0.3	19.3	51.2
Opina/Cadena SER	10 Sep 2003	?	66.1	14.4	0.4	19.1	51.7
Opina/El País	7 Sep 2003	1,000	59.7	17.1	23.2		42.6
Opina/El País	25–26 Mar 2003	1,000	20.9	41.6	0.8	36.7	20.7
Opina/El País	3 Feb 2003	1,000	28.5	31.7	0.9	38.9	3.2
Opina/Cadena SER	4 Dec 2002	1,000	34.0	32.9	0.5	32.6	1.1
Opina/El País	23–24 Nov 2002	1,000	31.7	32.7	0.2	35.4	1.0
Opina/Cadena SER	9 Oct 2002	1,000	41.1	30.6	0.3	28.0	10.5
Opina/El País	29 Sep 2002	?	36.5	32.2	0.3	30.9	4.3
Opina/Cadena SER	27 Aug 2002	1,000	37.8	31.3	0.3	30.6	6.5
Opina/Cadena SER	27 Jun 2002	1,000	35.5	27.6	0.9	36.0	7.9
Opina/Cadena SER	8 May 2002	1,000	39.9	24.2	0.1	35.8	15.7

=== Mayor Oreja vs. Zapatero ===
Polling firm/Commissioner	Fieldwork date	Sample size			Other/ None/ Not care	Question	Lead
Polling firm/Commissioner	Fieldwork date	Sample size	Mayor Oreja PP	Rodríguez Zapatero PSOE	Other/ None/ Not care	Question	Lead
Opina/El País	25–26 Mar 2003	1,000	22.5	41.9	0.6	35.0	19.4
Opina/El País	3 Feb 2003	1,000	33.7	30.3	0.9	35.1	3.4
Opina/Cadena SER	4 Dec 2002	1,000	34.2	35.0	0.5	30.3	0.8
Opina/El País	23–24 Nov 2002	1,000	34.5	30.9	0.4	34.2	3.6
Opina/Cadena SER	9 Oct 2002	1,000	43.1	29.8	0.2	26.9	13.3
Opina/El País	29 Sep 2002	?	41.5	29.9	0.4	28.3	11.6
Opina/Cadena SER	27 Aug 2002	1,000	37.1	32.3	0.5	30.0	4.9
Opina/Cadena SER	27 Jun 2002	1,000	41.0	25.1	1.1	32.8	15.9
Opina/Cadena SER	8 May 2002	1,000	44.0	22.6	0.7	32.7	21.4

=== Rato vs. Zapatero ===
Polling firm/Commissioner	Fieldwork date	Sample size			Other/ None/ Not care	Question	Lead
Polling firm/Commissioner	Fieldwork date	Sample size	Rato PP	Rodríguez Zapatero PSOE	Other/ None/ Not care	Question	Lead
Opina/El País	25–26 Mar 2003	1,000	21.3	40.5	0.6	37.6	19.2
Opina/El País	3 Feb 2003	1,000	29.4	30.6	1.1	38.9	1.2
Opina/Cadena SER	4 Dec 2002	1,000	32.9	33.9	0.6	32.6	1.0
Opina/El País	23–24 Nov 2002	1,000	29.1	33.4	0.5	37.0	4.3
Opina/Cadena SER	9 Oct 2002	1,000	38.0	32.3	0.1	29.6	5.7
Opina/El País	29 Sep 2002	?	35.6	33.1	0.4	30.9	2.5
Opina/Cadena SER	27 Aug 2002	1,000	33.4	34.3	0.5	31.7	0.9
Opina/Cadena SER	27 Jun 2002	1,000	36.2	27.4	0.7	35.7	8.8
Opina/Cadena SER	8 May 2002	1,000	38.7	24.9	0.2	36.2	13.8

=== Gallardón vs. Zapatero ===
Polling firm/Commissioner	Fieldwork date	Sample size			Other/ None/ Not care	Question	Lead
Polling firm/Commissioner	Fieldwork date	Sample size	Ruiz- Gallardón PP	Rodríguez Zapatero PSOE	Other/ None/ Not care	Question	Lead
Opina/Cadena SER	4 Dec 2002	1,000	33.2	32.7	0.7	33.4	0.5
Opina/Cadena SER	9 Oct 2002	1,000	35.7	35.0	0.3	29.0	0.7
Opina/El País	29 Sep 2002	?	33.5	33.4	0.3	32.8	0.1
Opina/Cadena SER	27 Aug 2002	1,000	29.2	34.7	0.7	35.3	5.5

=== Acebes vs. Zapatero ===
Polling firm/Commissioner	Fieldwork date	Sample size			Other/ None/ Not care	Question	Lead
Polling firm/Commissioner	Fieldwork date	Sample size	Acebes PP	Rodríguez Zapatero PSOE	Other/ None/ Not care	Question	Lead
Opina/Cadena SER	4 Dec 2002	1,000	25.7	38.4	0.7	35.2	12.7
Opina/Cadena SER	9 Oct 2002	1,000	29.5	39.0	0.1	31.4	9.5
Opina/El País	29 Sep 2002	?	26.4	38.8	0.4	34.5	12.4
Opina/Cadena SER	27 Aug 2002	1,000	24.9	38.0	0.5	36.6	13.1

=== Aznar vs. Zapatero ===
Polling firm/Commissioner	Fieldwork date	Sample size			Other/ None/ Not care	Question	Lead
Polling firm/Commissioner	Fieldwork date	Sample size	Aznar PP	Rodríguez Zapatero PSOE	Other/ None/ Not care	Question	Lead
Opina/Cadena SER	10 Sep 2003	?	69.1	13.3	0.4	17.2	55.8
Opina/Cadena SER	2 Sep 2003	1,000	68.5	16.8	0.3	14.4	51.7
Opina/Cadena SER	27 Aug 2003	1,000	62.4	20.8	1.2	15.6	41.6
Opina/Cadena SER	11 Jun 2003	?	57.8	22.7	0.7	18.8	35.1
Opina/Cadena SER	28 May 2003	?	53.7	25.9	0.6	19.8	27.8
Opina/Cadena SER	15 May 2003	?	44.4	31.2	0.5	23.9	13.2
Opina/Cadena SER	23 Apr 2003	?	33.5	43.3	0.5	22.7	9.8
Opina/Cadena SER	2 Apr 2003	?	24.6	54.1	0.6	20.7	29.5
Opina/Cadena SER	21 Mar 2003	?	26.2	47.8	0.8	25.2	21.6
Opina/Cadena SER	8 Mar 2003	?	37.2	38.8	0.3	23.7	1.6
Opina/Cadena SER	27 Jun 2002	1,000	61.0	18.9	0.4	19.7	42.1
Opina/Cadena SER	21 Jun 2002	?	57.4	20.1	0.7	21.8	37.3
Opina/Cadena SER	5 Jun 2002	1,000	65.7	11.8	0.0	22.5	53.9
Opina/Cadena SER	22 May 2002	1,000	64.7	14.9	0.4	20.0	49.8
Opina/Cadena SER	8 May 2002	1,000	68.5	14.5	0.3	16.7	54.0
Opina/Cadena SER	24 Apr 2002	1,000	70.2	10.8	0.9	18.1	59.4
Opina/Cadena SER	14 May 2001	1,000	67.4	11.5	1.4	19.8	55.9
Opina/Cadena SER	24 Apr 2001	1,000	62.4	12.5	0.5	24.6	49.9
Opina/Cadena SER	11 Apr 2001	?	58.4	14.3	0.9	26.4	44.1
Opina/Cadena SER	4 Apr 2001	?	58.4	16.7	0.5	24.5	41.7
Opina/Cadena SER	7 Mar 2001	?	66.5	14.3	0.2	19.0	52.2
Opina/Cadena SER	21 Feb 2001	1,000	60.6	15.3	0.2	23.9	45.3
Opina/Cadena SER	7 Feb 2001	?	55.1	17.8	0.8	26.3	37.3
Opina/Cadena SER	24 Jan 2001	?	57.5	17.2	0.3	25.0	40.3
Opina/Cadena SER	10 Jan 2001	?	52.2	18.7	0.9	28.2	33.5

== Leader ratings ==
The table below lists opinion polling on leader ratings, on a 0–10 scale: 0 would stand for a "terrible" rating, whereas 10 would stand for "excellent".

Polling firm/Commissioner	Fieldwork date	Sample size						
Polling firm/Commissioner	Fieldwork date	Sample size	Aznar PP	Rajoy PP	Chaves PSOE	Zapatero PSOE	Frutos IU	Llamazares IU
Opina/Cadena SER	7 Mar 2004	?	4.76	4.99	–	5.30	–	3.89
Opina/Cadena SER	6 Mar 2004	?	4.82	5.03	–	5.28	–	3.86
Opina/Cadena SER	5 Mar 2004	?	4.79	5.01	–	5.23	–	3.87
Opina/Cadena SER	4 Mar 2004	?	4.83	5.07	–	5.15	–	3.80
Opina/Cadena SER	3 Mar 2004	?	4.88	5.07	–	5.12	–	3.76
Noxa/La Vanguardia	27 Feb–3 Mar 2004	2,200	–	5.6	–	5.5	–	4.2
Opina/Cadena SER	2 Mar 2004	?	4.85	5.08	–	5.03	–	3.65
Opina/Cadena SER	1 Mar 2004	?	4.80	4.99	–	5.01	–	3.68
Opina/El País	27 Feb–1 Mar 2004	4,000	–	5.03	–	4.85	–	3.60
Opina/Cadena SER	29 Feb 2004	?	4.75	5.00	–	4.99	–	3.69
Opina/Cadena SER	28 Feb 2004	?	4.78	5.00	–	5.07	–	3.78
Opina/Cadena SER	27 Feb 2004	?	4.86	5.08	–	5.08	–	3.77
Opina/Cadena SER	26 Feb 2004	3,000	4.86	5.05	–	5.12	–	3.78
CIS	24 Jan–15 Feb 2004	24,109	–	5.02	–	4.95	–	3.96
Noxa/La Vanguardia	6–12 Feb 2004	1,800	–	5.6	–	5.4	–	4.1
Opina/Cadena SER	11 Feb 2004	1,000	4.74	5.08	–	4.96	–	3.66
Opina/Cadena SER	31 Jan 2004	1,000	4.99	5.13	–	4.86	–	3.73
Opina/El País	25 Jan 2004	3,000	–	5.25	–	4.59	–	–
Opina/Cadena SER	16 Jan 2004	1,000	4.98	5.18	–	4.76	–	3.75
Noxa/La Vanguardia	7–9 Jan 2004	1,000	–	6.0	–	4.9	–	4.0
Opina/Cadena SER	2 Jan 2004	?	4.93	5.07	–	4.79	–	3.94
Opina/El País	7 Dec 2003	1,000	–	5.26	–	4.69	–	3.86
Opina/Cadena SER	19 Nov 2003	1,000	4.84	5.07	–	4.65	–	3.61
CIS	25–31 Oct 2003	2,488	4.56	4.63	–	4.47	–	3.55
Opina/Cadena SER	24 Sep 2003	1,000	4.81	5.02	–	4.75	–	3.55
Opina/Cadena SER	10 Sep 2003	1,000	4.96	–	–	4.68	–	3.51
Opina/El País	7 Sep 2003	1,000	–	5.50	–	4.93	–	–
Opina/Cadena SER	2 Sep 2003	1,000	5.07	–	–	4.70	–	3.62
Opina/Cadena SER	27 Aug 2003	1,000	4.78	–	–	4.54	–	3.60
CIS	2–8 Jul 2003	2,476	4.46	–	–	4.93	–	3.76
Opina/Cadena SER	1 Jul 2003	1,000	5.04	–	–	4.97	–	–
Opina/Cadena SER	11 Jun 2003	?	4.98	–	–	4.99	–	3.56
Opina/Cadena SER	28 May 2003	1,000	5.16	–	–	5.21	–	3.87
Opina/Cadena SER	15 May 2003	1,000	4.87	–	–	5.18	–	3.68
CIS	24–30 Apr 2003	2,494	3.99	–	–	4.81	–	3.77
Noxa/La Vanguardia	22–24 Apr 2003	1,000	5.1	–	–	5.2	–	3.8
Opina/Cadena SER	23 Apr 2003	1,000	4.39	–	–	4.95	–	3.73
Opina/Cadena SER	2 Apr 2003	?	3.80	–	–	5.10	–	3.77
Opina/El País	25–26 Mar 2003	1,000	3.68	–	–	4.93	–	3.87
Opina/Cadena SER	21 Mar 2003	1,000	3.90	–	–	5.15	–	3.92
Opina/Cadena SER	8 Mar 2003	1,000	4.18	–	–	5.29	–	3.86
Opina/Cadena SER	19 Feb 2003	1,000	4.59	–	–	5.37	–	4.10
Opina/Cadena SER	6 Feb 2003	?	4.65	–	–	5.22	–	3.72
Opina/El País	3 Feb 2003	1,000	4.79	–	–	4.98	–	3.88
CIS	21–26 Jan 2003	2,480	4.61	–	–	5.17	–	4.00
Opina/Cadena SER	22 Jan 2003	1,000	4.74	–	–	5.19	–	3.86
Opina/Cadena SER	8 Jan 2003	1,000	4.92	–	–	5.26	–	3.63
Opina/Cadena SER	17 Dec 2002	1,000	4.61	–	–	5.18	–	3.88
Opina/Cadena SER	4 Dec 2002	1,000	5.02	–	–	5.39	–	3.75
Opina/El País	23–24 Nov 2002	1,000	4.91	–	–	5.27	–	3.80
Opina/Cadena SER	20 Nov 2002	1,000	5.23	–	–	5.56	–	3.69
Opina/Cadena SER	6 Nov 2002	1,000	5.23	–	–	5.59	–	3.59
Opina/Cadena SER	23 Oct 2002	1,000	5.07	–	–	5.44	–	3.44
CIS	16–21 Oct 2002	2,489	4.75	–	–	5.26	–	3.55
Opina/Cadena SER	9 Oct 2002	1,000	5.19	–	–	5.46	–	3.59
Opina/El País	29 Sep 2002	?	5.14	–	–	5.28	–	3.66
Opina/Cadena SER	25 Sep 2002	1,000	5.18	–	–	5.28	–	3.63
Opina/Cadena SER	10 Sep 2002	1,000	4.89	–	–	5.32	–	3.71
Opina/Cadena SER	27 Aug 2002	1,000	4.99	–	–	5.42	–	3.66
CIS	16–21 Jul 2002	2,482	4.85	–	–	5.15	–	3.64
Opina/Cadena SER	27 Jun 2002	1,000	4.87	–	–	5.12	–	3.92
Opina/Cadena SER	21 Jun 2002	?	4.69	–	–	4.99	–	3.92
Opina/Cadena SER	5 Jun 2002	1,000	5.08	–	–	5.10	–	3.85
Opina/Cadena SER	22 May 2002	1,000	5.05	–	–	5.25	–	4.00
Opina/Cadena SER	8 May 2002	1,000	5.31	–	–	5.17	–	3.98
Opina/Cadena SER	24 Apr 2002	1,000	5.25	–	–	5.18	–	4.14
CIS	16–21 Apr 2002	2,498	5.11	–	–	5.03	–	3.88
Opina/Cadena SER	10 Apr 2002	1,000	5.20	–	–	5.03	–	4.12
Opina/Cadena SER	26 Mar 2002	1,000	5.17	–	–	5.22	–	3.89
Opina/Cadena SER	12 Mar 2002	1,000	5.18	–	–	5.11	–	3.97
Opina/Cadena SER	27 Feb 2002	1,000	5.24	–	–	5.09	–	3.90
Opina/Cadena SER	13 Feb 2002	1,000	5.34	–	–	5.17	–	3.83
CIS	27–31 Jan 2002	2,498	5.68	–	–	5.31	–	3.95
Opina/Cadena SER	30 Jan 2002	1,000	5.41	–	–	5.18	–	4.00
Opina/Cadena SER	16 Jan 2002	1,000	5.21	–	–	5.20	–	3.74
Opina/Cadena SER	3 Jan 2002	1,000	5.22	–	–	5.20	–	3.65
Opina/Cadena SER	5 Dec 2001	1,000	5.15	–	–	5.38	–	4.02
Opina/Cadena SER	20 Nov 2001	1,000	5.35	–	–	5.35	–	3.91
Opina/Cadena SER	7 Nov 2001	1,000	5.36	–	–	5.34	–	3.91
CIS	24–29 Oct 2001	2,499	5.07	–	–	5.23	–	3.90
Opina/Cadena SER	24 Oct 2001	1,000	5.46	–	–	5.49	–	3.80
Opina/Cadena SER	2 Oct 2001	?	5.28	–	–	5.56	–	3.80
Opina/Cadena SER	18 Sep 2001	1,000	5.50	–	–	5.78	–	3.95
Opina/Cadena SER	5 Sep 2001	1,000	5.42	–	–	5.70	–	4.20
CIS	13–18 Jul 2001	2,485	5.04	–	–	5.46	–	3.97
Opina/Cadena SER	30 Jun 2001	1,000	5.34	–	–	5.62	–	3.96
Opina/Cadena SER	13 Jun 2001	1,000	5.52	–	–	5.61	–	3.94
Opina/Cadena SER	30 May 2001	1,000	5.37	–	–	5.65	–	4.07
Opina/Cadena SER	14 May 2001	1,000	5.48	–	–	5.63	–	3.92
CIS	20–30 Apr 2001	2,492	5.22	–	–	5.38	–	3.83
Opina/Cadena SER	24 Apr 2001	?	5.38	–	–	5.66	–	3.95
Opina/Cadena SER	11 Apr 2001	?	5.58	–	–	5.76	–	3.89
Opina/Cadena SER	4 Apr 2001	?	5.48	–	–	5.80	–	4.06
Opina/Cadena SER	7 Mar 2001	?	5.44	–	–	5.81	–	4.24
Opina/Cadena SER	21 Feb 2001	1,000	5.36	–	–	5.67	–	4.13
Opina/Cadena SER	7 Feb 2001	?	5.35	–	–	5.72	–	3.88
Opina/Cadena SER	24 Jan 2001	?	5.45	–	–	5.82	–	4.05
CIS	18–23 Jan 2001	2,486	5.19	–	–	5.57	–	3.76
Opina/Cadena SER	16 Jan 2001	?	5.38	–	–	5.99	–	4.05
Opina/Cadena SER	20 Dec 2000	?	5.56	–	–	5.90	–	3.63
Opina/Cadena SER	5 Dec 2000	?	5.46	–	–	5.94	–	4.29
Opina/Cadena SER	22 Nov 2000	?	5.55	–	–	5.73	–	4.04
CIS	17–22 Oct 2000	2,497	5.44	–	–	5.57	4.23	–
CIS	13–18 Jul 2000	2,493	5.40	–	4.64	–	3.85	–
CIS	29 Apr–3 May 2000	2,491	5.78	–	4.78	–	4.12	–

== Approval ratings ==
The tables below list the public approval ratings of the leaders and leading candidates of the main political parties in Spain.

=== Mariano Rajoy ===
Polling firm/Commissioner	Fieldwork date	Sample size	Mariano Rajoy (PP)			
Polling firm/Commissioner	Fieldwork date	Sample size	check	X mark	Question	Net
Opina/Cadena SER	7 Mar 2004	?	39.4	46.5	14.1	−7.1
Opina/Cadena SER	6 Mar 2004	?	40.2	45.0	14.8	−4.8
Opina/Cadena SER	5 Mar 2004	?	40.0	45.1	14.9	−5.1
Opina/Cadena SER	4 Mar 2004	?	39.6	43.5	16.9	−3.9
Opina/Cadena SER	3 Mar 2004	?	40.2	42.5	17.3	−2.3
Opina/Cadena SER	2 Mar 2004	?	39.7	42.2	18.1	−2.5
Opina/Cadena SER	1 Mar 2004	?	38.7	44.0	17.2	−5.3
Opina/Cadena SER	29 Feb 2004	?	38.5	43.8	17.6	−5.3
Opina/Cadena SER	28 Feb 2004	?	38.5	43.0	18.6	−4.5
Opina/Cadena SER	27 Feb 2004	?	39.9	41.5	18.6	−1.6
Opina/Cadena SER	26 Feb 2004	3,000	39.8	41.7	18.4	−1.9
Gallup	2–20 Feb 2004	2,036	25.0	50.0	25.0	−25.0
Opina/Cadena SER	11 Feb 2004	1,000	43.4	39.4	17.2	+4.0
Opina/Cadena SER	31 Jan 2004	1,000	46.7	34.8	18.5	+11.9
Gallup	5–22 Jan 2004	2,028	25.0	46.0	29.0	−21.0
Opina/Cadena SER	16 Jan 2004	1,000	43.3	36.9	19.8	+6.4
Opina/Cadena SER	2 Jan 2004	?	44.1	33.9	22.0	+10.2
Gallup	1–19 Dec 2003	2,025	26.0	48.0	26.0	−22.0
Opina/El País	7 Dec 2003	1,000	48.1	35.1	16.8	+13.0
Gallup	4–25 Nov 2003	2,032	25.0	46.0	29.0	−21.0
Opina/Cadena SER	19 Nov 2003	1,000	45.3	32.1	22.6	+13.2
Gallup	3–22 Oct 2003	2,016	25.0	48.0	27.0	−23.0
Opina/Cadena SER	24 Sep 2003	1,000	43.3	33.0	23.7	+10.7

=== José María Aznar ===
Polling firm/Commissioner	Fieldwork date	Sample size	José María Aznar (PP)			
Polling firm/Commissioner	Fieldwork date	Sample size	check	X mark	Question	Net
Opina/Cadena SER	7 Mar 2004	?	43.2	49.5	7.3	−6.3
Opina/Cadena SER	6 Mar 2004	?	43.9	48.6	7.5	−4.7
Opina/Cadena SER	5 Mar 2004	?	44.0	48.9	7.1	−4.9
Opina/Cadena SER	4 Mar 2004	?	43.8	48.9	7.3	−5.1
Opina/Cadena SER	3 Mar 2004	?	44.5	48.2	7.3	−3.7
Opina/Cadena SER	2 Mar 2004	?	44.5	48.0	7.5	−3.5
Opina/Cadena SER	1 Mar 2004	?	45.2	48.1	6.7	−2.9
Opina/Cadena SER	29 Feb 2004	?	45.8	47.6	6.5	−1.8
Opina/Cadena SER	28 Feb 2004	?	46.2	47.2	6.7	−1.0
Opina/Cadena SER	27 Feb 2004	?	45.9	47.0	7.1	−1.1
Opina/Cadena SER	26 Feb 2004	3,000	44.5	47.6	7.8	−3.1
Gallup	2–20 Feb 2004	2,036	28.0	55.0	17.0	−27.0
Opina/Cadena SER	11 Feb 2004	1,000	41.0	50.1	8.9	−9.1
Opina/Cadena SER	31 Jan 2004	1,000	45.9	46.6	7.5	−0.7
Gallup	5–22 Jan 2004	2,028	30.0	51.0	19.0	−21.0
Opina/Cadena SER	16 Jan 2004	1,000	45.7	47.0	7.3	−1.3
Opina/Cadena SER	2 Jan 2004	?	43.9	48.6	7.5	−4.7
Gallup	1–19 Dec 2003	2,025	29.0	52.0	19.0	−23.0
Opina/El País	7 Dec 2003	1,000	41.2	50.5	8.3	−9.3
Gallup	4–25 Nov 2003	2,032	31.0	51.0	18.0	−20.0
Opina/Cadena SER	19 Nov 2003	1,000	44.4	45.7	9.9	−1.3
Gallup	3–22 Oct 2003	2,016	29.0	54.0	17.0	−25.0
Opina/Cadena SER	24 Sep 2003	1,000	44.6	50.6	4.8	−6.0
Gallup	1–24 Sep 2003	2,027	33.0	50.0	17.0	−17.0
Opina/Cadena SER	10 Sep 2003	1,000	44.5	47.3	8.2	−2.8
Opina/El País	7 Sep 2003	1,000	48.9	43.2	7.9	+5.7
Opina/Cadena SER	2 Sep 2003	1,000	46.1	46.4	7.5	−0.3
Opina/Cadena SER	27 Aug 2003	1,000	41.9	52.1	6.0	−10.2
Gallup	1–18 Aug 2003	2,026	30.0	52.0	18.0	−22.0
Gallup	1–24 Jul 2003	2,032	31.0	52.0	17.0	−21.0
Opina/Cadena SER	1 Jul 2003	1,000	46.8	48.2	5.0	−1.4
Gallup	2–20 Jun 2003	2,024	34.0	51.0	15.0	−17.0
Opina/Cadena SER	11 Jun 2003	?	46.4	45.4	8.4	+1.0
Opina/Cadena SER	28 May 2003	1,000	45.8	47.0	7.2	−1.2
Gallup	5–26 May 2003	2,026	26.0	58.0	16.0	−32.0
Opina/Cadena SER	15 May 2003	1,000	41.2	50.3	8.5	−9.1
Noxa/La Vanguardia	22–24 Apr 2003	1,000	42.0	53.0	5.0	−11.0
Opina/Cadena SER	23 Apr 2003	1,000	36.8	56.2	7.0	−19.4
Gallup	1–22 Apr 2003	2,020	21.0	61.0	18.0	−40.0
Opina/Cadena SER	2 Apr 2003	?	28.3	67.1	4.6	−38.8
Opina/El País	25–26 Mar 2003	1,000	30.8	62.8	6.4	−32.0
Gallup	3–25 Mar 2003	2,016	25.0	60.0	15.0	−35.0
Opina/Cadena SER	21 Mar 2003	1,000	30.8	62.6	6.6	−31.8
Opina/Cadena SER	8 Mar 2003	1,000	31.1	61.6	7.3	−30.5
Gallup	3–24 Feb 2003	2,028	26.0	57.0	17.0	−31.0
Opina/Cadena SER	19 Feb 2003	1,000	33.7	54.5	11.8	−20.8
Opina/Cadena SER	6 Feb 2003	?	34.9	53.4	11.7	−18.5
Opina/El País	3 Feb 2003	1,000	40.5	47.5	12.0	−7.0
Gallup	7–23 Jan 2003	2,034	27.0	56.0	17.0	−29.0
Opina/Cadena SER	22 Jan 2003	1,000	39.8	50.2	10.0	−10.4
Opina/Cadena SER	8 Jan 2003	1,000	42.8	47.7	9.5	−4.9
Gallup	2–23 Dec 2002	2,011	28.0	53.0	19.0	−25.0
Opina/Cadena SER	17 Dec 2002	1,000	38.7	52.1	9.2	−13.4
Opina/Cadena SER	4 Dec 2002	1,000	47.1	45.2	7.7	+1.9
Gallup	4–25 Nov 2002	2,018	31.0	50.0	19.0	−19.0
Opina/El País	23–24 Nov 2002	1,000	45.4	44.8	9.8	+0.6
Opina/Cadena SER	20 Nov 2002	1,000	49.5	41.9	8.6	+7.6
Opina/Cadena SER	6 Nov 2002	1,000	47.0	44.7	8.3	+2.3
Gallup	1–24 Oct 2002	2,018	32.0	48.0	20.0	−16.0
Opina/Cadena SER	23 Oct 2002	1,000	46.2	46.1	7.7	+0.1
Opina/Cadena SER	9 Oct 2002	1,000	52.9	40.9	6.2	+12.0
Opina/El País	29 Sep 2002	?	52.0	42.0	6.0	+10.0
Opina/Cadena SER	25 Sep 2002	1,000	51.8	41.5	6.7	+10.3
Opina/Cadena SER	10 Sep 2002	1,000	46.3	43.6	10.1	+2.7
Opina/Cadena SER	27 Aug 2002	1,000	49.3	44.6	6.1	+4.7
Gallup	1–23 Aug 2002	2,008	31.0	49.0	20.0	−18.0
Gallup	2–29 Jul 2002	2,013	32.0	50.0	18.0	−18.0
Opina/Cadena SER	27 Jun 2002	1,000	44.6	46.6	8.8	−2.0
Gallup	1–24 Jun 2002	2,016	36.0	47.0	17.0	−11.0
Opina/Cadena SER	21 Jun 2002	?	40.2	50.7	9.1	−10.5
Opina/Cadena SER	5 Jun 2002	1,000	45.8	44.5	9.7	+1.3
Opina/Cadena SER	22 May 2002	1,000	47.0	42.1	10.9	+4.9
Gallup	3–22 May 2002	2,010	38.0	42.0	20.0	−4.0
Opina/Cadena SER	8 May 2002	1,000	53.3	38.4	8.3	+14.9
Opina/Cadena SER	24 Apr 2002	1,000	52.2	37.2	10.6	+15.0
Gallup	1–23 Apr 2002	2,017	36.0	43.0	21.0	−7.0
Opina/Cadena SER	10 Apr 2002	1,000	51.0	39.5	9.5	+11.5
Gallup	4–27 Mar 2002	2,029	35.0	45.0	20.0	−10.0
Opina/Cadena SER	26 Mar 2002	1,000	52.4	40.5	7.1	+11.9
Opina/Cadena SER	12 Mar 2002	1,000	50.9	37.5	11.6	+13.4
Opina/Cadena SER	27 Feb 2002	1,000	52.5	37.3	10.2	+15.2
Gallup	4–27 Feb 2002	2,030	39.0	43.0	18.0	−4.0
Opina/Cadena SER	13 Feb 2002	1,000	53.9	34.7	11.4	+19.2
Opina/Cadena SER	30 Jan 2002	1,000	54.5	34.0	11.5	+20.5
Gallup	4–29 Jan 2002	2,031	41.0	42.0	17.0	−1.0
Opina/Cadena SER	16 Jan 2002	1,000	50.4	38.3	11.3	+12.1
Opina/Cadena SER	3 Jan 2002	1,000	50.7	37.0	12.3	+13.7
Gallup	3–28 Dec 2001	2,020	35.0	46.0	19.0	−11.0
Opina/Cadena SER	5 Dec 2001	1,000	46.8	40.3	12.9	+6.5
Gallup	2–28 Nov 2001	2,021	37.0	41.0	22.0	−4.0
Opina/Cadena SER	20 Nov 2001	1,000	51.9	37.0	11.1	+14.9
Opina/Cadena SER	7 Nov 2001	1,000	53.0	35.4	11.6	+17.6
Gallup	1–30 Oct 2001	2,016	37.0	41.0	22.0	−4.0
Opina/Cadena SER	24 Oct 2001	1,000	53.2	34.5	12.3	+18.7
Opina/Cadena SER	2 Oct 2001	?	52.1	35.8	12.1	+16.3
Gallup	6–27 Sep 2001	2,027	40.0	39.0	21.0	+1.0
Opina/Cadena SER	18 Sep 2001	1,000	54.0	30.3	15.7	+23.7
Opina/Cadena SER	5 Sep 2001	1,000	50.9	39.5	9.6	+11.4
Gallup	2–30 Jul 2001	2,024	37.0	45.0	18.0	−8.0
Opina/Cadena SER	30 Jun 2001	1,000	51.6	33.9	14.5	+17.7
Gallup	6–27 Jun 2001	2,008	39.0	43.0	18.0	−4.0
Opina/Cadena SER	13 Jun 2001	1,000	57.0	31.1	11.9	+25.9
Opina/Cadena SER	30 May 2001	1,000	53.4	36.6	10.0	+16.8
Gallup	4–25 May 2001	2,031	39.0	38.0	23.0	+1.0
Opina/Cadena SER	14 May 2001	1,000	56.2	35.2	8.6	+21.0
Gallup	4–25 Apr 2001	2,026	37.0	41.0	22.0	−4.0
Opina/Cadena SER	24 Apr 2001	?	52.1	36.5	11.4	+15.6
Opina/Cadena SER	11 Apr 2001	?	52.9	32.7	14.4	+20.2
Opina/Cadena SER	4 Apr 2001	?	52.8	35.4	11.8	+17.4
Gallup	5–30 Mar 2001	2,026	37.0	39.0	24.0	−2.0
Opina/Cadena SER	7 Mar 2001	?	51.7	38.1	10.2	+13.6
Gallup	1–26 Feb 2001	2,036	38.0	40.0	22.0	−2.0
Opina/Cadena SER	7 Feb 2001	?	51.8	37.1	11.1	+14.7
Gallup	8–27 Jan 2001	2,028	41.0	39.0	20.0	+2.0
Opina/Cadena SER	24 Jan 2001	?	48.9	37.9	13.2	+11.0
Opina/Cadena SER	16 Jan 2001	?	52.2	36.0	11.8	+16.2
Gallup	7–24 Dec 2000	?	43.0	39.0	18.0	+4.0
Opina/Cadena SER	20 Dec 2000	?	53.9	34.5	11.6	+19.4
Opina/Cadena SER	5 Dec 2000	?	52.4	35.4	12.2	+17.0
Opina/Cadena SER	22 Nov 2000	?	54.7	33.0	12.3	+21.7
Opina/Cadena SER	8 Nov 2000	?	54.3	32.8	12.9	+21.5
Gallup	1–27 Sep 2000	2,025	43.0	35.0	22.0	+8.0

=== José Luis Rodríguez Zapatero ===
Polling firm/Commissioner	Fieldwork date	Sample size	José Luis Rodríguez Zapatero (PSOE)			
Polling firm/Commissioner	Fieldwork date	Sample size	check	X mark	Question	Net
Opina/Cadena SER	7 Mar 2004	?	41.0	48.3	10.7	−7.3
Opina/Cadena SER	6 Mar 2004	?	40.1	48.4	11.8	−8.3
Opina/Cadena SER	5 Mar 2004	?	40.1	48.1	11.8	−8.0
Opina/Cadena SER	4 Mar 2004	?	38.0	48.9	13.1	−10.9
Opina/Cadena SER	3 Mar 2004	?	37.4	50.2	12.4	−12.8
Opina/Cadena SER	2 Mar 2004	?	35.8	51.9	12.3	−16.1
Opina/Cadena SER	1 Mar 2004	?	34.7	52.8	12.4	−18.1
Opina/Cadena SER	29 Feb 2004	?	34.4	52.1	13.5	−17.7
Opina/Cadena SER	28 Feb 2004	?	35.5	51.5	12.9	−16.0
Opina/Cadena SER	27 Feb 2004	?	37.2	51.3	11.5	−14.1
Opina/Cadena SER	26 Feb 2004	3,000	37.2	51.1	11.7	−13.9
Gallup	2–20 Feb 2004	2,036	30.0	47.0	23.0	−17.0
Opina/Cadena SER	11 Feb 2004	1,000	39.1	50.9	10.0	−11.8
Opina/Cadena SER	31 Jan 2004	1,000	37.7	51.6	10.7	−13.9
Gallup	5–22 Jan 2004	2,028	27.0	48.0	25.0	−21.0
Opina/Cadena SER	16 Jan 2004	1,000	33.8	54.1	12.1	−20.3
Opina/Cadena SER	2 Jan 2004	?	32.6	58.0	9.4	−25.4
Gallup	1–19 Dec 2003	2,025	25.0	50.0	25.0	−25.0
Opina/El País	7 Dec 2003	1,000	39.0	51.8	9.2	−12.8
Gallup	4–25 Nov 2003	2,032	26.0	48.0	26.0	−22.0
Opina/Cadena SER	19 Nov 2003	1,000	32.8	55.5	11.7	−22.7
Gallup	3–22 Oct 2003	2,016	26.0	50.0	24.0	−24.0
Opina/Cadena SER	24 Sep 2003	1,000	37.2	54.4	8.4	−17.2
Gallup	1–24 Sep 2003	2,027	27.0	51.0	22.0	−24.0
Opina/Cadena SER	10 Sep 2003	1,000	36.9	54.1	9.0	−17.2
Opina/El País	7 Sep 2003	1,000	37.6	52.7	9.7	−15.1
Opina/Cadena SER	2 Sep 2003	1,000	36.6	53.1	10.3	−16.5
Opina/Cadena SER	27 Aug 2003	1,000	33.0	59.5	7.5	−26.5
Gallup	1–18 Aug 2003	2,026	25.0	50.0	25.0	−25.0
Gallup	1–24 Jul 2003	2,032	28.0	49.0	23.0	−21.0
Opina/Cadena SER	1 Jul 2003	1,000	42.6	50.0	7.4	−7.4
Gallup	2–20 Jun 2003	2,024	29.0	49.0	22.0	−20.0
Opina/Cadena SER	11 Jun 2003	?	42.9	46.5	10.6	−3.6
Opina/Cadena SER	28 May 2003	1,000	45.4	44.2	10.4	+1.2
Gallup	5–26 May 2003	2,026	33.0	44.0	23.0	−11.0
Opina/Cadena SER	15 May 2003	1,000	44.3	43.2	12.5	+1.1
Opina/Cadena SER	23 Apr 2003	1,000	40.0	48.4	11.6	−8.4
Gallup	1–22 Apr 2003	2,020	34.0	42.0	24.0	−8.0
Opina/Cadena SER	2 Apr 2003	?	44.9	44.1	11.0	+0.8
Opina/El País	25–26 Mar 2003	1,000	41.6	45.6	12.8	−4.0
Gallup	3–25 Mar 2003	2,016	36.0	43.0	21.0	−7.0
Opina/Cadena SER	21 Mar 2003	1,000	44.6	42.5	12.9	+2.1
Opina/Cadena SER	8 Mar 2003	1,000	50.1	38.2	11.7	+11.9
Gallup	3–24 Feb 2003	2,028	35.0	41.0	24.0	−6.0
Opina/Cadena SER	19 Feb 2003	1,000	46.6	38.8	14.6	+7.8
Opina/Cadena SER	6 Feb 2003	?	47.7	36.0	16.3	+11.7
Opina/El País	3 Feb 2003	1,000	45.9	38.6	15.5	+7.3
Gallup	7–23 Jan 2003	2,034	34.0	41.0	25.0	−7.0
Opina/Cadena SER	22 Jan 2003	1,000	46.6	38.3	15.1	+8.3
Opina/Cadena SER	8 Jan 2003	1,000	46.9	39.4	13.7	+7.5
Gallup	2–23 Dec 2002	2,011	32.0	41.0	27.0	−9.0
Opina/Cadena SER	17 Dec 2002	1,000	47.0	38.4	14.3	+8.6
Opina/Cadena SER	4 Dec 2002	1,000	54.7	34.4	10.9	+20.3
Gallup	4–25 Nov 2002	2,018	36.0	36.0	28.0	±0.0
Opina/El País	23–24 Nov 2002	1,000	51.2	34.3	14.5	+16.9
Opina/Cadena SER	20 Nov 2002	1,000	55.4	31.0	13.6	+24.4
Opina/Cadena SER	6 Nov 2002	1,000	57.7	28.6	13.7	+29.1
Gallup	1–24 Oct 2002	2,018	35.0	36.0	29.0	−1.0
Opina/Cadena SER	23 Oct 2002	1,000	54.1	32.3	13.6	+21.8
Opina/Cadena SER	9 Oct 2002	1,000	55.6	33.7	10.7	+21.9
Opina/El País	29 Sep 2002	?	53.0	35.7	11.4	+17.3
Opina/Cadena SER	25 Sep 2002	1,000	55.0	33.9	11.1	+21.1
Opina/Cadena SER	10 Sep 2002	1,000	51.1	32.5	16.4	+18.6
Opina/Cadena SER	27 Aug 2002	1,000	56.1	33.1	10.8	+23.0
Gallup	1–23 Aug 2002	2,008	31.0	40.0	29.0	−9.0
Gallup	2–29 Jul 2002	2,013	31.0	41.0	28.0	−10.0
Opina/Cadena SER	27 Jun 2002	1,000	46.7	40.3	12.7	+6.4
Gallup	1–24 Jun 2002	2,016	30.0	42.0	28.0	−12.0
Opina/Cadena SER	21 Jun 2002	?	44.5	42.4	13.1	+2.1
Opina/Cadena SER	5 Jun 2002	1,000	43.1	39.4	17.5	+3.7
Opina/Cadena SER	22 May 2002	1,000	45.3	39.6	15.1	+5.7
Gallup	3–22 May 2002	2,010	33.0	38.0	29.0	−5.0
Opina/Cadena SER	8 May 2002	1,000	48.0	37.0	15.0	+11.0
Opina/Cadena SER	24 Apr 2002	1,000	46.6	37.6	15.8	+9.0
Gallup	1–23 Apr 2002	2,017	33.0	39.0	28.0	−6.0
Opina/Cadena SER	10 Apr 2002	1,000	43.6	40.5	15.9	+3.1
Gallup	4–27 Mar 2002	2,029	34.0	39.0	27.0	−5.0
Opina/Cadena SER	26 Mar 2002	1,000	49.7	37.8	12.5	+11.9
Opina/Cadena SER	12 Mar 2002	1,000	44.9	38.6	16.5	+6.3
Opina/Cadena SER	27 Feb 2002	1,000	45.3	36.7	18.0	+8.6
Gallup	4–27 Feb 2002	2,030	36.0	35.0	29.0	+1.0
Opina/Cadena SER	13 Feb 2002	1,000	45.1	35.4	19.5	+9.7
Opina/Cadena SER	30 Jan 2002	1,000	44.3	35.2	20.5	+9.1
Gallup	4–29 Jan 2002	2,031	33.0	40.0	27.0	−7.0
Opina/Cadena SER	16 Jan 2002	1,000	45.3	34.7	20.0	+10.6
Opina/Cadena SER	3 Jan 2002	1,000	48.0	29.9	22.1	+18.1
Gallup	3–28 Dec 2001	2,020	36.0	37.0	27.0	−1.0
Opina/Cadena SER	5 Dec 2001	1,000	45.4	32.5	22.1	+12.9
Gallup	2–28 Nov 2001	2,021	33.0	36.0	31.0	−3.0
Opina/Cadena SER	20 Nov 2001	1,000	48.0	31.4	20.6	+16.6
Opina/Cadena SER	7 Nov 2001	1,000	49.6	31.1	19.3	+18.5
Gallup	1–30 Oct 2001	2,016	34.0	34.0	32.0	±0.0
Opina/Cadena SER	24 Oct 2001	1,000	49.2	29.1	21.7	+20.1
Opina/Cadena SER	2 Oct 2001	?	53.4	25.1	21.5	+28.3
Gallup	6–27 Sep 2001	2,027	37.0	31.0	32.0	+6.0
Opina/Cadena SER	18 Sep 2001	1,000	57.3	18.7	24.0	+38.6
Opina/Cadena SER	5 Sep 2001	1,000	58.3	24.9	16.8	+33.4
Gallup	2–30 Jul 2001	2,024	39.0	33.0	28.0	+6.0
Opina/Cadena SER	30 Jun 2001	1,000	53.5	25.7	20.8	+27.8
Gallup	6–27 Jun 2001	2,008	36.0	34.0	30.0	+2.0
Opina/Cadena SER	13 Jun 2001	1,000	53.5	23.5	23.0	+30.0
Opina/Cadena SER	30 May 2001	1,000	57.8	22.4	19.8	+35.4
Gallup	4–25 May 2001	2,031	35.0	30.0	35.0	+5.0
Opina/Cadena SER	14 May 2001	1,000	57.1	27.4	15.5	+29.7
Gallup	4–25 Apr 2001	2,026	37.0	28.0	35.0	+9.0
Opina/Cadena SER	24 Apr 2001	?	54.1	23.8	22.1	+30.3
Opina/Cadena SER	11 Apr 2001	?	57.1	20.2	22.7	+36.9
Opina/Cadena SER	4 Apr 2001	?	55.2	16.5	28.2	+38.7
Gallup	5–30 Mar 2001	2,026	35.0	28.0	37.0	+7.0
Opina/Cadena SER	7 Mar 2001	?	59.7	21.2	19.1	+38.5
Gallup	1–26 Feb 2001	2,036	35.0	29.0	36.0	+6.0
Opina/Cadena SER	21 Feb 2001	1,000	55.9	23.9	20.2	+32.0
Opina/Cadena SER	7 Feb 2001	?	55.5	21.3	23.2	+34.2
Gallup	8–27 Jan 2001	2,028	40.0	22.0	38.0	+18.0
Opina/Cadena SER	24 Jan 2001	?	57.2	18.2	24.6	+39.0
Opina/Cadena SER	16 Jan 2001	?	63.1	11.3	25.6	+51.8
Gallup	7–24 Dec 2000	?	40.0	22.0	38.0	+18.0
Opina/Cadena SER	20 Dec 2000	?	60.1	14.8	25.1	+45.3
Opina/Cadena SER	5 Dec 2000	?	57.2	16.1	26.7	+41.1
Opina/Cadena SER	22 Nov 2000	?	51.9	16.0	32.1	+35.9
Gallup	1–27 Sep 2000	2,025	30.0	22.0	48.0	+8.0
