= Rato (surname) =

Rato is the surname of the following people:

- Bruno Rato (born 1986), Brazilian football forward
- Clayson Rato (born 1978), Brazilian football player
- Flávio Caça-Rato (born 1986), Brazilian football forward
- Khyongla Rato (1923–2022), Tibetan Buddhist monk
- Rafael Rato (born 1983), Brazilian futsal player
- Ramón Rato (1907–1998), Spanish businessman
- Rita Rato (born 1983), Portuguese politician
- Rodrigo Rato (born 1949), Spanish banker and politician
- Wellington Rato (born 1992), Brazilian football midfielder
- Wiremu Te Koti Te Rato (1820–1895), New Zealand wesleyan minister
