= Ratomir =

Ratomir (Serbian Cyrillic: Ратомир) is a Serbian masculine given name that may refer to the following notable people:

- Ratomir Čabrić (1918–1990), Serbian football player and coach
- Ratomir Damjanović (born 1945), Serbian radio journalist, writer and reciter
- Ratomir Dugonjić (1916–1987), Yugoslav Partisan fighter
- Ratomir Dujković (born 1946), Serbian football manager and player
- Ratomir Tvrdić (born 1943), Croatian basketball player
- Ratomir Vićentić (1939–2009), Serbian basketball player
