= Ramón Rato =

Ramón Rato (1907–1998) was a Spanish businessman who in 1947 set up the "Cadena Rato" radio station which became one of the most popular in Spain during the Francoist State, of whom Rato was a supporter, though he was equally supportive of King Juan Carlos after Franco's death and the restoration of the monarchy.

In 1967 he was imprisoned for 3 years and fined 176 million pesetas for having money hidden in Switzerland. On 2 April he sold 63 of the 72 radio stations he owned to the ONCE (National Blind Association), for five billion pesetas. He died in September 1998 at the age of 91.

He is the father of Rodrigo Rato, former Minister for Economic Affairs and former director of the International Monetary Fund.
