= Rodrigo Rato =

Spanish politician & banker (born 1949)

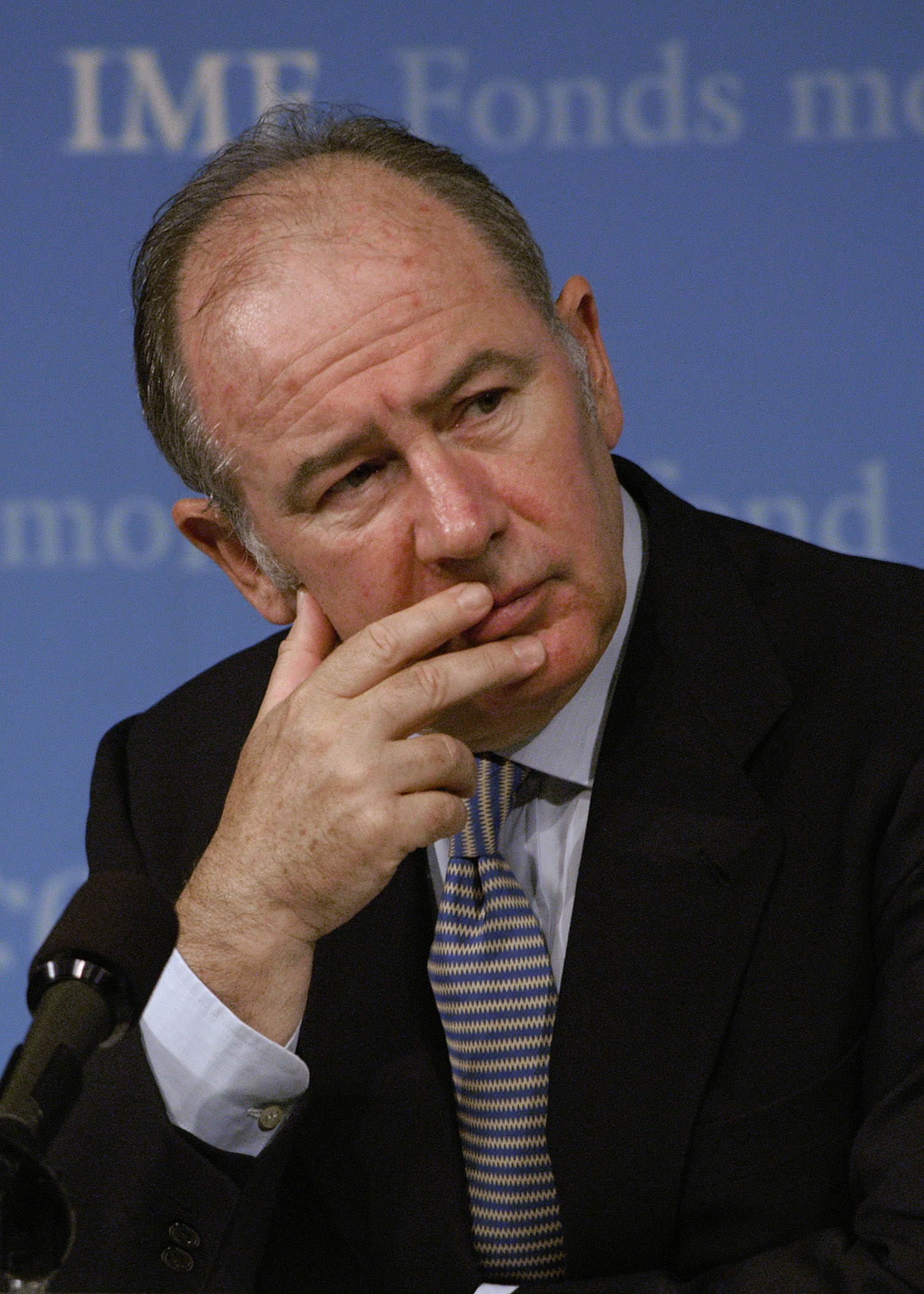
- Rato in 2004

Managing Director of the International Monetary Fund
- In office 7 June 2004 – 1 November 2007
- Preceded by: Horst Köhler
- Succeeded by: Dominique Strauss-Kahn

First Deputy Prime Minister of Spain
- In office 3 September 2003 – 17 April 2004
- Prime Minister: José María Aznar
- Preceded by: Mariano Rajoy
- Succeeded by: María Teresa Fernández de la Vega

Minister of Economy of Spain
- In office 27 April 2000 – 17 April 2004
- Prime Minister: José María Aznar
- Preceded by: Position established
- Succeeded by: Pedro Solbes

Second Deputy Prime Minister of Spain
- In office 6 May 1996 – 4 September 2003
- Prime Minister: José María Aznar
- Preceded by: Juan Antonio García Díez
- Succeeded by: Javier Arenas

Minister of Economy and Finance of Spain
- In office 5 May 1996 – 27 April 2000
- Prime Minister: José María Aznar
- Preceded by: Pedro Solbes
- Succeeded by: Cristóbal Montoro (Finance)

Member of the Congress of Deputies
- In office 21 November 1989 – 12 May 2004
- Constituency: Madrid
- In office 28 October 1982 – 21 November 1989
- Constituency: Cádiz

Personal details
- Born: Rodrigo de Rato y Figaredo; 18 March 1949 (age 77) Madrid, Spain
- Party: People's Party
- Spouse: Alicia Gonzalez (m. 2015)
- Children: 3
- Relatives: Ramón Rato (Father)
- Education: Complutense University; University of California, Berkeley

Rodrigo de Rato y Figaredo (born 18 March 1949) is a businessman and politician who served in the Council of Ministers of Spain from 1996 to 2004. He also served as the ninth managing director of the International Monetary Fund (IMF) from 2004 to 2007 and the president of Bankia from 2010 to 2012.

Rato was arrested on 16 April 2015 for alleged fraud, embezzlement and money laundering. His case was still awaiting trial a year later when his name appeared in the Panama Papers. Despite his prior assurances that he did not own companies in tax havens, apparently he used two offshore companies to avoid taxes on millions of euros kept overseas. It was alleged that he owed taxes to both the Spanish and Panamanian governments.

On 23 February 2017, Rato was found guilty of embezzlement of about 100,000 euros from Bankia, the bank where he worked, in the case of the so-called "black cards". He was sentenced to 4½ years' imprisonment. In September 2018, the sentence was confirmed by the Supreme Court of Spain, and Rato entered prison on 25 October 2018.

== Early life and education ==
Rodrigo de Rato was born in Madrid, into a rich textile-owning family from Asturias. He is the great-grandson of politician Faustino Rodríguez-San Pedro y Díaz-Argüelles and the son of businessman Ramón Rato who was jailed in 1967 for tax evasion to Switzerland through his Banco Siero, and of Aurora Figaredo Sela. Both the Rato and the Figaredo sides of his family owned industries and nobility titles. Rato attended a Jesuit school Our Lady of Remembrance College, Madrid before studying law in the Complutense University.

In 1971 Rato went to University of California, Berkeley, and received an MBA in 1974 from the Haas School of Business.

== Career ==
=== Early beginnings ===
In 1975 Rato became involved in the family business, first in Fuensanta, an Asturian mineral water company, and then in two Madrid construction firms. He also became involved in expanding the Cadena Rato chain of radio stations.

In 1977 Rato joined the newly formed Popular Alliance (AP), a party containing former ministers of Franco, founded by Manuel Fraga, a close personal friend of his father. In December 1979 Rato was elected to the national executive committee, and became secretary of the AP economic commission. In February 1981 he became one of the party's five Secretaries-General, and was considered to be their economic expert. He supported tight controls on public spending, and an emphasis on the supply side of economics. In October 1982 he won election as an AP member of the Congress of Deputies for Cádiz in spite of having no connection to this Andalucian town. He represented the area until 1989 and subsequently represented Madrid from 1989 to 2000.

The 1982 election handed a loss to the AP, and marked the beginning of the long rule of the PSOE and Felipe González. Until 1984 Rato was the Secretary of the parliamentary group. He then became their economic affairs spokesman where he impressed the party with his attacks on the PSOE's economic policies. He was seen to be on the liberal wing of the party.

When Fraga resigned from the leadership in December 1986 Rato backed Miguel Herrero y Rodríguez de Miñón who lost the leadership race to Antonio Hernández Mancha, but managed to keep his positions within the party. During these years he also continued his business career in Aguas de Fuensanta; having previously been the CEO of the company from 1978 to 1982, he served as chairman from 1985 to 1991. In June 1989 Fraga again became interim President after the generally acknowledged failure of the leadership of Hernández Mancha. The party became the slightly more inclusive People's Party (PP). Rato was given shared responsibility over the elections with Francisco Álvarez-Cascos Fernández, the new party Secretary General. He was a close supporter of José María Aznar, who was voted as the new PP leader on 4 September.

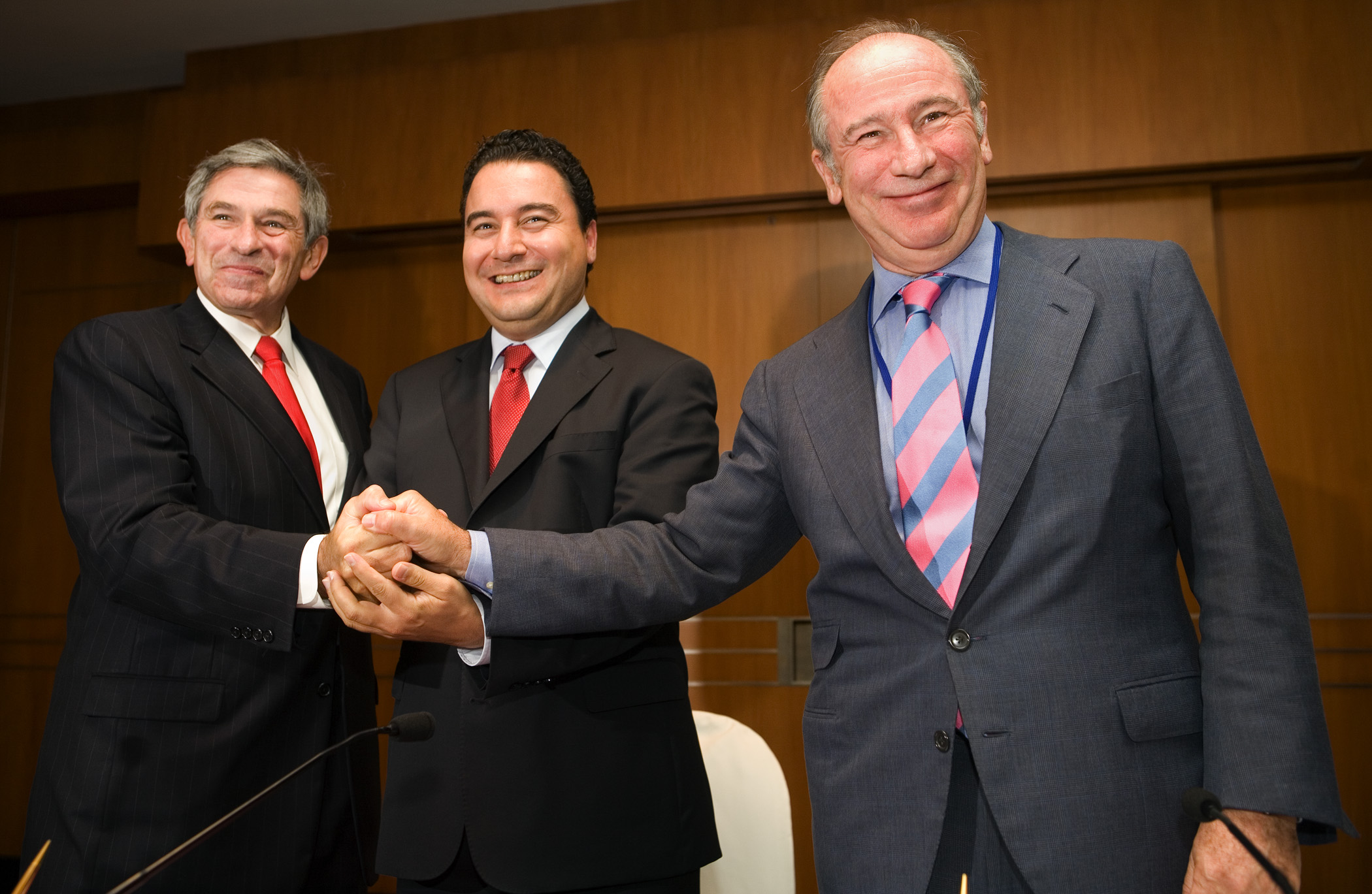
Rodrigo de Rato (R), Turkey's Minister of Economy Ali Babacan (C), and World Bank President Paul Wolfowitz (L) shake hands after signing the memorandum of understanding for the 2009 IMF-World Bank Annual Meetings to be held in Turkey.

On 29 October, the PP lost the general election, though his role in the campaign gave him national prominence. Afterwards he was appointed party spokesman. On 2 April 1990 his father sold the family stake in Cadena Rato for 5 billion pesetas. In June 1991 he stopped being President of Fuensanta, but remained on the board until 1993. On 6 June that year the PP lost another general election to PSOE. In the 12th National Congress in January 1996 he was confirmed as one of the three vice secretaries of the party.

=== Minister of Economy and vice president ===
Then on 3 March 1996 the PP won the general election. On 4 May Aznar became Prime Minister of Spain, and on 6 May Rato became both second Vice President and Minister of Economy and Finance. On 12 March 2000 the PP won again, this time with an absolute majority. His ministries were reorganised, and he gave all his responsibilities to Cristóbal Montoro Romero who became Minister of Finance. In his second term he had to fend off various charges of incompatibility between his public office and his private business interests.

=== Managing Director of the IMF ===
Rato became the managing director of the IMF on 7 June 2004, taking over from Anne Krueger, who had been acting as temporary managing director after Horst Köhler, who at that time was nominated (and later elected) President of Germany, resigned the post 4 March 2004.

In June 2007 Rato announced that he would resign from his post the following October, citing personal reasons. On 28 September 2007, the International Monetary Fund's 24 executive directors elected former French Minister for Economics, Finance, and Industry, Dominique Strauss-Kahn, over former Czech Prime Minister Josef Tošovský, to be the new managing director in succession to Rato.

== Career in the private sector ==
=== Bankia ===
Rato assumed the presidency of Caja Madrid in 2010, a public savings bank based in the Community of Madrid, and after a merger with other six saving banks he assumed the presidency of the new group now called Bankia. On 7 May 2012, he resigned amid growing concerns about the solvency of the bank. Although the core capital ratio was 10,4%, the Popular Party Government planned to lend about 8 billion euro to the bank to increase its solvency, as was done before throughout Europe (e.g. ING and Northern Rock crisis). Due to his political ties to the governing PP, which decided to inject the funds, Rato resigned. He had his salary cut from €2.3 million to €600,000 annually in 2011 due to new laws for rescued banks.

=== Other activities ===
- International Airlines Group (IAG), Member of the Board of Directors
- Mapfre, Member of the Board of Directors (2010–2012)

== Arrest and conviction ==
On 4 July 2012, Rato, along with 30 other former members of the board of directors of Bankia, were charged with accounting irregularities. Bloomberg Businessweek listed Rato as the worst CEO in 2012. In 2011, Bankia had announced profits of €309 million; after Rato resigned, the figure was amended to €3 billion in losses. In October 2014, it became known that between 24 October 2010 to 28 November 2011, Rato made 519 purchases with a secret corporate credit card, spending a total of €99,041. Among these purchases he spent in one day were €3,547 in alcoholic beverages and €1,000 in shoes, along with 16 cash withdrawals of more than €1,000, most of them during the last months of his presidential term.

After a hearing 17 October 2014, the Spanish High Court judge Fernando Andreu assigned civil responsibility for the credit card abuse to Rodrigo Rato and Miguel Blesa. Rato was ordered to pay a bond of €3 million, and was expelled from the People's Party (PP).

The case went to court in 2016. On 23 February 2017, Rato was convicted and sentenced to four and a half years in prison. In September 2018, the sentence was confirmed by the Supreme Court of Spain, and Rato entered prison on 25 October 2018. He was held in solitary confinement under the FIES regime. In 2020, the High Court acquitted Rato in a separate trial over falsifying accounts and other charges in the listing of Bankia when he was the bank's chairman. It later granted him a semi-release which allowed him to serve the rest of his sentence in partial liberty.

In December 2024, Rato was sentenced to a four-year jail term over tax crimes, corruption and money laundering committed in Spain during his tenure as head of Bankia. He was also fined more than two million euros and ordered to return 568,413 euros to Spain's tax authorities. Rato said he would appeal.

== Personal life ==
Rodrigo Rato has been married to Alicia González, a journalist from the newspaper El País, since 2015.

Party political offices
Preceded by Luis Ramallo	Leader of the People's Party Group in the Congress of Deputies; 1989–1996	Succeeded by Luis de Grandes
Political offices
Preceded by Juan Antonio García Díez	Second Deputy Prime Minister of Spain; 1996–2003	Succeeded by Javier Arenas
Preceded by Pedro Solbes	Ministry of Economy and Finance; 1996–2000	Succeeded by Cristóbal Montoro (Finance)
Preceded by Himself (Economy and Finance)	Ministry of Economy; 2000–2004	Succeeded by Pedro Solbes (Economy and Finance)
Preceded by Mariano Rajoy	First Deputy Prime Minister of Spain; 2003–2004	Succeeded by María Teresa Fernández de la Vega
Diplomatic posts
Preceded by Horst Köhler	Managing Director of the International Monetary Fund; 2004–2007	Succeeded by Dominique Strauss-Kahn
