= Ethan Alcaraz =

Spanish actor, teacher and model

- Born: 1990 (age 35–36); Spain
- Occupations: actor, teacher, and model

Ethan Alcaraz (born 1991 or 1992) is a Spanish actor, teacher, and model.

== Life and career ==
Ethan made one of his first public appearances in the media in 2018, when he appeared as one of the many interviewees in an episode of Eso no se pregunta (That is not a question), aired by TeleMadrid and centered specifically on trans people.

In 2021 he became the first trans man to be a candidate in the beauty contest Mister Reinado Nacional de Belleza. Ethan also had the public support of Ángela Ponce, who had previously become the first trans woman to win Miss Universo, and who was part of the direction of the edition of the contest in which Ethan competed. Ethan said he was surprised to be accepted into the contest, because he thought society would not yet accept a trans man competing in beauty pageants In November of the same year he participated in a round table about the Trans Law during the second day of the Transformers cycle, which was moderated by journalist Valeria Vegas and in which Elizabeth Duval and Carla Antonelli also participated.

He also appeared in the 2023 feature-length documentary Transuniversal, which narrates the historical and present struggle of the trans community in Spain, and which also included personalities like Juani Ruiz, Mar Cambrollé, Daniela Santiago or Samantha Hudson.

== Filmography ==
- Eso no se pregunta (2018, 1 episode)
- Transuniversal (2023)
- How to Become a Modern Man (2023)

== Personal life ==
Ethan started his gender transition six years before his first participation in the contest. His day to day job is as an English teacher at a school in Madrid.
