= Isabel Garcia =

Isabel Garcia may refer to:

- Chelo Alonso (Isabel Apolonia García Hernández, 1933–2019)
- María García (canoeist) (María Isabel García Suárez, born 1978), Spanish sprint canoer
- Isabel Garcia (clothing), a clothing brand
- Isabel Garcia (dentist), American dentist
- Isabel García Muñoz, politician
- María Isabel Salinas (María Isabel Salinas García), Spanish politician
- Isabel García Sánchez, politician

== See also ==
- Isabella Garcia (disambiguation)
