= Isabel García Sánchez =

Spanish politician (born 1968)

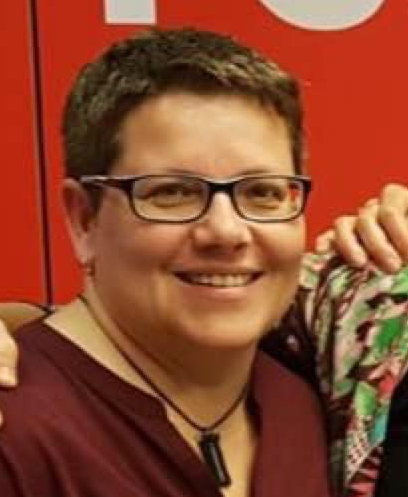

Director of the Women's Institute
- In office 27 December 2023 – 23 July 2024
- Preceded by: Ana Varela Mateos
- Succeeded by: Cristina Hernández Martín

Deputy for Equality, Youth and Sports
- In office 2015–2019
- Constituency: Provincial Council of Valencia

Councillor for Equality and Commerce
- In office 2015–2019
- Constituency: Chirivella

Personal details
- Born: Isabel García Sánchez; 1968 (age 57–58) Las Palmas, Spain
- Party: PSOE
- Occupation: Politician, equality policy consultant

Isabel García Sánchez (born 1968) is a Spanish politician specializing in gender equality and diversity policies. She served as Director of the Women's Institute from 27 December 2023 to 23 July 2024, when she was dismissed amid controversy over public contracts.

== Career ==
=== Early political career ===
García Sánchez began her political career in 2015 when she was appointed Deputy for Equality, Youth and Sports at the Provincial Council of Valencia, a position she held simultaneously with her role as Councillor for Equality and Commerce at the Chirivella City Council in Valencia until July 2019. During her tenure, García was responsible for initiatives including the creation of the Network of Municipalities against Gender Violence in the province of Valencia, subsidized by the Ministry of Equality in 2022, and the establishment of the Valencia Feminario, a national feminist debate space, as well as the International Congress of Women and Sports.

=== National government roles ===
After her experience in local politics, García took on more prominent roles at the national level. Between 2019 and 2022, she worked as an advisor to the Ministry of Transport, Mobility and Urban Agenda. Subsequently, she worked as an equality policy consultant in the private sector, developing projects in various fields and sectors.

=== Director of the Women's Institute ===
In December 2023, the Council of Ministers, at the proposal of Equality Minister Ana Redondo, appointed her Director of the Women's Institute, succeeding Ana Varela. Following her appointment, various LGBT+ groups, such as the Trans Platform Federation and Euforia Trans Allied Families, as well as trans rights activists including Elizabeth Duval, Carla Antonelli, and Mar Cambrollé, called on the government to revoke her appointment due to various comments and social media posts García Sánchez had made against the Trans Law and queer theory. The day after she assumed office, Sumar, the government's minority partner, criticized the appointment, with various party politicians describing it as "unacceptable," "disappointing," or "shameful."

=== Dismissal and controversy ===
García Sánchez's tenure as Director of the Women's Institute was marked by controversy. In July 2024, reports emerged that she and her partner had received at least 64 public contracts from PSOE-governed municipalities for managing "purple points" (puntos violeta) against gender violence, potentially earning €250,000. Following pressure from Sumar and media scrutiny, the Council of Ministers dismissed her on 23 July 2024, replacing her with Cristina Hernández Martín.

In October 2024, García Sánchez became the subject of a corruption investigation following a complaint filed by the trade union Manos Limpias regarding the alleged improper awarding of public contracts.
