= La Dani =

Spanish singer, actor and hairdresser (born 1991)

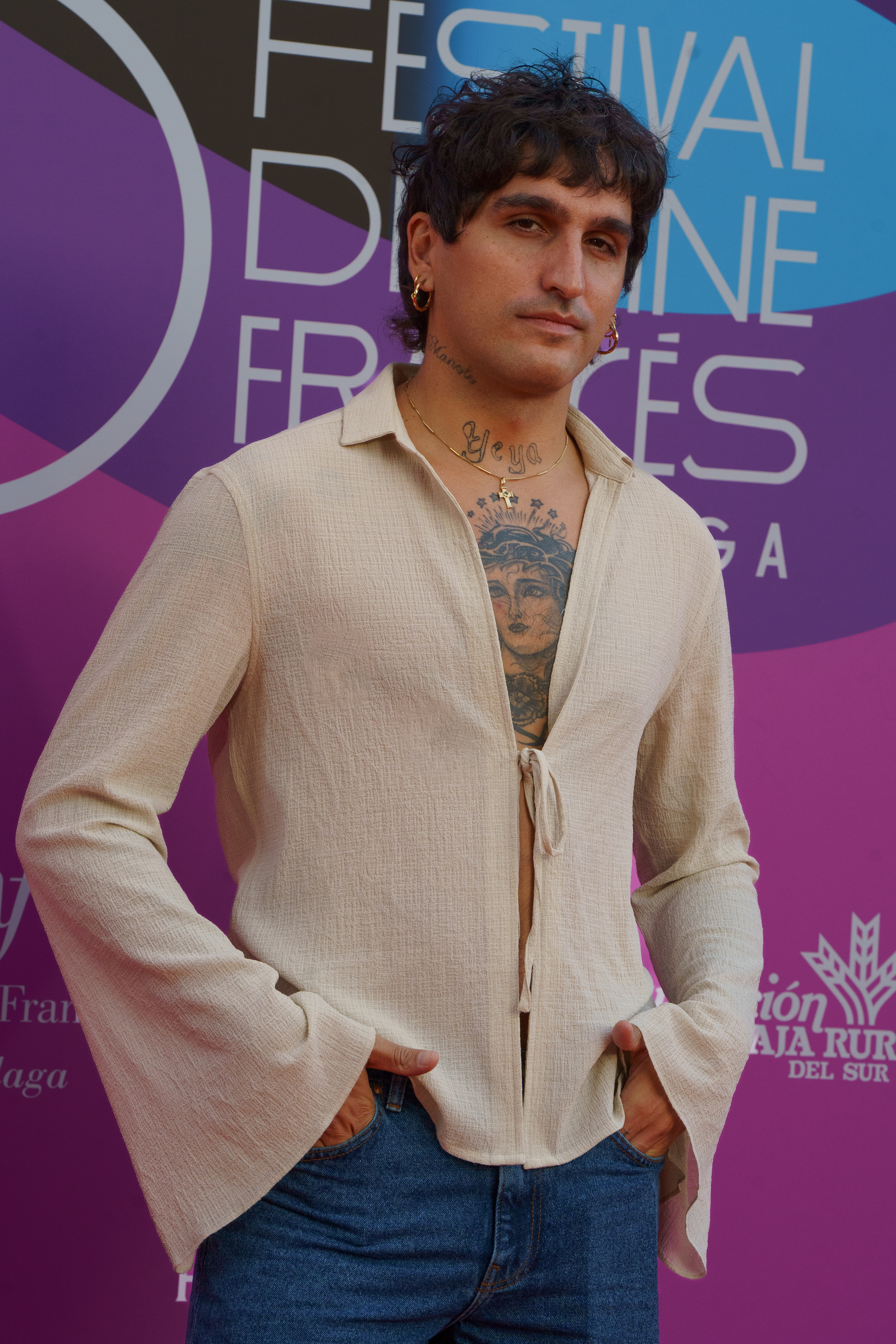
- La Dani in October 2024
- Born: Daniel Fernández Pozo; 1991 (age 34–35); Málaga, Andalusia, Spain
- Occupations: Singer; actor; hairdresser

La Dani (born 1991) is a Spanish singer, actor, and hairdresser.

== Life and career ==
Daniel Fernández Pozo was born in 1991 in Málaga. Self-identified as a non-binary person upon being introduced to the term by Alex de la Croix at age 20, La Dani never felt a woman and being a male had always bothered them "very much". Prior to that point, La Dani self-identified as a maricón.

In 2020, La Dani released the album debut Banana Split, followed by Greatest Hits (2021), and the EP Xiaomi (2023).

La Dani acting performance's as Dani in Love & Revolution (2023) obtained a nomination for the Goya Award for Best New Actor and a Feroz Award for Best Supporting Actor in a Film.

In 2024, La Dani was announced as the host of the 12th Feroz Awards gala.
