= Love & Revolution =

- Theatrical release poster
- Spanish: Te estoy amando locamente
- Directed by: Alejandro Marín
- Screenplay by: Carmen Garrido; Alejandro Marín
- Produced by: Antonio Asensio; Sergi Casamitjana; Paloma Molina; Aintza Serra
- Starring: Ana Wagener; Omar Banana; Alba Flores; Jesús Carroza; La Dani; Alex Delacroix; Carmen Orellana; Lola Buzón; Manuel Morón; Mari Paz Sayago
- Cinematography: Andreu Ortoll
- Production companies: Escándalo Films; Escac Estudio; Zeta Cinema; Zeta Audiovisual; La Pepa Films; Te estoy amando AIE
- Distributed by: Filmax
- Release date: 6 July 2023
- Running time: 107 minutes
- Country: Spain
- Language: Spanish
- Budget: €2.75 million
- Box office: €0.55 million

Love & Revolution (Spanish: Te estoy amando locamente, lit. 'I'm Loving You Madly') is a 2023 Spanish historical comedy-drama film directed by Alejandro Marín (in his directorial debut feature) starring Ana Wagener and Omar Banana alongside Alba Flores.

== Plot ==
Set in 1977 Seville, at a time homosexuality was a crime in Spain, against the backdrop of the struggle against the repressive Law on social dangerousness and rehabilitation, the plot follows Reme and her son Miguel (a wannabe singer and performer) who become acquainted with the budding Andalusian LGBTI movement.

== Cast ==
- Ana Wagener as Reme
- Omar Banana as Miguel
- Alba Flores as Lole
- Jesús Carroza as padre Manolo
- La Dani as Dani
- Alex de la Croix as Mili
- Carmen Orellana as Maca
- Lola Buzón as Paquito
- Manuel Morón as don Ignacio
- Mari Paz Sayago
- Pepa Gracia as Raquel

== Production ==
The plot is inspired by the genesis of the Movimiento Homosexual de Acción Revolucionaria ("Homosexual Movement for Revolutionary Action") led by trans activist Mar Cambrollé. Love & Revolution had British social comedy films such as Billy Elliot (2000) and Pride (2014) as references.

The film is an Escándalo Films, Escac Estudio, Zeta Cinema, Zeta Audiovisual, La Pepa Films and Te estoy amando AIE production. It was participated by RTVE, Movistar Plus+, Netflix, Canal Sur Radio y Televisión and Crea SGR. It also had backing and funding from ICAA, ICEC, ICO, Mogambo, and Triodos Bank. Shooting locations included Barcelona and Seville.

Rigoberta Bandini composed the song "Yo solo quiero amor" for the film score.

== Release ==
Distributed by Filmax, the film was released theatrically on 6 July 2023 in 109 Spanish screens following a rather muted promotional campaign. The film underperformed at the box office in the first two days, grossing €67,000. After three weeks, it had grossed €274,415.

== Reception ==
Raquel Hernández Luján of HobbyConsolas rated the film with 75 points ('good') highlighting the "luminous" character of the film, "featuring an encouraging message".

Ricardo Rosado of Fotogramas rated the film 3 out of 5 stars, highlighting Banana's arrival to big screen as the best thing about the film.

Miguel Ángel Romero of Cinemanía rated the film 4 out of 5 stars, underscoring it to be the Spanish version of Pride, making the LGTBI collective's struggle visible.

Javier Ocaña of El País deemed the "thrilling melodrama" to be an "inspirational film, very well produced and even better acted, in which there is hardly a blur", otherwise noting a potentially surprising feature of the film being the "total absence of sex".

=== Top ten lists ===
The film appeared on a number of critics' top ten lists of the best Spanish films of 2023:

- 6th — Mondosonoro (consensus)
- 10th — El Español (Series & Más consensus)

== Accolades ==
Year	Award	Category	Nominee(s)	Result	Ref.
2023	29th Forqué Awards	Cinema and Education in Values		Nominated	
2024	11th Feroz Awards	Best Comedy Film		Nominated	
2024	11th Feroz Awards	Best Supporting Actor in a Film	La Dani	Won	
2024	11th Feroz Awards	Best Original Soundtrack	Nico Casal	Nominated	
2024	11th Feroz Awards	Best Trailer	Mikel Garmilla	Nominated	
2024	3rd Carmen Awards	Best Film		Nominated	
2024	3rd Carmen Awards	Best New Director	Alejandro Marín	Won	
2024	3rd Carmen Awards	Best Original Screenplay	Alejandro Marín, Carmen Garrido	Won	
2024	3rd Carmen Awards	Best Supporting Actor	Jesús Carroza	Won	
2024	3rd Carmen Awards	Best New Actor	Omar Banana	Nominated	
2024	3rd Carmen Awards	Best New Actor	La Dani	Nominated	
2024	3rd Carmen Awards	Best New Actress	Álex de la Croix	Nominated	
2024	3rd Carmen Awards	Best New Actress	Carmen Orellana	Nominated	
2024	3rd Carmen Awards	Best Production Supervision	Carmen Garrido	Won	
2024	3rd Carmen Awards	Best Sound	Antuán Mejías, Fonsi Gil	Nominated	
2024	3rd Carmen Awards	Best Makeup and Hairstyles	Carmela Martín	Won	
2024	16th Gaudí Awards	Best New Director	Alejandro Marín	Nominated	
2024	16th Gaudí Awards	Best New Performance	La Dani	Nominated	
2024	16th Gaudí Awards	Best Costume Design	Isis Velasco	Nominated	
2024	79th CEC Medals	Best New Director	Alejandro Marín	Nominated	
2024	79th CEC Medals	Best New Actor	Omar Banana	Nominated	
2024	38th Goya Awards	Best New Actor	La Dani	Nominated	
2024	38th Goya Awards	Best New Actor	Omar Banana	Nominated	
2024	38th Goya Awards	Best New Director	Alejandro Marín	Nominated	
2024	38th Goya Awards	Best Original Screenplay	Alejandro Marín, Carmen Garrido	Nominated	
2024	38th Goya Awards	Best Original Song	"Yo solo quiero amor" by Rigoberta Bandini	Won	
2024	11th Platino Awards	Best Ibero-American Comedy Film		Nominated	

== See also ==
- List of Spanish films of 2023
