= Lola Buzón =

Spanish actress (born 1991)

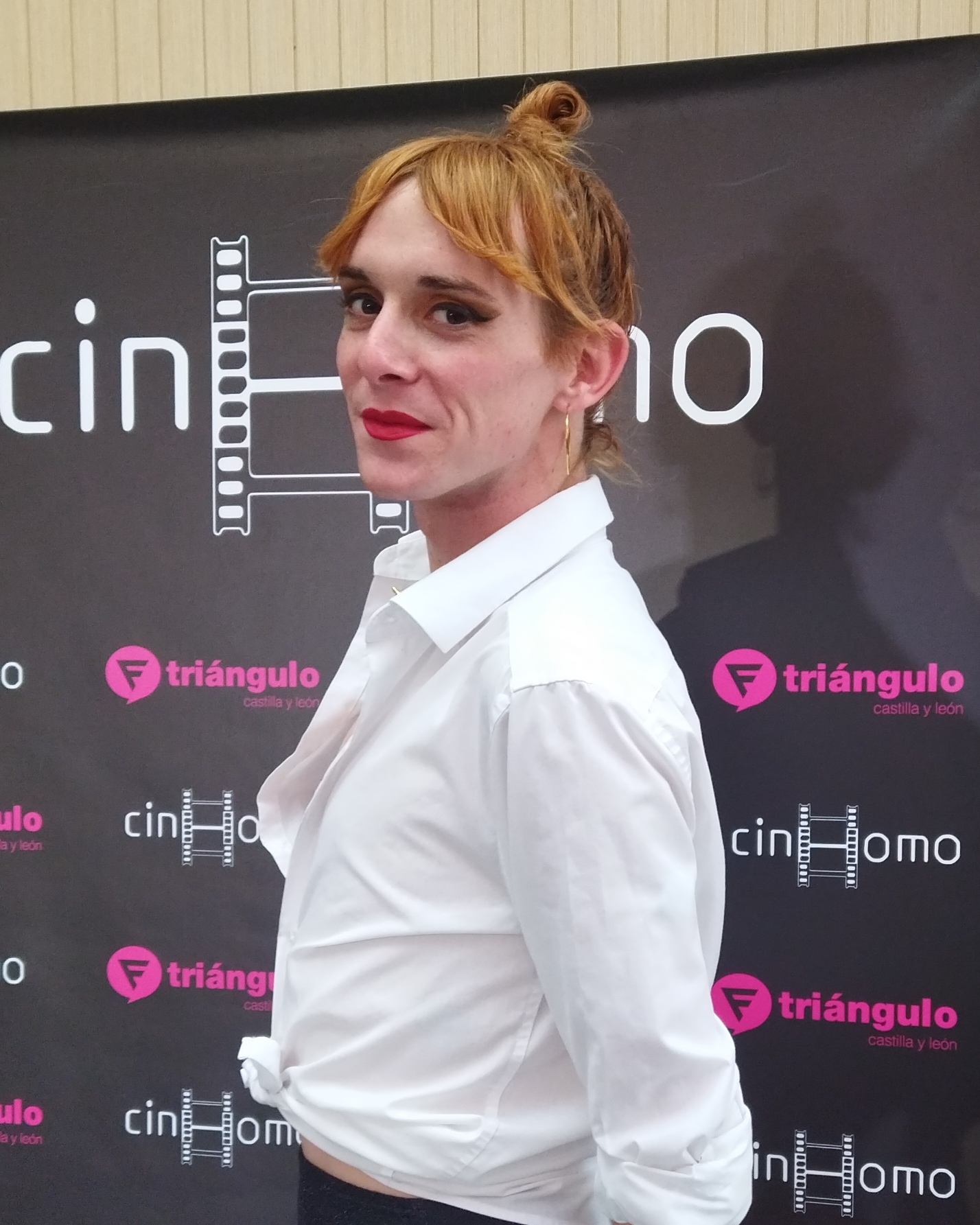
- Lola in 2024
- Born: 1991 (age 33–34); Seville, Andalusia, Spain
- Citizenship: Spanish and Peruvian
- Occupations: Actress; activist
- Notable work: Filmography
- Awards: see here

Lola Buzón (born 1991) is a Spanish actress and activist.

== Early life and education ==
In 1991, Lola was born in the city of Seville. She grew up in Triana, Seville. She attended the Madrid-based Work in Progress school to study acting. In addition, she works as a waitress in a Seville Mexican restaurant.

== Career ==
Lola's portrayal as "Paca" (Mar Cambrollé) in the hit movie Te estoy amando locamente has made her one of the most recognisable figures in the trans community in Spain. Along with her big-screen debut, she is a candidate for a Goya Award for the Best Supporting Actress category at the 38th Goya Awards recognizing the burden that would accompany winning in this category, she continues her studies at the Higher School of Dramatic Art in Seville, securing a spot in the transgender audiovisual program.

2023 saw the reading of the declaration of the LGTBI+ Madrid Pride in Plaza de Pedro Zerolo by the cast of Te estoy amando locamente, which included the artist Manolita Chen, Lola, Alba Flores, Ana Wagener, Omar Banana, Carmen Orellana, La Dani, Alex De la Croix, Jesús Carroza, Mari Paz Sayago, and Manuel Morón.

Lola was in the lineup of Rocky Horror Madness Show in February 2024, a program that blends live performances in Seville with screenings of The Rocky Horror Picture Show. She and author Valeria Vegas preached at the "Jaén pierde aceite" (Jaen is gay) event in the city of Jaén in June 2024, in honour of the International LGBT Pride Day.

== Filmography ==
Year	Title	Role	Notes
2023	Te estoy amando locamente	Paca (Mar Cambrollé)	

== Awards and recognitions ==
Award	Year	Category	Nominated work	Result
Goya Awards	2023	Best Supporting Actress	Te estoy amando locamente	Nominated
