= Elizabeth Duval =

Spanish writer and activist (born 2000)

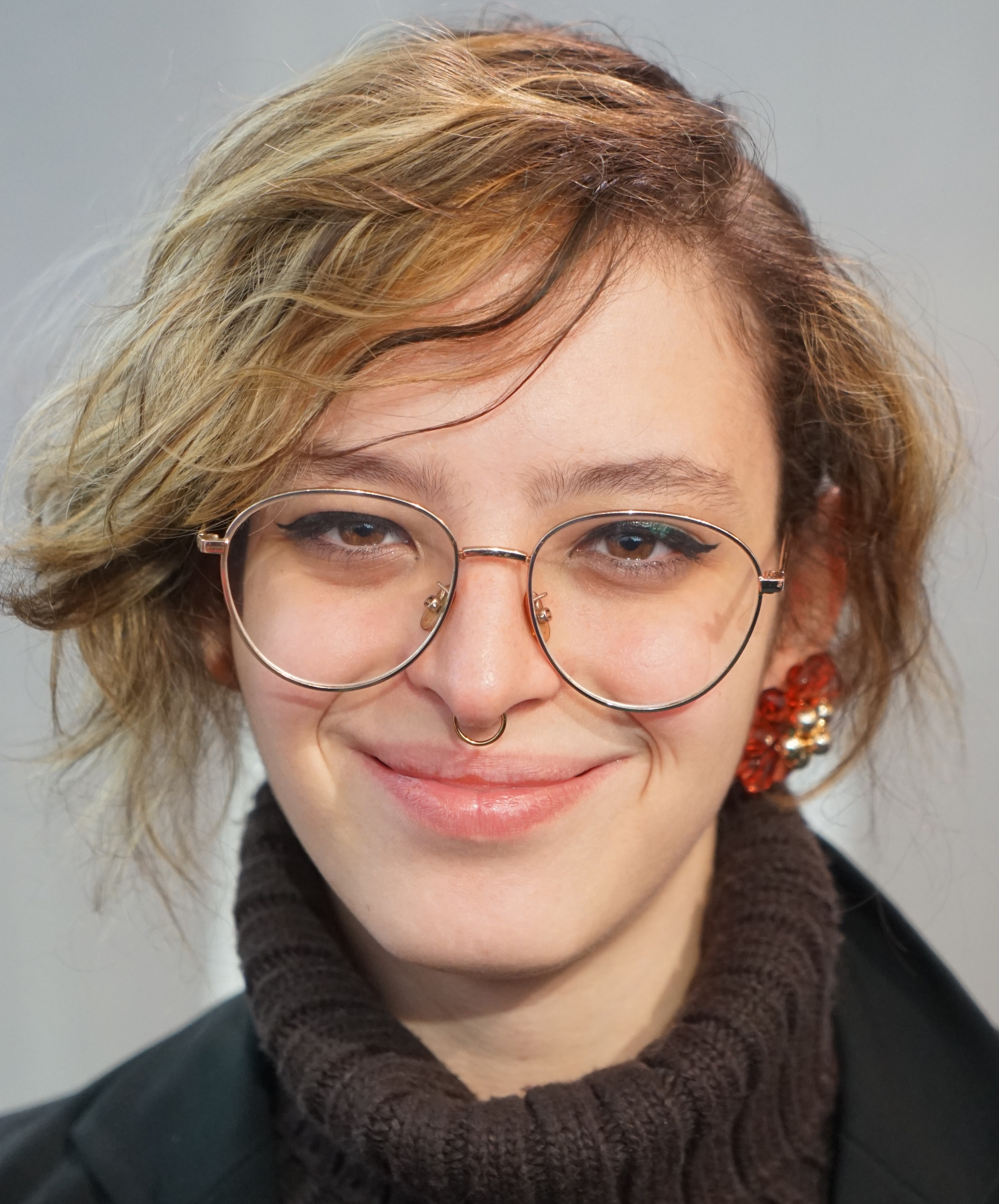
- In 2022

Sumar Secretary of Communication
- Incumbent
- Assumed office 27 April 2024
- Preceded by: Position created

Sumar Spokesperson for Feminism, Equality, and LGTBIQ+ Freedoms
- In office 4 July 2023 – 27 April 2024
- Preceded by: Position created

Personal details
- Born: 25 August 2000 (age 25) Alcalá de Henares, Madrid, Spain
- Education: IES San Isidro; Paris 1 Panthéon-Sorbonne University; Université Sorbonne Nouvelle
- Occupation: Writer, philosopher, philologist, activist

Elizabeth Duval (born 25 August 2000) is a Spanish novelist, poet, philosopher, philologist, critic, and trans rights activist. She has been current secretary of communication for the electoral alliance Sumar between 2023 and 2025.

== Biography ==
Duval was born in Alcalá de Henares, and subsequently spent six years of her childhood in Plasencia. She earned a licentiate in philosophy from Paris 1 Panthéon-Sorbonne University, and a degree in French philology from the Université Sorbonne Nouvelle.

She was a staunch defender of the reform of the Ley Trans, a 2023 law that permits gender self-identification in Spain. In 2017, she appeared on the cover of the magazine El País de las Tentaciones, interviewed alongside Topacio Fresh and Valeria Vegas in a report titled El futuro es trans (The Future is Trans). In 2021, she received the ICON Cultural Agitation Award from the fashion magazine of El País. In 2022, she hosted the interview podcast La noria for the Podimo platform, with guests such as Nacho Vigalondo, Nerea Pérez de las Heras, and Juan Manuel de Prada.

Duval headed the equality secretariat of the Madrid Union of Journalists from May 2023 until her resignation that July, when she was appointed Spokesperson for Feminism, Equality and LGTBIQ+ Freedoms for the left-wing coalition Sumar's campaign for the general election. In 2024, she was number seven on Yolanda Díaz's electoral slate for the Sumar Coordination Group, being elected in her first assembly. In March 2025 she announced she left the political alliance, after regarding the limitations of institutional activity.

She has been a regular contributor to the RTVE program Gen Playz and LaSexta's Al Rojo Vivo, and has participated in other current political programs such as El Objetivo, in addition to writing for media outlets such as elDiario.es, Público, El País, and CTXT.

== Work ==
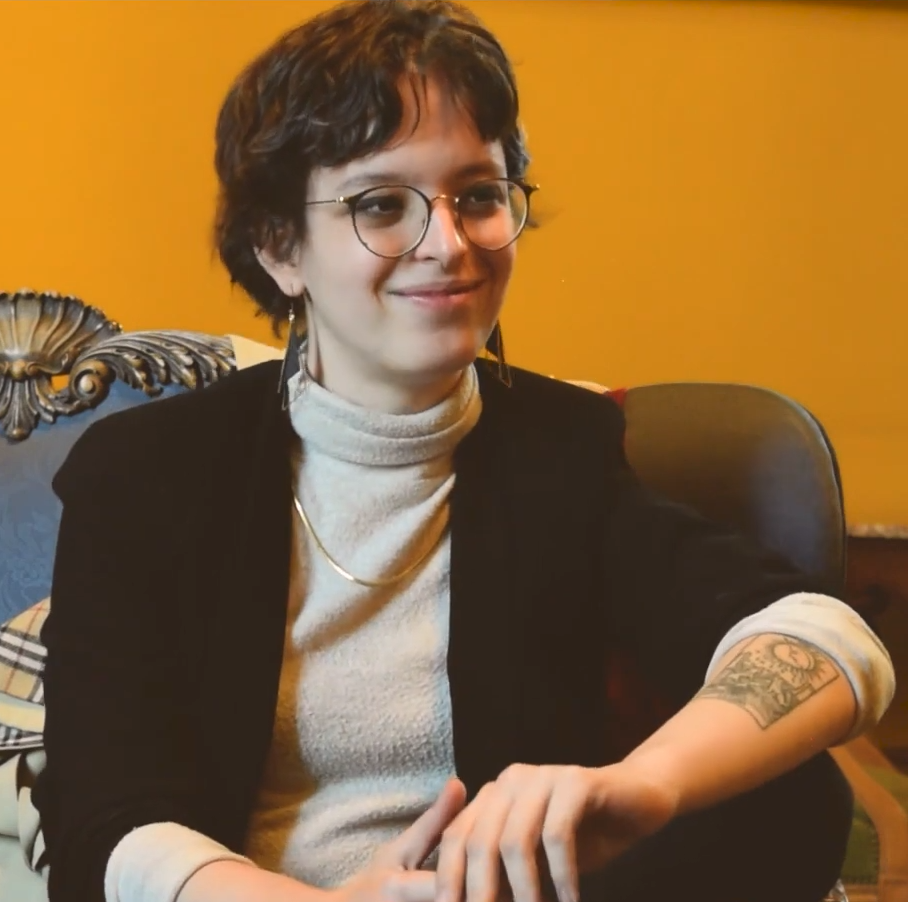
In a 2021 interview

Duval began publishing in 2018, in the anthology Cuadernos de Medusa, from the Amor de Madre publishing house. In 2019, she participated in an anthology of queer narrative stories titled Asalto a Oz (Assault on Oz). Her first collection of poems, titled Excepción, and her first novel, Reina, were published in February and March 2020.

In 2021, she published Después de lo trans (After Trans), an essay about transsexuality from a perspective of looking beyond the activism of the trans movement towards other critical and political viewpoints. Her work has been translated into English and German, with outlets such as the Frankfurter Allgemeine Zeitung and Die Tageszeitung calling Después de lo trans "a foundational text for all future trans theory" and "an example of independent thought." The Irish Times included Madrid será la tumba (Madrid Will Be Their Tomb) on its list of best foreign fiction novels of 2023.

=== Books published ===
- Excepción, Letraversal, 2020
- Reina, Caballo de Troya, 2020
- Después de lo trans. Sexo y género entre la izquierda y lo identitario, La Caja Books, 2021
  - German translation: Nach Trans. Sex, Gender und die Linke, Wagenbach Verlag, 2023
- Madrid será la tumba, Lengua de trapo, 2021
  - English translation: Madrid Will Be Their Tomb, Fum d'Estampa Press, 2023
- Melancolía, Planeta, 2023
- Poserótica, Letraversal, 2023
