= Isabella Garcia =

Isabella Garcia may refer to:

- Isabella García-Manzo, a Salvadoran beauty pageant titleholder
- Isabella Garcia-Shapiro, a fictional character from Phineas and Ferb

== See also ==
- Isabela Garcia (born 1967), Brazilian actress
- Isabel Garcia (disambiguation)
