= Isabel Garcia (clothing) =

Fashion brand

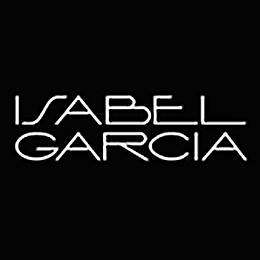

Isabel Garcia is a fashion brand founded in 2009 and based in Bologna, Italy.

== History ==
The Gold Label collection debuted at London Fashion Week in September 2014, which took place at Freemasons' Hall. The 17-18 collection presented dresses made of soft velvet sequins, elastic textured fabrics, graphic ornaments and color blocks are presented in this collection.

== Colors ==
Emerald green and bluish-coniferous hues, arctic blue, terracotta, purple, silver, shades of peach and pink are the main colors of the collection.

== Brands ==
Isabel Garcia develops two fashion lines in clothing and accessories:

- Gold Label: Clothes made of expensive fabrics
- Isabel Garcia: Elegant attires for prominent events

As of November 2014, the company had approximately 200 employees.

== See also ==
- Ciesse Piumini
- La Perla (clothing)
