= Federación Plataforma Trans =

Spanish trans rights organization

- Trans Platform Federation
- Location: Spain
- President: Mar Cambrollé
- Website: plataformatrans.es

The Federación Plataforma Trans (En: Trans Platform Federation, also translated as the Platform for Trans Rights) is a Spanish transgender rights advocacy group. Founded in 2015, the organization has advocated for trans and intersex rights by involving themselves in legal battles, lobbying and petitioning Spanish politicians, and coordinating smaller advocacy groups across the country. It is a member organization of ILGA-Europe and the spokesperson organization for the Council for the Participation of LGBTI People.

== Background and founding ==
The context for modern Spanish trans rights discussions began with Francisco Franco's crackdown on homosexuality and other queer expression that began in the fifties with the Law on Vagrants and Crooks (1954) and other laws that allowed the Franco regime to crack down on homosexual and transgender citizens. Following his death in 1975 public advocacy organizations began appearing, such as the Revolutionary Action Homosexual Movement (MHAR) which current Trans Platform Federation founder Mar Cambrollé also founded. This organization would lead the first demonstration for sexual freedom in June 1978 in Andalusia. Almost thirty years later, the Trans Federation Platform was founded in 2015 with the stated goal of unifying existing trans advocacy groups, encompassing eleven trans rights groups around Spain.

== Supported legislature ==
In 2018, the Trans Platform Federation supported the Unidas Podemos in registering the Proposición de Ley sobre la protección jurídica de las personas trans y el derecho a la libre determinación de la identidad sexual y expresión de género (En: Bill on the Legal Protection of Transgender Individuals and the Right to Self-Determination of Sexual Identity and Gender Expression). This bill, while not ultimately passed, began pushing the issue of trans recognition in federal law.

In 2021, the organization protested in support of a bill working its way through the Spanish government to allow anyone to change their gender marker without a doctor's approval, court order, or other hurdles that are present in many other countries' processes for trans citizens.

In 2024, the Trans Platform Federation met with various parliamentary groups to promote a "trans memory law". This law would offer monetary reparations to trans citizens who faced discrimination, imprisonment, or physical harm resulting from the regime of Francisco Franco.

In 2026, the organization proposed a royal decree to multiple Spanish parliamentary groups. This proposed decree would regulate the procedures for carrying out name and legal sex changes for trans citizens, a process that was supposed to begin multiple years earlier with Article 50 of Law 4/2023. According to section two of that article, the procedures for name and sex changes were supposed to be in place before a year from the law's passing. However, according to the Trans Federation Platform after two years past the original deadline, the Spanish government hadn't done enough to offer these processes for trans citizens.

== See also ==
- LGBTQ rights in Spain
