= Ley Trans =

2023 law that permits gender self-identification in Spain

Cortes Generales
- Long title: Ley para la Igualdad real y efectiva de las personas trans y para la garantía de los derechos LGTBI ('An act for the real and effective equality of trans people and for the protection of LGBTI rights')
- Citation: BOE-A-2023-5366
- Territorial extent: Spain
- Enacted by: Congress of Deputies
- Enacted by: Senate of Spain
- Commenced: 2 March 2023

Legislative history

Initiating chamber: Congress of Deputies
- First reading: 21 December 2022
- Voting summary: 188 voted for; 150 voted against
- Second reading: 16 February 2023
- Voting summary: 191 voted for; 60 voted against
- Passed: 16 February 2023

Revising chamber: Senate of Spain
- Passed: 9 February 2023
- Voting summary: 144 voted for; 108 voted against
- Status: In force

The Ley Trans (lit. 'Trans Law') is a 2023 law that permits gender self-identification in Spain. The law allows individuals to change their legal sex, with differing levels of approval required based on their age. People older than 16 years can solicit this change by themselves, while those aged 14 to 16 years may solicit this change only with the approval of their parents. Those aged 12 and 13 may also solicit a legal sex change with judge approval. The law does not allow people to switch to a non-binary gender, which does not exist in Spanish law. However, it does ban efforts to change people's gender expression, sexual orientation or sexual identity through conversion therapy.

Countries in Europe allowing gender self-identification

== Background ==
The Andalusian autonomous government passed a gender self-identification (self-ID) law as early as 2014. It was proposed by the Asociación de Transexuales de Andalucía (ATA) Sylvia Rivera. 15 other Spanish autonomous communities passed self-ID laws before the Ley Trans was passed on the national level.

On the national level, the political confederation of Unidas Podemos, En Comú Podem, and En Marea on 23 February 2018 made a legal proposal for a self-ID law in the Spanish lower house, the Congress of Deputies. The proposal, titled Proposición de Ley sobre la protección jurídica de las personas trans y el derecho a la libre determinación de la identidad sexual y expresión de género, was also supported by the Federación Plataforma Trans. It included the rights to

- self-identification for over-16-year-olds,
- a change possible to female, male and non-binary gender,
- hormone therapy without parental consent, or otherwise, the support of a legal defender.

The proposal provided for these rights to be without medical or psychological assessment, and without undergoing medical, surgical or other treatments.

== Legislative history ==
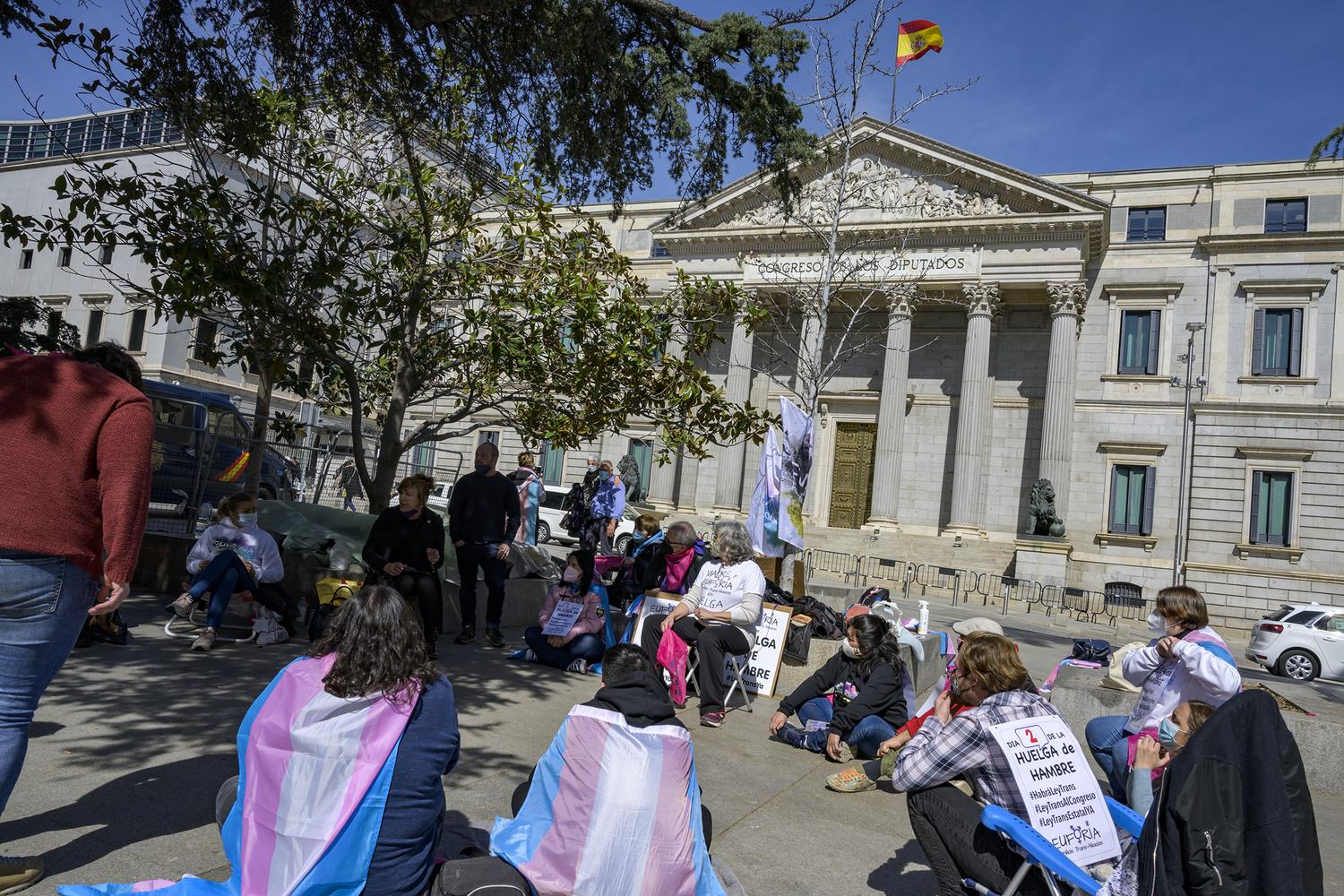
70 trans activists and mothers of underage trans people hunger-striking in front of the Congress of Deputies.

=== Government plans and gridlock ===
The 2019 coalition agreement of the second government of Pedro Sánchez (Spain's 14th legislature) provided for the introduction of gender self-identification (self-ID). The coalition was formed by a triple alliance of Unidas Podemos, En Comú Podem (which co-sponsored the previous proposal), and Galicia en Común, and the Socialist Workers' Party, which received the most seats of the four parties. In 2020, at the beginning of the legislative period, the Ministry of Equality led by Irene Montero stated that it would develop a self-ID law. However, some Socialists such as Carmen Calvo blocked the law.

On 10 March 2021, Mar Cambrollé, president of the Federación Plataforma Trans, led a hunger strike of over 70 trans people and mothers of underage trans people. Two days into the strike, the parliamentary groups of Esquerra Republicana de Catalunya (ERC), Más País, Candidatura d'Unitat Popular (CUP) and Compromís registered a joint law proposition it would pursue if the government did not advance its trans law proposal at the Council of Ministers on 23 March 2021. This ended the strike.

=== Government draft ===
On 17 March 2021, the Republican Left of Catalonia, Together for Catalonia, Más País, Coalició Compromís, Canarian Coalition, and Popular Unity Candidacy parties registered the draft, composed by the Federación Plataforma Trans, of what would later become the Ley Trans: the Proposición de Ley para la igualdad real y efectiva de las personas trans. The next day, on 18 March 2021, the draft was refused treatment by a vote with No votes coming from right-wing parties Vox and Partido Popular, and abstention from the Socialist Workers' Party. This refusal led the Federación Plataforma Trans to renew its call for unblocking the legal process and a boycott of Madrid Pride if no progress could be reached. It also led to the exclusion of Carmen Calvo, a member of the Socialist Party who opposed the draft, from the parliamentary negotiations.

On 29 June 2021, the Ministry of Equality presented to the Council of Ministers its draft for the Ley Trans. The document allowed for individuals over 16 years old to independently file for a change in legal sex without the need for a psychiatric report, as was required previously.

On 27 June 2022, the bill returned to the Council of Ministers and was approved, thus becoming an official legal project. This was the final, polished version and was more liberal compared to the original draft: gender self-identification was to be possible from 14 years with parental or guardian consent, and freely from 16 years. A gender change from 12 to 14 years of age was to be possible with judicial authorization only.

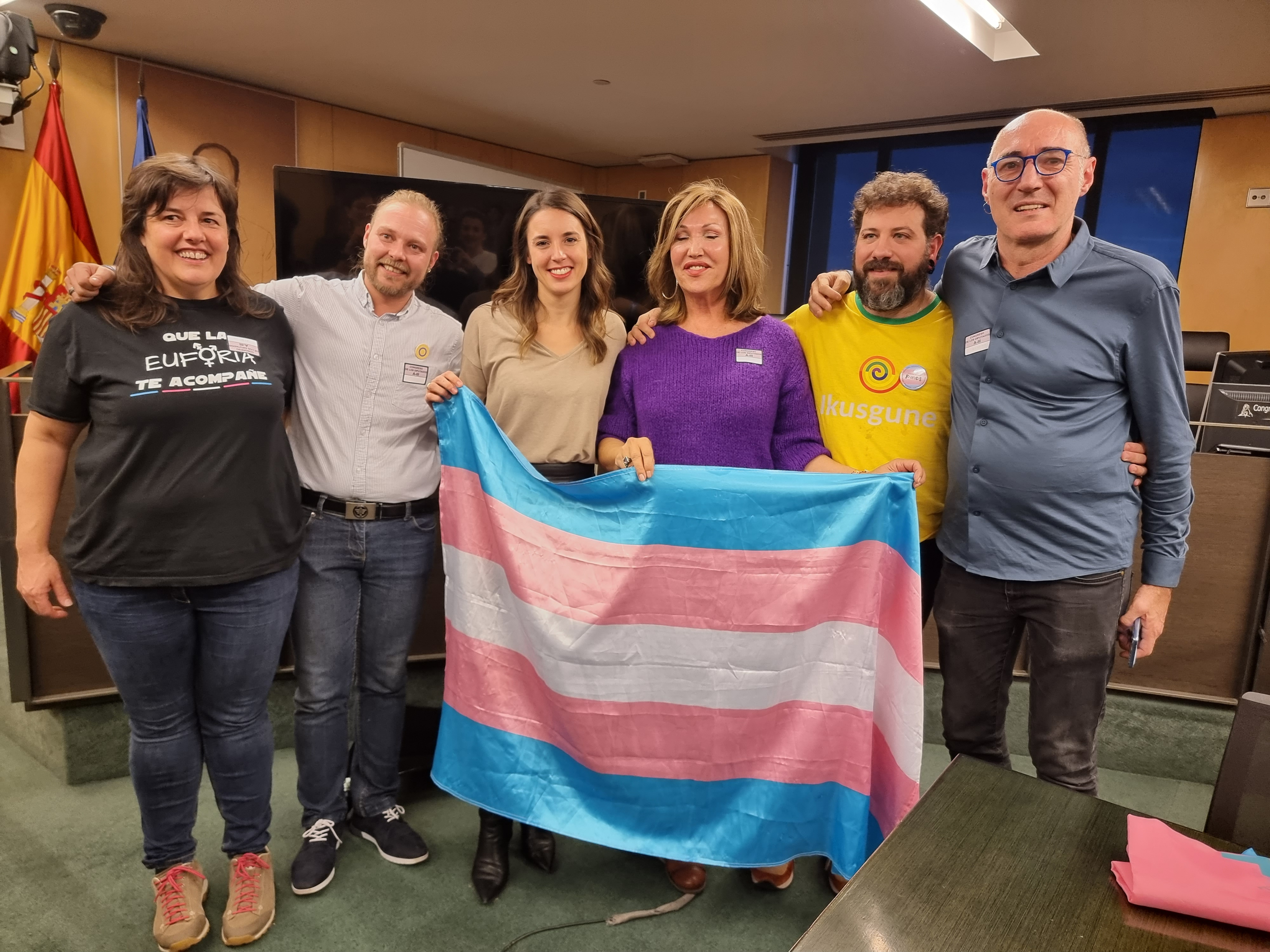
Equality minister Irene Montero with activists at the final vote in the Congress of Deputies.

==== Congressional readings and Senate approval ====
The bill was approved at first reading on 21 December 2022, with 188 votes in favor, 150 opposed, and 7 abstentions. The abstentions included Carmen Calvo, and three other Socialist Workers' Party deputies.

The Spanish upper house, the Senate, debated the law from 20 January 2023. The Socialist Workers' Union reaffirmed its intention not to request modifications to the law. The law passed the Senate on 9 February 2023 with 144 Yes votes, 108 No votes, and 2 abstentions.

The Ley Trans passed its final voting phase in the Congress on 16 February 2023. It was made law with 191 votes in favour, 60 against, and 91 abstentions.

=== Impact and status ===
The Ley Trans was the first of its kind to be passed and enacted in the European Union and stands as a controversial issue in the public opinion. Proponents of this law argue that 16 year olds in Spain already have the right to work, be sexually active, and get an abortion if needed. Thus, being able to change one's gender should legally also be possible. The legal changing of gender is also distinct from hormonal therapy or gender-affirming surgical procedures, so in the case of a change in mind, legal gender can be changed again. Others, however, are more skeptical of the law because they believe it rushes individuals into making rash decisions about their gender, leaving them no time to reflect on such an important change in their identity.

Politically, the right-wing Vox party continues to oppose the Ley Trans and seeks its repeal. The Vox July 2023 Electoral Program reinforces opposition to hormonal treatments and sex change surgery for minors and argues the alleged unconstitutionality of the Ley Trans. This opposition puts the ongoing 2023 Spanish government Formation under scrutiny, since some fear a Vox prime minister would roll back laws like Ley Trans.
