= Ciesse Piumini =

- Industry: Sportswear
- Founded: 1976
- Headquarters: Borgo a Buggiano, ITA
- Products: Down jackets, sports equipment, fashion accessories

Ciesse Piumini is a sportswear brand, founded in 1976 in Borgo a Buggiano by the owner of Ligron Spa, Silvano Cinelli.

== History ==
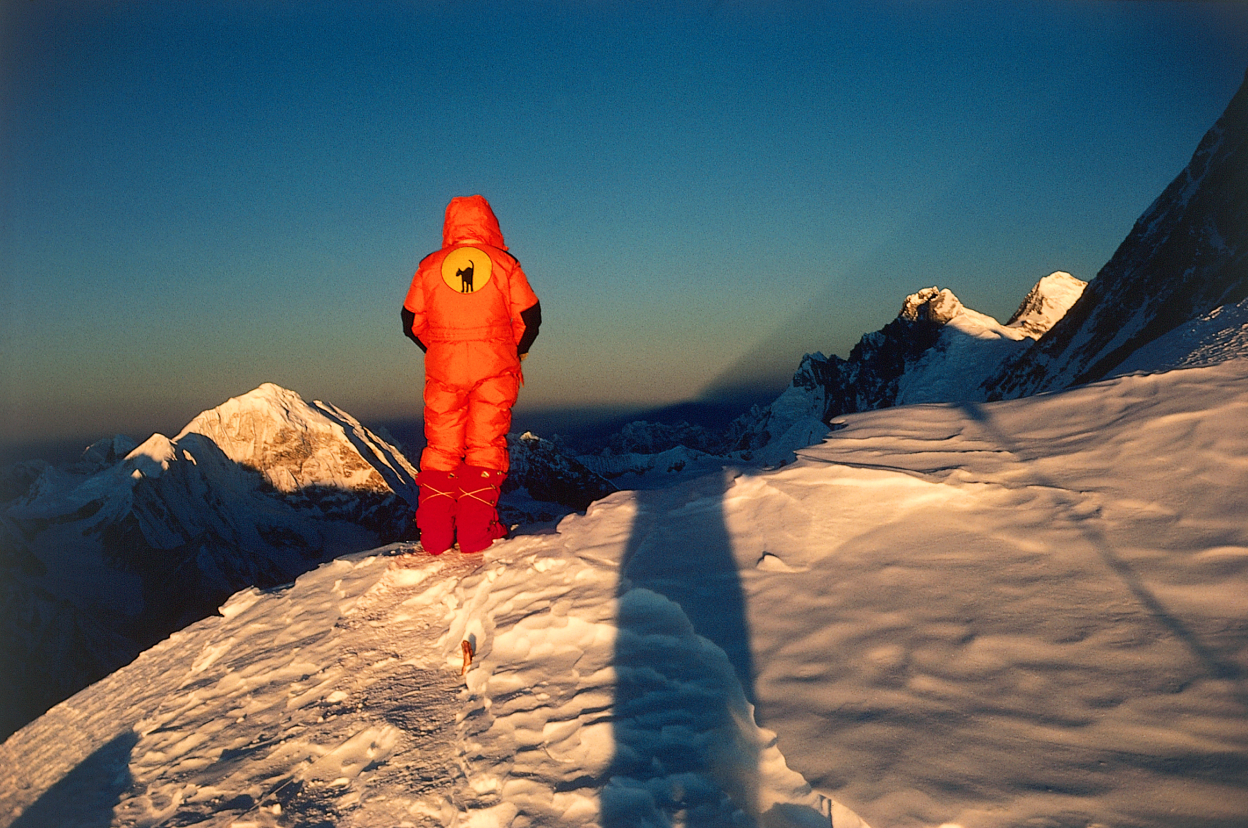
Expedition to the Himalayas equipped by Ciesse Piumini

In 1964 Silvano Cinelli founded Cinelli Piume. The company dealt with the processing of natural down and, until 1976, the production of pillows and quilts. That year, from the initials of its founder, the Ciesse Piumini brand was born, specializing in technical sportswear suitable for skiing and mountaineering.

The technical equipment for the first Italian expedition to Antarctica, organized by the then National Committee for Nuclear Energy (CNEN, now ENEA), was provided by Ciesse Piumini.

With the new production of technical sportswear and fashionable down jackets, also suitable for the city, a second plant was purchased in Ponte Buggianese and another complex in Altopascio, where, in 1984, some offices and part of the production were transferred. Ciesse was the first Italian company to produce sports down jackets and use Gore-Tex, a technical material invented in the seventies and considered cutting-edge.

From 1988, however, the decline began. After a particularly prosperous period, Ligron Spa recorded a sharp drop in turnover due to two mild winters that affected sales. On 17 March 1989, a fire destroyed an entire department of the Borgo a Buggiano factory, and at the same time, Italpiumini, another company owned by Cinelli, closed.

In 1993, Cinelli was forced to sell the brand to Fila due to difficulty competing. Fila Holding left it in 2003, along with Fila Nederland, Fila Sport, and Fila USA, to Sport Brands International, controlled by the US private investment fund Cerberus. In turn, the Cerberus fund sold the Ciesse brand in 2006 to another US fund, GEM (Global Emerging Markets), which attempted to list the company on the stock exchange without success.

It was the Italian Fremil International Spa, which already distributed the snow clothing brand, that relaunched Ciesse Piumini after years of market absence by acquiring it in 2010 from the GEM fund. Ciesse retraced its old steps by launching a collection at Pitti 2011 and focusing on a partnership with its sales network, collaborating to plan the right collection for a comeback.

In November 2019, Mittel, the financial company operating as a merchant bank in which Strocchi is one of the major shareholders, acquired 90% of Sport Fashion Service, the company that owns the Ciesse Piumini brand, for a total of 15 million euros.
