= Nerea Pérez de las Heras =

Spanish journalist, communicator, and feminist activist (born 1982)

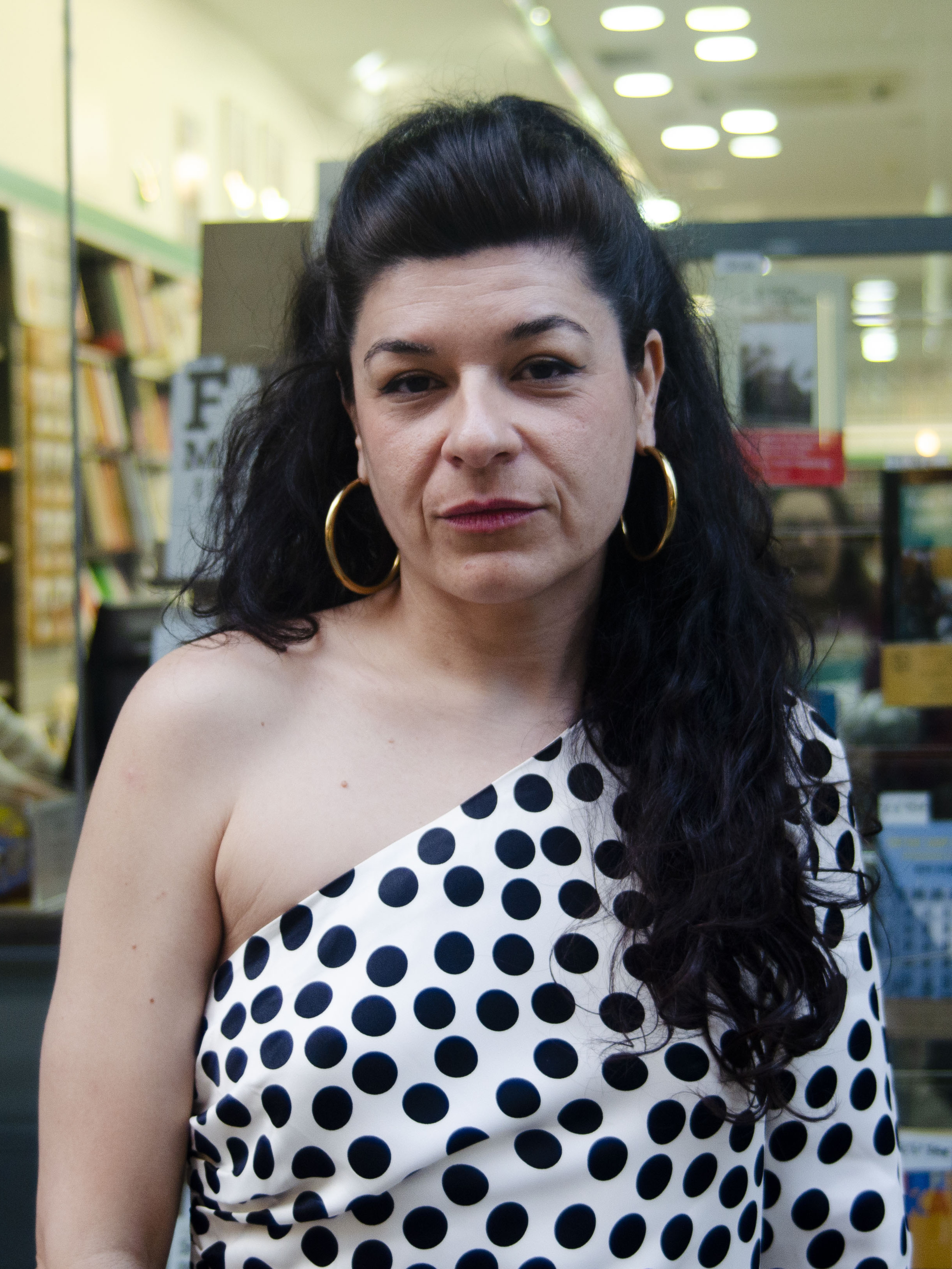
- Nerea Pérez de las Heras
- Born: 1982 (age 43–44); Madrid, Spain
- Education: Complutense University of Madrid (Art History, 2005); Master in Journalism, El País (2008-2009)
- Occupations: Journalist; communicator; feminist activist; comedian
- Known for: Feminismo para torpes (monologue, book, video series)
- Spouse: Ana García Espino
- Awards: Ondas Global Podcast Award (2024)

Nerea Pérez de las Heras (born 1982) is a Spanish journalist, communicator, and feminist activist. She is the author of the theatrical monologue Feminismo para torpes (Feminism for Dummies, 2016), which gained significant recognition and was later adapted into a video series for El País and a book published by Editorial Martínez Roca of Grupo Planeta. She is openly a lesbian and is married to Ana Garriga Espino.

== Life and career ==
Born in Madrid in 1982, Nerea Pérez de las Heras graduated with a degree in Art History from the Complutense University of Madrid (UCM) in 2005. She subsequently completed the Master in Journalism program at El País between 2008 and 2009.

As a journalist, she has worked in the editorial departments of various media outlets including El País, Vogue, Marie Claire, and Esquire. Additionally, she has collaborated with magazines such as El País Semanal, SModa, Mujer Hoy, Condé Nast Traveler, and Glamour, as well as with the radio program A vivir que son dos días on Cadena SER and the television program Las que faltaban on Movistar+.

=== Feminismo para torpes ===
While working for fashion magazines, Pérez de las Heras became aware of the need for feminism to change women's role in a patriarchal society. This awareness led to the creation of a comedy monologue titled Feminismo para torpes in 2016. The work uses everyday scenes, created from personal experiences, to analyze the messages women receive about how to behave and the difficulties they encounter in a male-dominated world. It also reviews milestones in the history of feminism and the stereotypes used by those who deny the existence of machismo.

The show, originally conceived as a work straddling between a comedy monologue and an educational conference, premiered in 2016 at Sala Equis and La Juan Gallery in Madrid, and in 2018 began to be programmed at the Teatro del Barrio, also in Madrid. The performance features two additional actors on stage, Laura Jabois and Luis Miguel Ríos, who help dramatize the situations of machismo in work, leisure, or internet environments discussed in the monologue.

Following her success as a comedian with this work, she produced a video series for the newspaper El País in 2018 and 2019 under the same name, which humorously critiques the sexist roles and behaviors existing in society. Continuing with the success of the monologue and videos, in 2019 she published the book Feminismo para torpes with Editorial Martínez Roca of Grupo Planeta, which received very positive reviews.

In December 2021, she premiered Cómo hemos llegado hasta aquí (How We Got Here) at the Teatro del Barrio in Madrid, a work of humor and social analysis written together with publicist and screenwriter Olga Iglesias and directed by Andrea Jiménez.

=== Podcasts ===
Since 2021, Pérez de las Heras has co-hosted the political current affairs podcast Saldremos mejores (We Will Come Out Better) with Inés Hernand on the Podium Podcast platform. This program emerged during the COVID-19 pandemic and its title refers to the possibility of improving as a society after what was experienced during the lockdown and subsequent restrictions. In September 2023, the adaptation of the podcast Saldremos mejores to a section titled Íbamos a salir mejores, pero... (We Were Going to Come Out Better, But...) within the program Hora 25, directed and presented by Aimar Bretos on Cadena SER, was announced. This announcement came after an accident suffered by Pérez de las Heras during the summer that resulted in the amputation of her right leg below the knee.

In April 2022, she began co-hosting the podcast Lo normal (The Normal) about LGBT topics on Cadena SER with journalist Antonio Nuño.

In March 2024, she began participating in the podcast Está el horno para bollos (The Oven is Ready for Buns) alongside educator Judith Tiral. The program, produced by Amazon Music, combines humor, history, and cultural analysis from a feminist and millennial perspective, celebrating lesbian and bisexual pride.

== Works ==
- 2016 – Feminismo para torpes. Monologue.
- 2018 – Feminismo para torpes. Video series for El País.
- 2019 – Feminismo para torpes. Ed. Martínez Roca, Barcelona. ISBN 9788427045309.

== Recognition ==
Nerea Pérez de las Heras was the presenter of the Festival de Cine por mujeres (Film Festival by Women) in the 2019 and 2020 editions, which showcases the best short films made by women and seeks to give visibility to directors of all types of fiction, documentary, or animation films.

On 27 June 2022, on the eve of 28 June, International LGBT Pride Day, she received the Reconocimiento Arcoíris (Rainbow Recognition), an award granted by the Ministry of Equality and the General Directorate for Real and Effective Equality of LGBT People, for the visibility of lesbian feminism and trans-inclusive feminism in an environment as masculinized as comedy and monologues.

On 10 April 2024, it was announced that the Premio Ondas Globales del Podcast (Ondas Global Podcast Award) for Best Conversational Podcast was awarded ex aequo to Saldremos mejores, by Nerea and Inés Hernand, and to Meterse al rancho by Santiago Alarcón. This recognition highlights the relevance of both projects in the Spanish-language podcast landscape.
