= Alex de la Croix =

Spanish filmmaker, actor, model (born 1993)

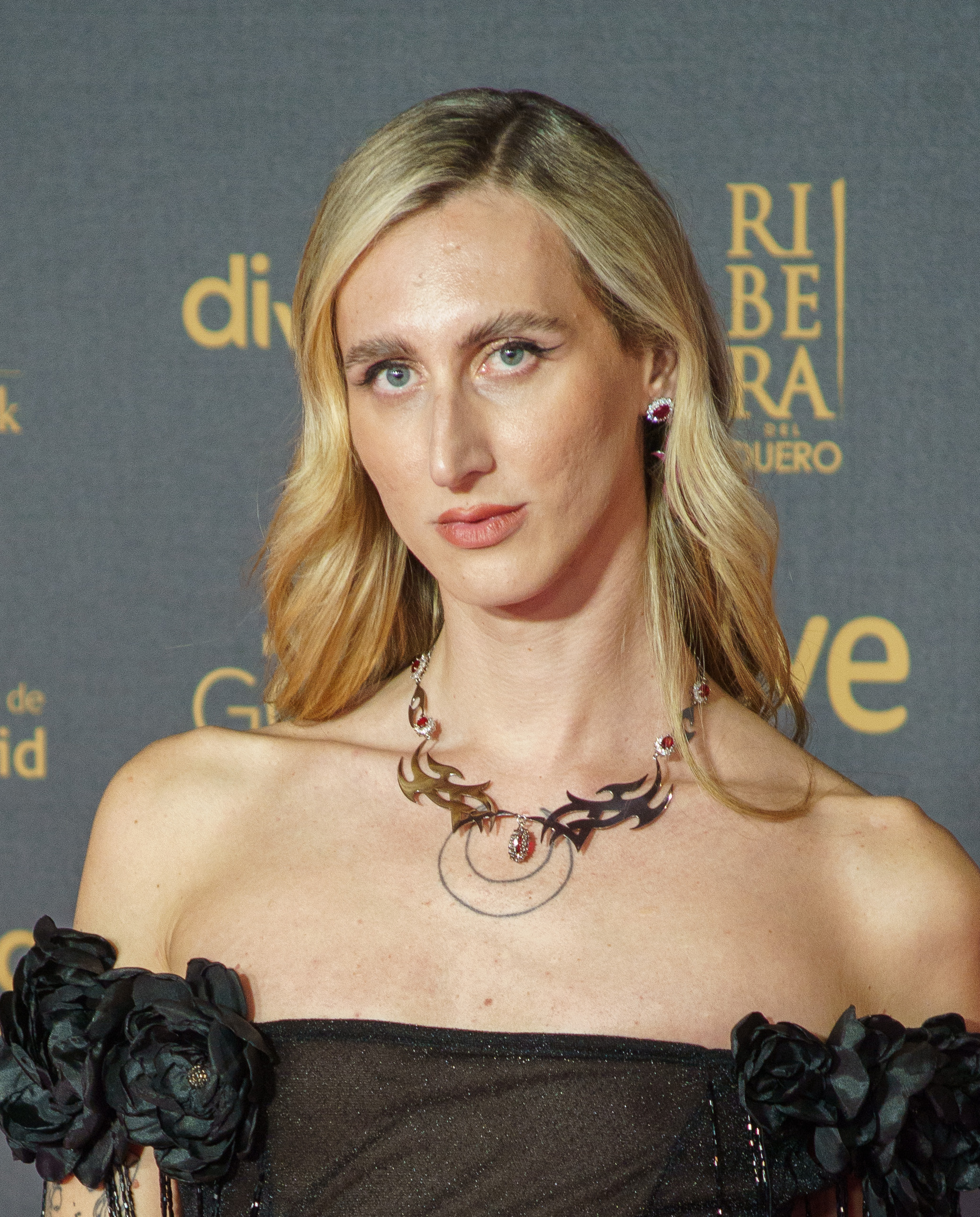
- de la Croix in 2024
- Born: 4 July 1993 (age 33); Puerto Real, Spain
- Occupations: Filmmaker; actor; trans rights activist; model

Alex de la Croix (born 4 July 1993) is a Spanish filmmaker, actor, trans rights activist, cultural manager, and model.

== Early life ==
de la Croix was born on 4 July 1993 in the Spanish municipality of Puerto Real in Cádiz, where they spent their early years raised in an all-female environment. At 18, they began studying audiovisual communication in Seville, but they moved to Madrid that same year to pursue their studies independently.

== Career ==
=== 2012–2015: First short films ===
In 2012, de la Croix settled in Madrid and met director Chus Gutiérrez, with whom they have collaborated regularly ever since. That year, after participating in a course taught by Gutiérrez, de la Croix directed an episode of the web series Nadia en cuesta for the online platform Mitele and collaborated on editing the feature film Droga Oral. Also in 2012, they won their first award at the Cuando el roce no hace el cariño short film competition in Cádiz. From 2012 to 2015, they created numerous experimental video art pieces and short films that earned them recognition at festivals such as MADATAC in its 2013 Realidades transmutadas edition and Notodofilmfest.

=== 2015–2021: Cultural management and work as model ===
In 2015, they co-founded the La Juan Gallery, a live art creation space in the center of Madrid, where they were a co-director and curator until 2020. In addition to their cultural management work, they taught Art Direction and Visual Narrative at the Istituto Europeo di Design in Madrid from 2018 to 2021.

As a model, they have participated in campaigns for international brands such as Calvin Klein, Levi's, Playboy, Paloma Wool, Missoni, and Di Petsa and have appeared in music videos for Sen Senra and Samantha Hudson. They have also been interviewed in magazines such as Neo2, Vogue Spain and Vogue Hong Kong, and V Magazine, which called them "one of the most important voices of the next generation".

=== 2021–2022: film debut and La que se avecina ===
In 2019, they began working on their first professional short film, Privilegiada, a fictionalized autobiographical project directed, written, and starring themself as part of the Indetectables series. Following its premiere in 2021, the short film was selected for national and international festivals in Barcelona, Valladolid, Seville, Brazil, the United States, and Canada. Subsequently, they began working on their first feature film, also directed, written, and starring themselves.

From 2021 to 2022, they presented and starred in various online projects for Prime Video. In 2022, they participated in the promotion of the Netflix series Fanático. That year, they also appeared in Rainbow, directed by Paco León, and joined the cast of the thirteenth season of La que se avecina, playing Karma, a neighbor in the new season set in central Madrid, which premiered in November 2022.

=== 2023–present: Leading film roles and television appearances ===
In late 2022, their participation in Love & Revolution was announced, in the role of Mili, the protagonist's friend, which premiered in July 2023 to critical and audience acclaim. In the days leading up to the premiere, they were chosen to give the opening speech for Madrid Pride alongside co-stars Alba Flores and Omar Banana. That same month, they also began production on their second short film, which they directed, wrote, and starred in.

Alongside their film work, they continued to appear on various television programs such as Telecinco's 25 Palabras and Mental Masters, and TVE's El Cazador Stars. In April 2024, HBO Max announced their participation in the seventh season of Pekín Express. The show premiered in October 2024, and their participation alongside their partner Guille Camas ended in the final stage of the competition, where they finished in third place.

In February 2026, Telecinco announced their signing as an official contestant for the new season of Survivor. The show premiered on March 5 of that same year.

=== 2025: Domingo de Gramos and El clan Cruz ===
In April 2025, coinciding with Palm Sunday, de la Croix announced the upcoming premiere of their second short film, Domingo de Gramos, written and directed by themselves and starring alongside Sara Ruiz Ferrer, with special appearances by Samantha Hudson and Miren Ibarguren. The following day, filming began on El clan Cruz, a feature film about their family, also directed by them.

== Themes of their work ==
Their early video art pieces were influenced by Japanese culture and the abstract, distinctly aesthetic nature of the microblogging platform Tumblr. Among their references, de la Croix mentioned Sailor Moon, Japanese folklore, and "J-Horror".

From 2018 onwards, with the Sor&Mor project, humor and irony took a central role in their work, which at that point became more narrative than before. Since then, de la Croix has regularly published comedic sketches on their social media accounts, influenced by traditional figures from Spanish culture and American romantic comedies from the early 2000s.

As a non-binary trans person and LGBTQ rights activist, de la Croix approaches their work from a queer perspective. Their short film Privilegiada was produced as part of the Indetectables series by the organization Apoyo Positivo, which focuses on raising awareness about sexual health and diversity. It uses comedy and fiction to address their own loss of rights upon ceasing to identify as male. They also frequently advocate for the visibility of the non-binary community and defend their identity-based right to express themselves beyond the limits of gender binarism.

== Filmography ==
=== Cinema ===
Year	Title	Role	Notes	Ref.
2021	Privilegiada	Olga	Director, screenwriter, and protagonist	
2022	Rainbow	Binguera	Cameo	
2023	Love & Revolution	Mili	Supporting character	
2025	Domingo de Gramos	Olga	Director, screenwriter, and protagonist	
TBD	El clan Cruz	TBD	Director	

=== Television series ===
Year	Title	Role	Notes	Ref.
2013	Nadia en cuesta	–	Director of episode 4	
2022–2024	La que se avecina	Karma	20 episodes	

=== Television programmes ===
==== As a contestant ====
Year	Title	Publisher	Notes	Ref.
2024	Pekín Express	HBO Max / DMAX	Contestant – 3rd Finalista	
2026	Supervivientes 2026	Telecinco	Contestant – Withdrew	

==== As a guest ====
Year	Title	Publisher	Notes	Ref.
2019	Mónica y el sexo	Cuatro	Guest (1 programme)	
2023	25 Palabras	Telecinco	Guest (3 programmes)	
2024	Mental Masters	Telecinco	Guest (1 programme)	
2024	El Cazador	La 1	Guest (1 programme)	
