= Mar Cambrollé =

Spanish trans activist

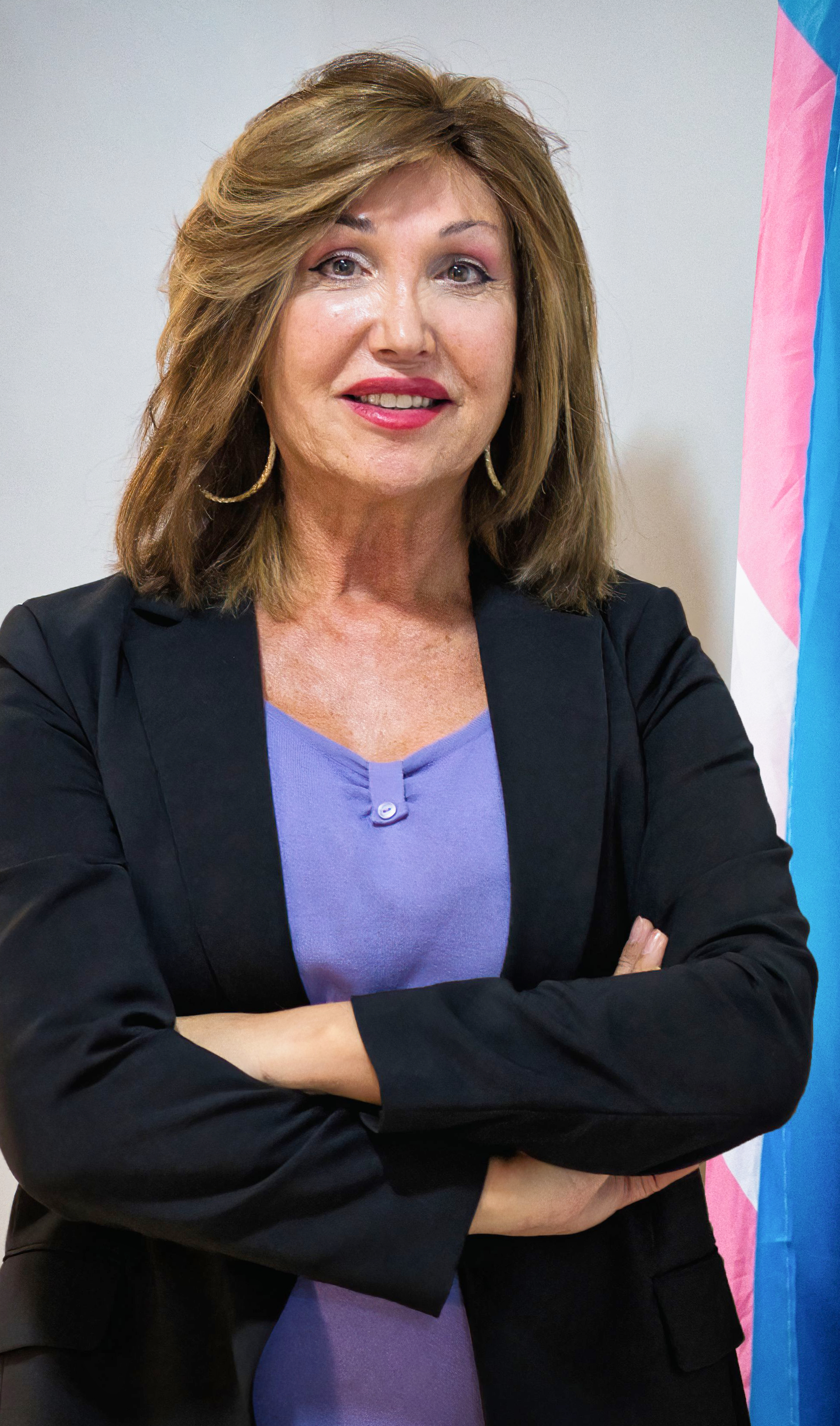
- Mar Cambrollé, 2022
- Born: 1957 (age 68–69); Seville, Andalusia, Spain

Mar Cambrollé Jurado (born 1957) is a Spanish trans rights activist.

== Early life ==
Mar Cambrollé Jurado was born in Seville in 1957. She suffered physical abuse from her father as a child for being feminine. She dropped out of school at age 13, and began working as a dishwasher at age 14.

Cambrollé sold crafts in Seville for 14 years, but did not make enough money to set up a storefront. She worked as a prostitute in Barcelona and Italy for a few months, then returned to Seville and used the money she had earned to buy furniture for her house and set up a store.

== Activity ==
Under the Franco regime, Cambrollé organized the first gay liberation campaign in Andalusia.

On October 3, 2018, Cambrollé and a group of 16 other trans people and parents with trans children began a hunger strike and called on Unidas Podemos to support the rapid passage of the Ley Integral de Transexualidad ("Comprehensive Transsexuality Law"). The hunger strike lasted eleven hours before Unidas Podemos agreed to bring the law to a debate in Congress by August 2019. Cambrollé expressed disapproval of the chosen deadline, but said that the hunger strike had been successful.

As of December 2018, Cambrollé was the president of the Asociación de Transexuales de Andalucía. As of March 2020, she was the president of the Federación Plataformas Trans.

== Accolades ==
In October 2018, the University of Málaga's Faculty of Psychology and Speech Therapy honored Cambrollé for her ongoing trans rights activism beginning in her youth.
