= List of accolades received by Society of the Snow =

Society of the Snow awards and nominations
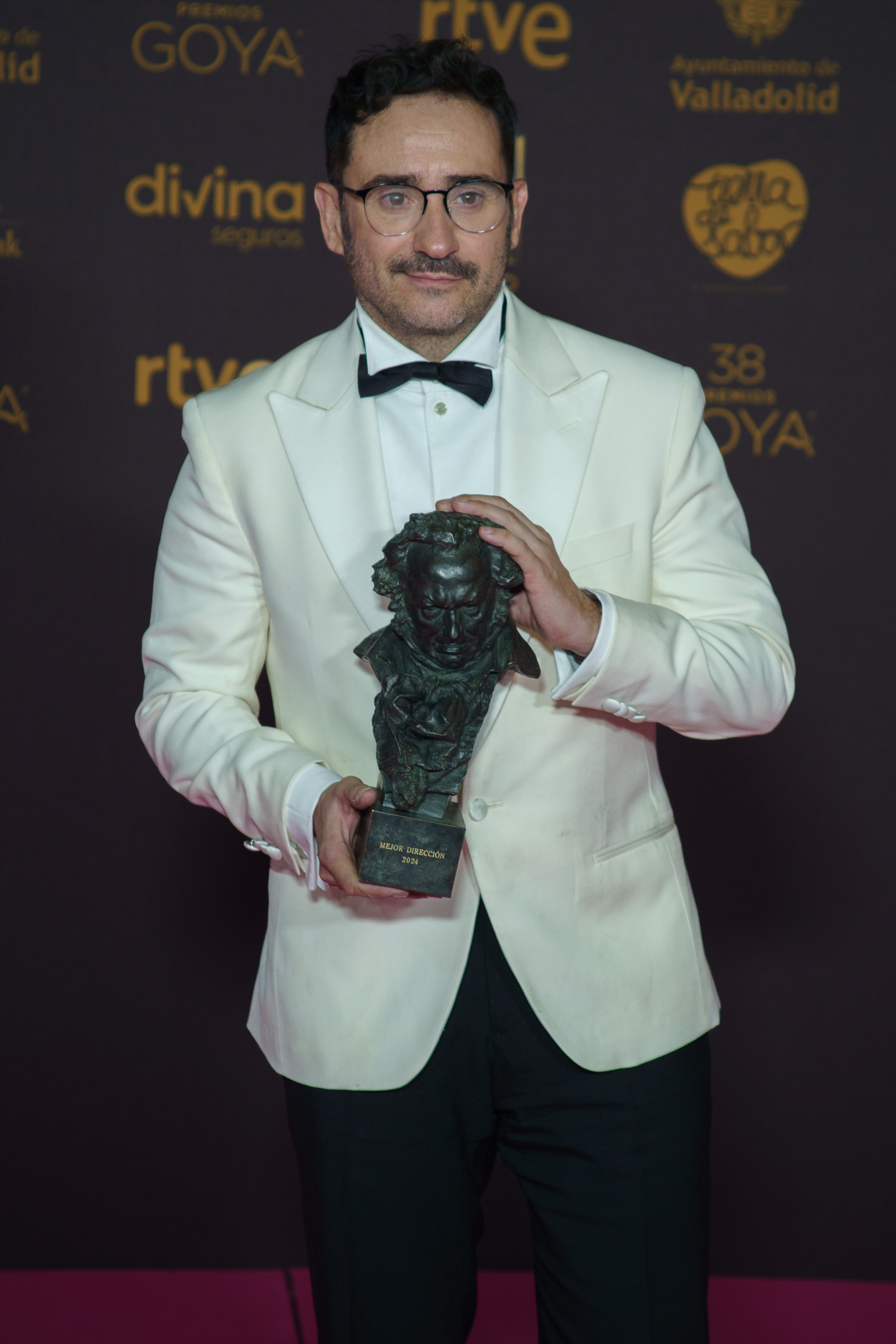
- J.A. Bayona holding his Goya Award for Best Director for Society of the Snow
Award	Wins	Nominations
Academy Awards	0	2
Golden Globe Awards	0	1
Goya Awards	12	13
Platino Awards	6	7
- Total number of awards and nominations
Totals	39	68

Society of the Snow (Spanish: La sociedad de la nieve) is a 2023 survival drama film directed by J. A. Bayona and based on Pablo Vierci's 2008 book of the same name, which details the true story of a Uruguayan rugby team's experience in 1972 after Uruguayan Air Force Flight 571 crashed in the Andes Mountains. A co-production between Spain and the United States, the film had a cast composed of Uruguayan and Argentine actors, most of whom were newcomers, and was shot mainly in Sierra Nevada, Spain.

The film closed the 80th Venice International Film Festival in an Out of Competition slot. It was theatrically released in Uruguay on 13 December 2023, in Spain on 15 December 2023, and in the US on 22 December 2023, before streaming on Netflix on 4 January 2024.

Society of the Snow received positive reviews. It won 12 awards including Best Picture and Best Director at the 38th Goya Awards, 6 awards at the 11th Platino Awards, and was nominated for 2 Academy Awards.

== Top ten lists ==
The film appeared on a number of critics' top ten lists of the best Spanish films of 2023:

- 1st — El Español (Series & Más consensus)
- 3rd — Mondosonoro (consensus)
- 4th — El Confidencial (consensus)
- 4th — El Mundo (Luis Martínez)
- 6th — El Periódico de Catalunya (critics)

== Accolades ==
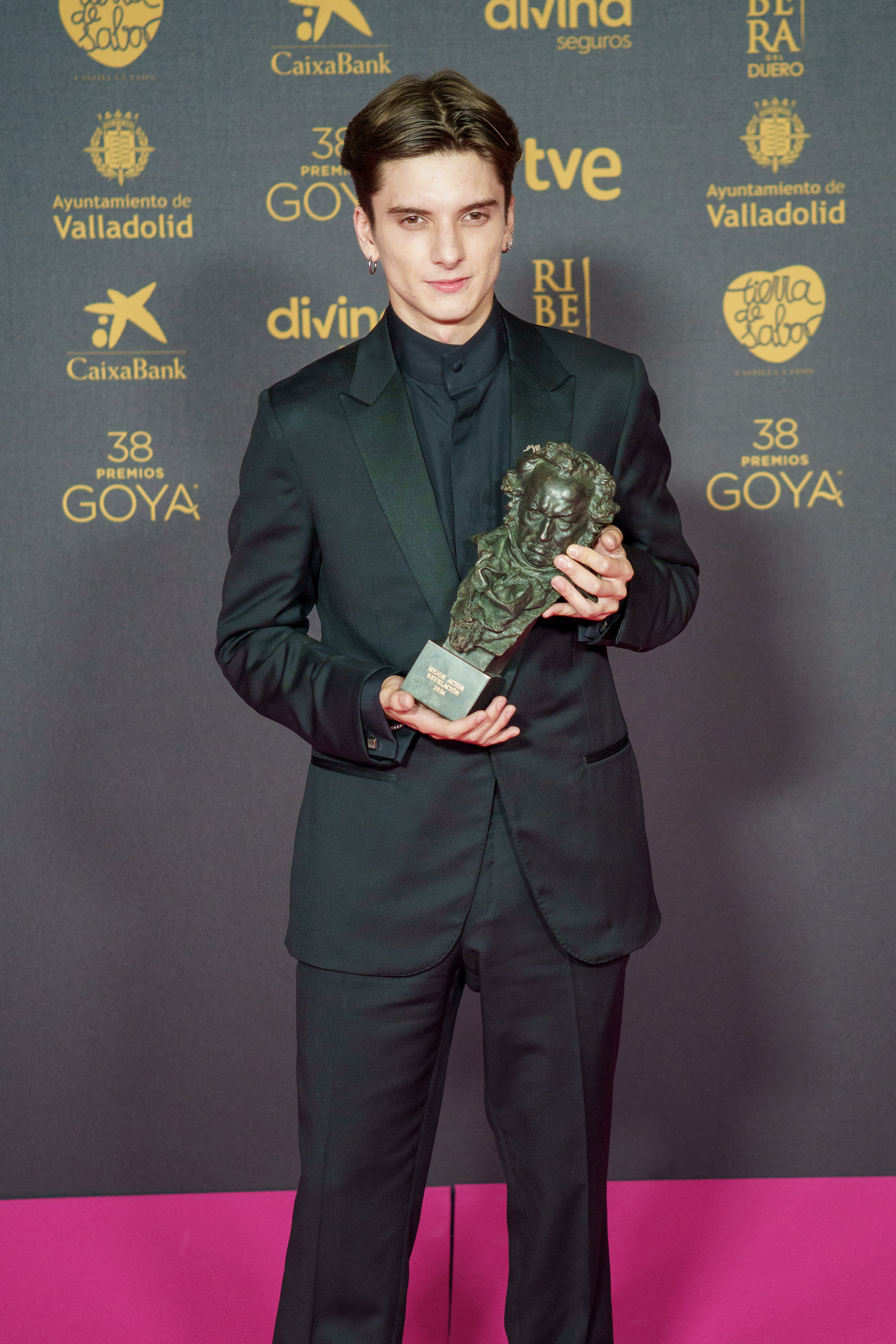
Matías Recalt holding his Goya Award for Best New Actor (Roberto Canessa) for Society of the Snow

Award	Date	Category	Recipient	Result	Ref.
San Sebastián International Film Festival	30 September 2023	City of Donostia / San Sebastian Audience Award for Best Film	Society of the Snow	Won	
Mill Valley Film Festival	12 October 2023	¡Viva el cine! - Narrative	Society of the Snow	Won	
Middleburg Film Festival	22 October 2023	Audience Award for International Feature	Society of the Snow	Won	
Hollywood Music in Media Awards	15 November 2023	Best Original Score — Independent Film (Foreign Language)	Michael Giacchino	Won	
Camerimage	18 November 2023	Golden Frog	Pedro Luque	Nominated	
European Film Awards	9 December 2023	Best Makeup and Hairstyling	Ana & Belén López-Puigcerver, David Martí & Montse Ribé	Won	
European Film Awards	9 December 2023	Best Visual Effects	Félix Bergés & Laura Pedro	Won	
Washington D.C. Area Film Critics Association Awards	10 December 2023	Best Foreign Language Film	Society of the Snow	Nominated	
Forqué Awards	16 December 2023	Best Film	Society of the Snow	Nominated	
Indiana Film Journalists Association	17 December 2023	Best International Movie	Society of the Snow	Nominated	
Indiana Film Journalists Association	17 December 2023	Best Score	Michael Giacchino	Nominated	
Dallas–Fort Worth Film Critics Association	18 December 2023	Best Foreign Language Film	Society of the Snow	4th Place	
Astra Film Awards	6 January 2024	Best International Feature	Society of the Snow	Nominated	
Astra Film Awards	6 January 2024	Best International Filmmaker	J.A. Bayona	Nominated	
Astra Film Awards	6 January 2024	Best International Actor	Enzo Vogrincic	Nominated	
Astra Film Awards	6 January 2024	Filmmaking Achievement Award	J.A. Bayona	Won	
Golden Globes Awards	7 January 2024	Best Non-English Language Film	Society of the Snow	Nominated	
Critics' Choice Awards	14 January 2024	Best Foreign Language Film	Society of the Snow	Nominated	
Critics' Choice Awards	14 January 2024	Best Score	Michael Giacchino	Nominated	
Houston Film Critics Society	22 January 2024	Best Foreign Language Feature	Society of the Snow	Nominated	
Feroz Awards	26 January 2024	Best Drama Film	Society of the Snow	Nominated	
Feroz Awards	26 January 2024	Best Director	J.A. Bayona	Won	
Feroz Awards	26 January 2024	Best Original Soundtrack	Michael Giacchino	Nominated	
Feroz Awards	26 January 2024	Best Trailer	Harry Eaton	Won	
Carmen Awards	3 February 2024	Best Non-Andalusian Produced Film	Society of the Snow	Won	
Gaudí Awards	4 February 2024	Best European Film	Society of the Snow	Won	
CEC Medals	5 February 2024	Best Film	Society of the Snow	Won	
CEC Medals	5 February 2024	Best Director	J.A. Bayona	Nominated	
CEC Medals	5 February 2024	Best Adapted Screenplay	J.A. Bayona, Bernat Vilaplana, Jaime Marqués, Nicolás Casariego	Won	
CEC Medals	5 February 2024	Best New Actor	Matías Recalt	Won	
CEC Medals	5 February 2024	Best Cinematography	Pedro Luque	Won	
CEC Medals	5 February 2024	Best Editing	Andrés Gil, Jaume Martí	Won	
CEC Medals	5 February 2024	Best Music	Michael Giacchino	Nominated	
Goya Awards	10 February 2024	Best Film	Society of the Snow	Won	
Goya Awards	10 February 2024	Best Director	J. A. Bayona	Won	
Goya Awards	10 February 2024	Best Adapted Screenplay	Bernat Vilaplana, J.A. Bayona, Jaime Marques-Olarreaga, Nicolás Casariego	Nominated	
Goya Awards	10 February 2024	Best New Actor	Matías Recalt	Won	
Goya Awards	10 February 2024	Best Cinematography	Pedro Luque	Won	
Goya Awards	10 February 2024	Best Editing	Andrés Gil, Jaume Martí	Won	
Goya Awards	10 February 2024	Best Original Score	Michael Giacchino	Won	
Goya Awards	10 February 2024	Best Sound	Jorge Adrados, Oriol Tarragó, Marc Orts	Won	
Goya Awards	10 February 2024	Best Art Direction	Alain Bainée	Won	
Goya Awards	10 February 2024	Best Production Supervision	Margarita Huguet	Won	
Goya Awards	10 February 2024	Best Costume Design	Julio Suárez	Won	
Goya Awards	10 February 2024	Best Makeup and Hairstyles	Ana López-Puigcerver, Belén López-Puigcerver, Montse Ribé	Won	
Goya Awards	10 February 2024	Best Special Effects	Pau Costa, Félix Bergés, Laura Pedro	Won	
Vancouver Film Critics Circle	12 February 2024	Best International Film in a Non-English Language	Society of the Snow	Nominated	
BAFTA Awards	18 February 2024	Best Film Not in the English Language	J. A. Bayona and Belén Atienza	Nominated	
Visual Effects Society Awards	21 February 2024	Outstanding Supporting Visual Effects in a Photoreal Feature	Félix Bergés, Micaela Gagliano, Laura Pedro Ezequiel, Larrú Pau Costa	Nominated	
Visual Effects Society Awards	21 February 2024	Outstanding Special (Practical) Effects in a Photoreal or Animated Project	Pau Costa, Carlos Laguna, Guillermo F. Aldunate, Eloy Cervera	Nominated	
Society of Operating Cameramen	24 February 2024	Camera Operator of the Year in Film	Society of the Snow (Juanjo Sánchez and Manuel Branáa)	Won	
Satellite Awards	3 March 2024	Best Original Score	Michael Giaccino	Nominated	
Satellite Awards	3 March 2024	Best Motion Picture – International	Society of the Snow	Nominated	
Golden Reel Awards	3 March 2024	Outstanding Achievement in Sound Editing – Foreign Language Feature	Oriol Tarragó, Iosu Martinez, Guillem Giró, Erik Vidal, Kiku Vidal, Sarah Romero, Marc Bech, Brendan Golden, John Finklea	Won	
Academy Awards	10 March 2024	Best International Feature Film	Society of the Snow	Nominated	
Academy Awards	10 March 2024	Best Makeup and Hairstyling	Ana López-Puigcerver, David Martí & Montse Ribé	Nominated	
NAACP Image Awards	16 March 2024	Outstanding International Motion Picture	Society of the Snow	Nominated	
ALMA Awards	20 March 2024	Best Screenplay in a Drama Film	J.A. Bayona, Nicolás Casariego, Jaime Marqués-Olarreaga, Bernat Vilaplana	Nominated	
Platino Awards	20 April 2024	Best Ibero-American Film	Society of the Snow	Won	
Platino Awards	20 April 2024	Best Director	José Antonio Bayona	Won	
Platino Awards	20 April 2024	Best Actor	Enzo Vogrincic	Won	
Platino Awards	20 April 2024	Best Supporting Actor	Matías Recalt	Nominated	
Platino Awards	20 April 2024	Best Cinematography	Pedro Luque	Won	
Platino Awards	20 April 2024	Best Editing	Andrés Gil, Jaume Martí	Won	
Platino Awards	20 April 2024	Best Sound	Jorge Adrados, Oriol Tarragó, Marc Orts	Won	
Grande Otelo Award	28 August 2024	Best Ibero-American Film	Society of the Snow	Won	
Ariel Awards	7 September 2024	Best Ibero-American Film	Society of the Snow	Won	
Macondo Awards	3 November 2024	Best Ibero-American Film	Society of the Snow	Won	
Saturn Awards	2 February 2025	Saturn Award for Best International Film	Society of the Snow	Nominated	
