= 20,000 Species of Bees =

2023 Spanish drama film by Estibaliz Urresola Solaguren

- Official poster
- Spanish: 20.000 especies de abejas
- Directed by: Estibaliz Urresola Solaguren
- Written by: Estibaliz Urresola Solaguren
- Produced by: Lara Izagirre Garizurieta; Valérie Delpierre
- Starring: Sofía Otero; Patricia López Arnaiz; Ane Gabarain; Itziar Lazkano
- Cinematography: Gina Ferrer García
- Edited by: Raúl Barreras
- Production companies: Gariza Films; Inicia Films
- Distributed by: BTeam Pictures; Luxbox
- Release dates: 22 February 2023 (Berlinale); 21 April 2023 (Spain)
- Running time: 125 minutes
- Country: Spain
- Languages: Spanish; Basque; French
- Box office: $1 million

20,000 Species of Bees (Spanish: 20.000 especies de abejas) is a 2023 Spanish drama film written and directed by Estibaliz Urresola Solaguren in her debut feature. It stars Sofía Otero, Patricia López Arnaiz, Ane Gabarain, and Itziar Lazkano. The film narrates the story of Lucía, an eight-year-old transgender girl, who is on a quest for identity. During a summer in a village house linked to beekeeping, she explores her femininity alongside the women of her family, who at the same time reflect on their own.

It was selected to compete for the Golden Bear at the 73rd Berlin International Film Festival, where it had its world premiere on 22 February 2023. Nine-year old Sofía Otero won the Silver Bear for Best Leading Performance for the role of Lucía. The film was also nominated for Best Feature Film Teddy Award. Estibaliz Urresola Solaguren, the first feature director was nominated for GWFF Best First Feature Award in the festival. In March 2023, the film won Golden Biznaga for Best Spanish Film at the 26th Málaga Film Festival. It was released in cinemas in Spain on 21 April 2023. The film was shortlisted for submission to 96th Academy Awards as Spanish entry for Best International Feature Film in September 2023.

== Synopsis ==
The film tells the story of a transgender girl and the effect her identity has on her family.

To help ensure an accurate portrayal, the director worked with Naizen, a regional association for the families of transgender minors, and they also provided guidance for Otero.

In the film, the family crosses borders, including the one that separates Bayonne, France from Laudio/Llodio in Spanish Basque Country.

== Cast ==
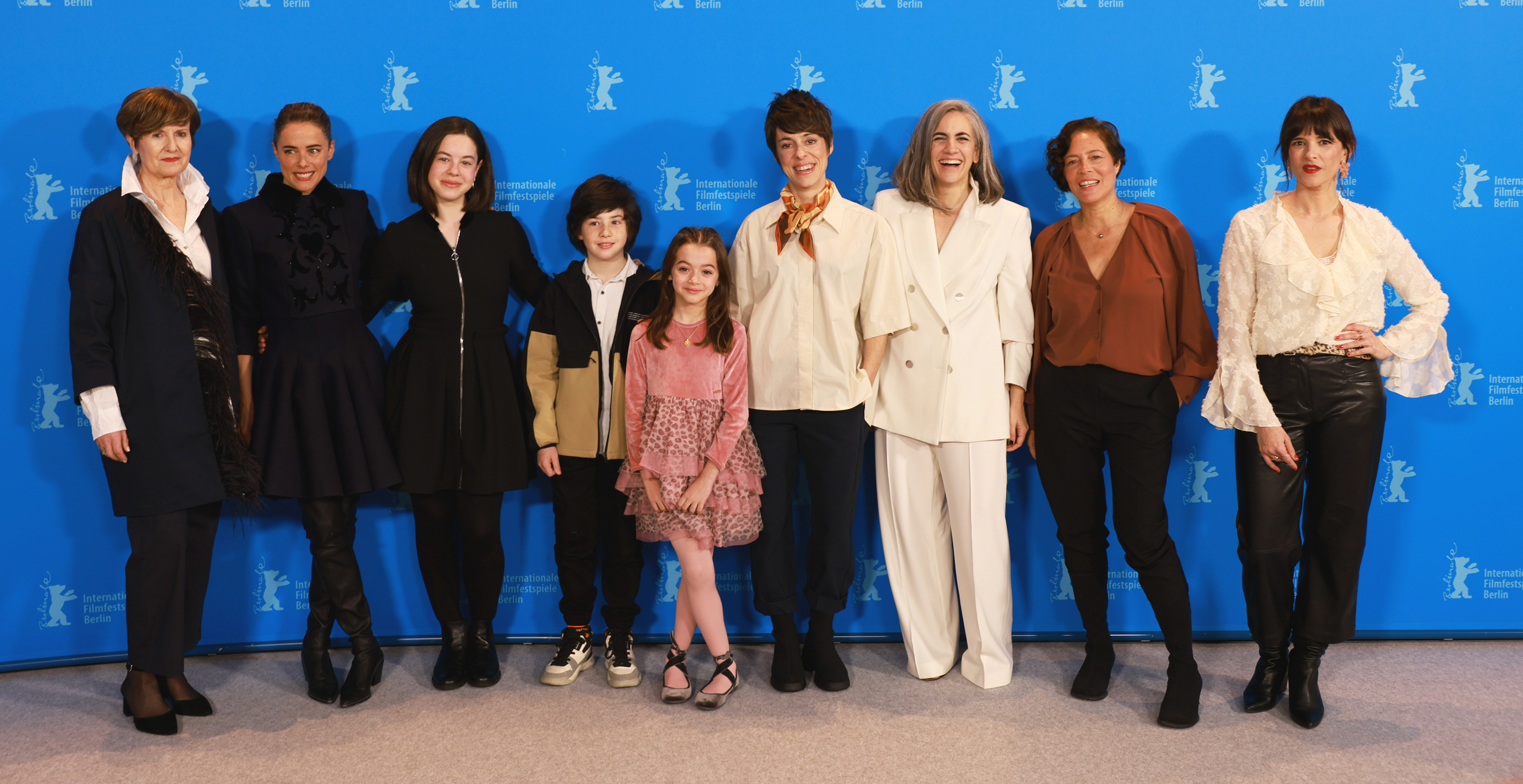
Crew and cast of the film at Berlinale

- Sofía Otero as Lucía
- Patricia López Arnaiz as Ane
- Ane Gabarain as Lourdes
- Itziar Lazkano as Lita
- Sara Cozar as Leire
- Martxelo Rubio as Gorka
- Miguel Garcés
- Unax Hayden
- Andere Garabieta

== Production ==
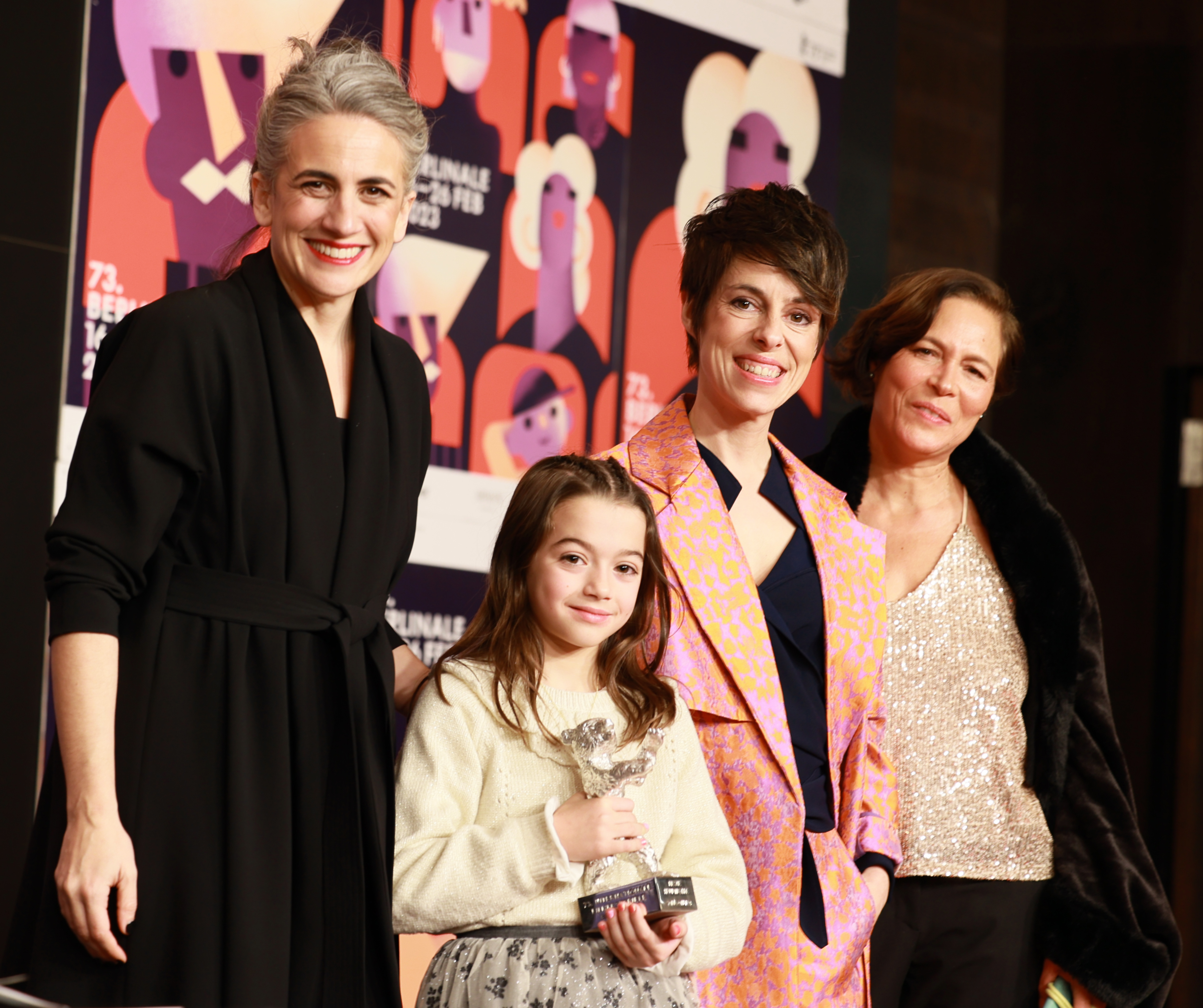
Sofía Otero with crew of the film

In July 2021, Estibaliz Urresola Solaguren was selected in the Mediterranean Film Institute (MFI), MFI Script 2 Film Workshops, which focuses on the field of training, specialising in script and project development. She also took part in the Berlinale Co-Production Market, feature-film project in 2022. The film was one of the 19 official selected projects for the 2022 Berlinale Co-Production Market. Inicia Films and Gariza Films took charge of the production.

The cast was finalized as: Sofía Otero as Lucía, Patricia López Arnaiz as Ane, Ane Gabarain as Lourdes, Itziar Lazkano as Lita, Sara Cózar as Leire Martxelo Rubio as Gorka along with Miguel Garcés, Unax Hayden and Andere Garabieta.

Shooting locations included Laudio and Hendaye.

== Release ==
20,000 Species of Bees had its world premiere on 22 February 2023 as part of the 73rd Berlin International Film Festival, in competition. It also made it to the 26th Málaga Film Festival's main competitive slate. In April it competed in the 47th Hong Kong International Film Festival, where it won the best actress for its female ensemble cast.

It was theatrically released in Spain on 21 April 2023.

It was reported on 14 January 2023 that Paris-based Luxbox has acquired the international sales right of the film, whereas BTeam Pictures will release the film in Spain. Film Movement acquired North-American distribution rights to the film.

In June 2023 the film was screened at the 70th Sydney Film Festival. It was also invited to the 27th Lima Film Festival in the Acclaimed section, where it was screened on 10 August 2023.

The film competed at the 2023 Calgary International Film Festival in 'International Narrative Competition' for Best International Narrative Feature award and had screening on September 23. It won International Narrative Feature, Special Jury Citation there. It was screened at the 71st San Sebastián International Film Festival in 'Zinemira' section on 22 September and won Sebastiane Award.

It was also screened at 2023 BFI London Film Festival in 'Strand' section under 'Love' theme on 10 October 2023, and made it to Special Spotlight: Basque Cinema of the 36th Tokyo International Film Festival, where it was screened on 23 October 2023. The film was selected in 'Focus Country: Spain' section at the 29th Kolkata International Film Festival and was screened on 8 December 2023.

On 24 March 2024, it was screened at the Sofia International Film Festival in European Parliament LUX Prize section.

== Reception ==
=== Critical response ===
On the review aggregator website Rotten Tomatoes, 93% of 42 critics' reviews are positive, with an average rating of 7.5/10. The website's consensus reads: "Led by young Sofía Otero's outstanding performance, 20,000 Species of Bees explores an array of weighty themes with gentle humanity." Metacritic, which uses a weighted average, assigned the film a score of 80 out of 100, based on nine critics, indicating "generally favorable" reviews.

Alfonso Rivera, reviewing the film for Cineuropa, praised Estibaliz Urresola Solaguren writing, "the filmmaker addresses plurality, exploration and transformation with a stratospheric sensitivity." Rivera praising performances of Patricia López Arnaiz, Ane Gabarain and Sofía Otero wrote, "superb work by her actresses, but there are not enough adjectives to commend Sofía Otero (keep an eye on her, it is impossible not to succumb to her talent)."

Nicholas Bell in IonCinema.com gave the film a score of three out of five, writing, "Touching and without being overly sentimental, Solaguren uses the titular diversity of bees to suggest our authentic roles all play an important part if we are to move beyond surviving to actually thriving".

The Hollywood Reporter's Jordan Mintzer called the film "A compassionate coming-of-ager" and praised Otero and Arnaiz's performances, calling the former "clearly the centerpiece of the film". Mintzer concluded: "20,000 Species of Bees returns to Ane's [Arnaiz's] loving — most memorably at the very close of the film when she not only firmly stands by her youngest child's bold decision, but appears to be empowered by it. As are we."

The film featured in compilation '15 films that stood out at Berlin 2023' of ScreenDaily.

Lee Marshall of Screen International praised Otero's performance, writing, "Sofía Otero is never less than compelling, her face a deep pool that becomes a magnet for the audience". In her concluding paragraph, she compared the film's climactic sequence of people on a search for a missing girl to a similar sequence in the 1973 film The Spirit of the Beehive (which in turn served as an homage to Frankenstein): "It's a masterful touch in an engaging, authentic, moving film about the way society persists in seeing monsters where there are none."

=== Top ten lists ===
The film appeared on a number of critics' top ten lists of the best Spanish films of 2023:ç

- 2nd — Mondosonoro (consensus)
- 3rd — El Confidencial (consensus)
- 4th — El Español (Series & Más consensus)
- 8th — El Cultural (critics)
- 9th — El Mundo (Luis Martínez)

=== Accolades ===
20,000 Species of Bees was nominated for European Discovery – Prix FIPRESCI in the 36th European Film Awards on 7 November. The awards ceremony took place on 9 December in Berlin.

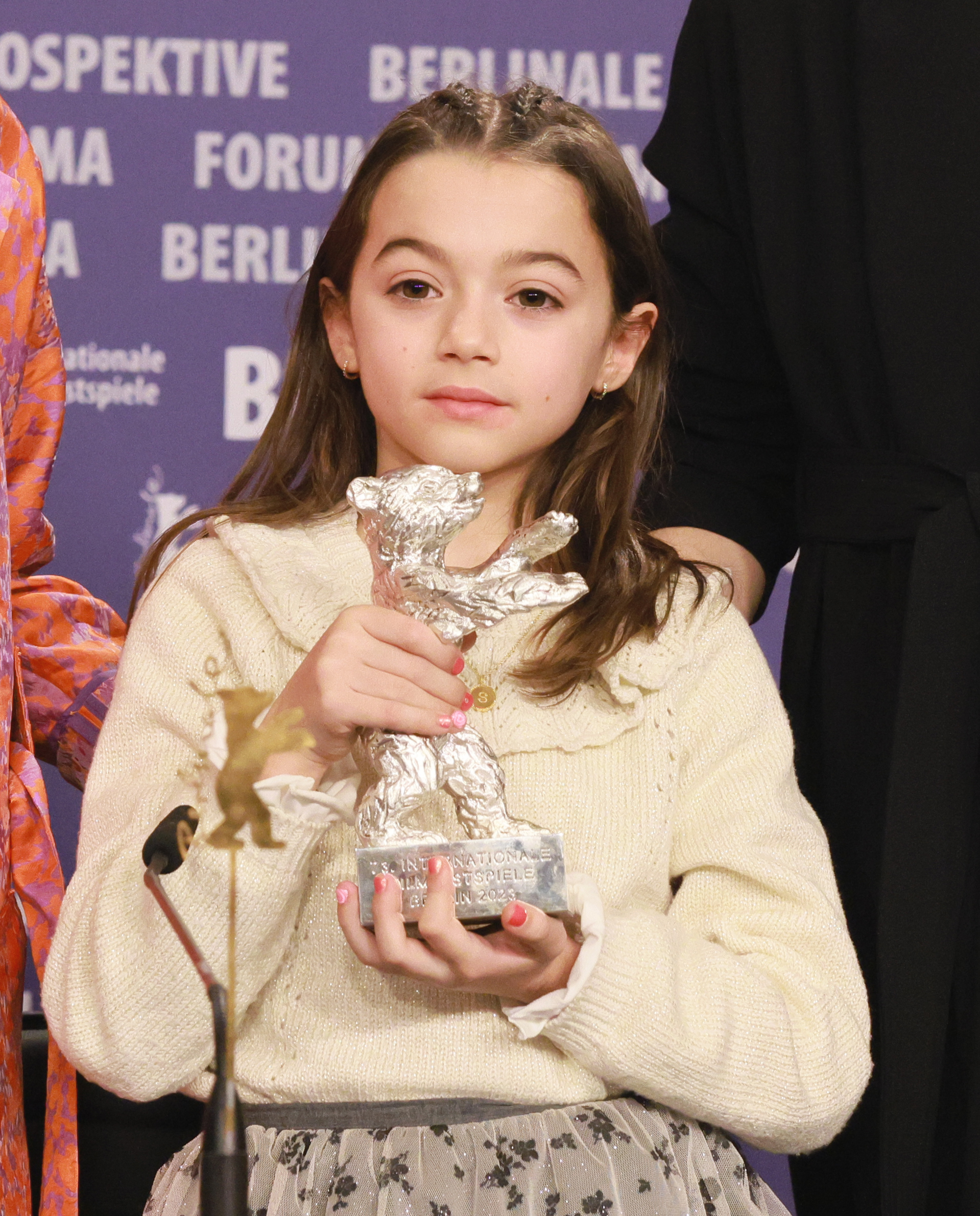
Sofía Otero, with the Silver Bear for Best Leading Performance for 20,000 Species of Bees

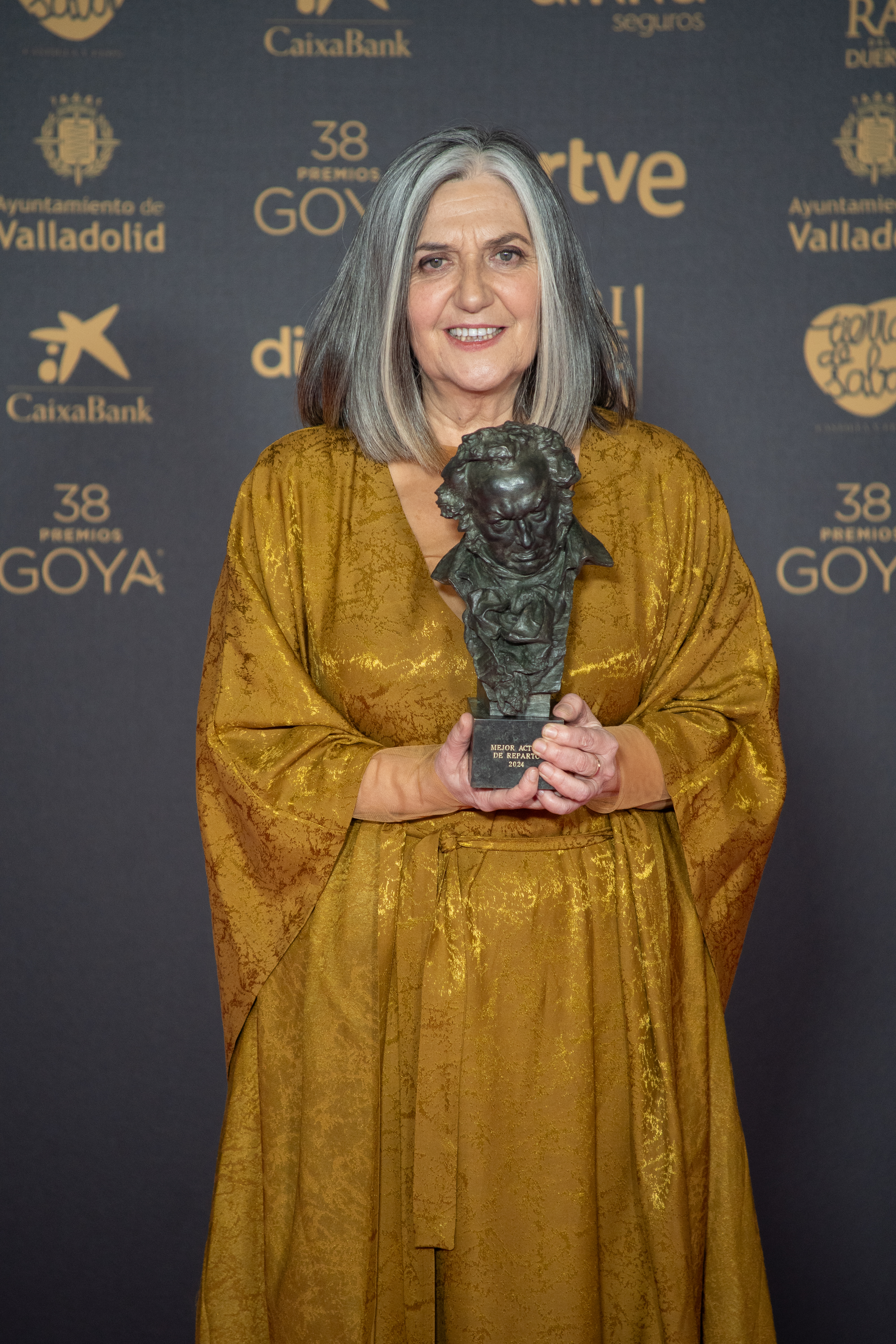
Ane Gabarain, with the Goya Award for Best Supporting Actress for 20,000 Species of Bees

Award	Date	Category	Recipient	Result	Ref.
Berlin International Film Festival	25 February 2023	Golden Bear	20,000 Species of Bees	Nominated	
Berlin International Film Festival	25 February 2023	Prize of the Guild of German Art House Cinemas	20,000 Species of Bees	Won	
Berlin International Film Festival	25 February 2023	Berliner Morgenpost Reader’s Jury Award	20,000 Species of Bees	Won	
Berlin International Film Festival	25 February 2023	GWFF Best First Feature Award	Estibaliz Urresola Solaguren	Nominated	
Berlin International Film Festival	25 February 2023	Teddy Award	20,000 Species of Bees	Nominated	
Berlin International Film Festival	25 February 2023	Silver Bear for Best Leading Performance	Sofía Otero	Won	
Málaga Film Festival	18 March 2023	Golden Biznaga for Best Spanish Film	20,000 Species of Bees	Won	
Málaga Film Festival	18 March 2023	Silver Biznaga for Best Supporting Actress	Patricia López Arnaiz	Won	
Hong Kong International Film Festival	9 April 2023	Best Actress – Young Cinema Competition (World)	Female ensemble cast	Won	
Seattle International Film Festival	21 May 2023	Official Competition Grand Jury Prize	20,000 Species of Bees	Won	
Guadalajara International Film Festival	9 June 2023	Iberoamerican Competition – Best Film	20,000 Species of Bees	Nominated	
Guadalajara International Film Festival	9 June 2023	Iberoamerican Competition – Best First Film	20,000 Species of Bees	Won	
Guadalajara International Film Festival	9 June 2023	Maguey Award	20,000 Species of Bees	Nominated	
Guadalajara International Film Festival	9 June 2023	Iberoamerican Competition – Best Directing	Estibaliz Urresola Solaguren	Won	
Guadalajara International Film Festival	9 June 2023	Maguey Award for Best Performance	Female ensamble cast	Won	
Jerusalem Film Festival	23 July 2023	Best International Debut	20,000 Species of Bees	Nominated	
Calgary International Film Festival	25 September 2023	Special Jury Citation for Direction, International Narrative Feature Competition	Estibaliz Urresola Solaguren	Won	
San Sebastián International Film Festival	30 September 2023	Sebastiane Award	20,000 Species of Bees	Won	
Athens International Film Festival	9 October 2023	Best Picture	20,000 Species of Bees	Nominated	
Athens International Film Festival	9 October 2023	Best Director	Estibaliz Urresola Solaguren	Won	
Hamptons International Film Festival	15 October 2023	Narrative Feature	20,000 Species of Bees	Won	
European Film Awards	9 December 2023	European Discovery – Prix FIPRESCI	Estibaliz Urresola Solaguren	Nominated	
European Film Awards	9 December 2023	European Film Academy Lux Award	20,000 Species of Bees	Nominated	
Forqué Awards	16 December 2023	Best Film	20,000 Species of Bees	Won	
Forqué Awards	16 December 2023	Cinema and Education in Values	20,000 Species of Bees	Won	
Feroz Awards	26 January 2024	Best Drama Film	20,000 Species of Bees	Won	
Feroz Awards	26 January 2024	Best Director	Estibaliz Urresola	Nominated	
Feroz Awards	26 January 2024	Best Screenplay	Estibaliz Urresola	Nominated	
Feroz Awards	26 January 2024	Best Trailer	Liviu Neagoe	Nominated	
Feroz Awards	26 January 2024	Best Film Poster	Cristina Hernández Bernardo	Nominated	
Feroz Awards	26 January 2024	Best Supporting Actress	Patricia López Arnaiz	Won	
Feroz Awards	26 January 2024	Best Supporting Actress	Ane Gabarain	Nominated	
Carmen Awards	3 February 2024	Best Non-Andalusian Produced Film	20,000 Species of Bees	Nominated	
Gaudí Awards	4 February 2024	Best Non-Catalan Language Film	20,000 Species of Bees	Won	
Gaudí Awards	4 February 2024	Best New Director	Estibaliz Urresola Solaguren	Won	
Gaudí Awards	4 February 2024	Best Original Screenplay	Estibaliz Urresola Solaguren	Nominated	
Gaudí Awards	4 February 2024	Best Actress	Patricia López Arnaiz	Nominated	
Gaudí Awards	4 February 2024	Best Supporting Actress	Ane Gabarain	Nominated	
Gaudí Awards	4 February 2024	Best Cinematography	Gina Ferrer	Won	
Gaudí Awards	4 February 2024	Best Editing	Raúl Barreras	Nominated	
Gaudí Awards	4 February 2024	Best Art Direction	Izaskun Urkijo Alijo	Nominated	
Gaudí Awards	4 February 2024	Best Sound	Eva Valiño, Koldo Corella, Xanti Salvador	Nominated	
CEC Medals	5 February 2024	Best Film	20,000 Species of Bees	Nominated	
CEC Medals	5 February 2024	Best New Director	Estibaliz Urresola Solaguren	Won	
CEC Medals	5 February 2024	Best Original Screenplay	Estibaliz Urresola Solaguren	Nominated	
CEC Medals	5 February 2024	Best Actress	Patricia López Arnaiz	Nominated	
CEC Medals	5 February 2024	Best Supporting Actress	Ana Gabarain	Nominated	
CEC Medals	5 February 2024	Best Cinematography	Gina Ferrer García	Nominated	
CEC Medals	5 February 2024	Best Editing	Raúl Barreras	Nominated	
Goya Awards	10 February 2024	Best Film	20,000 Species of Bees	Nominated	
Goya Awards	10 February 2024	Best New Director	Estibaliz Urresola Solaguren	Won	
Goya Awards	10 February 2024	Best Original Screenplay	Estibaliz Urresola Solaguren	Won	
Goya Awards	10 February 2024	Best Actress	Patricia López Arnaiz	Nominated	
Goya Awards	10 February 2024	Best Supporting Actress	Itziar Lazcano	Nominated	
Goya Awards	10 February 2024	Best Supporting Actress	Ane Gabarain	Won	
Goya Awards	10 February 2024	Best Supporting Actor	Martxelo Rubio	Nominated	
Goya Awards	10 February 2024	Best Cinematography	Gina Ferrer García	Nominated	
Goya Awards	10 February 2024	Best Editing	Raúl Barreras	Nominated	
Goya Awards	10 February 2024	Best Sound	Eva Valiño, Koldo Corella, Xanti Salvador	Nominated	
Goya Awards	10 February 2024	Best Art Direction	Izaskun Urkijo	Nominated	
Goya Awards	10 February 2024	Best Production Supervision	Pablo Vidal	Nominated	
Goya Awards	10 February 2024	Best Costume Design	Nerea Torrijos	Nominated	
Goya Awards	10 February 2024	Best Makeup and Hairstyles	Ainhoa Eskisabel, Jone Gabarain	Nominated	
Goya Awards	10 February 2024	Best Special Effects	Mariano García Marty, Jon Serrano, David Heras, Fran Belda, Indira Martín	Nominated	
Actors and Actresses Union Awards	11 March 2024	Best Film Actress in a Secondary Role	Ane Gabarain	Won	
ALMA Awards	20 March 2024	Best Screenplay in a Drama Film	Estibaliz Urresola	Nominated	
Platino Awards	20 April 2024	Best Ibero-American Debut Film	20,000 Species of Bees	Won	
Platino Awards	20 April 2024	Best Screenplay	Estibaliz Urresola	Won	
Platino Awards	20 April 2024	Best Supporting Actress	Ane Gabarain	Won	
Platino Awards	20 April 2024	Film and Values Education	20,000 Species of Bees	Won	
GLAAD Media Awards	27 March 2025	Outstanding Film – Limited Release	20,000 Species of Bees	Nominated	

=== Listicle ===
Publisher	Year	Listicle	Placement	Ref.
Screen International	2023	15 films that stood out at Berlin 2023	1st	

== See also ==
- List of Spanish films of 2023
