= Upon Entry =

- Theatrical release poster
- Spanish: Upon Entry (La llegada)
- Directed by: Alejandro Rojas; Juan Sebastián Vásquez
- Screenplay by: Alejandro Rojas; Juan Sebastián Vásquez
- Produced by: Carles Torras; Carlos Juárez; Xosé Zapata; Sergio Adrià; Alba Sotorra
- Starring: Alberto Ammann; Bruna Cusí; Ben Temple; Laura Gómez
- Cinematography: Juan Sebastián Vásquez
- Edited by: Emanuele Tiziani
- Production companies: Zabriskie Films; Basque Films; Sygnatia
- Distributed by: Karma Films
- Release dates: November 2022 (PÖFF); 16 June 2023 (Spain)
- Country: Spain
- Languages: Spanish; English; Catalan

Upon Entry (released as Upon Entry (La llegada) in Spain) is a 2022 Spanish drama film directed by Alejandro Rojas and Juan Sebastián Vásquez (in their directorial debut feature). It stars Alberto Ammann and Bruna Cusí alongside Ben Temple and Laura Gómez.

The plot concerns the unpleasant vetting and questioning procedures that the couple Diego (a Venezuelan urbanist) and Elena (a contemporary dancer from Barcelona) suffers at the Newark Airport upon moving from Barcelona to the United States to start off a new life.

== Plot ==
Diego (a Venezuelan urbanist) and Elena (a Barcelona dancer) fly to the United States together, as she has won a Green Card Lottery visa and they are a pareja de hecho or common-law couple. Both are nervously excited to start their new life together.

Arriving at Newark Airport passport control, as the nervous Diego misplaced the I-9 Declaration form, Elena fills out another. Watching the available agents, as one appears to let people through more quickly, Diego is pleased they get him.

However, after scanning their passports, the agent fingerprints them and takes their photos before escourting them to a secondary inspection area. Both are concerned, but when they mention their connecting flight to Miami, it does not speed up the process.

After 30 minutes the couple are asked to sit and wait more. As she had not eaten on the plane, Elena asks if there is food or water available, but is told no. Diego discourages her from asking more questions, as he fears they will have problems if they appear difficult.

Brought into a small interrogation room, their bags are thoroughly searched again. When asked to turn off and lock away his phone, Diego resists slightly as he had planned to see his brother in New York before continuing to Florida. However, the agent suggests time constraints could make that difficult.

A drug-sniffing dog goes over them and their luggage. Then they both are given thorough body searches, and the agent bags some of Elena's insulin and a needle. The couple are left alone to await their interview. Once alone, Elena is indignant about the search, unaware it was a possibility. Diego wonders if they are being watched.

A female agent enters, and one by one asks for a series of documents, social media account information, again about birth dates. Elena voices her annoyance to Diego in Spanish, to which the agent responds in perfect Spanish and suggests they answer truthfully as lying is considered a criminal offense.

When asked if they have another nationality, Diego says he is a Spanish resident through Elena, as his partner. The agent points out he should have waited for his Spanish nationality acceptance before travelling. Diego explains they needed to come before Elena's Diversity visa expired. The agent then confirms he had applied on two previous occasions unsuccessfully. Diego also has other family members who were unsuccessful at getting the visa.

When asked why theirs is a civil union and not a marriage, they indicate they do not see it necessary. They are interrogated about work, to give specifics as to their experience and why they specifically chose the US, rather than another EU country etc. Elena asks why they are repeating the same questions as those in the embassy, she is told they are checking due to new info they received.

As the interview goes on, Diego is further prodded, as he was in the US four years ago, and also in a similar secondary interview. He admits her questions are making him nervous. The agent asks Diego about Kate, a Miami woman he had met online ten years his senior, with which he had almost entered the US on a fiancé visa with. Elena has no knowledge of her and is upset to learn he broke it off with Kate after meeting her.

Diego is then interviewed by two agents. She tries to get him to admit he is only out to get his green card, under threat of deporting him to Venezuela, where he once had been kidnapped by the authorities. Elena is next barraged with questions, and they make her realise how little she would see her family. Also, she is reminded that when they have kids, their upkeep is expensive. They plant doubt about Diego's intentions, then the male agent tries to force Elena to prove she can dance.

Returning to the waiting room, Diego can see Elena has been crying. She says she just wants to return to Barcelona. They both realize they gave different answers about her knowledge of his former engagement. Called up to the desk, after realizing they missed the flight to Miami, they are surprised to be welcomed to the US.

== Cast ==
- Alberto Ammann as Diego
- Bruna Cusí as Elena
- Ben Temple as Agent Barrett
- Laura Gómez as Agent Vasquez

== Production ==
Written and directed by Venezuelan filmmakers Alejandro Rojas and Juan Sebastián Vásquez, Upon Entry is based on the helmers' personal experiences as immigrants. The film is a Spanish co-production by Zabriskie Films, Basque Films, and Sygnatia, with the participation of TV3, and the support from ICEC, the Madrid regional administration, the Basque Government and Creative Europe's MEDIA.

== Release ==
Upon Entry screened at the Tallinn Black Nights Film Festival (PÖFF) in November 2022. It also made it to the official selection of the 28th Kolkata International Film Festival. It was picked up by Charades and Anonymous Content ahead of its screening at the South by Southwest (SXSW) for its North-American premiere. It also received screenings at the 26th Málaga Film Festival and BAFICI. Distributed by Karma Films, it was released theatrically in Spain on 16 June 2023.

Charades closed distribution deals in Italy (Exit Media), Japan (Shochiku), Portugal (Alambique), India (PictureWorks), CIS (Pionier), and France (Condor Distribution).

== Reception ==
According to the American review aggregation website Rotten Tomatoes, Upon Entry has a 100% approval rating based on 11 reviews from critics, with an average rating of 8.0/10.

Júlia Olmo of Cineuropa assessed that despite the film seemingly touching towards its end upon the clichés it managed to steer clear of before, it "manages to be an enjoyable film", "to achieve its verisimilitude and to make us forget for a while" "that we are watching a fictional film".

Jonathan Holland of ScreenDaily considered that the film "plays out in that grey zone where legitimate questioning ends and the state torture manual begins", pointing out how generating "so much drama from what is basically 74 minutes of people talking across a table at one another is very clever film making indeed".

Jordi Batlle Caminal of Fotogramas rated the film 4 out of 5 stars, highlighting the entire cast as the best thing about the film.

=== Top ten lists ===
The film appeared on a number of critics' top ten lists of the best Spanish films of 2023:

- 1st — Mondosonoro (consensus)
- 2nd — El Cultural (critics)
- 7th — El Periódico de Catalunya (critics)
- 8th — El Español (Series & Más consensus)
- 10th — El Confidencial (consensus)

=== Accolades ===
Year	Award	Category	Nominee(s)	Result	Ref.
2022	26th Tallinn Black Nights Film Festival	FIPRESCI Award		Won	
2022	28th Kolkata International Film Festival	Golden Bengal Royal Tiger Award for Best Film		Won	
2023	26th Málaga Film Festival	Silver Biznaga for Best Actor	Alberto Ammann	Won	
2023	23rd Golden Trailer Awards	Best Independent Trailer (for film budget shot under $1.5Million US)	Upon Entry (ZEALOT)	Won	
2023	29th Forqué Awards	Best Film		Nominated	
2023	29th Forqué Awards	Best Actor in a Film	Alberto Ammann	Nominated	
2024	11th Feroz Awards	Best Drama Film		Nominated	
2024	11th Feroz Awards	Best Actor in a Film	Alberto Ammann	Nominated	
2024	11th Feroz Awards	Best Screenplay	Alejandro Rojas, Juan Sebastián Vásquez	Won	
2024	16th Gaudí Awards	Best Non-Catalan Language Film		Nominated	
2024	16th Gaudí Awards	Best New Director	Juan Sebastián Vásquez, Alejandro Rojas	Nominated	
2024	16th Gaudí Awards	Best Original Screenplay	Juan Sebastián Vásquez, Alejandro Rojas	Won	
2024	16th Gaudí Awards	Best Actress	Bruna Cusí	Nominated	
2024	16th Gaudí Awards	Best Actor	Alberto Ammann	Nominated	
2024	79th CEC Medals	Best New Director	Alejandro Rojas, Juan Sebastián Vasquez	Nominated	
2024	79th CEC Medals	Best Original Screenplay	Alejandro Rojas, Juan Sebastián Vasquez	Nominated	
2024	38th Goya Awards	Best Actor	Alberto Ammann	Nominated	
2024	38th Goya Awards	Best New Director	Alejandro Rojas, Juan Sebastián Vásquez	Nominated	
2024	38th Goya Awards	Best Original Screenplay	Alejandro Rojas, Juan Sebastián Vásquez	Nominated	
2024	39th Independent Spirit Awards	Best First Feature		Nominated	
2024	39th Independent Spirit Awards	Best First Screenplay	Alejandro Rojas, Juan Sebastián Vásquez	Nominated	
2024	39th Independent Spirit Awards	Best Editing	Emanuele Tiziani	Nominated	
2024	32nd Actors and Actresses Union Awards	Best Film Actor in a Leading Role	Alberto Ammann	Nominated	
2024	7th ALMA Awards	Best Screenplay in a Drama Film	Alejandro Rojas, Juan Sebastián Vásquez	Won	

== See also ==
- List of Spanish films of 2023
