= Close Your Eyes (2023 film) =

- Film poster
- Spanish: Cerrar los ojos
- Directed by: Víctor Erice
- Screenplay by: Víctor Erice; Michel Gaztambide
- Story by: Víctor Erice
- Produced by: Cristina Zumárraga; Pablo E. Bossi; Víctor Erice; Jose Alba; Odile Antonio-Baez; Pol Bossi; Maximiliano Lasansky
- Starring: Manolo Solo; Jose Coronado; Ana Torrent; Petra Martínez; María León; Mario Pardo; Helena Miquel; Antonio Dechent; Venecia Franco; José María Pou; Soledad Villamil; Juan Margallo
- Cinematography: Valentín Álvarez
- Edited by: Ascen Marchena
- Music by: Federico Jusid
- Production companies: La Mirada del Adiós AIE; Tandem Films; Nautilus Films; Pecado Films; Pampa Films
- Distributed by: Avalon (es)
- Release dates: 22 May 2023 (Cannes); 29 September 2023 (Spain)
- Running time: 169 minutes
- Countries: Spain; Argentina
- Language: Spanish
- Box office: $778,804

Close Your Eyes (Spanish: Cerrar los ojos) is a 2023 drama film directed by Víctor Erice from a screenplay by Erice and Michel Gaztambide which stars Manolo Solo, José Coronado, and Ana Torrent. It is a Spanish-Argentine co-production.

The film had its world premiere in the Cannes Premiere section of the 76th Cannes Film Festival on 22 May 2023. It was released theatrically in Spain on 29 September 2023 by Avalon.

== Plot ==
In 2012, about twenty years after the mysterious disappearance of actor Julio Arenas on the seacoast while shooting a film titled The Farewell Gaze in the 1990s, a sensationalist television show revives the case, coming to involve film director and Arenas's close friend Miguel Garay, who talks to Julio's daughter Ana, the movie's editor and archivist Max, and mutual friend and lover Lola.

== Cast ==
- Manolo Solo as Miguel Garay
- José Coronado as Julio Arenas / Gardel
- Ana Torrent as Ana Arenas
- María León as Belén Granados
- Petra Martínez as Sister Consuelo
- Soledad Villamil as Lola San Román
- Antonio Dechent as Tico Mayoral
- Mario Pardo as Max Roca
- Helena Miquel as Marta Soriano
- José María Pou as Ferrán Soler (Mr. Levy)
- Juan Margallo as Doctor Benavides
- Venecia Franco as Qiao Shu

== Production ==
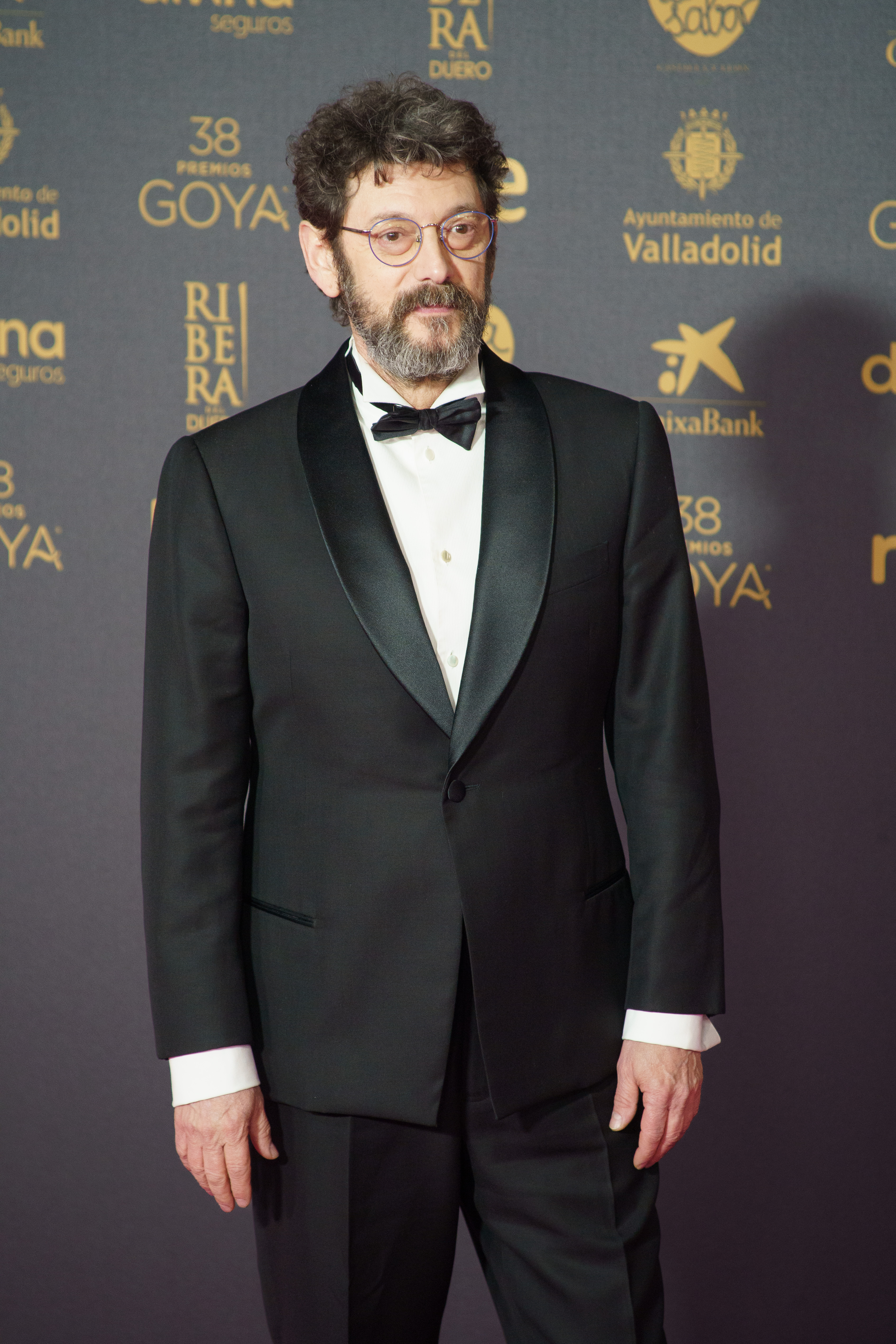
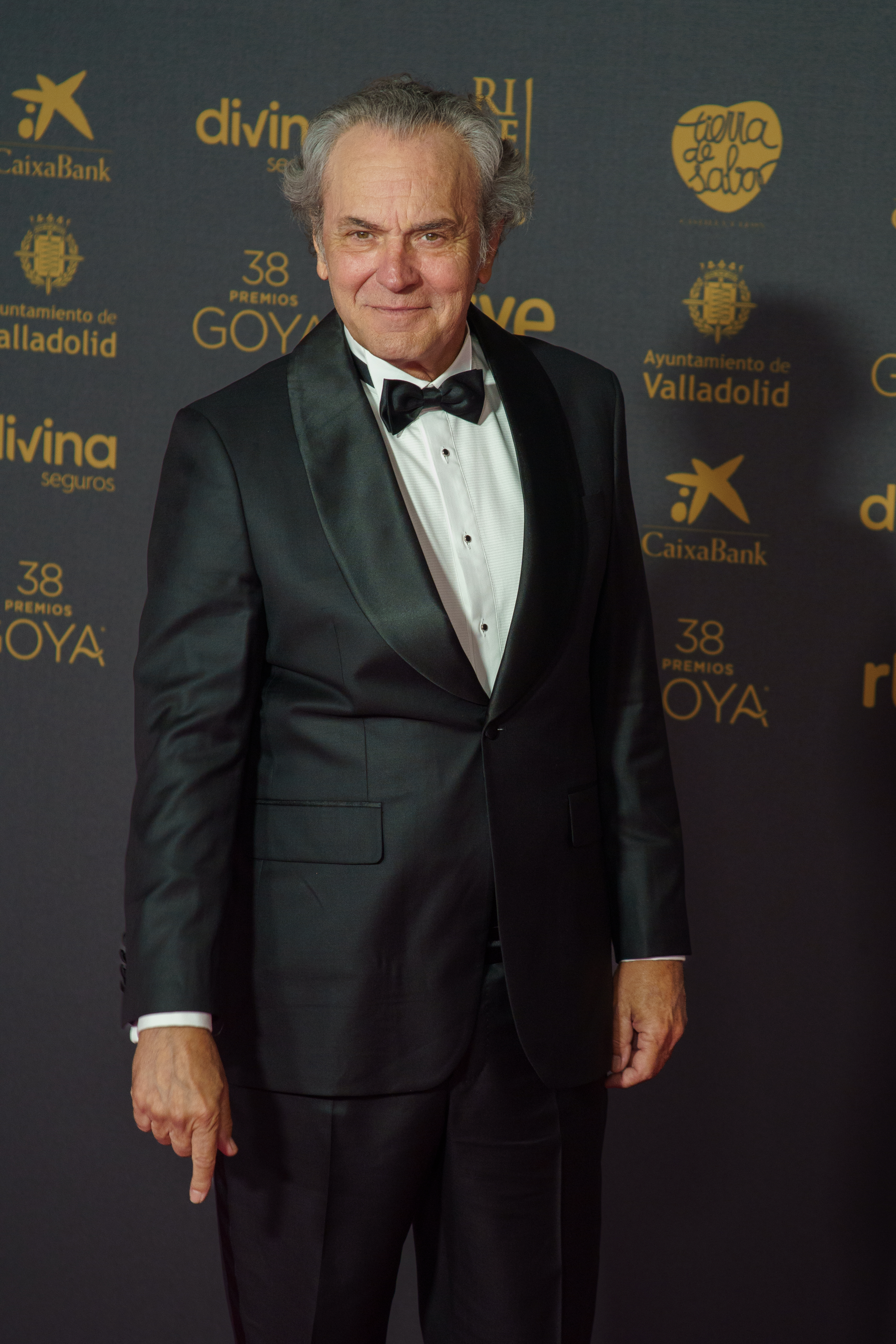
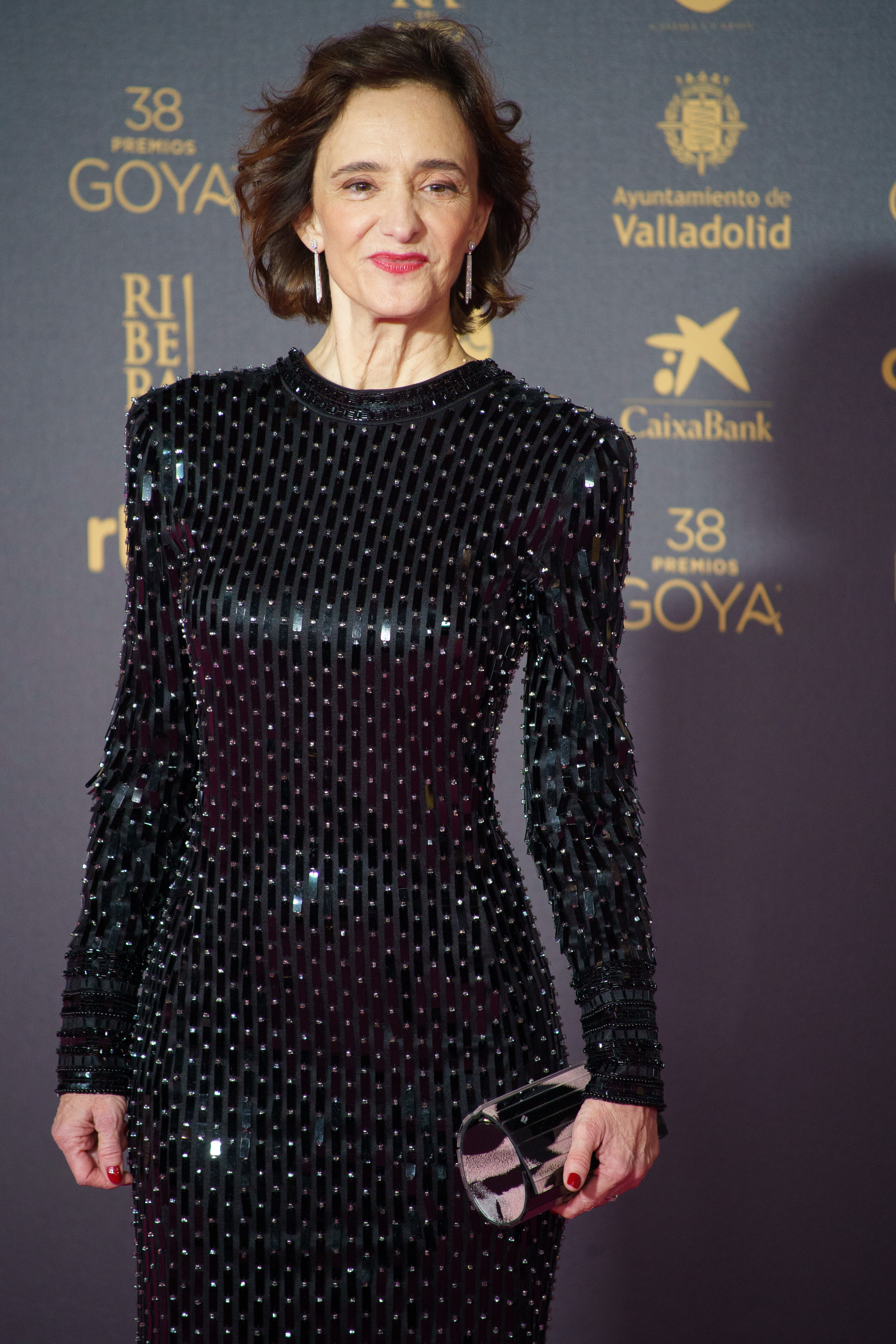
Cast members Solo, Coronado, and Torrent attending the 2024 Goya Awards

The project was Erice's first full-length film since his 1992 documentary The Quince Tree Sun and was revealed upon the disclosure of the allocation of public funding to the film's production by Andalusian regional broadcaster Canal Sur in mid-2022. The screenplay was penned by Víctor Erice and Michel Gaztambide based on an original story by Erice. The film was a co-production between Pecado Films, Tandem Films, Nautilus Films, Pampa Films and La voz del adiós AIE, with the participation of RTVE, Canal Sur, Vodafone, EiTB, Movistar Plus+, Telemadrid, and support from ICAA, Andalusia and Madrid regional administrations, and Diputación de Granada.

Shooting locations included Castell de Ferro and Gualchos (province of Granada) and Aguadulce (province of Almería), as well as Asturias and Madrid.

== Release ==
The film was selected to be screened in the Cannes Premiere section of the 76th Cannes Film Festival, where it had its world premiere on 22 May 2023. Erice declined to attend the premiere, explaining his absence in an open letter sent to El País on the basis of a reported lack of "dialogue and consultation" on the part of the festival's programming director Thierry Frémaux during the selection process. Having submitted a QuickTime format version of the film in March 2023 and later a DCP with the final color grading and sound mixes, Erice reportedly knew about the Cannes Premiere slate during the official press conference on the morning of 13 April 2023, with Frémaux reportedly ignoring Erice and failing to notify him in due time whether the film would be entered into an official selection's competition slot, thus leaving Erice no time to consider other screening alternatives for Close Your Eyes, including an opening of Cannes' parallel section Directors' Fortnight, and screenings in Locarno and Venice. The Cannes festival's administration issued a statement in response claiming that the selection of the film took place under usual conditions, explaining that they were "above all proud and happy to have welcomed Close Your Eyes by Víctor Erice to its 76th edition".

The film also made it to the "Centrepiece" programme of the 2023 Toronto International Film Festival, to the "Icon" section of the 28th Busan International Film Festival, to the "Create" section of the 2023 BFI London Film Festival, and to the main slate of the 2023 New York Film Festival.

Haut et Court acquired distribution rights in France, where its theatrical release date was set for 16 August 2023. New Wave Films acquired distribution rights in the United Kingdom and Ireland. Distributed by Avalon, the film was released theatrically in Spain on 29 September 2023. It was released on Movistar Plus+ on 8 February 2024. Film Movement acquired North American distribution rights in April 2024; a theatrical run starting on 23 August 2024 was planned in New York and Los Angeles with digital and home entertainment releases to follow.

On 7 September 2023, ahead of its Spanish theatrical premiere, the film was announced to be on the shortlist for Spain's submission to the 96th Academy Awards for Best International Feature Film, competing with 20,000 Species of Bees, and Society of the Snow.

== Reception ==
=== Critical response ===
On the review aggregator website Rotten Tomatoes, 93% of 74 critics' reviews are positive, with an average rating of 8.8/10. The website's consensus reads: "A near-masterpiece for director/co-writer Victor Erice, Close Your Eyes ends his long gap between films with a moving meditation on memory, identity, and cinema itself." Metacritic, which uses a weighted average, assigned the film a score of 85 out of 100, based on 22 critics, indicating "universal acclaim".

Manu Yáñez of Fotogramas rated Close Your Eyes 5 out of 5 stars, highlighting the final stretch of the story as the best thing about the film.

Jordan Mintzer of The Hollywood Reporter underscored the film to be "a poignant cinematic swan song". Peter Bradshaw of The Guardian rated the film 4 out of 5 stars describing it as "expansive, garrulous and yet also downbeat and pessimistic", considering that "there is something deeply civilised and gentle about this film".

Justin Chang of The New Yorker wrote that the film "has its own warm spirit of optimism but, happily, none of the self-regarding solipsism you might fear from such a personal valentine to cinema". Chang also chose the movie as his number one pick on his list of The Best Films of 2024 for The New Yorker magazine and for National Public Radio's "Fresh Air" program.

Daniel de Partearroyo of Cinemanía rated the film 4½ out of 5 stars, stressing in the verdict "the return of the king", and how Erice "is awe-inspiring with his gaze from another time". In January 2024, the American National Society of Film Critics signalled Close Your Eyes in a "special citation for a film awaiting U.S. distribution".

=== Top ten lists ===
The film was listed by several critics amongst the top 10 best films of 2023:

- 1st — Esquire (Rafael Sánchez Casademont)
- 2nd — Cahiers du Cinéma (consensus)

The film also appeared on a number of critics' top 10 lists of the best Spanish films of 2023:

- 1st — El Cultural (critics)
- 3rd — El Mundo (Luis Martínez)
- 7th — El Español (Series & Más consensus)

=== Accolades ===
Year	Award	Category	Nominee(s)	Result	Ref.
2023	29th Forqué Awards	Best Film		Nominated	
2023	29th Forqué Awards	Best Actor in a Film	Manolo Solo	Nominated	
2024	11th Feroz Awards	Best Drama Film		Nominated	
2024	11th Feroz Awards	Best Director	Víctor Erice	Nominated	
2024	11th Feroz Awards	Best Screenplay	Víctor Erice, Michel Gaztambide	Nominated	
2024	11th Feroz Awards	Best Actor in a Film	Manolo Solo	Nominated	
2024	11th Feroz Awards	Best Supporting Actress in a Film	Ana Torrent	Nominated	
2024	11th Feroz Awards	Best Supporting Actor in a Film	José Coronado	Nominated	
2024	11th Feroz Awards	Best Original Soundtrack	Federico Jusid	Nominated	
2024	11th Feroz Awards	Best Poster	Sergio Pozas, Manolo Pavón	Nominated	
2024	11th Feroz Awards	Best Trailer	Elena Gutiérrez	Nominated	
2024	3rd Carmen Awards	Best Film		Won	
2024	3rd Carmen Awards	Best Actor	Manolo Solo	Nominated	
2024	3rd Carmen Awards	Best Supporting Actress	María León	Nominated	
2024	3rd Carmen Awards	Best Supporting Actress	Petra Martínez	Nominated	
2024	79th CEC Medals	Best Film		Nominated	
2024	79th CEC Medals	Best Director	Víctor Erice	Won	
2024	79th CEC Medals	Best Original Screenplay	Michel Gaztambide, Víctor Erice	Won	
2024	79th CEC Medals	Best Actor	Manolo Solo	Nominated	
2024	79th CEC Medals	Best Supporting Actor	José Coronado	Won	
2024	79th CEC Medals	Best Supporting Actor	José María Pou	Nominated	
2024	79th CEC Medals	Best Supporting Actor	Mario Pardo	Nominated	
2024	79th CEC Medals	Best Supporting Actress	Ana Torrent	Won	
2024	79th CEC Medals	Best New Actress	Venecia Franco	Nominated	
2024	79th CEC Medals	Best Cinematography	Valentín Álvarez	Nominated	
2024	79th CEC Medals	Best Editing	Ascen Marchena	Nominated	
2024	79th CEC Medals	Best Music	Federico Jusid	Nominated	
2024	38th Goya Awards	Best Film		Nominated	
2024	38th Goya Awards	Best Director	Víctor Erice	Nominated	
2024	38th Goya Awards	Best Original Screenplay	Víctor Erice, Michel Gaztambide	Nominated	
2024	38th Goya Awards	Best Actor	Manolo Solo	Nominated	
2024	38th Goya Awards	Best Supporting Actress	Ana Torrent	Nominated	
2024	38th Goya Awards	Best Supporting Actor	José Coronado	Won	
2024	38th Goya Awards	Best Cinematography	Valentín Álvarez	Nominated	
2024	38th Goya Awards	Best Editing	Ascen Marchena	Nominated	
2024	38th Goya Awards	Best Sound	Iván Marín, Juan Ferro, Candela Palencia	Nominated	
2024	38th Goya Awards	Best Art Direction	Curru Garabal	Nominated	
2024	38th Goya Awards	Best Production Supervision	María José Díez	Nominated	
2024	32nd Actors and Actresses Union Awards	Best Film Actor in a Leading Role	Manolo Solo	Nominated	
2024	32nd Actors and Actresses Union Awards	Best Film Actor in a Secondary Role	José Coronado	Nominated	
2024	11th Platino Awards	Best Ibero-American Film		Nominated	
2024	11th Platino Awards	Best Screenplay	Michel Gaztambide, Víctor Erice	Nominated	
2024	11th Platino Awards	Best Supporting Actor	José Coronado	Won	
2024	11th Platino Awards	Best Supporting Actress	Ana Torrent	Nominated	
2024	11th Platino Awards	Best Cinematography	Valentín Álvarez	Nominated	
2024	11th Platino Awards	Best Art Direction	Curru Garabal	Nominated	

== See also ==
- List of Spanish films of 2023
