= 7th ALMA Awards (Spain) =

- Date: 20 March 2024
- Venue: Teatros Luchana, Madrid
- Presented by: ALMA
- Hosted by: Yaiza Nuevo; Javi Valera

The 7th ALMA Awards ceremony, presented by ALMA, the screenwriters' union of Spain, was held on 20 March 2024 at the Teatros Luchana in Madrid. The gala was written and hosted by Yaiza Nuevo and Javi Valera.

The committee of the Writers Guild of America responsible for negotiating in the 2023 Writers Guild of America strike was awarded the ALMA Honorary Award.

== Winners and nominees ==
The winners and nominees are listed as follows:

Best Screenplay in a Feature Film (Drama): Alejandro Rojas, Juan Sebastián Vásquez — Upon Entry; Estibaliz Urresola — 20,000 Species of Bees; J.A. Bayona, Nicolás Casariego, Jaime Marqués Olarreaga, Bernat Vilaplana — Society of the Snow	Best Screenplay in a Feature Film (Comedy): Pablo Berger — Robot Dreams; Itsaso Arana — The Girls Are Alright; Félix Viscarret — Not Such an Easy Life
Best Screenplay in a Series (Drama): Javier Ambrossi, Javier Calvo, Carmen Jiménez, Nacho Vigalondo — La mesías; Jacobo Delgado, Ignacio del Moral, Manu Dios, Joaquín Oristrell, Sonia Sánchez, Curro Royo — Cuéntame cómo pasó; Laura Sarmiento, Carlos López, José Luis Martín, Eduard Sola — Burning Body	Best Screenplay in a Series (Comedy): Pepón Montero, Juan Maidagán — Little Faith; Berto Romero, Rafel Barceló, Enric Pardo — The Other Side; Aina Clotet, Dani González, Valentina Viso — This Is Not Sweden
Best Screenplay in a Feature Film (Documentary): Santos Bacana, Rogelio González, Cris Tenas — This Excessive Ambition; Ana Ramón Rubio — Bull Run; Carlota Nelson — Cristina García Rodero: la mirada oculta; Adriá Attardi, Júlia Badenes, Jordi Évole, Màrius Sánchez, Silvia Merino — No me llame Ternera	Best Screenplay in a Game Show: Marisa Pérez, Lourdes Alegre, Aram Bonmatí, Armonía Gustems, Jesús Martínez, Marc Montañés, Marina Ortuño, Albert París, Laia Poo, Mireia Pou, Júlia Puig, Crisol Tuà, Mireia Ubero, Mireia Uribesalgo — Saber y ganar
Best Screenplay in a Daily Series: Pablo Fajardo, Verónica Viñé, Ángel Agudo, Ariana Martín Carmassi, Beatriz Duque, Bárbara Alpuente, Julia Altares, Casandra Balbás, Juan Carlos Blázquez, Óscar Corredor, Mercedes Cruz, Covadonga Espeso, Miriam García Montero, Matías García, Ángeles González Sinde, David Méndez, María José Mochales, David Paniagua de Paz, Juanjo Ramírez Mascaró, Olga Salvador, Itziar Sanjuán, Macu Tejera, Virginia Yagüe — Amar es para siempre	Best Screenplay in a Show: Eduardo García Eyo, David Navas, David Dato, Iratxe Fernández de Velasco, Lucas Fuentes, Manuel Gay, Olalla Granja, Yaiza Nuevo, Alberto P. Castaños, Carlos Pérez Uribe, Carles Sánchez, Diego Saucedo, Jesús Torres, Mikel Uribe-Etxebarria, Irene Varela — El Intermedio
