= Bakugan Battle Brawlers: Battle Trainer =

2010 video game

- Publisher: Activision
- Platform: Nintendo DS
- Release: March 2010
- Genre: Strategy
- Mode: Single-player

Bakugan Battle Brawlers: Battle Trainer is a 2010 video game from Activision for the Nintendo DS. It is based on the Bakugan franchise.

== Gameplay ==
Bakugan Battle Trainer follows Dan as he travels into space after an alien arrives on Earth and steals every Bakugan. Each battle allows him to reclaim one creature. Combat is straightforward: the player selects a Bakugan, or a team of up to three, and it automatically fights the opponent's creature. Between battles, the Bakugan stay in an arena on Earth where the player can interact with them to raise their mental abilities. Training takes place through touch‑screen minigames, such as flicking a Bakugan through a maze or guiding it along a track to avoid obstacles. Completing these sessions increases its G‑power and grants power‑ups. Each Bakugan can equip several power‑ups, which function like single‑use cards that provide stat boosts or situational advantages depending on the enemy or arena.

== Development ==
Bakugan Battle Brawlers: Battle Trainer was announced for a spring 2010 release.

== Reception ==
Reception

Review scores
Publication	Score
Kidz World	2/5
Newsday	3/5
Nintendo Gamer	58%
Vandal	4/5

Battle Trainer received "generally unfavorable reviews" according to Metacritic.

Kidz World recommended Battle Trainer to Bakugan fans only. Newsday called the game repetitive.
