= Burning Body =

Spanish crime television miniseries

- Promotional release poster
- Spanish: El cuerpo en llamas
- Written by: Laura Sarmiento
- Directed by: Jorge Torregrossa; Laura Mañá
- Starring: Úrsula Corberó; Quim Gutiérrez; José Manuel Poga; Isak Férriz
- Country of origin: Spain
- Original language: Spanish

Production
- Production company: Arcadia Motion Pictures

Original release
- Network: Netflix
- Release: 8 September 2023

Burning Body (Spanish: El cuerpo en llamas) is a 2023 Spanish crime television miniseries written by Laura Sarmiento and directed by Jorge Torregrossa and Laura Mañá. It stars Úrsula Corberó, Quim Gutiérrez, and José Manuel Poga.

== Plot ==
Set in 2017, the plot is a fictionalisation of the real Crime of the Guàrdia Urbana. When the burned body of Pedro, a cop, is found in the Foix Reservoir near Barcelona, the plot delves into the tangle of toxic relationships, cheating, violence and sex scandals involving Pedro and two fellow agents (Rosa and Albert).

== Cast ==
- Úrsula Corberó as Rosa
- Eva Llorach as Ester
- Quim Gutiérrez as Albert
- Raúl Prieto as Manu
- Isak Férriz as Javi
- José Manuel Poga as Pedro
- Guiomar Caiado as Sofía
- Sergi Cervera as Néstor
- Bruno Sevilla as Álvaro
- Aina Clotet as Silvia
- Aleida Torrent as Vanesa

== Production ==
Burning Body is an Arcadia Motion Pictures production. Shooting lasted from September to October 2022 and it took place in Barcelona.

== Release ==
The limited series debuted on Netflix on 8 September 2023.

== Awards ==
Year	Award	Category	Nominee(s)	Result	Ref.
2023	70th Ondas Awards	Best Television Actress	Úrsula Corberó	Won	
2023	29th Forqué Awards	Best TV Series		Nominated	
2023	29th Forqué Awards	Best Actress in a TV Series	Úrsula Corberó	Nominated	
2024	11th Feroz Awards	Best Drama Series		Nominated	
2024	11th Feroz Awards	Best Screenplay in a Series	Laura Sarmiento, Eduard Sola, Carlos López, José Luis Martín	Nominated	
2024	11th Feroz Awards	Best Main Actress in a Series	Úrsula Corberó	Nominated	
2024	11th Feroz Awards	Best Main Actor in a Series	Quim Gutiérrez	Nominated	
2024	11th Feroz Awards	Best Supporting Actor in a Series	José Manuel Poga	Nominated	
2024	32nd Actors and Actresses Union Awards	Best Television Actress in a Leading Role	Ursula Corberó	Nominated	
2024	32nd Actors and Actresses Union Awards	Best Television Actor in a Leading Role	Quim Gutiérrez	Won	
2024	7th ALMA Awards	Best Screenplay in a Drama Series	Laura Sarmiento, Carlos López, José Luis Martín, Eduard Sola	Nominated	
2024	11th Platino Awards	Best Miniseries or TV Series		Nominated	
2024	11th Platino Awards	Best Actress in a Miniseries or TV Series	Úrsula Corberó	Nominated	
