= La mesías =

2023 Spanish TV series

- Promotional release poster
- Genre: Family thriller
- Created by: Javier Ambrossi; Javier Calvo
- Written by: Javier Ambrossi; Javier Calvo
- Directed by: Javier Ambrossi; Javier Calvo
- Starring: Macarena García; Roger Casamajor; Lola Dueñas; Ana Rujas; Carmen Machi; Albert Pla; Biel Rossell Pelfort; Irene Balmes; Bruno Núñez; Carla Moral; Iona Roig; Sara Martínez; Arlet Zafra; Joana Buch; Ninoska Linares; Cristina Rueda; Mabel Olea; Ania Guijarro; Valeria Collado; Sara Roch; Amaia Romero; Cecilia Roth; Nora Navas; Rossy de Palma; Aixa Villagrán; Gracia Olayo
- Music by: Raül Refree; Hidrogenesse
- Country of origin: Spain
- Original languages: Spanish; Catalan
- No. of episodes: 7

Production
- Executive producers: Javier Calvo; Javier Ambrossi; Domingo Corral; Susana Herreras; Fran Araújo
- Cinematography: Gris Jordana
- Production companies: Movistar Plus+; Suma Content

Original release
- Network: Movistar Plus+
- Release: 11 October – 16 November 2023

La mesías is a Spanish family thriller television series with musical, religious, psychological drama and science fiction elements created, written, and directed by Javier Ambrossi and Javier Calvo ('Los Javis') that was originally released on Movistar Plus+ from 11 October to 16 November 2023. Its cast features Macarena García, Roger Casamajor, Lola Dueñas, Ana Rujas, Carmen Machi, and Albert Pla, among others.

== Plot ==
In the 1980s, 10-year-old Enric and his 8-year-old sister, Irene, are dragged away from their father by their mother, Montserrat, a volatile woman struggling with stability. Montserrat’s reckless lifestyle and severe neglect traumatize the children. Following a devastating apartment fire that leaves Irene facial scarring and rendered mute, Montserrat relocates the family to a remote, isolated villa with Pep Puig, a religious fanatic. Pep renames the children Isaías and Resurrección, imposing strict religious rules that forbid them from ever leaving the house or making contact with the outside world.

By 1996, Isaías (Enric) and Resurrección (Irene) help raise their six younger sisters — Aina, Julia, Cecilia, Neus, Beth and Nora — under Pep and Montserrat's severe isolation. As Montserrat’s mental health deteriorates into grandiose delusions, she claims to speak directly with God and forces her daughters into a Christian pop group called Stella Maris to fulfill a "divine mission to save humanity." Enric secretly introduces his sisters to musical movies using a stolen VHS tape and camera, but after Montserrat discovers this, she locks him in the basement and escalates her religious rule. Brief interventions by Social Services and temporary schooling fail to free the family; after a failed mass suicide attempt orchestrated by Montserrat, Enric is framed for an attack, thrown out of the house, and flees to Barcelona.

In 2012, an adult Enric spots a viral Stella Maris video on the news, prompting him to seek out Irene and attempt to rescue their younger sisters. Reconnecting after years of estrangement, Enric and Irene confront their abusive past — discovering their father Albert lived a separate wealthy life and that Montserrat has continued her delusional cult. Enric infiltrates the family home during Christmas, exposing Montserrat’s lies, which culminates in Cecilia fleeing the household to join Irene. Following a visionary ayahuasca trip where Enric finally processes his childhood trauma while Irene and Cecilia rebuild their lives.

== Cast ==
- Macarena García as Irene / Resurrección
- Roger Casamajor as Enric / Isaías
- Lola Dueñas as Montserrat
- Carmen Machi as Montserrat
- Ana Rujas as Montserrat
- Albert Pla as Pep
- Biel Rossell as Enric / Isaías
- Amaia Romero as Cecilia Puig Baró
- Cristina Rueda as Aina Puig Baró
- Mabel Olea as Julia Puig Baró
- Valeria Collado as Neus Puig Baró
- Ania Guijarro as Beth Puig Baró
- Sara Roch as Nora Puig Baró
- Cecilia Roth as Alicia
- Nora Navas
- Gracia Olayo as la tía Rosa
- Aixa Villagrán as la tía Rosa
- Carla Díaz as Lara
- Betsy Túrnez as Laia
- Ángeles Ortega
- Mari Paz Sayago
- Rossy de Palma
- Irene Balmes as Irene / Resurrección
- Bruno Núñez as Enric / Isaías
- Carla Moral as Irene / Resurrección
- Lluc Jornet
- Iona Roig
- Sara Martínez
- Joana Buch
- Arlet Zafra
- Ninoska Linares
- Carla Linares
- Javier Beltrán
- Vicenta Ndongo
- Eric Balbás
- George Steane
- Mariona Terés
- Daniela Santiago
- Nacho Vigalondo
- Laia Marull
- Eric Balbàs as Al

== Episodes ==
No.	Title	Directed by	Written by	Original release date
1	"Montserrat"	Javier Ambrossi & Javier Calvo	Javier Ambrossi & Javier Calvo	11 October 2023
In 2012, Enric Sellarès is a camera assistant working on a documentary about La Moreneta while staying at the Hotel Bruc, which is located next to Montserrat Mountain, with a group of UFO fanatics. When he goes to drink alone at the hotel bar, he sees a clip on the news of a viral music video featuring Stella Maris, a Christian pop act formed by his estranged sisters, whom he has not seen since he ran away from his religiously bigoted and over-controlling mother, Montserrat Baró. In 1986, 10-year-old Enric and his 8-year-old sister, Irene, are forced by Montserrat to leave their farmhouse with her after she abruptly ends her relationship with their father, Albert. They move into an apartment complex coincidentally named Stella Maris in Quart, which is managed by Lola. In 2012, a lighter that Enric meant to use to light a cigarette falls over the head of Alicia, a fellow UFO fanatic staying at the same hotel. They smoke cigarettes together while talking about alien abductions and their mythical beliefs before having casual sex in a car. Enric quickly leaves Alicia before finishing after feeling an alien-like hand on his back. Afterwards, he returns to his hotel room to find answers about his sisters. Meanwhile, Irene, who is now estranged from Enric, is engaged and works as the head manager of a sewing workshop. In 1986, Enric manages to take care of himself and Irene because Montserrat has been out for an entire day since their arrival. The two children grow close to their neighbor and Lola’s grandson, Xavi, who is left to live with her after his father, Alfonso, is arrested. Montserrat comes home drunk with a one-night stand, and the following morning, Enric and Irene ask to be taken to school, but Montserrat suggests that they should take some time to settle in. That day, Lola proposes that Montserrat take Enric to the jail where Alfonso is being held to smuggle drugs, which he successfully does. In 2012, Enric visits his step-aunt Rosa, where he asks about Irene, whom he discovers is also estranged from their sisters. Rosa knows nothing about Irene because she was forbidden from seeing any of them, but assures him that she is fine. When Enric goes to his old bedroom at Rosa’s house, he finds a rusty mini-machete. In 1997, 18-year-old Enric arrives at a train station in Barcelona covered in blood. When he reaches for the entrance, with the machete visible in his hand, he freezes and is immediately stopped by the police. A few moments later, Rosa comes to take him in. In 1986, Montserrat hosts a party in her apartment with her friends and neighbors, waking Enric, who is upset. Montserrat puts him back to bed and tells him that she has to live. Enric wakes the following morning to find the house dirty and Montserrat hungover in her bed. He lies down with her before an alien lies down behind him. In 2012, Enric bids Rosa farewell, and she gives him Irene’s current phone number and address. After failing to reach her phone number, Enric gets drunk at a bar and gets into a fight with a group of men watching a Stella Maris video. Irene celebrates her birthday at home with her husband, Ricardo, and her co-workers before opening her front door to find Enric, whom she immediately kicks out. That night, Enric, Alicia, and the group of UFO fanatics gather around Montserrat Mountain. Enric tells Alicia that he thinks he has been abducted at some point. They hug before Alicia gathers everyone around to talk about their experiences with alien abductions. Afterwards, Enric returns to his hotel room to watch a home video he made in 1996 with all his sisters together. In 1986, Enric and Irene spend the day with Xavi at home. After taking a nap, Enric wakes up to find the apartment in flames. He finds Irene, whose face is partially burnt, but Xavi is nowhere to be found and is presumed to have died in the fire.
2	"Resurrección"	Javier Ambrossi & Javier Calvo	Javier Ambrossi & Javier Calvo	11 October 2023
In 2012, Enric visits the now closed-off and abandoned villa where he used to live with his sisters, finding his bedroom completely empty, every trace of him erased, and his bed burnt down. Meanwhile, Irene watches commentary videos about Stella Maris. When she arrives at work, she finds a large graffiti reading “Resurrección” on the wall outside the entrance. This worries her so much that she cuts her finger deeply with a large pair of scissors. In 1987, Montserrat, Enric, and Irene move in with their grandparents and their aunt Laia after the fire. Irene has been mute since the accident and refuses to talk, while Montserrat struggles to find a job. She leaves the children alone with the family for days, during which they are enrolled in a school. On their first day, they are placed in separate classrooms, much to Enric’s discomfort, causing him to run away from his class. In 2012, Irene has dinner with Ricardo and their friends before he talks about how he noticed Irene watching Stella Maris’s music videos, which Irene denies before angrily leaving. She goes to the workshop, where she attempts to scrub off the graffiti, damaging the wound on her finger. In 1987, Montserrat returns home drunk in the middle of the night and takes Enric and Irene to move in with her and her new boyfriend, Joan, much to Laia’s disapproval. When they gather with Joan and their friends at their new home, Joan makes Irene laugh for the first time since her accident, causing Montserrat to angrily force her to talk until everyone calms her down. The next morning, Enric brings up his father, and Montserrat tells them that he has died and that they should move on. She also tells them that she has to prostitute herself in order to earn money. In 2012, Enric visits Laia for the first time since leaving with Montserrat, who tells him she hasn’t seen or heard from her since they left. Enric asks why she didn’t look for them after they left, but Laia claims she looked everywhere and that they had vanished completely. Laia reveals to Enric that Albert is alive and is living as a wealthy aristocrat in Girona. In 1987, Enric grows increasingly angry with Montserrat because of her reckless lifestyle, and one morning, Joan defends Irene after she is yelled at by Montserrat by eating lunch shirtless. Joan, infuriated that Montserrat assumes he is flirting with Irene, leaves the house immediately. Montserrat tells Enric and Irene that no man will ever love her because of them, to which Enric responds that no man will ever love her because she is a whore. Montserrat leaves and does not return for days. In 2012, Enric arrives at Albert’s home, where he meets his wife, Vicky, and his children. Meanwhile, Irene goes to Rosa’s house and scolds her for telling Enric about her whereabouts, believing that he was the one who drew the graffiti outside her workshop. Rosa then reveals a graffiti drawing on the back of her house reading “Satanas,” claiming that it wasn’t Enric who drew the graffiti, but Montserrat. In 1987, Laia looks for Montserrat with Enric and Irene and tells her that she has called Social Services and that the children will move back in with her soon, telling Montserrat that she is unfit to care for them. Irene mumbles, “It’s my fault,” her first words since the fire. In 2012, Enric and Vicky share a drink and talk about astrological charts in the backyard before Vicky assumes that he is visiting them for money, but Enric assures her that he is looking for his sisters. Vicky passive-aggressively tells Enric that she and her family want to know nothing about his sisters, his mother, or him because she and Albert have suffered enough trying to look for them. Enric bids Albert farewell, who tells him to live his life and not look for his sisters or mother. When Enric leaves, he gets out of his car and is hugged from behind by an alien. In 1987, Pep Puig, a religious fanatic who has been infatuated with Montserrat for a while, visits her and confesses his love for her, promising her a better life with him and her children far away if she confesses every one of her sins, which she reluctantly does. Shortly afterward, the four of them move to an old villa in the middle of the forest. Pep tells Enric and Irene that, in order to start their new life, their new names are Isaías and Resurrección, and that they shall never leave the house.
3	"Cantando bajo la lluvia"	Javier Ambrossi & Javier Calvo	Javier Ambrossi & Javier Calvo	19 October 2023
In 1988, Montserrat, Enric, and Irene spend their days in the filthy villa waiting for Pep, who eventually forces himself on a sick Montserrat after she tries to seduce him and he initially resists; fed up with his strict religious rule and after he discards her books, Montserrat flees with the children the next morning, only to wake up in a Catholic hospital where she learns she nearly miscarried, prompting a panicked Enric to attempt a failed escape when Pep arrives asserting God is on their side. In 1996, Enric (now called Isaías) and 16-year-old Irene (called Resurrección) help care for their younger sisters — Aina, Julia, Cecilia, Neus, and Beth — when Pep and Montserrat return with a new baby girl they name Nora. As Montserrat succumbs to undiagnosed mental illness, refusing to leave her bed and aggressively demanding Isaías take the baby for the night, Isaías joins Pep at a gardening job where he steals a Singin' in the Rain VHS tape, becoming obsessed with musical films before Pep is fired under suspicion of the theft. Pep’s impending move to La Seu d’Urgell causes Montserrat to break down and verbally abuse the children, while Isaías introduces Resurrección and later the younger sisters to the movie to comfort and entertain them — even through a chickenpox outbreak — though Aina believes the actors are trapped for their sins and eventually destroys the tape out of guilt, believing it caused her mother's illness. After Pep brings his sister Rosa to homeschool the children and temporarily sends Montserrat to a clinic, Isaías sneaks into town and buys a camcorder, which the siblings use to film a musical remake titled "Singin' after the Flood." Upon returning home claiming she now speaks directly with God, Montserrat discovers the children making the video, and learns Isaías stole the original tape, declaring he has Satan inside him; when Isaías retaliates by threatening to reveal her reckless past, Montserrat locks him in the basement — where he copes by imagining himself dancing across the walls and ceiling — while she retreats to write down divine dictations, ultimately emerging to announce to the family that God has given her a divine mission they must all help complete.
4	"Instrucciones divinas para salvar el mundo"	Javier Ambrossi & Javier Calvo	Javier Ambrossi & Javier Calvo & Nacho Vigalondo	26 October 2023
In 2012, Enric agrees to meet up with Irene at a restaurant after she unexpectedly calls him, where Enric admits he has visited the villa and wants to find and save their sisters. In 1996, Montserrat writes a book titled “Divine Instructions to Save the World” based on her conversations with God, and Pep has 200 copies printed to distribute at the local church; however, a woman named Pruden recognizes Pep as José María from her former Listral Club, causing him to panic and leave. Meanwhile, Montserrat starts a business where people communicate with God through her, but she kicks out a journalist named Darío after he warns her that what she is doing is dangerous. Montserrat later hosts the local priest for dinner, asking him for a platform large enough to reach the Vatican, but he offers her a spot at a local Catholic music festival instead. During a conversation with God, Montserrat is instructed that Isaías and Resurrección must form a musical duo called “Ramas de Olivo” to perform a song written by God Himself — slapping Isaías when he dares to correct a flawed rhyme in the lyrics. In 2012, Ricardo is surprised when Irene tells him about her meeting with Enric — whom she had never mentioned before — and reveals that she is traveling somewhere with him the following day. In 1996, Isaías and Resurrección arrive at the festival, where Pep encounters Pruden and other Listral Club members, confiding in Pruden that he lost faith after being accused of sexual harassment, remaining lost until he met Montserrat. Although Isaías and Resurrección are initially denied entry because they are missing from the lineup, an artist's absence gives them a chance to perform; however, the performance fails when Resurrección suffers severe stage fright. Humiliated, Montserrat punishes them at home by forcing the entire family to mock them, before gathering Aina, Julia, Cecilia, Neus, and Beth to form a new musical group, Stella Maris, while the family consumes musical media, Resurrección sews dresses, and Montserrat teaches the girls to sing and dance. In 2012, Enric and Irene talk about their lives since escaping as they drive to the family’s second farmhouse, only to find it has been sold and converted into a nightclub; while Enric searches for the new owner, Irene reminisces about her time in the house after Enric left and takes drugs with other partygoers. In 1996, while the family tries to distribute Stella Maris's first music video, Social Services arrive to inspect the villa following strange phone calls, forcing the younger children to hide in the storage room. After Social Services leave, Montserrat accuses Rosa of calling them; when Rosa voices her growing concern for Montserrat's sanity, Pep kicks her out of the house. The next day, Pep beats up Darío after the journalist publishes an article calling Montserrat a phony, while Pruden discovers a graffiti message outside the church addressing her and warning her to "be careful." In 2012, Irene begins hallucinating her sisters and Montserrat due to the hard drugs, and when Enric finds her, she confesses that she — not Rosa — was the one who led Social Services with strange calls back in 1996. In 1996, a team raids the house, taking the girls, except Resurrección, into custody, while Isaías is nowhere to be found.
5	"Una mujer vestida de sol"	Javier Ambrossi & Javier Calvo	Javier Ambrossi & Javier Calvo & Carmen Jiménez	2 November 2023
In 1996, the Puig Baró sisters stay at an orphanage until authorities assure them it is safe to return home. In 2012, Irene returns to her job and receives a package from Stella Maris containing a white dress that belonged to her in her youth. Irene then confides in her lawyer sister-in-law, Greta, to begin building a legal case to remove her sisters from their mother. Meanwhile, Enric tracks down his sisters' address in a nearby village by following Pep’s old car and immediately informs Irene. In 1996, Pep and Montserrat attempt to reclaim their daughters from Social Services by showing them a video compilation of happy family moments. Social Services demand that the girls be enrolled in school or face permanent placement with foster families. In 2012, Irene and Greta visit Rosa to gather evidence of past abuse, where Irene ominously tells Greta that "the world ended" after the sisters returned home and disappeared from society again. In 1996, the sisters return home under the strict condition that they attend school without speaking to outsiders or mentioning Montserrat’s divine visions. The sisters attend school, Isaías begins working for the Red Cross, and Resurrección starts at a sewing workshop. Carrying a mini-machete for self-defense, Isaías attends to a dying man from a bicycle accident, while Resurrección gets lost on her commute but receives directions from Álex, a young man who shows romantic interest in her. On their first day, the Puig Baró sisters face immediate mockery from classmates who recognize them from local news reports. In 2012, Irene informs Rosa that Enric found their sisters and that they plan to visit them soon, before asking her husband, Ricardo, to accompany her to the police station. In 1996, as Cecilia joins the school choir, Isaías is invited to the movies by a colleague, and Resurrección goes on a picnic with Álex, Pep and Montserrat grow increasingly paranoid about losing control. During dinner, Montserrat claims God told her that one of her children betrayed her, calling Resurrección a prostitute upon learning about Álex and demanding she focus solely on their spiritual mission. After Aina reveals that Cecilia joined the choir, Montserrat demands Cecilia sing; when Cecilia refuses, Isaías intervenes, asserting that God does not speak to Montserrat and that they do not need to save the world. In 2012, Irene, Ricardo, and Greta visit the police station to present their case against Montserrat, while a drunk Enric arrives at the family's house and calls for his mother outside. In 1997, after being thrown out of the house, Isaías attempts to break back in during a religious ritual and threatens Pep with his mini-machete; Pep grabs the blade, cuts his own arm, and smears the blood on Isaías to frame him for an unprovoked attack. Montserrat screams at Isaías to leave, and he shares a final look with his sisters before he flees. Montserrat then attempts a mass suicide pact by opening several propane tanks to poison the family with carbon monoxide, but abruptly stops after claiming God told her they do not need to die to save the world, leaving a traumatized Resurrección weeping while the rest of the family applauds. In 2012, Enric breaks into the family’s house and falls asleep on the sofa.
6	"La cara de mi madre"	Javier Ambrossi & Javier Calvo	Javier Ambrossi & Javier Calvo	9 November 2023
In 2012, Enric wakes up and explores the house, seeing his sisters for the first time since he left as they rehearse a music video. When the girls panic, Enric offers to help them record it. Montserrat greets him warmly and invites him to stay for Christmas dinner. While preparing for the feast, Montserrat reveals that God writes the lyrics for Stella Maris through her, though lately He has been writing rhymes through Aina, who remains deeply hostile toward Enric. The sisters explain Christian Electronic Dance Music to Enric and share their belief that the world will end without God’s mission. However, Enric rebuffs Montserrat by reminding her of her past mass suicide attempt and confessing he is there to save his sisters from her. To prove him wrong after he claims the girls are trapped, Montserrat briefly sends the sisters outside before fainting. In her bedroom, Montserrat tells Enric that she missed him, recalling how serious he was as a boy and bringing up a story of when he visited his cousin alone and called her because he missed her; she then claims Enric came back to save himself rather than his sisters. While Enric smokes outside, Cecilia sneaks out to play with his cigarette before showing him a hidden room where she plays a song on the piano, confessing that Irene suffered severe depression after Enric left, that Montserrat fell ill after Irene left, and that she personally longs to live in the outside world. Aina finds them, sends Cecilia to her room, and warns Enric not to be a bad influence on Cecilia. On Christmas Day, the girls rehearse a new song with Pep while Enric records them, but Irene suddenly arrives, confronting the family for the first time in years. Irene is visibly annoyed with Enric, having explicitly warned him at the police station not to contact the family without her. During dinner, Irene discovers her sisters falsely believe she left home to get married. Aina then reveals her serious belief that she will marry King Felipe VI, claiming they have exchanged letters for years and the sisters even prepared her wedding dress. Irene shatters the illusion by stating that Felipe VI is already married to Queen Letizia, before confronting Montserrat for stalking her and revealing she filed a kidnapping report against her. As tensions escalate, Irene locks herself in Montserrat’s room, finds Aina’s unmailed letters to Felipe VI, and threatens to expose them. Montserrat then confesses she is dying of cancer — the real reason she tracked Irene down — and claims that if she dies, the world will end unless Irene joins Stella Maris to help save humanity. Ignoring her mother, Irene hands the letters back to Aina, while Montserrat warns Irene that the family will be gone before the police arrive. As Irene exits, Enric impulsively grabs Nora and carries her to his car, with Pep, Montserrat, and Irene in pursuit. However, a panicked Nora fights Enric off, forcing him to let her go. Back at the house, after Aina burns her letters, Cecilia decides to leave the house, with Aina coldly shutting the door on her. Cecilia runs freely across an open field until she reaches a gas station, where she finds Irene and the two sisters embrace.
7	"Wonderland"	Javier Ambrossi & Javier Calvo	Javier Ambrossi & Javier Calvo	16 November 2023
In January 2013, Enric returns to Hotel Bruc, where a distressed mother is searching for her missing son, Nicolás. Meanwhile, Cecilia — now living under the care of Irene and Ricardo — shops for furniture at IKEA for her new bedroom, as Irene promises to help her enroll in college so she can decide her own future. Back at Hotel Bruc, Enric tries to locate Alicia, only to learn she has stopped attending the UFO enthusiasts' monthly meetings. Soon after, a brawl erupts when a group of teenagers, believing the UFO group kidnapped Nicolás, attacks the members. While helping clean paint off one of the women, Enric learns that Alicia is staying at "Wonderland," a location in the Montserrat mountains. Shortly after Cecilia's first therapy session, the therapist informs Irene that Cecilia wants to attend Sunday mass, an idea Irene initially resists; later in the car, they listen to a song by the singer Cecilia. Driven to find answers, Enric hikes up the mountain and discovers that Wonderland is a women's rehabilitation center run by a woman named Tere. To speak with Alicia, Enric meets with Tere and explains that he feels lost and seeks Alicia's guidance because of their shared experiences. Tere has Enric sing El Virolai and suggests he join the home to heal through an ayahuasca ritual. Deciding to stay, Enric discovers that Nicolás, the missing teenager, is also there. When he meets with Alicia, she explains that she is on a new path and advises him to stay sober before taking the ayahuasca. Meanwhile, Irene takes Cecilia, Ricardo, and his family to visit Rosa, who shares a story about her first time going to a gay bar in Barcelona. During the visit, Cecilia asks Irene what happened when she left the family; Irene reveals that her sewing workshop had offered her a scholarship, prompting her to take a bus to the University of Girona one day instead of returning home. Later, when Irene asks Cecilia why she wants to return to Sunday mass, Cecilia admits she misses her sisters and does not want to lose everything from her past. That evening at Wonderland, Enric participates in the spiritual ceremony and consumes the ayahuasca, immediately falling into a vivid, terrifying hallucination. He envisions himself being picked up by a young Montserrat, then sees his ten-year-old self alongside an alien — who turns out to be Alfonso, who had a brief affair with Montserrat and sexually abused Enric as a child. A terrified Enric is then transported to the old family villa, where he follows a light into Montserrat's bedroom. A middle-aged Montserrat passionately kisses him before transforming into an elderly, dying version of herself who bids Enric farewell as a UFO carries her away. After hallucinating that he is vomiting up a black fetus, Enric wakes up weeping and is comforted by Tere. In the middle of the night, Irene receives a phone call from one of her sisters informing her that Montserrat has died. Enric departs Wonderland and reassures Nicolás's mother that her son is safe. After Stella Maris releases a final music video honoring Montserrat, Irene, Cecilia and Ricardo watch it together before attending her funeral with Enric. At the funeral home, Irene confronts Pep, offering to withdraw her legal report against him on the condition that he enrolls Nora in school and allows Cecilia to visit her sisters regularly — a deal Pep accepts. Enric, Irene, and Cecilia view Montserrat's body one last time before going to a local carnival. There, the three siblings and Ricardo play games and ride the attractions together for the first time. Irene expresses a desire to see Enric more often, but Enric admits he is still mentally unwell and plans to leave soon. Sometime later, Irene and Ricardo attend Sunday mass to watch Cecilia sing in the choir. Meanwhile, Enric travels to India to visit Amma, a guru known for healing people through her embrace, where he stays to work as a cook and begin his own healing process.

== Production ==
The series is a Movistar Plus+ original, produced in collaboration with Suma Content. Shooting locations in Catalonia included Barcelona, Girona, Mataró, Òrrius, Santa Eulàlia de Ronçana, Calaf, Arenys de Mar, Manresa, Gualba, and Santa Susanna. The series was lensed by Gris Jordana. Raül Refree (score) and Hidrogenesse (original songs) were responsible for the music.

== Release ==
The series was presented as a non-competitive screening in the official selection of the 71st San Sebastián International Film Festival on 29 September 2023. It debuted on Movistar Plus+ on 11 October 2023. The original broadcasting run ended on 16 November 2023, with the release of episode 7.

HBO LatAm and Movistar Plus+ International agreed on a deal for the distribution of the series in Latin American territories. The series was selected to have its international premiere in a showcase at the 2024 Sundance Film Festival. Arte acquired rights for France and Germany as well as other European countries such as Switzerland, Austria, Belgium, Andorra, Monaco, and Luxembourg. Starting on 1 April 2026, Hulu and Disney+ released the series in the United States. Mubi programmed a streaming release in the United Kingdom, Canada, Turkey, the Netherlands, Germany, Austria, and Australia for 3 September 2026. At the September 2026 Iberseries & Platino Industria market, Mubi was announced to have acquired worldwide rights to the series.

== Accolades ==
Year	Award	Category	Nominee(s)	Result	Ref.
2023	29th Forqué Awards	Best TV Series		Won	
2023	29th Forqué Awards	Best Actor in a TV Series	Albert Pla	Nominated	
2023	29th Forqué Awards	Best Actor in a TV Series	Roger Casamajor	Won	
2023	29th Forqué Awards	Best Actress in a TV Series	Ana Rujas	Nominated	
2023	29th Forqué Awards	Best Actress in a TV Series	Lola Dueñas	Won	
2024	11th Feroz Awards	Best Drama Series		Won	
2024	11th Feroz Awards	Best Main Actress in a Series	Lola Dueñas	Won	
2024	11th Feroz Awards	Best Main Actress in a Series	Macarena García	Nominated	
2024	11th Feroz Awards	Best Main Actress in a Series	Ana Rujas	Nominated	
2024	11th Feroz Awards	Best Main Actor in a Series	Roger Casamajor	Won	
2024	11th Feroz Awards	Best Supporting Actress in a Series	Amaia	Nominated	
2024	11th Feroz Awards	Best Supporting Actress in a Series	Irene Balmes	Won	
2024	11th Feroz Awards	Best Supporting Actress in a Series	Carmen Machi	Nominated	
2024	11th Feroz Awards	Best Supporting Actor in a Series	Albert Pla	Won	
2024	11th Feroz Awards	Best Supporting Actor in a Series	Biel Rossell Pelfort	Nominated	
2024	11th Feroz Awards	Best Screenplay in a Series	Javier Calvo, Javier Ambrossi, Nacho Vigalondo, Carmen Jiménez	Won	
2024	32nd Actors and Actresses Union Awards	Best Television Actress in a Leading Role	Ana Rujas	Nominated	
2024	32nd Actors and Actresses Union Awards	Best Television Actress in a Leading Role	Lola Dueñas	Won	
2024	32nd Actors and Actresses Union Awards	Best Television Actress in a Minor Role	Gracia Olayo	Won	
2024	32nd Actors and Actresses Union Awards	Best Television Actress in a Minor Role	Vicenta Ndongo	Nominated	
2024	32nd Actors and Actresses Union Awards	Best New Actress	Cristina Rueda	Nominated	
2024	32nd Actors and Actresses Union Awards	Best New Actress	Irene Balmes	Nominated	
2024	7th ALMA Awards	Best Screenplay in a Drama Series	Javier Ambrossi, Javier Calvo, Carmen Jiménez, Nacho Vigalondo	Won	
2024	11th Platino Awards	Best Actress in a Miniseries or TV Series	Lola Dueñas	Won	
2024	11th Platino Awards	Best Supporting Actress in a Miniseries or TV Series	Carmen Machi	Won	
2024	71st Ondas Awards	Best Drama Series		Won	
