= The Other Side (TV series) =

2023 Spanish television series

- Spanish: El otro lado
- Created by: Berto Romero
- Written by: Berto Romero; Rafael Barceló; Enric Pardo
- Directed by: Javier Ruiz Caldera; Alberto de Toro
- Starring: Berto Romero; Andreu Buenafuente; Nacho Vigalondo; María Botto; Eva Ugarte
- Country of origin: Spain
- Original language: Spanish
- No. of episodes: 6

Original release
- Network: Movistar Plus+
- Release: 23 November – 7 December 2023

The Other Side (Spanish: El otro lado) is a Spanish horror comedy television series created by Berto Romero.

== Plot ==
Following a suicide attempt, Nacho Nieto, paranormal journalist at a low ebb, acquaints with the ghost of his long deceased mentor, Dr. Estrada, and so, he takes over a poltergeist case in a decrepit apartment in Barcelona haunting a widow and her son (Eva and Rubén) with the help of close collaborator Juana. He also comes across his nemesis, Gorka Romero, another (and more successful) pupil of Dr. Estrada.

== Cast ==
- Berto Romero as Nacho Nieto
- Andreu Buenafuente as doctor Estrada
- Nacho Vigalondo as Gorka Romero
- María Botto as Eva
- Eva Ugarte as Juana
- Ramón Barea

== Release ==
The series received a pre-screening in the 'Velodrome' section of the 71st San Sebastián International Film Festival on 24 September 2023. The first two episodes debuted on Movistar Plus+ on 23 November 2023.

== Reception ==
Raquel Hernández Luján of HobbyConsolas rated the series with 80 points ('very good'), assessing that in addition to the humour side, it also works in the horror side and the criticism towards a certain brand of journalism appealing to the gullibility of the audience.

Enric Albero of El Cultural wrote that the series "successfully combines jokes, scares and mordacity".

== Accolades ==
Year	Award	Category	Nominee(s)	Result	Ref.
2024	11th Feroz Awards	Best Comedy Series		Nominated	
2024	11th Feroz Awards	Best Supporting Actor in a TV Series	Andreu Buenafuente	Nominated	
2024	11th Feroz Awards	Best Screenplay in a TV Series	Berto Romero, Rafel Barceló, Enric Pardo	Nominated	
