= 32nd Actors and Actresses Union Awards =

2024 Spanish award ceremony

- Date: 11 March 2024
- Site: Circo Price, Madrid, Spain
- Hosted by: Arantxa Aranguren, Stephanie Gil, and Juan Messeguer
- Organized by: Actors and Actresses Union

Highlights
- Honorary career award: Gemma Cuervo

The 32nd Actors and Actresses Union Awards ceremony was held on 11 March 2024 at the Circo Price in Madrid. It was hosted by Arantxa Aranguren, Stephanie Gil, and Juan Messeguer.

In addition to the competitive awards, "the actresses who changed the language of cinema in Spain" were recognised with the 'Mujeres en Unión' award, whilst Gemma Cuervo was bestowed the 'Toda una vida' life achievement career award and SAG-AFTRA (Note: Duncan Crabtree-Ireland was responsible for collecting the award.) received the special award "for its work in defending the rights of the artistic community, its negotiating skills and its resilience at a key moment for all audiovisual professionals".

== Winners and nominees ==
The winners and nominees are listed as follows:

=== Film ===
Best Male Performance in a Leading Role: David Verdaguer — Jokes & Cigarettes; Alberto Ammann — Upon Entry; Manolo Solo — Close Your Eyes	Best Female Performance in a Leading Role: Malena Alterio — Something Is About to Happen; Carolina Yuste — Jokes & Cigarettes; Laia Costa — Un amor
Best Male Performance in a Secondary Role: Àlex Brendemühl — Creatura; Hugo Silva — Un amor; José Coronado — Close Your Eyes	Best Female Performance in a Secondary Role: Ane Gabarain — 20,000 Species of Bees; Aitana Sánchez-Gijón — Something Is About to Happen; Alexandra Jiménez — The Tenderness
Best Male Performance in a Minor Role: Víctor Clavijo — Someone Who Takes Care of Me; Álex García — Not Such an Easy Life; Luis Bermejo — Un amor	Best Female Performance in a Minor Role: Yeju Ji — Chinas, a Second Generation Story; Ingrid García-Jonsson — Un amor; Greta Fernández — Teresa

=== Television ===
Best Male Performance in a Leading Role: Quim Gutiérrez — Burning Body; José Pastor — Bosé; Yon González — Memento mori	Best Female Performance in a Leading Role: Lola Dueñas — La mesías; Ana Rujas — La mesías; Úrsula Corberó — Burning Body
Best Male Performance in a Secondary Role: Cristóbal Suárez — Untameable; Andrés Gertrúdix — The Purple Network; Pablo Gómez-Pando — The Invisible Girl	Best Female Performance in a Secondary Role: Pilar Gómez — Poquita fe; Ana Gracia — 4 estrellas; Begoña Maestre — Entre tierras
Best Male Performance in a Minor Role: Jorge Basanta — Poquita fe; Dani Muriel — Untameable; Luis Rallo — Mía es la venganza	Best Female Performance in a Minor Role: Gracia Olayo — La mesías; Alba Flores — Romancero; Vicenta Ndongo — La mesías

=== Theatre ===
Best Male Performance in a Leading Role: Alfredo Noval — Life Is a Dream; Carlos Hipólito — El proceso; Juanjo Artero — El milagro de la tierra	Best Female Performance in a Leading Role: Vicky Luengo — Prima Facie; Ana Fernández — El sueño de la razón; Blanca Portillo — La madre de Frankenstein
Best Male Performance in a Secondary Role: Ernesto Arias — Life Is a Dream; Miki Esparbé — Los pálidos; Víctor Palmero — El monstruo de White Roses	Best Female Performance in a Secondary Role: Belén Ponce de León — La madre de Frankenstein; Inma Cuevas — Chicago. El musical; Laura Galán — Animales de compañía
Best Male Performance in a Minor Role: Alberto Velasco — Los nadadores diurnos; Antonio Albella — Don Juan de Alcalá; Lucas Miramón — Grease. El musical	Best Female Performance in a Minor Role: Montse Peidro — El sueño de la razón; Beatriz Grimaldos — La celestina; María José Garrido — El aguafiestas

=== Newcomers ===
Best New Actor: Julio Hu Chen — Chinas, a Second Generation Story; La Dani — Love & Revolution; Omar Banana — Love & Revolution	Best New Actress: Xinyi Ye — Chinas, a Second Generation Story; Cristina Rueda — La mesías; Irene Balmes — La mesías

=== International productions ===
Best Male Performance in an International Production: Javier Godino — Sound of Freedom; Miguel Ángel Silvestre — Los enviados; Carlos Bardem — The Chosen One	Best Female Performance in an International Production: Maribel Verdú — The Flash; Paz Vega — Kaleidoscope; Natalia Millán — Bailo bailo. El musical
