= Alberto Ammann =

Argentine actor

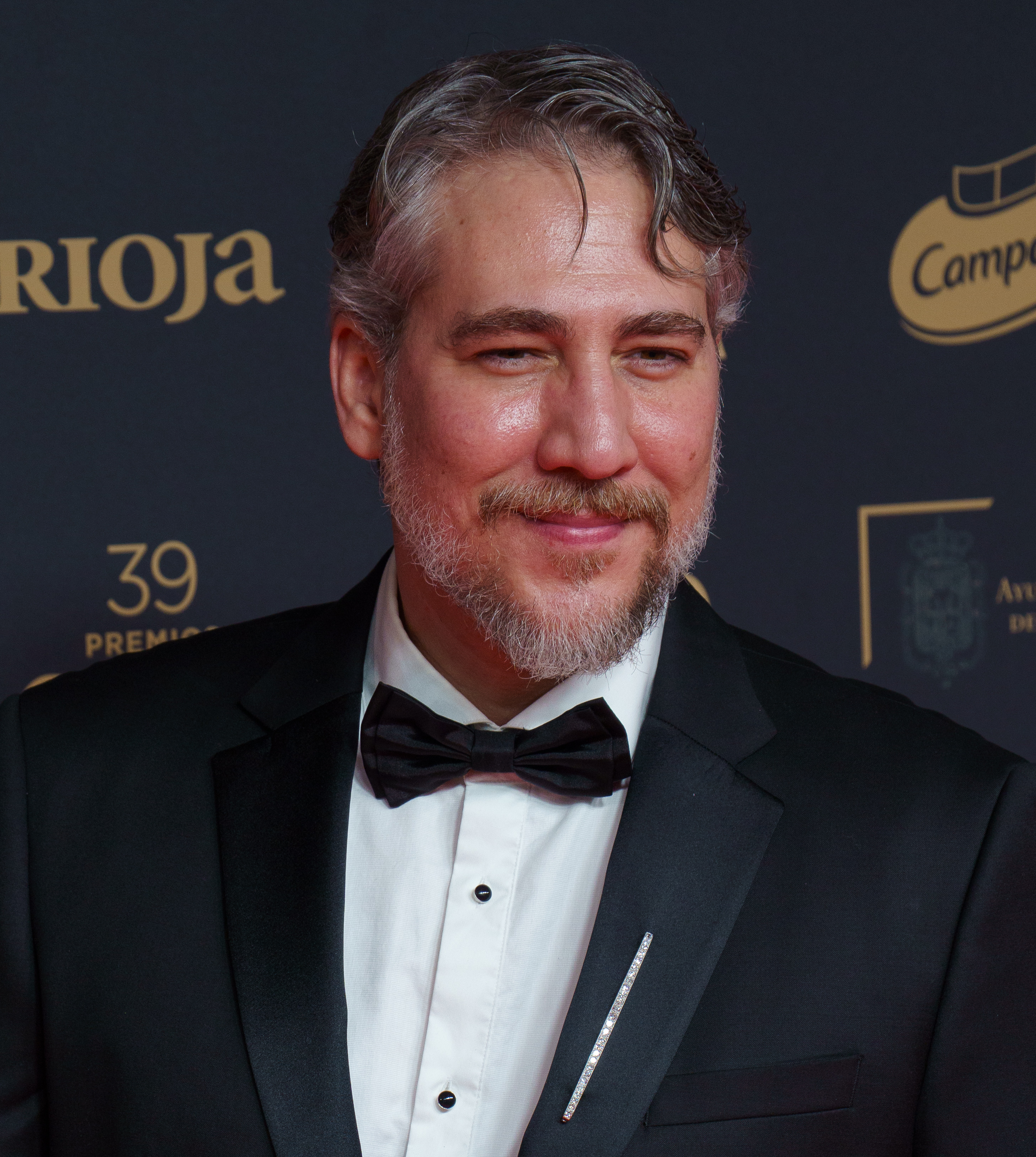
- Ammann in 2025
- Born: José Alberto Ammann Rey; 20 October 1978 (age 47); Córdoba, Argentina
- Citizenship: Argentina; Spain
- Occupations: Actor; musician
- Parent: Luis Alberto Ammann (father)

José Alberto Ammann Rey (born 1978) is an Argentine and Spanish actor. He has played various roles in films, television and theater. His feature film debut in Cell 211 (2009) earned him a Goya Award for Best New Actor. Other film works include performances in Lope: The Outlaw (2010), Eva (2011), Invader (2012), Thesis on a Homicide (2013), Betibú (2014), The Year of Fury (2020), Presencias (2022), and Upon Entry (2022). He is also known for playing Colombian drug trafficker Pacho Herrera in crime television series Narcos and Narcos: Mexico.

== Biography ==
Ammann was born in Córdoba, Argentina, son of journalist, politician, and writer Luis Alberto Ammann and Nélida Rey. In 1978, at the age of one month, he moved with his parents to Spain (Madrid and the Canary Islands), escaping from the last military dictatorship of Argentina, returning to the country in 1982. Years later, he returned to Spain to complete his studies.

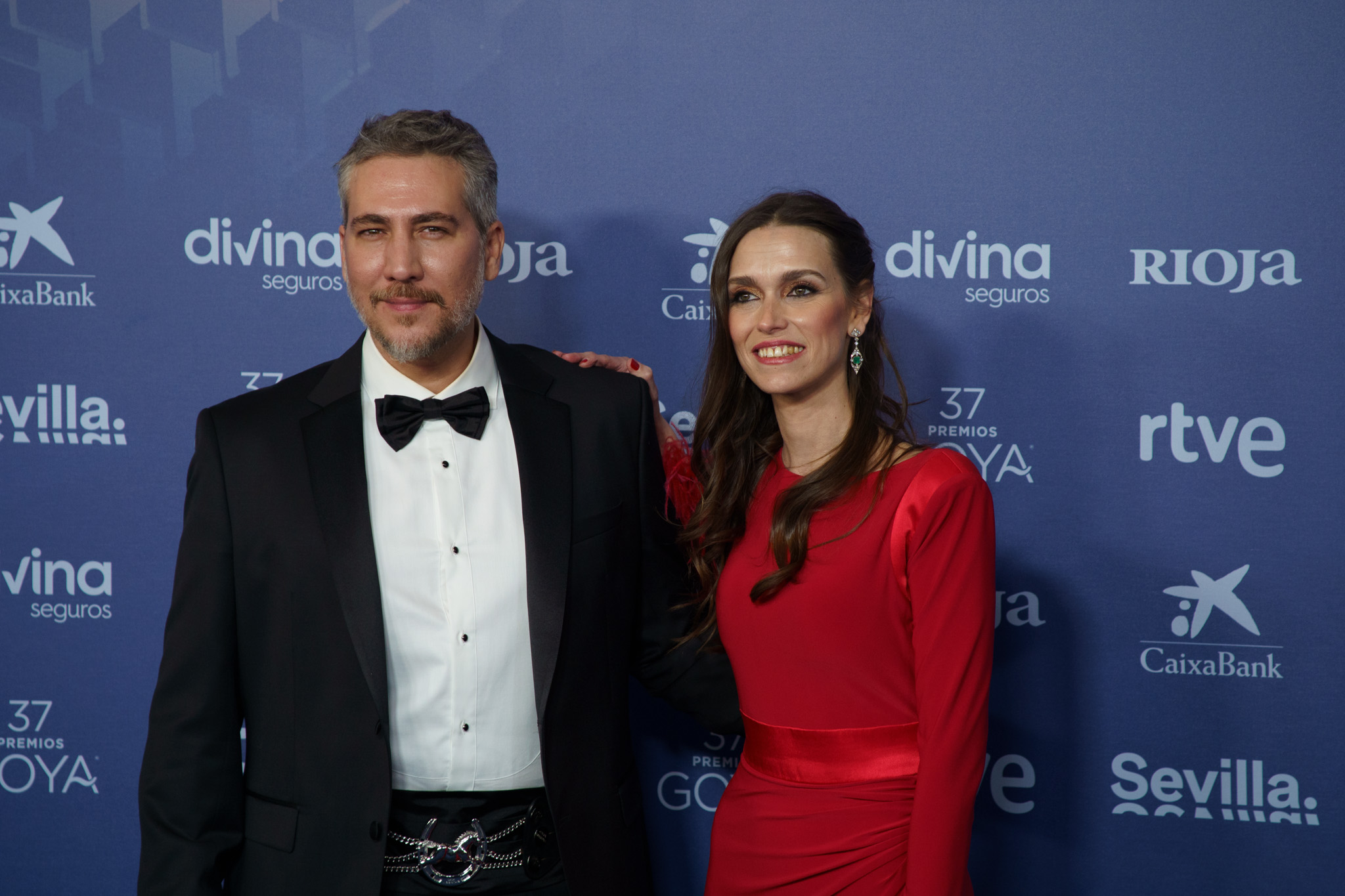
Ammann (left) and Clara Méndez-Leite in 2023

He studied acting in the school of Juan Carlos Corazza, as well as the Theater Seminary Jolie Libois, located in Cordoba. Ruben Andalor, Willy Lanni and Ricky Ceballos were among his teachers. Since 2010, he has been in a relationship with Clara Méndez-Leite, whom with he founded an acting school in Malasaña in 2017.

== Acting career ==
Ammann had his big screen debut in thriller film Cell 211 (2009); he portrayed Juan Oliver, a prison guard who gets mistaken for an inmate during a riot. He prepared for the role by talking to officers and prisoners. His performance won him the Goya Award for Best New Actor at the 24th Goya Awards.

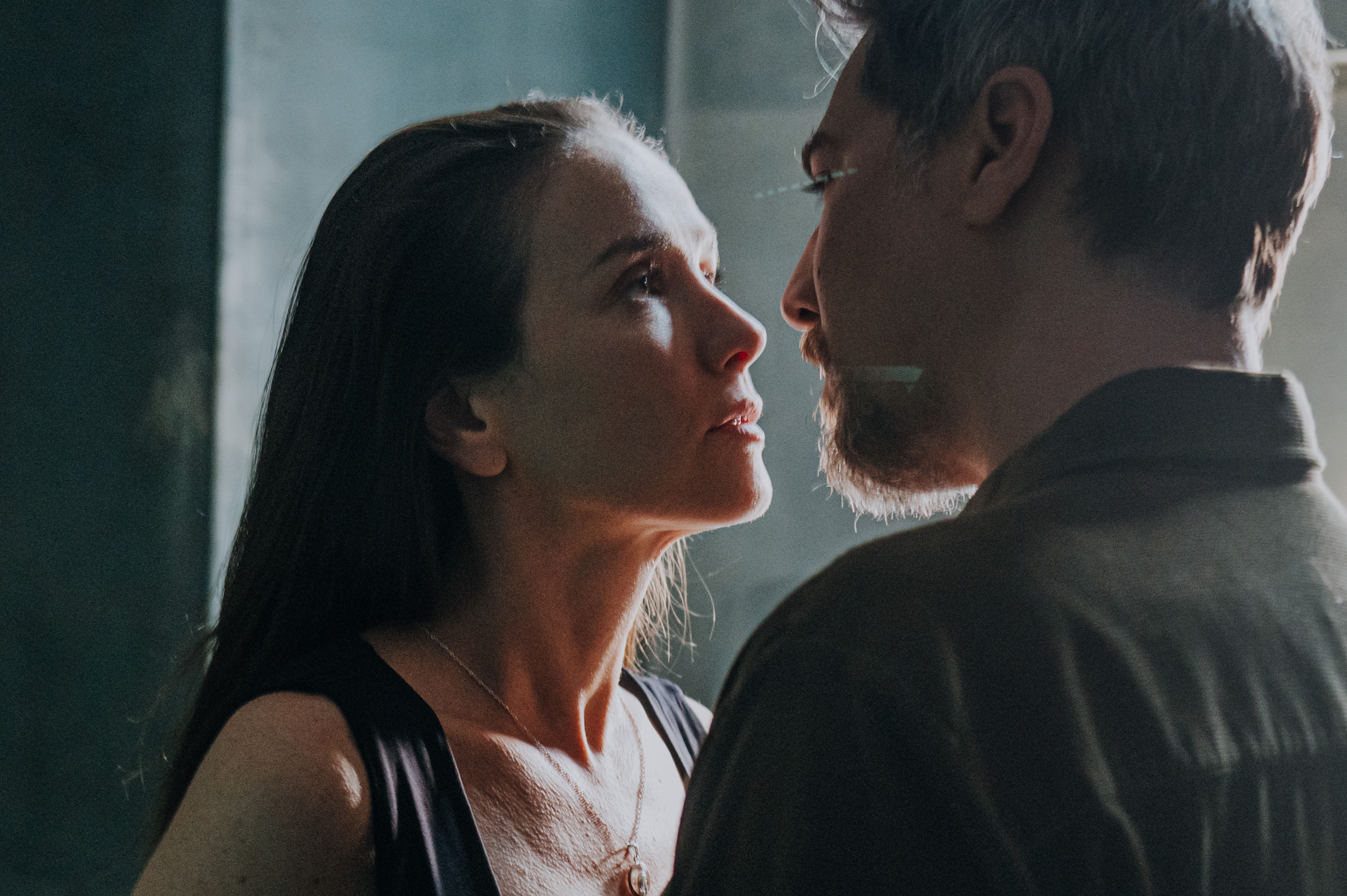
Ammann (right) along with Natalia Oreiro in The Woman in the Line (2025).

In 2010, Ammann starred in Lope in the title role, portraying poet-playwright Lope de Vega in his early years, when he was a young soldier who returns from war and then comes across two women.

Ammann starred in a Chanel commercial alongside Keira Knightley that aired in Hispanic countries starting on 4 April 2011.

In 2015, Ammann starred as Cali Cartel member Hélmer Herrera in the Netflix series, Narcos.

In 2016, Ammann starred as Javier Delgado, hydrologist and geochemist, in National Geographic's mini-series Mars.

2017 saw the release of television series Apaches on Netflix; an adaptation of Miguel Saez Carral's book of the same title. Ammann stars as protagonist Miguel, a young and promising journalist.

== Filmography ==
=== Film ===
Year	Title	Role	Notes	Ref.
2009	Celda 211 (Cell 211)	Juan Oliver		
2010	Lope (Lope: The Outlaw)	Lope		
2011	Eva	David Garel		
2012	Invasor (Invader)	Pablo		
2013	Tesis sobre un homicidio	Gonzalo Ruiz Cordera		
2013	Combustión (Combustion)	Navas		
2013	Mindscape	Tom Ortega	First English-speaking role	
2014	Betibú	Mariano Saravia		
2015	The Debt	Ricardo		
2017	Lazaro: An Improvised Film	Tino		
2019	El silencio del cazador	Orlando Venneck		
2020	El año de la furia (The Year of Fury)	Diego		
2022	Presencias	Víctor		
2022	Overdose	Eduardo Gracia		
2022	Upon Entry (La llegada) (Upon Entry)	Diego		
2024	Disco, Ibiza, Locomía	José Luis Gil		
2024	Justicia artificial (Artificial Justice)	Alex		
2025	La mujer de la fila (The Woman in the Line)	Alejo		

=== Television ===
Year	Title	Role	Notes	Ref.
2008	Plan América (Plan)	Capitán Mateo		
2010	No soy como tú (I'm not like you)	Alberto		
2015–2017	Narcos	Hélmer "Pacho" Herrera		
2017	Apaches	Miguel		
2016–2018	Mars	Javier Delgado		
2018–2021	Narcos: Mexico	Hélmer "Pacho" Herrera		
2022	The Longest Night	Hugo Roca		
2024	Griselda	Alberto Bravo		
2025	Atrapados	Leo Mercer		
2026	The Night Manager	Alejandro Gualteros	3 episodes	

== Theater ==
- Las brujas de Salem (The Crucible) (directed by Ricardo Ceballos)
- Paria (directed by Guillermo Ianni)

== Accolades ==
Year	Award	Category	Work	Result	Ref.
2010	24th Goya Awards	Best New Actor	Cell 211	Won	
2010	19th Actors and Actresses Union Awards	Best New Actor	Cell 211	Won	
2011	66th CEC Medals	Best Actor	Lope	Nominated	
2019	28th Actors and Actresses Union Awards	Best Actor in an International Production	Narcos: Mexico	Won	
2023	29th Forqué Awards	Best Actor in a Film	Upon Entry	Nominated	
2024	11th Feroz Awards	Best Actor in a Film	Upon Entry	Nominated	
2024	16th Gaudí Awards	Best Actor	Upon Entry	Nominated	
2024	38th Goya Awards	Best Actor	Upon Entry	Nominated	
2024	32nd Actors and Actresses Union Awards	Best Film Actor in a Leading Role	Upon Entry	Nominated	
2026	34th Actors and Actresses Union Awards	Best Actor in an International Production	Caught	Won	
2026	20th Sur Awards	Best Actor	The Woman in the Line	Nominated	
