= 29th Forqué Awards =

2023 Spanish film and television awards

- Date: 16 December 2023
- Site: IFEMA Palacio Municipal, Madrid, Spain
- Hosted by: Macarena Gómez; Pablo Chiapella
- Organized by: EGEDA

The 29th Forqué Awards, organised by EGEDA, were presented on 16 December 2023 at the IFEMA Palacio Municipal in Madrid.

== Background ==
Organised by EGEDA, the ceremony has the participation of Ayuntamiento de Madrid, the Madrid regional administration and RTVE, and the collaboration of the Spanish Ministry of Culture and Sport and FIPCA. In October 2023, producer Eduardo Campoy was announced as the recipient of the EGEDA Gold Medal. The organisers also announced creation of a new award category, the Forqué Award for Best Animation Film. The nominations were disclosed on 7 November 2023. Later in November, Macarena Gómez and Pablo Chiapella were revealed as the gala hosts. The gala featured musical performances by Ana Guerra, Fran Perea, Ana Mena, Taburete, and Vicco.

== Winners and nominations ==
The winners and nominees are listed as follows:

Best Fiction Film: 20,000 Species of Bees; Close Your Eyes; Society of the Snow; Upon Entry	Best Fiction Series: La mesías; 30 Coins (S2); Burning Body; Little Faith
Best Male Performance in a Film: David Verdaguer — Jokes & Cigarettes; Alberto Ammann — Upon Entry; Hovik Keuchkerian — Un amor; Manolo Solo — Close Your Eyes	Best Female Performance in a Film: Malena Alterio — Something Is About to Happen; Blanca Portillo — Teresa; Laia Costa — Un amor; María Vázquez — Matria
Best Male Performance in a Series: Roger Casamajor — La mesías; Albert Pla — La mesías; Javier Cámara — Rapa (S2); Raúl Cimas — Little Faith	Best Female Performance in a Series: Lola Dueñas — La mesías; Ana Rujas — La mesías; Úrsula Corberó — Burning Body; Esperanza Pedreño — Little Faith
Best Documentary Film: Juan Mariné, un siglo de cine; El caso Padilla; Iberia, naturaleza infinita; Samsara	Best Latin-American Film: The Eternal Memory; Puan; The Settlers; The Fishbowl
Best Short Film: Aunque es de noche; Actos por partes; París 70	Best Animation Film: Robot Dreams; They Shot the Piano Player; Sultana's Dream; Mummies
Cinema and Education in Values: 20,000 Species of Bees; Championext; Chinas, a Second Generation Story; Love & Revolution
