= 11th Feroz Awards =

Spanish film and television awards

- Date: 26 January 2024
- Site: Palacio Vistalegre Arena, Madrid, Spain
- Hosted by: Coria Castillo; Brays Efe
- Organized by: Asociación de Informadores Cinematográficos de España

Highlights
- Most awards: Film: Robot Dreams (3); Television: La Mesías (6)
- Most nominations: Film: Close Your Eyes (9); Television: La Mesías (11)

The 11th Feroz Awards ceremony, presented by the Asociación de Informadores Cinematográficos de España, took place at the Palacio Vistalegre Arena in Madrid, on 26 January 2024, to recognize the best in Spanish cinema and television. The gala was hosted by Coria Castillo and Brays Efe.

In the film categories, Víctor Erice's Close Your Eyes received the most nominations with nine, followed by 20,000 Species of Bees and Un amor, with seven each. Movistar Plus+ series La Mesías led the nominations with a record-breaking eleven nominations.

In the film categories, Robot Dreams won the most awards, with three. In the television categories, La Mesías won every category it was nominated in, resulting in a record-breaking total of six awards.

== Background ==
In October 2023, it was announced that the ceremony would not take place in Zaragoza. The previous two ceremonies had been held at the Auditorio de Zaragoza. It was later announced that the awards ceremony would take place in a venue yet to be announced within Madrid. The nominations were announced by actors Laura Galán and Miguel Bernardeau on 23 November 2023, through a live-stream from Sede DAMA (Derechos de Autor de Medios Audiovisuales) in Madrid. The nominations for the special awards (fiction and non-fiction) will be announced on 14 December 2023. On 15 December 2023, the Asociación de Informadores Cinematográficos de España revealed the Palacio Vistalegre Arena as the venue for the gala. Later in December, Coria Castillo and Brays Efe were announced as the gala hosts.

== Winners and nominees ==
The winners and nominees are listed as follows:

=== Film ===
Best Drama Film: 20,000 Species of Bees; produced by Lara Izaguirre, Valérie Delpierre; Un amor; produced by Marisa Fernández Armenteros, Sandra Hermida; Close Your Eyes; produced by Cristina Zumárraga, Pablo E. Bossi, Víctor Erice, Jose Alba; Society of the Snow; produced by Belén Atienza, Sandra Hermida, J.A. Bayona; Upon Entry; produced by Carles Torras, Carlos Juárez, Xosé Zapata, Sergio Adrià	Best Comedy Film: Robot Dreams; produced by Ibon Cormenzana, Ignasi Estapé, Sandra Tapia, Ángel Durández; Under Therapy; produced by Gerardo Herrero, Mariela Besuievsky; The Girls Are Alright; produced by Jonás Trueba, Javier Lafuente; Mamacruz; produced by Olmo Figueredo González-Quevedo, Carlos Rosado Sibón, José Alba; Love & Revolution; produced by Aintza Serra, Paloma Molina, Sergi Casamitjana, Antonio Asensio
Best Director: J.A. Bayona – Society of the Snow; Isabel Coixet – Un amor; Víctor Erice – Close Your Eyes; Elena Martín Gimeno – Creatura; Estibaliz Urresola Solaguren – 20,000 Species of Bees	Best Screenplay: Juan Sebastián Vásquez, Alejandro Rojas – Upon Entry; Estibaliz Urresola Solaguren – 20,000 Species of Bees; Isabel Coixet, Laura Ferrero – Un amor; Víctor Erice, Michel Gaztambide – Close Your Eyes; Elena Martín Gimeno, Clara Roquet – Creatura
Best Actor in a Film: David Verdaguer – Jokes & Cigarettes as Eugenio; Alberto Ammann – Upon Entry as Diego; Enric Auquer – The Teacher Who Promised the Sea as Antoni Benaiges; Hovik Keuchkerian – Un amor as Andreas; Manolo Solo – Close Your Eyes as Miguel Garay	Best Actress in a Film: Malena Alterio – Something Is About to Happen as Lucía; Laia Costa – Un amor as Nat; Kiti Mánver – Mamacruz as Cruz; María Vázquez – Matria as Ramona; Carolina Yuste – Jokes & Cigarettes as Conchita
Best Supporting Actor in a Film: La Dani – Love & Revolution as Dani; Luis Bermejo – Un amor as Casero; José Coronado – Close Your Eyes as Julio Arenas / Gardel; Oriol Pla – Creatura as Marcel; Hugo Silva – Un amor as Piter	Best Supporting Actress in a Film: Patricia López Arnaiz – 20,000 Species of Bees as Ane; Ane Gabarain – 20,000 Species of Bees as Lourdes; Luisa Gavasa – The Teacher Who Promised the Sea as Charo; Aitana Sánchez-Gijón – Something Is About to Happen as Roberta; Ana Torrent – Close Your Eyes as Ana Arenas
Best Original Soundtrack: Alfonso de Vilallonga — Robot Dreams; Federico Jusid — Close Your Eyes; Zeltia Montes — Something Is About to Happen; Michael Giacchino — Society of the Snow; Nico Casal — Love & Revolution	Best Trailer: Harry Eaton — Society of the Snow; Liviu Neagoe — 20,000 Species of Bees; Elena Gutiérrez — Close Your Eyes; Miguel Ángel Sanantonio — Jokes & Cigarettes; Mikel Garmilla — Love & Revolution
Best Film Poster: José Luis Ágreda — Robot Dreams; Cristina Hernández Bernardo — 20,000 Species of Bees; Sergio Pozas, Manolo Pavón — Close Your Eyes; Alejandro Llamas Sánchez — The Rye Horn; Iñaki Villuendas, José Haro — Sister Death
'Arrebato' Special Award (Fiction): Foremost by Night; Sultana's Dream; The Permanent Picture; The Rye Horn; Teresa	'Arrebato' Special Award (non-Fiction): La Singla; Ara la llum cau vertical; La mala familia; While You're Still You; Samsara

=== Television ===
Best Drama Series: La mesías – Fran Araújo, Susana Herreras, Javier Ambrossi, Javier Calvo; Burning Body – Ibon Cormenzana, Andrea Martínez, Jorge Torregrossa; The Left-Handed Son – Fran Araújo, Alberto Félez, Cristina Sutherland, José Antonio Félez; Rapa – Domingo Corral, Susana Herreras, Alfonso Blanco; Selftape – Joana Vilapuig, Mireia Vilapuig, Ivan Mercadé, Jaume Ripoll	Best Comedy Series: Little Faith – Fran Araújo, Ignacio Corrales, Pepe Ripoll; Citas Barcelona – Pau Freixas, Eric Navarro, Laura Fernández, Oriol Sala-Patau; This Is Not Sweden – Marta Baldó, Aina Clotet, Sergi Cameron, Marc Clotet; The Other Side – Fran Araújo, Susana Herreras, Xen Subirats, Laura Fernández Espeso
Best Main Actor in a Series: Roger Casamajor – La mesías; Javier Cámara – Rapa; Raúl Cimas – Little Faith; Patrick Criado – Nights in Tefía; Quim Gutiérrez – Burning Body	Best Main Actress in a Series: Lola Dueñas – La mesías; Úrsula Corberó – Burning Body; Macarena García – La mesías; Esperanza Pedreño – Little Faith; Ana Rujas – La mesías
Best Supporting Actor in a Series: Albert Pla – La mesías; Andreu Buenafuente – The Other Side; Chani Martín – Little Faith; Biel Rossell Pelfort – La mesías; José Manuel Poga – Burning Body	Best Supporting Actress in a Series: Irene Balmes – La mesías; Amaia – La mesías; Tamara Casellas – The Left-Handed Son; Julia de Castro – Little Faith; Carmen Machi – La mesías
Best Screenplay in a Series: Javier Calvo, Javier Ambrossi, Nacho Vigalondo, Carmen Jiménez – La mesías; Laura Sarmiento, Eduard Sola, Carlos López, José Luis Martín – Burning Body; Rafael Cobos – The Left-Handed Son; Berto Romero, Rafel Barceló, Enric Pardo – The Other Side; Pepón Montero, Juan Maidagán – Little Faith

=== Honorary Award ===
- Mónica Randall
