= El Confidencial =

Spanish newspaper

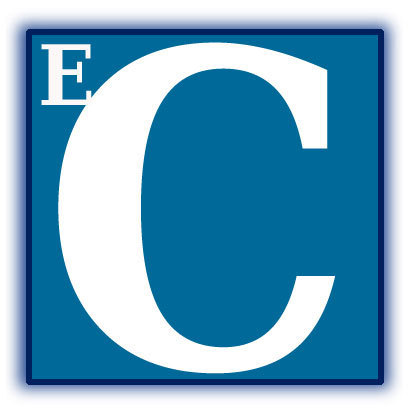
- Founded: 2001
- Political alignment: Liberal
- Language: Spanish
- Country: Spain
- Website: elconfidencial.com (in Spanish)

El Confidencial is a Spanish-language general-information digital newspaper located in Spain, specializing in economic, financial and political news. It was established as an online newspaper in 2001. Its target readership is professional and middle-aged. It has a liberal political orientation.

It was one of the news outlets participating in the Panama Papers investigation into material leaked from the Panamanian law firm Mossack Fonseca.

== History ==
The newspaper works in partnership with the International Consortium of Investigative Journalists and, in an exclusive joint report with La Sexta, published the names on the Falciani List or the Panama Papers.

== Branches ==
The newspaper has various branches outside Madrid: in Barcelona, Valencia, Seville, Málaga, Galicia and the Basque Country.
