= El Cultural =

Spanish magazine

- Categories: Culture
- Country: Spain
- Based in: Madrid
- Language: Spanish
- Website: www.elcultural.es
- ISSN: 1576-6950
- OCLC: 436765158

El Cultural is a Spanish weekly magazine dedicated to arts and culture. It is based in Madrid. It was a weekly supplement of La Razón. It later was one of the weekly supplements of El Mundo, as a part of Unidad Editorial S.A.

In 2021, it parted ways with El Mundo, later partnering (in its online version) with El Español.

It contains a scientist section. The editor-in-chief is Blanca Berasátegui. As of 2022, El Cultural is the cultural section of El Español, which it has joined; however, El Cultural publishes an independent print edition, for sale at newsstands.
