= ALMA (union) =

Spanish trade union

- Autores Literarios de Medios Audiovisuales
- Founded: 1989
- Headquarters: Gran Vía, 62, Madrid, Spain
- Affiliations: IAWG

ALMA (Autores Literarios de Medios Audiovisuales; lit. 'Literary Authors of Audiovisual Media') is a Spanish trade union which represents writers in the fields of film and television in both fiction and non-fiction works. It was founded in 1989. Rafael Azcona, Agustín Díaz Yanes, Manolo Matji, Lola Salvador, José María González-Sinde, Carmen Rico Godoy, and Joaquín Oristrell were among the founding members.

In 2013, the National Securities Market Commission (CNMV) punished ALMA with €36,000 for publishing a table of indicative rates for its affiliates. In 2015, ALMA partnered with The Black List. ALMA joined the International Affiliation of Writers Guilds (IAWG) in 2019. It had been previously involved as observer member from 2016 to 2018. The organization established the ALMA Awards in collaboration with DAMA to recognize excellence in the works of its affiliates. In 2025, ALMA raised concerns about professional intrusion when non-screenwriting individuals hijack the credit of "creator" of television series.
