= El Español =

Spanish online newspaper

- Type: Online newspaper
- Founders: María Ramírez; Eduardo Suárez; Pedro J. Ramírez; Eva Fernández
- Publisher: El León de El Español Publicaciones S.A.
- President: Pedro J. Ramírez
- Founded: 7 October 2015; 10 years ago
- Language: Spanish
- Headquarters: Madrid
- Country: Spain
- Website: www.elespanol.com

El Español is a Spanish online newspaper that started in 2015. It has its headquarters in Avenida de Burgos, 16D, 7º, Madrid, Comunidad de Madrid. As of April 2025, it has the largest digital reach among all newspapers in Spain, averaging more than 3 million views per day and about 20 million unique users per month.

== History ==
In 2014, Pedro J. Ramírez was dismissed as the director from the newspaper El Mundo. Alongside his daughter María Ramírez Fernández, he founded El Español. The website was opened on 11 January 2015.

On 10 January 2015, it raised €3,600,000 from 5,624 people in two months through crowdfunding. On 10 April 2015, it transformed into a public limited company (Sociedad Anónima), with a share capital of €17 million.

In December 2017, El Español acquired a significant stake in Vandal, a leading Spanish video game website, expanding its presence into entertainment and digital media.

As of April 2025, El Español holds the largest digital audience among Spanish newspapers, solidifying its position as a leader in online journalism in Spain.

== Editorial approach and reputation ==
El Español is recognized for its independent editorial stance, reflecting founder Pedro J. Ramírez's commitment to challenging traditional media structures. Upon its launch in 2015, Ramírez emphasized the outlet's mission to be "independent of any political, economic, and institutional power," aiming to compete in scope and influence with legacy media while avoiding the "heavy structures of the traditional print outlets."

The publication combines traditional reporting with multimedia formats, including podcasts, videos, and investigative journalism. This approach aligns with the growing preference among Spanish-language audiences for investigative content delivered through diverse media channels.

Adopting a digital-first model, El Español leverages real-time updates and social media platforms to engage with its audience. The outlet's proactive use of platforms like Twitter and Facebook has been instrumental in building a substantial online community, with its Twitter account surpassing 524,000 followers by January 2025.
