= The Yellow World =

2008 book by Albert Espinosa

- The Yellow World
- Author: Albert Espinosa
- Original title: El Mundo Amarillo
- Language: English and Spanish
- Genre: Semi biographical
- Published: 2008
- Publisher: Grijalbo
- ISBN: 8425342007

The Yellow World (Spanish: El Mundo Amarillo) is a semi-autobiographical work by Albert Espinosa. The book details the author's experience with cancer and describes his hospital experience. Written as a series of twenty-three discoveries made by the author during his ten-year fight against cancer, Espinosa describes the people he met during his stay in the hospital, recalling those who inspired him. In the last chapters of the book, Espinosa describes such people as "Yellows" – people who make a significant impact on one's life and help transform it for the better.

== Contents ==
The book begins with the author asking the question, "Where were you born?" The author answers his question by stating that he was "born from cancer." Espinosa states that he likes the word cancer, and even likes the word tumor because he grew up listening to those words. Espinosa then proceeds to explain his history with cancer: "I was fourteen years old when I had to go to the hospital for the first time. I had an osteosarcoma in my left leg. I left school, left my home, and started my life at the hospital. I had cancer for ten years, from the ages of fourteen to twenty-four. This doesn’t mean that I spent ten years in the hospital but that for ten years I was going to different hospitals to get treated for four cancers: leg, leg (same leg both times), lung, and liver."

Espinosa describes this period of cancer treatment as one of the best times of his life and a time when he was happy. He states that cancer can help a person discover who they are, understand their limits and cease fearing death. He then goes on to describe a list of discoveries he made and how they shaped his life. Espinosa explains, "Every point, every discovery, is connected with one of the phrases I heard during my hospital life. They’re things people said to me while I was ill and that had such an effect on me that I’ve never forgotten them. They’re like extracts from a poem, or the beginnings of songs, sentiments that will always smell of chemotherapy, or bandages, or waiting for visits or roommates in their blue pyjamas."

The list of discoveries is laid out as chapters for the book in which each discovery is the title for that specific chapter. Some of the discoveries include "Losses are positive," "The word pain doesn’t exist," and "Don’t be afraid of being the person you have become," among many others. This list includes advice he was given during the time he was in the hospital, and contains many of his realizations about life.

== Adaptations ==
=== Book adaptation ===
The translation rights for the book have been bought by twenty countries, including the United States, Great Britain, Italy, France, the Netherlands, Germany, Finland, Norway, Japan, Taiwan, Slovakia, Korea, Greece, Portugal, Turkey, Bulgaria, Hungary and Brazil.

=== TV adaptation ===
Based on this book, the author created a script for a TV show called Polseres Vermelles. In this show, Espinosa showed his childhood experiences by telling the story of a group of kids who meet in the children's wing of a hospital. Polseres Vermelles was initially thought to be a small project to last only one season, but the show became so popular that a second season was done.

The American television network Fox aired the English adaptation titled Red Band Society on September 17, 2014. The American show lasted one season, and then was cancelled.

The Italian version Braccialetti Rossi became a prime-time ratings success with over 5.7 million viewers during its second season. The show is scheduled for a third season.

Other TV adaptations of the show include the German version Red Bracelets, which won best series at the 2018 International Kids Emmy Awards.

== Awards ==
For his work on the TV show Polseres Vermelles

- 2011- Best Writer Award at the Seoul International Drama Awards
- 2011- Special mention for Best Series in the Prix Europe (The European Broadcasting Festival)
