= ETSEIB Motorsport =

Student motorsports team

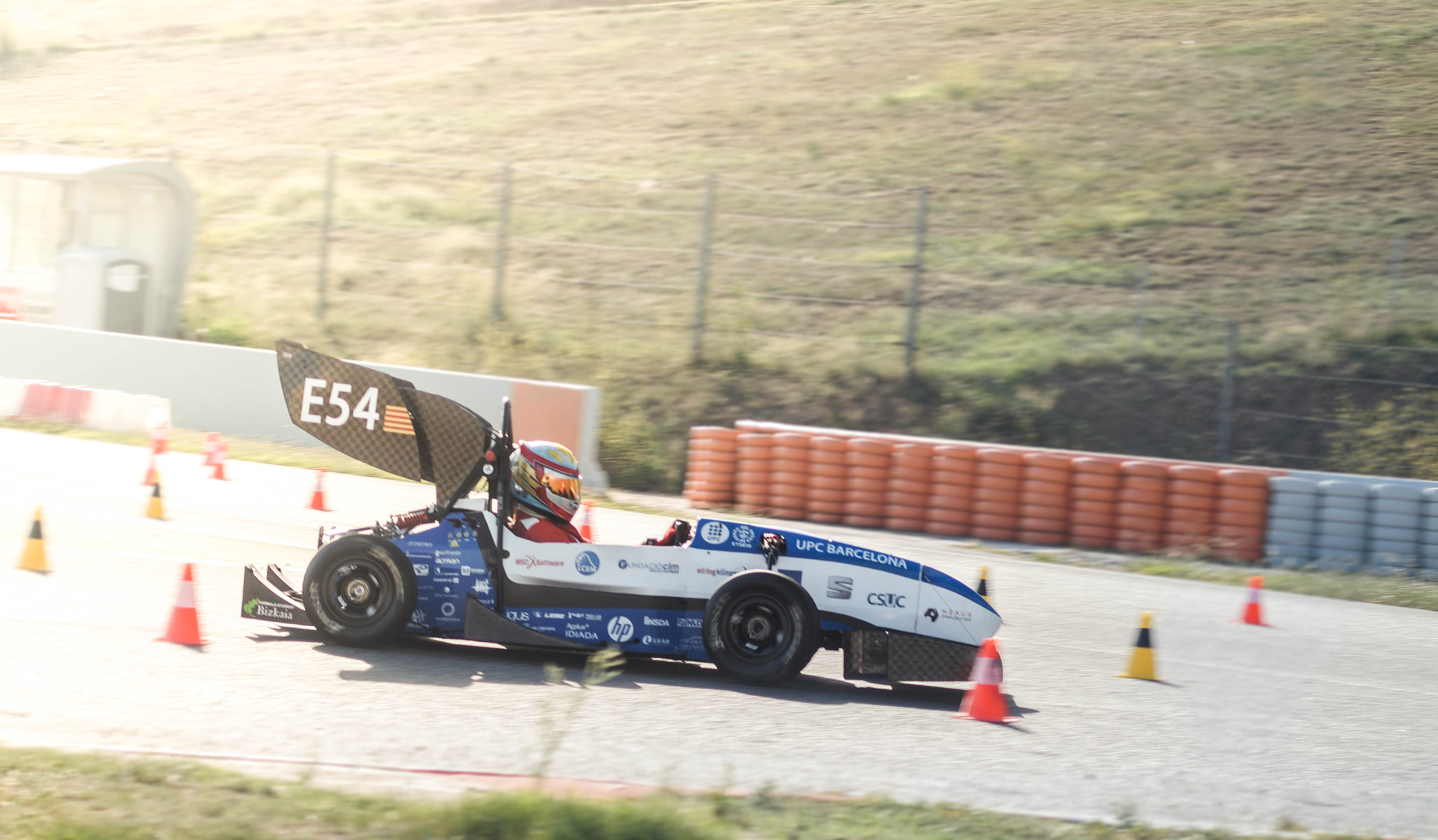
CAT08e during an endurance event at Montmeló

ETSEIB Motorsport is a motorsports team that represents the School of Industrial Engineering of Barcelona (ETSEIB) in the Formula Student competition. The team designs and constructs open-wheel cars to compete globally against other university teams.

== Vehicles ==
=== CAT01 ===
The 2007–2008 season was the inaugural season for the ETSEIB Motorsport team. To be officially recognized by the school, three teachers were assigned as project coordinators to support the team's legitimacy.

The team designed and built a car to compete in Formula Student and named it CAT01. It was taken to the Formula Student competitions organized at Silverstone and the Hockenheimring; at Silverstone, the CAT01 finished 53rd out of 72 entries, while it finished 52nd out of 78 entries at Hockenheim. The results were poor compared to those of teams who finished before them, but were deemed positive as it was the first year a Spanish team finalized dynamic tests.

=== CAT02 ===
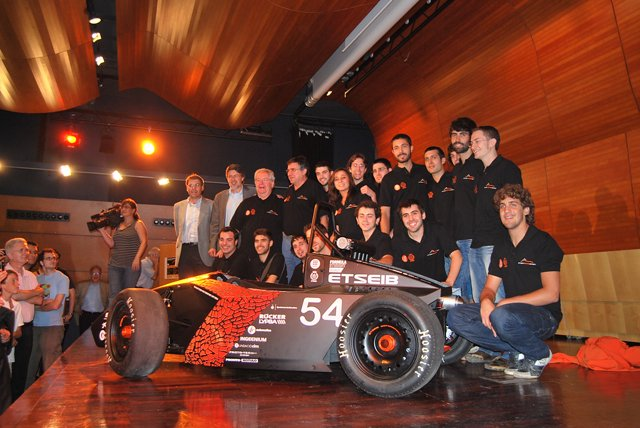
Launch of CAT02 in 2009

The second car, CAT02, was created during the team's second season in 2009. As the team could only reuse a few parts from CAT01, almost all the components were new for the season. The team had sixteen members, with a majority of the team returning from the previous season.

The CAT02 improved the chassis by building a self-supporting structure constructed of honeycomb aluminum plates to allow for a more streamlined design. The vehicle's weight was reduced to 250 kg (550 lb) by using lighter materials for components such as the carbon fibre suspension control arms.

The team planned to compete in three competitions, improve static analysis results, and complete dynamic events. However, time constraints hindered the team's performance; they were not ready in time to compete in the first race at Silverstone, and also could not complete dynamic tests in Italy and Germany. In the latter two events, the CAT02 placed 23rd out of a total of 39 entries and 62nd from a total of 78 entries respectively. It won two static analysis awards—a second-place style award in Germany and a third-place cost analysis award in Italy.

=== CAT03 ===
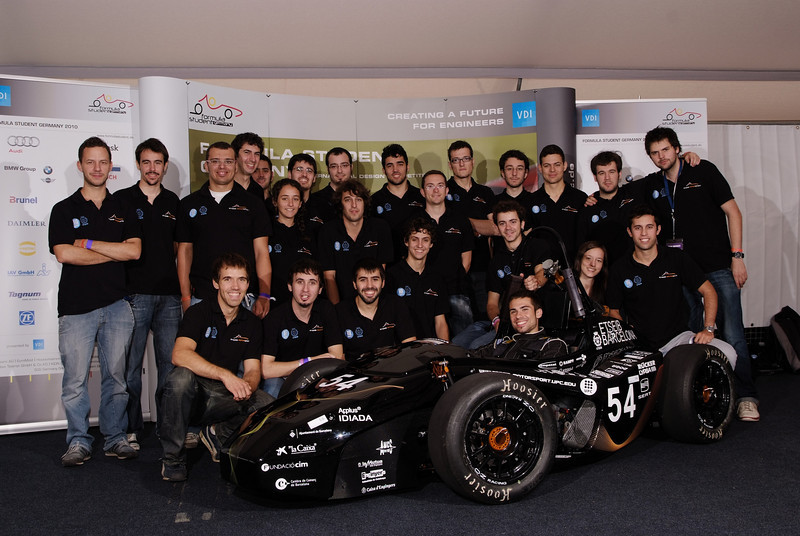
The ETSEIB Motorsport team with CAT03 in 2010

ETSEIB Motorsport's third car, the CAT03, participated in the 2010 season. The team grew to 25 members. The goal to reduce weight remained—while the end product had a similar weight to its predecessor, the chassis' rigidity was improved with steel tubing. The main improvement over the CAT02 was the suspension system, where the same technology was used despite problems with the use of adhesives on steel tubing. After several tests, the team was able to eliminate problems from previous years.

The CAT03 entered three races in Germany, Italy and Spain; results were comparatively better to previous seasons, especially in Italy, where the CAT03 finished in twelfth place.

=== CAT04 ===
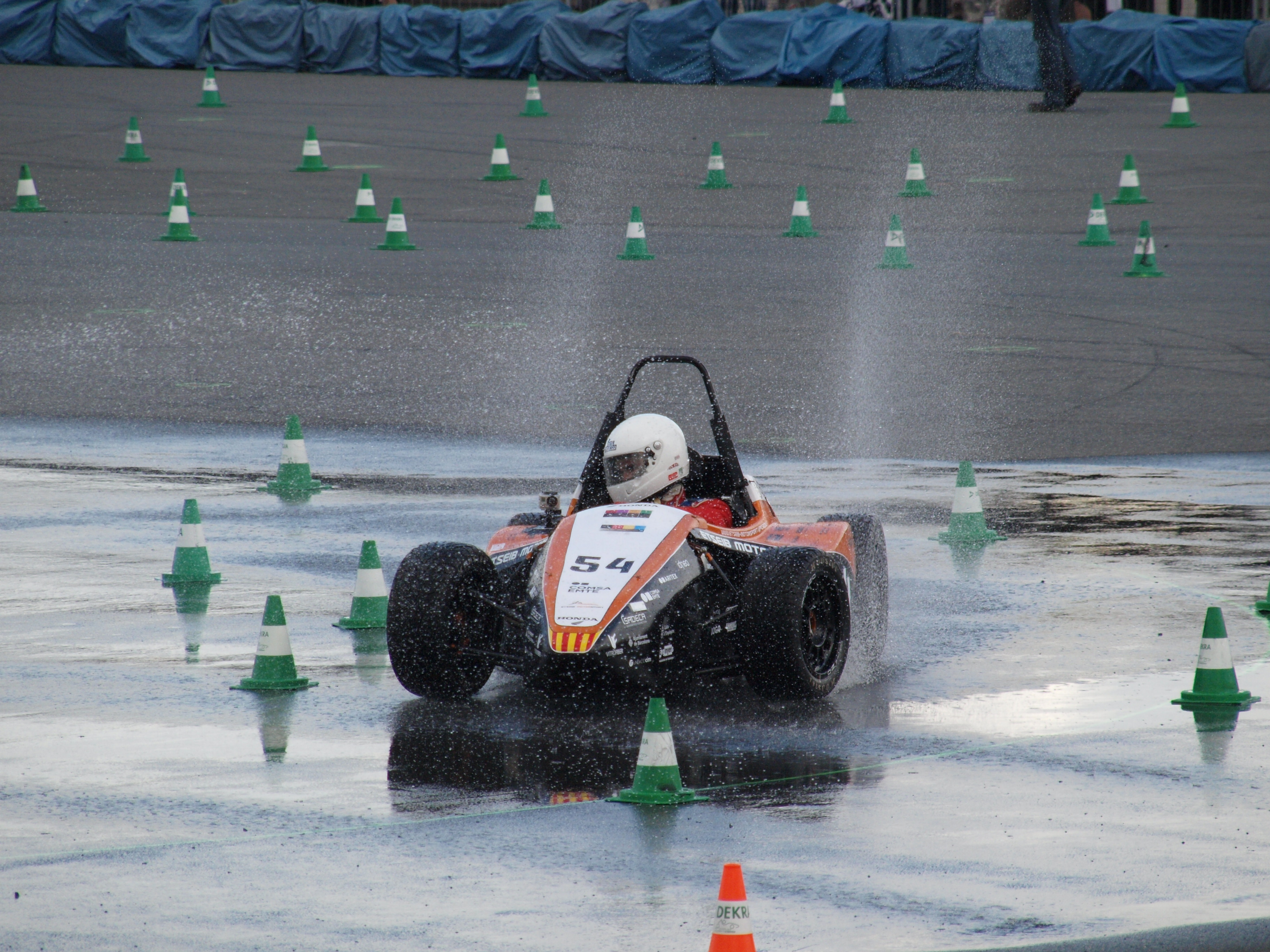
CAT04 on a skidpad in Germany

In 2011, ETSEIB Motorsport's fourth vehicle, CAT04, was constructed. The goal for CAT04 was to improve its reliability and performance. Initially, the team's strategy was to create a direct evolution of the previous model without significantly changing the chassis design. They focused on redesigning areas that caused the most problems with the previous car; more new components were built than in previous years to reduce the car's weight by 20 kg (44 lb).

That season, the team participated in three competitions. In Austria, they finished 19th in their class and won a cost analysis award. In Germany, the team finished in 21st place.

=== CAT05e ===
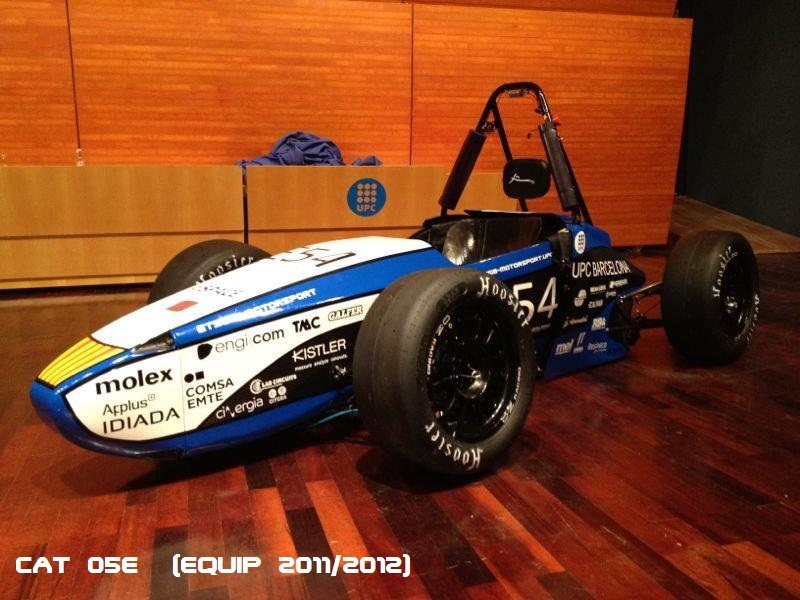
CAT05e at launch in 2011

In 2011, ETSEIB Motorsport replaced internal combustion engines with electric propulsion. The new car was called CAT05e, with the "e" referring to its electric powertrain.

The objectives of the 2011–2012 season were to design, build, and prepare an electric car—a challenge for the 25 students, who had no previous experience with electric race cars. As a result of the change in powertrain, the team intended to reduce weight by 20 kg. Two independent motors were used for better traction and stability.

That year, the team participated in three competitions. In Germany, problems arose from insufficient testing, but the team took second place in cost analysis. Results improved in Spain, where the team finished in eleventh place. In Italy, they finished in ninth place, and an acceleration test yielded a time of 4.4 s.

=== CAT06e ===
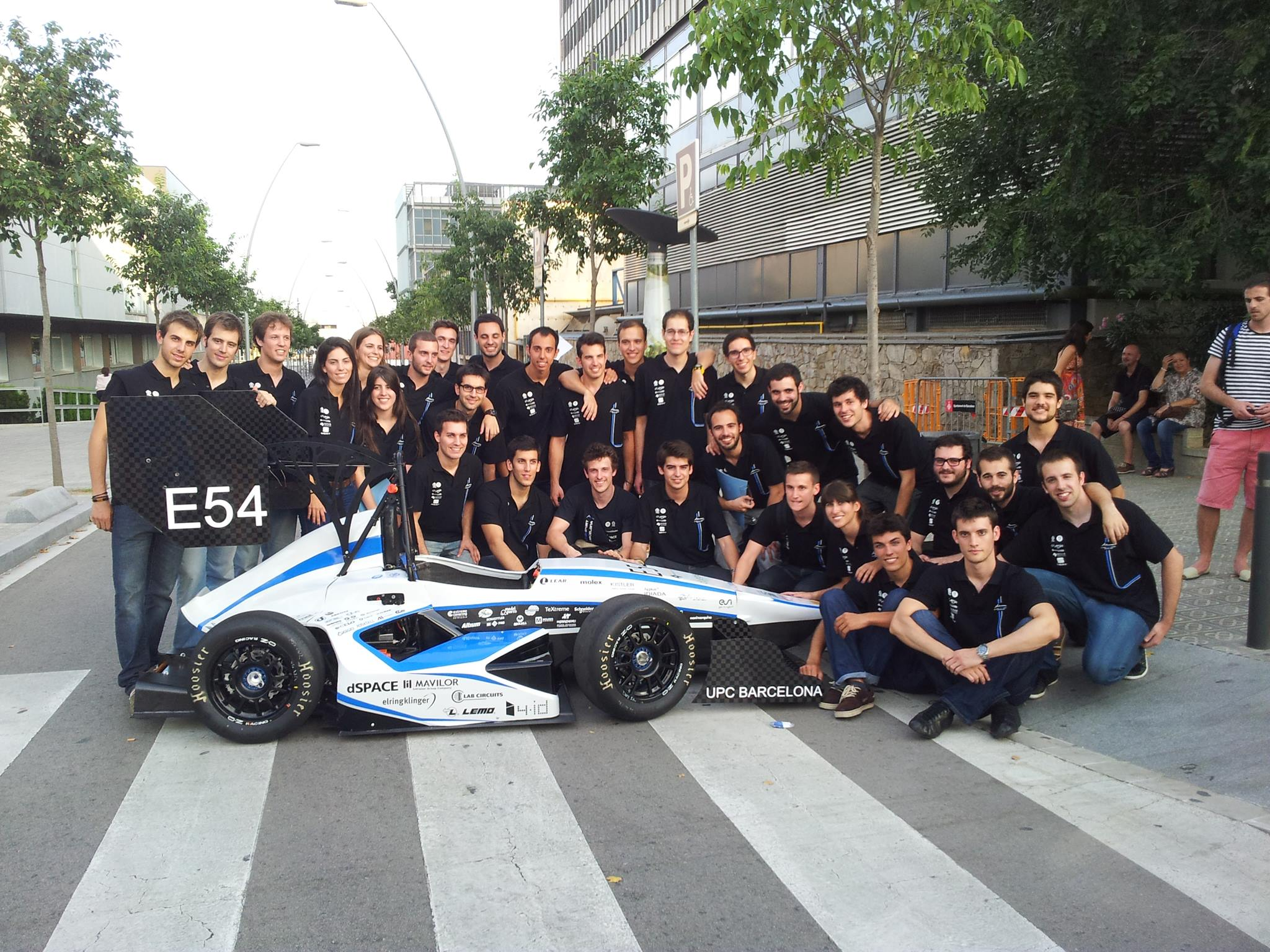
Rollout of CAT06e

CAT06e, ETSEIB's second electric car, was developed during the 2012–2013 season. 35 students were involved in the new electric prototype.

The plans for the CAT06e was to refine the previous model and improve both reliability and performance. The CAT06e was ETSEIB's first car to incorporate aerodynamic elements. The team focused on areas which had caused more problems in recent competitions while redesigning and optimizing other parts. More components were designed and manufactured in-house, including the carbon fiber monocoque and inverters.

As in previous years, ETSEIB Motorsport participated in competitions at Germany, Spain, and Italy. At Hockenheim, they placed 24th and won the gold medal in Cost Analysis. In the second competition, Spain, they won the gold and bronze medals in Efficiency and Cost Analysis respectively. They placed 16th in Italy.

=== CAT07e ===
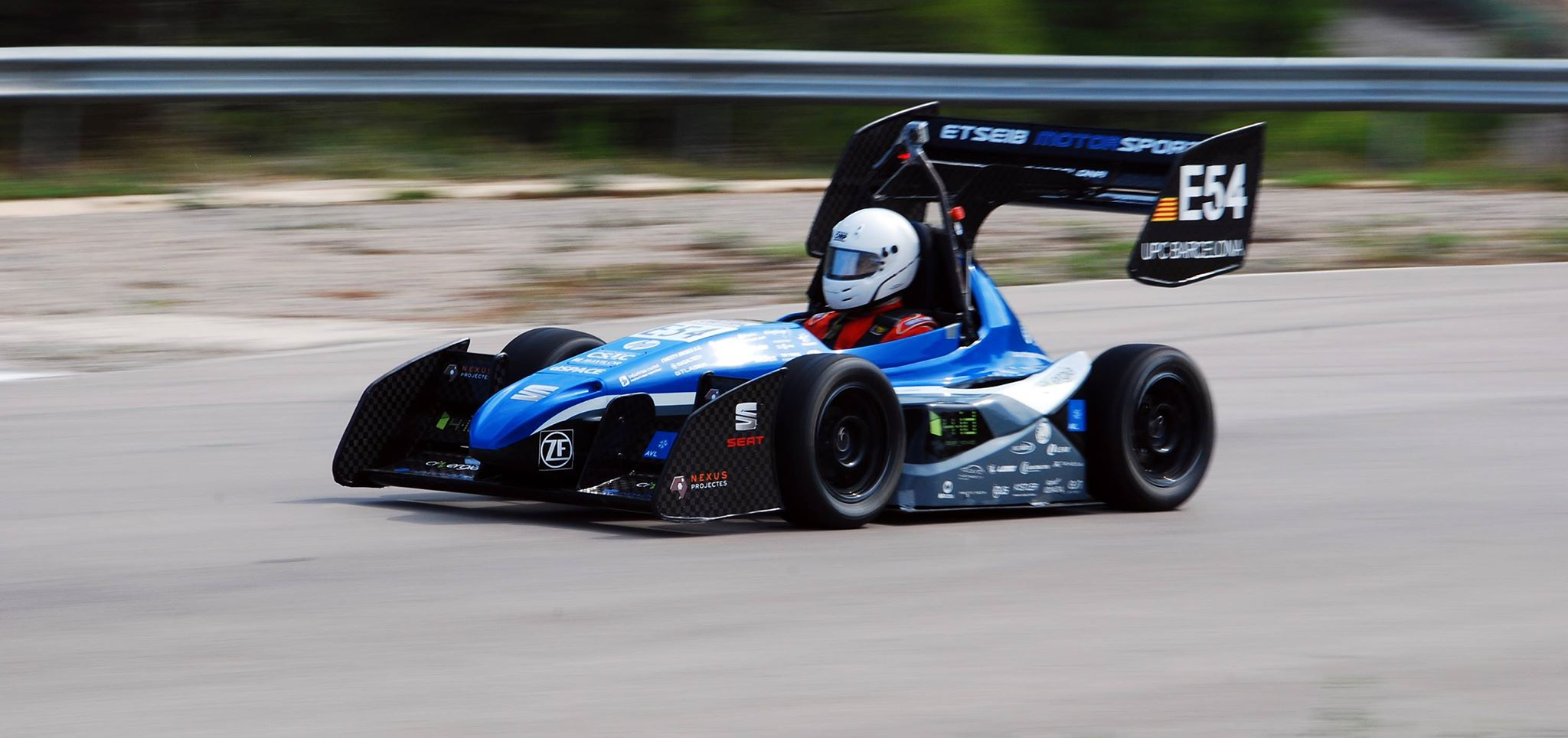
CAT07e being tested

During the 2013–14 season, ETSEIB Motorsport built another electric car: the CAT07e. The goals for this vehicle were to reduce the vehicle's weight and improve its inverters and electronics. The chassis, like the CAT06e, consists of a fibre monocoque with a tubular steel subframe.

The team participated in three events during the season: Germany, Spain and, the Czech Republic. The first competition was held in Germany, where the team could not participate in the dynamic events but scored 24th overall. A couple of weeks after, the team travelled to the Czech Republic and placed third in the overall standings due to taking first place in the Business Plan and Cost Analysis category and second place in Design. Finally, the team participated in the fifth Formula Student competition held in Montmelo Circuit, Barcelona, and scored high in the static tests, such as taking third place in the Business Plan category.

=== CAT08e ===
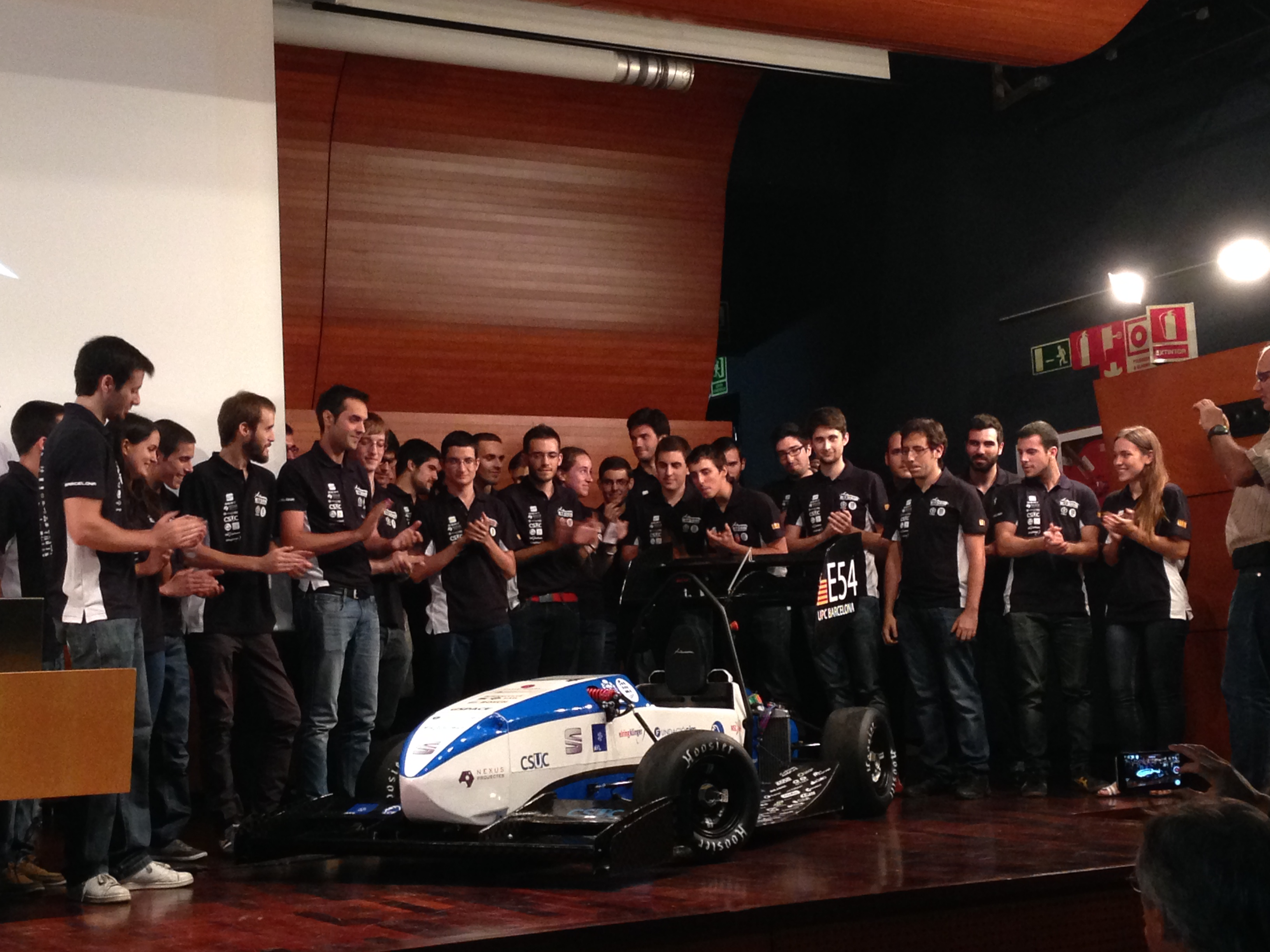
Launch of CAT08e in 2015

The CAT08e is the fourth electric car built by the ETSEIB Motorsport. It included the design and construction of the first integrated carbon fibre monocoque within the Spanish Formula Student teams. Its wheel size was reduced from 13 to 10 inches, and a more powerful engine was installed.

Due to the lack of time needed to test the CAT08e in Germany, the team was only able to participate in the static events, taking 23rd place overall. At the end of August, and after performing the necessary changes and adjustments on the car, the team participated in the sixth Formula Student Spain competition, where the team placed third in the Business Plan Event and were able to complete all the events. ETSEIB Motorsport was proclaimed the best Spanish electrical team.
