= Albert Espinosa =

Spanish screenwriter and playwright

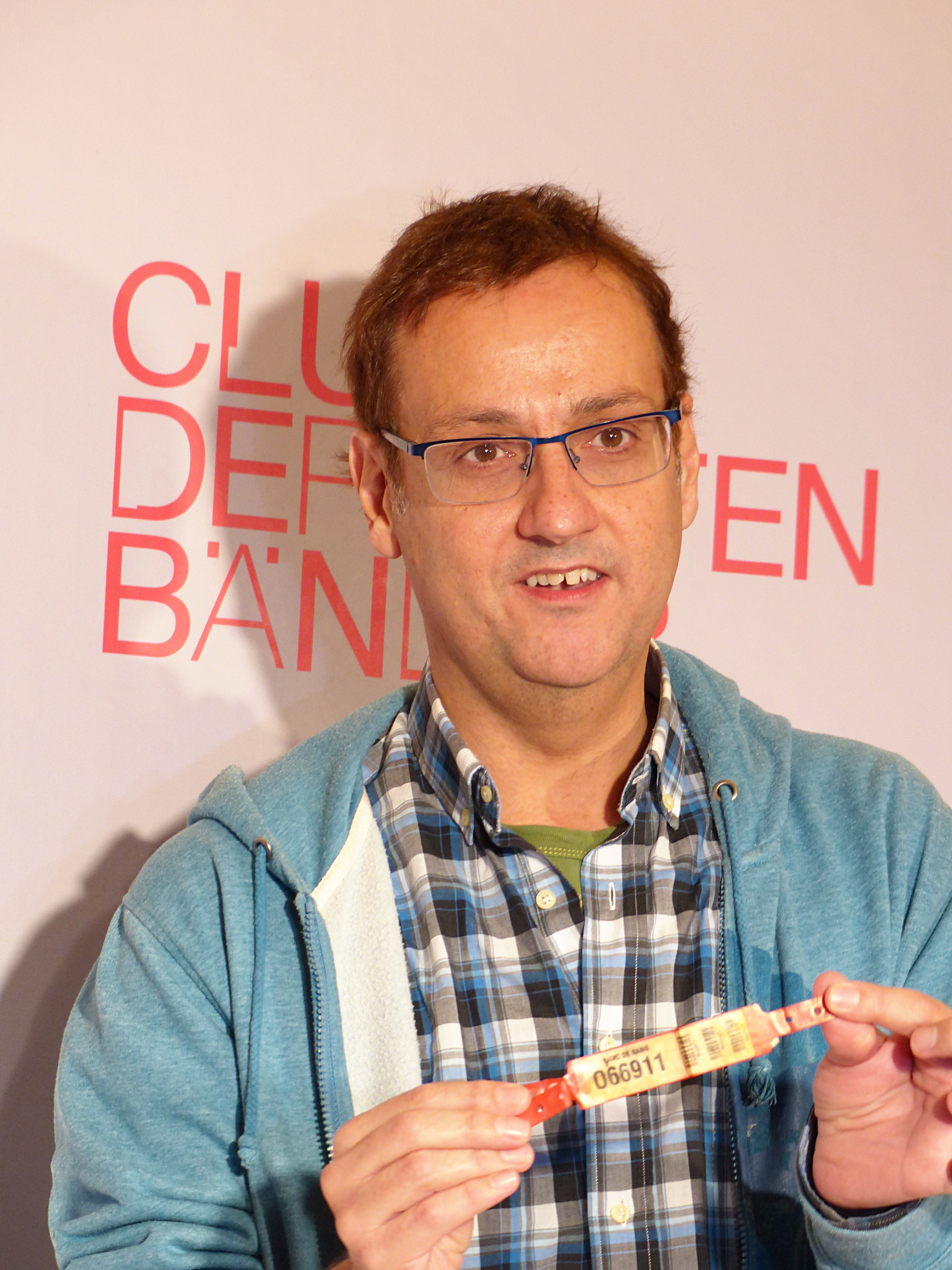
- Espinosa in 2016
- Born: Albert Espinosa i Puig; 5 November 1973 (age 52); Barcelona, Spain
- Occupations: screenwriter, playwright, journalist, director and actor

Albert Espinosa i Puig (Catalan pronunciation: [əlˈβɛɾt əspiˈnozə i ˈputʃ]; born 5 November 1973), educated as an industrial engineer, is a Spanish screenwriter, playwright, writer, actor and director of cinema. He also works as a newspaper columnist at El Periódico de Catalunya.

== Biography ==
Espinosa was born in Barcelona, Spain, on 5 November 1973. At the age of 14, he was diagnosed with cancer and spent the next ten years in and out of hospitals. He lost a leg, a lung and part of his liver. Espinosa's memoir The Yellow World is an account of his battle with cancer. At the age of 24, he left hospital to train as an industrial engineer at Technical School of Industrial Engineering in Barcelona (ETSEIB), part of the Polytechnic University of Catalonia. It was at this time that he began to write screenplays and act in television series for Televisió de Catalunya.

The author of several screenplays and novels, he has also written and acted in plays and television series. He is also director, writer and stage actor in his theater company Pelones and a columnist for El Periódico de Catalunya.

His work has been described as combining the fantastic, tenderness and humour. Espinosa's experiences of growing up in hospital have marked his creative work; "I always say that I have to live my life as well as those of my friends who did not beat cancer. I'm living 4.7 lives".

== Career ==
=== Beginnings ===
Espinosa began writing in his college years, at first by writing the plays the group performed, many of them Shakespearean-inspired (including texts and transcriptions of the actors' improvisations), others focusing on autobiographical themes (such as his play 'Los Pelones', premiered at the Riereta Teatre in Barcelona in July 1995, which was the seed of what years later would become his first movie script 'Planta 4ª') as well as other works set in a university context, such as 'Un novato en la ETSEIB' After completing his studies, he formed with classmates and theater group ETSEIB the theater company "The Pelones" (referring endearing to the eponymous piece cited above, this group of pediatric cancer patients, all bald by the effects of chemotherapy, which was part Espinosa himself in his years of hospital stay), which even today is still active.

=== First jobs in television ===
Unlike the other members of "The Pelones," Espinosa never worked as an engineer. After finishing his studies, his first paid screenplay (1998) was for a video that won the European Prize for Information Technology.

He recovered fully from his illness (at twenty-four), thanks to the previous experience of writing short plays and scripts that he had acquired during his college years. He began working as a writer for television programs and contests, mostly for the Catalan producers, Gestmusic, an activity which he combined with his role as a playwright and as an actor in the theater company "The Pelones". Espinosa himself confessed that what he most liked was acting, but that he was only offered jobs as a television scriptwriter. That's why when he started working in television (his first program was the children's program Club Super3 for Catalan television), he set himself the challenge of changing jobs every six months to avoid burnout in a fast moving world. Then came a time that the author himself admits, he had doubts about whether to return to his other vocation (Engineering), his doubts were dispelled after working in Xat TV (1999–2000), one of the youth magazine 2 emitted in Catalonia definitely anchored him to the world of the screenwriter. It is also noteworthy that period their collaboration as a writer on the sitcom Psycho Express (2001–2002), created for TV3 by the Catalan company Dagoll Dagom musical theater, in the long-running series of Television of Catalonia El cor de la ciutat, whose team worked for a year and a half (2002–2003), its first screenwriting job for a number of daily broadcast, in the 3rd season of the comedy series Majoria absoluta (2003–2004), which marked his first collaboration with writer-director Joaquin Oristrell, and in the telefilm Tempus fugit (2003), winner of the Amsterdam Festival, SAG Awards 2004, at the Manchester Festival and the Monte Carlo Television Festival 2004.

=== Cinema and theater ===
However, the true consecration of Espinosa's talent as a writer came with the film 4th Floor (2003), directed by Antonio Mercero and starring Juan José Ballesta. In this work, marked autobiographical, the author recounts with tenderness and humor, in a tone away from the drama and tragedy, the everyday experience in a hospital of a group of children suffering from cancer. The film premiered at festivals, was nominated for the prize for best film at the XVIII edition of the Goya Awards from the Academy of Arts and Cinematographic Sciences of Spain.

Later, still trying to break into the world of film, television continued, with works like the script for the TV series Abuela de verano (Summer Spanish Grandmother) (2005), based on the novel Diario de una abuela de verano (Diary of a summer grandmother) writer Rosa Regas and starring Rosa Maria Sarda, in which he intervened in a supporting role (it was his first job as an actor and screenwriter simultaneous).

In 2006 lives his most prolific year as a screenwriter and as a playwright. The 23 February debuts in the alternative theater comedy Barcelona Tantarantana Idaho and Utah (lullabies for babies unwell), written, directed and starring Espinosa himself, and set in a near future where he invents a pill to stop sleep indefinitely. The play was revived in April 2007 in Madrid (National Drama Centre). Also premiered that year (April and October) were two films with his script. The first is your life in 65', directed by Maria Ripoll and adapted from a play by Espinosa, which tells a story in which death and chance intertwine constantly. For the script of this film, Espinosa was awarded at the Sixth Edition of the Barcelona Cinema. The other film released that year was going to be that Nobody is Perfect, directed by and starring Joaquin Oristrell Santi Millán, Fernando Tejero and José Luis García Pérez, who at the time was surrounded by some controversy for alleged plagiarism of a previous script Strawberry Caesar. His latter film, which won a Special Mention at the Ciutat de Barcelona Prize, portrays the physical disability issues as a daily, which should be considered normal vision banishing exclusive. Finally, in December was released in the Teatre Nacional de Catalunya, the work The great secret, co-written with Joan Font. A children's adaptation of this work, entitled The petit secret, would be released on 9 January 2007, and the original work arrived in Madrid (Teatro Gran Via) in March 2007.

In May 2007, started shooting the film, released in October the following year, Espinosa would debut as a film director: Do not ask me to kiss you, because I'll kiss, a comedy starring Eloy Azorin and based on the work homonymous theater (released in January 2004) and in another piece titled the club will palles (straws club) (premiered at the National Theatre of Catalonia in March 2004), both composed by Espinosa for the company itself "The Pelones". Also in 2007 the company begins a theater turn with the work Idaho and Utah (lullabies for bad children).

In 2009, Albert Espinosa presented the Teatre Lliure comedy "El fascinant noi que treia la llengua quan feia treballs manuals" (Catalan: The fascinating boy who stuck his tongue out when he did manual labor), again written, directed and starring himself, but this time, for the first time, without the group "Los Pelones". Made up the cast, along with the very Espinosa, Roger Berruez, Juanma Falcón and Oscar Blanco. The author's intention is to adapt this work to the movies also.

In the summer of 2009 is shot in various locations of the coast and the interior of Catalonia, the film Herois a very personal film project the producer Luis de Val, Media Films, and director Pau Freixas had prepared for three years. Espinosa co-authored the script with Freixas himself. In April 2010, the film won the Silver Biznaga-Audience Award and the award for best costume at the XIII Edition of the Spanish Film Festival in Malaga.

=== Literature ===
Espinosa is a best-selling author, and has published four books: The Yellow World (2008), Everything You and I Could Have Been If We Were Not You and I (2010), the successful novel If You Tell Me To Come I'll Drop Everything...But Tell Me To Come (2011), which was the best selling book on the traditional holiday of Sant Jordi in Barcelona. And finally his new book, Compasses That Seek Lost Smiles (2013).

The Yellow World is a memoir about Espinosa's years with cancer. Of it, he said: 'I do not talk about cancer, I talk about what I learned from cancer, everything it taught me for everyday life.'

=== Recent works in television and radio ===
In 2010 he embarked on a new project with Pau Freixas, director of Héroes (2009), the television series Polseres vermelles (known in English as The Red Band Society), created by Espinosa himself. The story and the script are the responsibility of the author and Pau Freixas is responsible for the direction, the series is also co-produced by both.

Polseres vermelles tells the everyday story of a group of teenagers who meet at a hospital because of their illnesses, and talks, always with humor and tenderness, the value of friendship, the will to live and the desire to excel. As it did in the movie 4th Floor (2003), Albert Espinosa used his own life experience to recreate the Polseres vermelles hospital environment.

The original script, based on the aforementioned novel The Yellow World (2008), by Espinosa himself is designed for four seasons, and time series (co-produced by Castelao Productions and Television of Catalonia) after the remarkable success of audience and critical of the 1st season (issued between January and May 2011, the regional channel TV3), already renewed for a second, which would consist of 15 new episodes. In addition, the 1st season was dubbed into Castilian and issuance began 9 July 2012 in Antena 3 with a large audience, surpassing even the harvested data in Catalonia with the original pass.

Besides Season 2 of Polseres vermelles, currently Espinosa is preparing a movie: 5th Floor, a kind of sequel to the hit 4th floor.

In National Radio Spain, he worked in the morning Affections evening program, led by Jordi Tuñón, with a weekly section about interesting scientific studies until 2012 when the program ended.

== Filmography ==
=== Television ===
- Super3 Club (children's program, 1996–1997) (writer)
- El joc de viure (series 1997) (writer)
- Xou com sou (contest, 1999) (writer)
- Xat TV (youth program, 1999–2000) (writer)
- Viladomat (series, 2000) (casting)
- Casting (contest, 2000) (writer)
- The Bus (reality show, 2000) (writer)
- Acrobats and clowns (documentary, 2001) (writer)
- Psycho Express (series, 2001–2002) (writer)
- El cor de la Ciutat (Series 2002–2003) (writer from seasons 2 to 4)
- Histories of Catalonia (documentary, March 2003) (writer)
- Tempus fugit (TV movie, 2003) (writer)
- Jet Lag (Series 2003–2004) (writer seasons 3–4)
- Majoria absoluta (series, 2003–2004) (writer of season 3)
- Autoindefinits (competition, 2004–2005) (writer)
- Buenafuente (program 2005) (writer)
- The Christmas Eve (TV movie, 2005) (actor)
- Nit Suite (TV movie, 2005) (actor)
- Summer Grandma (series, 2005) (actor and writer)
- The Holy Family (series 2010) (writer)
- Polseres vermelles (series 2010) (writer and producer)
- La Trinca: unauthorized biography (TV movie, 2011) (actor)
- Polseres vermelles, 2nd Season (ESIS, 2013) (writer and producer)
- Los espabilados (Alive and Kicking) (2021) (creator)

=== Film ===
- Floor 4a (2003) (scriptwriter)
- Your life in '65 (2006) (screenwriter)
- You're going to see that nobody is perfect (2006) (scriptwriter)
- Strong Apache (2007) (actor)
- Destination: Ireland (short, 2008) (actor and producer)
- Do not ask me to kiss you, because I will kiss you (2008) (actor and director)
- Heroes (2010) (screenwriter)
- Fifth Floor (in production) (director)

== Theatrical and literary works ==
- The Pelones (theatre, 1995)
- A rookie in the ETSEIB (theatre, 1996)
- Posthumous Words (theater, 1997)
- The Story of Marc Guerrero (theatre, 1998)
- Fragments (theater premiered at the Barcelona Teatre Malic room in September 1999).
- 4 dances (theater, premiered at Teatre Malic in Barcelona in February 2002)
- Your life in '65 (theater; premiered at Teatre Malic in Barcelona in September 2002).
- This is not life* (theatre, co-written with Sergi Belbel and David Plana for the company T de Teatre, and released in December 2013)
- Don't ask me to kiss you because I'll kiss you (theater; premiered at the alternative theater hall, Tantarantana in Barcelona in January 2004)
- The club of straw [Catalan] (theater; premiered at the Teatre Nacional de Catalunya in March 2004)
- Idaho and Utah (lullabies for naughty children) (theatre; premiered in the Hall of Alternative Theatre Tantarantana, Barcelona in February 2006).
- The great secret (theater; co-written with Joan Font and released in the National Theatre of Catalonia at December 2006).
- The little secret (theatre; co-written with Joan Font and released in January 2007).
- Our Tigers Drink Milk [Catalan] (theater; premiered at the Teatre Nacional de Catalunya in January 2013).
- The Yellow World (autobiographical fiction, 2008).
- All that we could have been you and I if we weren't you and me (Novel, 2010).
- If you tell me to come I abandon everything...but tell me to come (novel, 2011).
- Compasses that search for lost smiles (novel, 2013).

== Books translated into English ==
- The Yellow World: Trust Your Dreams and They'll Come True (2012) [translated from El Mundo Amarillo (2008)]

== Awards ==
- 2003 – Butaca prize for best theatrical text for the act Your life in '65.
- 2004 – Basque Film Award for Best Screenplay for 4th floor.
- 2004 – SAG Award for Best Screenplay for TV movie for Tempus fugit.
- 2004 – Golden Nymph for Best Screenplay at the Monte Carlo Television Festival by Tempus Fugit.
- 2006 – Award for the work BCN Theater Idaho and Utah (Lullabies for Sick Babies).
- 2007 – Award Barcelona Cinema for Best Screenplay for Your Life in 65.
