= Laia Costa =

Spanish actress (born 1985)

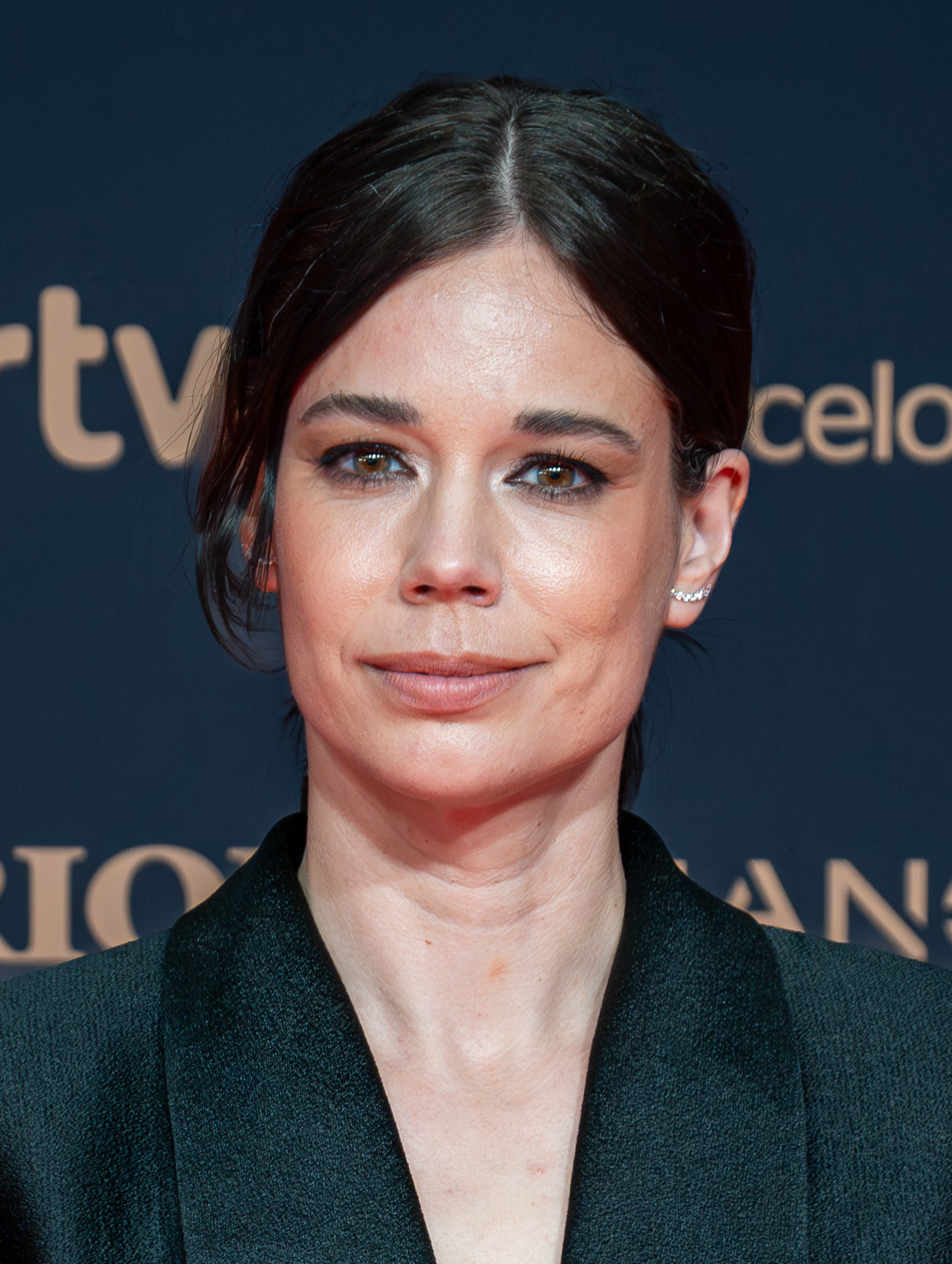
- Costa in 2026
- Born: Laia Costa Bertrán; 18 February 1985 (age 41); Barcelona, Catalonia, Spain
- Occupation: Actress
- Years active: 2011–present
- Partner: David López
- Children: 2

Laia Costa Bertrán (Catalan: [ˈlajə ˈkɔstə]; born 18 February 1985) is a Spanish actress from Catalonia. Known for her work in international film and television productions, Costa has won several accolades, including a Goya Award, two Platino Awards and a German Film Award, in addition to nominations for a British Academy Film Award and a European Film Award.

Costa earned a degree in advertising, public relations and marketing, as well as a PhD in political science and media studies, before starting her acting career at the age of 26. Following initial appearances in minor television roles in Spain, she achieved international recognition through her portrayal of the titular character in the critically acclaimed one-shot German thriller Victoria (2015). Her performance earned her the Best Actress in a Leading Role at the German Film Awards 2015, making her the first foreign and only Spanish actress to secure a Lola. Costa later starred in the romantic dramas Newness (2017) and Only You (2018), the multi-narrative drama Life Itself (2018), and the romantic comedy Duck Butter (2018).

For taking the lead in HBO Spain's eight-episode romance series Foodie Love (2019), Costa received a nomination for a Feroz Award for Best Main Actress in a Series. She was also part of the cast in the first season of the financial drama Devils (2020). Also in 2020, she made an appearance in the science fiction television anthology series Soulmates. Costa garnered widespread acclaim for her portrayal of Amaia, a new mother in Alauda Ruiz de Azúa's Lullaby (2022). This performance earned her the top accolades of the season, including a Goya Award, a Feroz Award, a Forqué Award, and a Platino Award, as well as receiving a nomination for a CEC Award. She has since starred in the rural drama Un amor (2023), the Amazon Prime Video high fantasy series The Wheel of Time (2023–2025), and the supernatural horror Lee Cronin's The Mummy (2026).

== Early life and education ==
Laia Costa was born on 18 February 1985 in Barcelona, to José María Costa, an accountant, and Cristina Bertrán, one of Barcelona's first female taxi drivers. She grew up in Horta. The elder daughter in a family of two girls, her younger sister is Noemí Costa, also an actress and architect. She attended the Salesian College San Juan Bosco Horta.

Costa considers her foray into acting as an accident, since she never considered becoming an actress when she was growing up in Spain, she affirms that she had no role models and when she had to decide which profession to study, acting was not valued as a possibility. She played basketball from a young age for 17 years, playing for the Hispano Francés sports club at the point guard position. Regarding her experience in sports, Costa recalls "it has given me many values that I have not found elsewhere, at least not in such a pure form. Teamwork, to begin with."

She obtained a degree in advertising, public relations, and marketing at the Blanquerna-Ramon Llull University's School of Communication and International Relations. After graduating, Costa worked for marketing agencies as an account executive at Mr. John Sample without set hours and later for a German company with strict ins and outs. Because of this, she had more free time and decided to take theatre classes with her sister at the Nancy Tuñón School in Barcelona.

Costa took different acting courses and eventually took casting director Luci Lenox's Acting in English course at the Frank Stien Studio for two years. She speaks fluent Catalan, Spanish, French, and English.

== Career ==
=== Early work and international breakthrough (2011-2020) ===
Costa starred in the music video for Portrait's song "Today Is the Day." She made her television debut as Inés Flores in the 2011 daily television series Bandolera, followed by an episodic appearance in the 2012 historical drama television series Toledo. That same year, she made her film debut as a background 'Chica Serpiente' in the drama film I Want You.

The following year, Costa starred as Rym, a girl with breast cancer, who becomes the roommate of Lleó, portrayed by Àlex Monner, in the second season of the television show Polseres vermelles, winner of the International Emmy Award for Best Kids TV Series, adapted by Steven Spielberg for North America as Red Band Society; and in La Bien Querida's music video for her song "Arenas Movedizas". On stage, later that year, she was cast as Maria Kapravof in her first professional play, Atraco, paliza y muerte en Agbanäspach by Nao Albet and Marcel Borràs at the Teatre Nacional de Catalunya. For the role, Costa, whose text was entirely written in German, learned it by heart. Nuvol remarked, "It's surprising how Laia Costa's conviction as a somewhat hipster-esque femme fatale, plays her role entirely in German". This led to a role as Claudia in the short film Y otro año, perdices, and as Alba in the period drama television series The Time in Between.

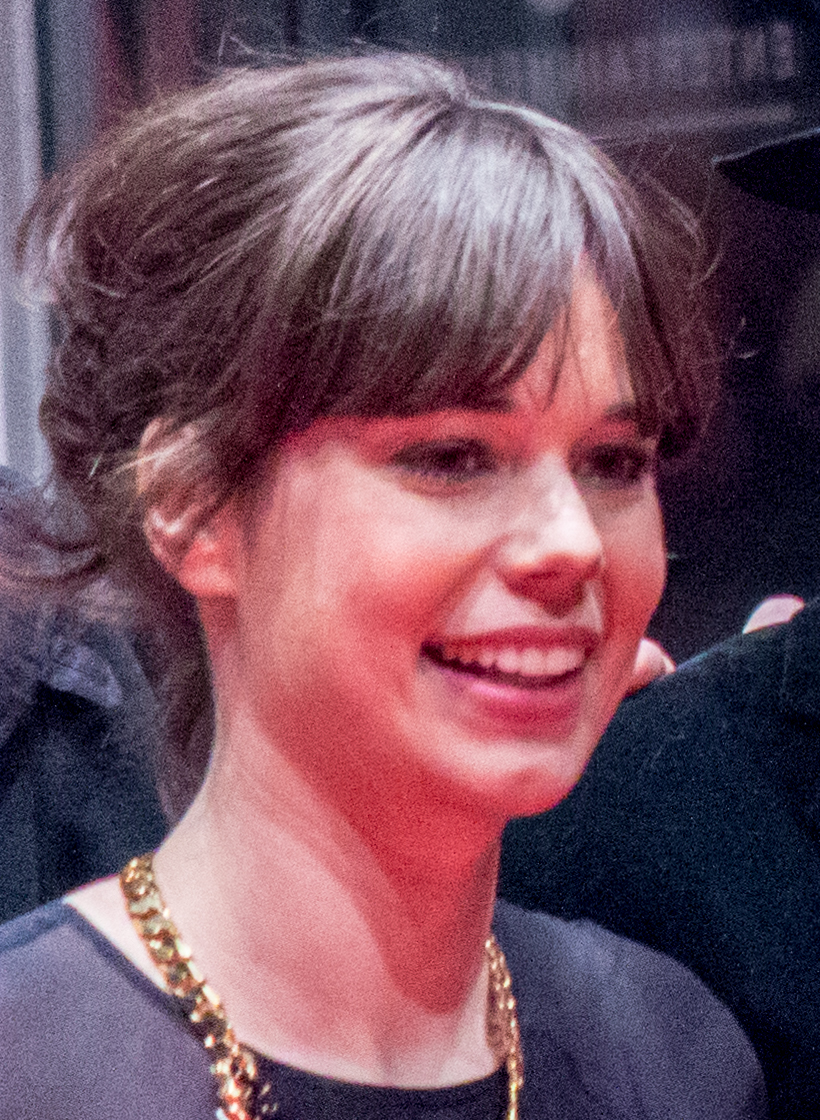
Costa at the 2015 Berlin International Film Festival

In 2014, she played as Luna in the short film Razones. She also starred in Yuriy Moroz's adventure and fantasy film Fort Ross. This was Costa's first international credit in a production. The same year, Costa played Calda in the special reading of Magdalena Barile's Llum o de les potencialitats lluminoses del cos humà at the Festival Grec de Barcelona, and starred in the anthology television series Cuéntame un cuento in a twisted remake of the traditional fairy tale Little Red Riding Hood.

Costa starred as the titular character in Victoria, a crime thriller film directed by Sebastian Schipper, which was almost entirely improvised by the actors; the 134-minute film was shot in a single take. It premiered at the 2015 Berlin International Film Festival to critical acclaim. The role represented her breakthrough, with The New York Times including her in 2015’s "Breakthrough Performances of the Fall Season". The Observer stated "Costa gives a terrific, affecting and, by the end, intensely unsettling performance." In relation to the acting rules during the shooting, Costa was given instructions by Schipper stating, "You cannot repeat the same action, ever. You have to go through the scene, but always in different ways. Even if it is no good. Never, never repeat a sentence, an action. Keep it real." This rule led her to discover the character in a deeper way, blending different versions by the end of the process. She won the German Film Award for Best Actress, the Gaudí Award for Best Female Lead, the Sant Jordi Award for Best Actress in a Foreign Film, and was nominated for a European Film Award for Best European Actress. Her next projects that year were Cites, the Catalan remake of the British TV series Dates, the historical fiction television series Carlos, rey emperador where she portrayed Mary of Austria, and the period melodrama Habitaciones cerradas, based on Care Santos's novel of the same name. Costa held the lead role in the short film No me quites as Laura, who eagerly waits at her house for her ex-boyfriend Luis to return after a two-month absence. Laura Jou, director of the short film, came across Costa during one of her studio courses and was profoundly struck. When speaking about the actress, she remarked, "She had naturalness but also an overwhelming magnetism." Her portrayal earned her the Best Actress in a Short Film at the 19th Málaga Film Festival. In her final performance of 2015, Costa played a minor role in Fernando González Molina's romantic drama Palm Trees in the Snow.

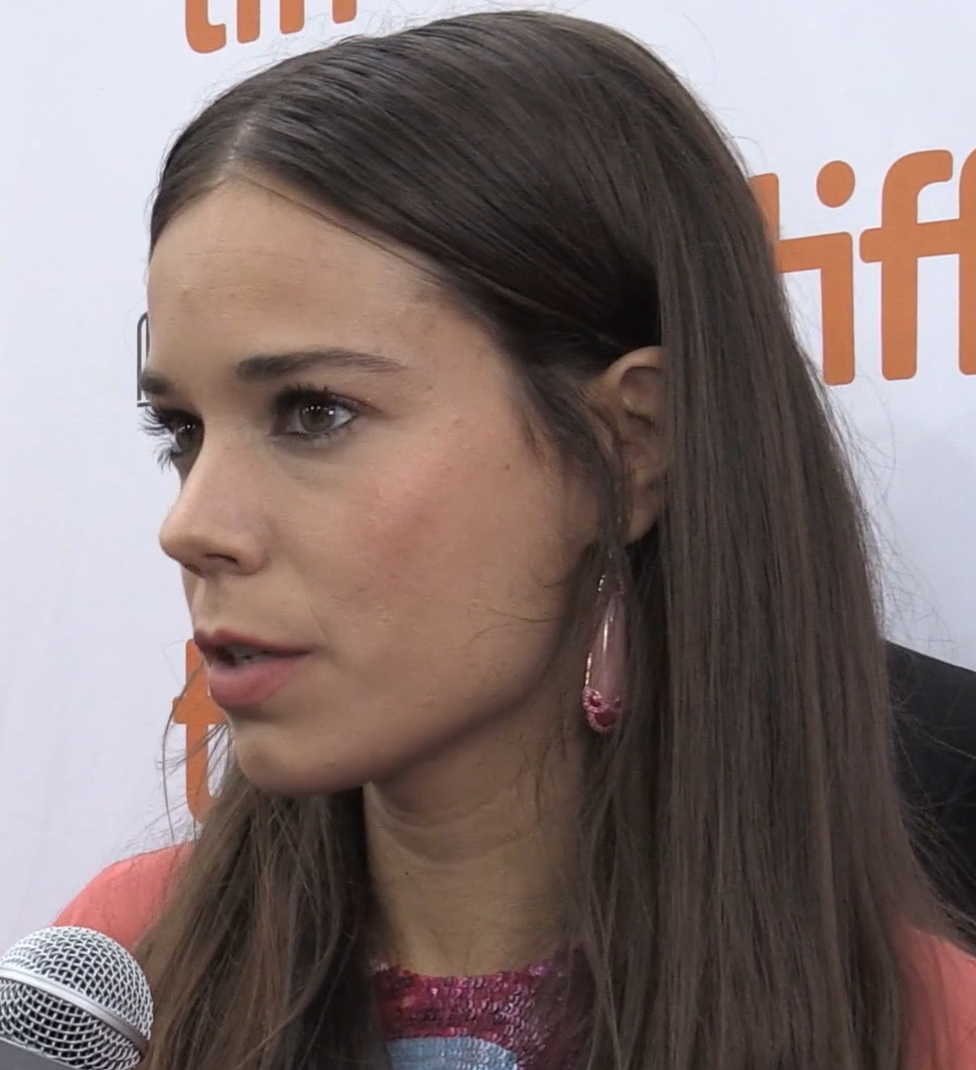
Costa at the Toronto International Film Festival in 2018

In 2016, she starred opposite Jean Reno in Estrella Damm's short film titled The Little Things. During the filming of the project, Reno highlighted Costa's acting qualities, stating "I really like what you do, I don't know if it's talent or hard work, but I don't mind." Her next film the following year was Martín Hodara's Argentine–Spanish thriller Black Snow. It co-starred Ricardo Darín and Leonardo Sbaraglia. The film premiered theatrically in Argentina on 19 January 2017. Her second release in 2017 was Drake Doremus's romantic drama Newness, in which she starred alongside Nicholas Hoult. It premiered at the Sundance Film Festival. In February 2017, Costa was nominated for the BAFTA Rising Star Award.

Costa starred in five feature films in 2018. She co-starred alongside Christopher Abbott and Mia Wasikowska in Nicolas Pesce's psychological horror-thriller Piercing, based on the novel of the same name by Ryū Murakami; it premiered at the 2018 Sundance Film Festival. In the 2018 Tribeca Film Festival, she starred in two films that premiered there: Miguel Arteta's romantic comedy Duck Butter alongside Alia Shawkat, and Matthew Brown's drama Maine, opposite Thomas Mann. Additionally, Costa held the role of executive producer for the latter film. Later that year, she was part of an ensemble cast in Dan Fogelman's drama film Life Itself with Sergio Peris-Mencheta and Antonio Banderas. It premiered at the 2018 Toronto International Film Festival. Costa starred opposite Josh O'Connor in Harry Wootliff's critically acclaimed directorial debut Only You. She portrayed Elena, a Spanish arts council worker who falls in love with a student who is almost a decade younger, only for the relationship to founder as the couple faces infertility issues. It premiered in competition at the BFI London Film Festival, on 19 October 2018; Mark Kermode called her performance "flawless".

In April 2019, it was announced that Costa had been cast alongside Guillermo Pfening in Isabel Coixet's Foodie Love series for HBO Europe. She then filmed the international co-produced Italian English language television series released in 2020 Devils co-starring along Patrick Dempsey based on the international bestseller novel of the same name by Guido Maria Brera. That same year, Costa starred alongside an ensemble cast in the American science fiction television anthology series Soulmates, in the third episode of the first season titled "Little Adventures", directed by Marco Kreuzpaintner and written by Jessica Knappett and Brett Goldstein & William Bridges.

=== Acclaimed at home and prominent star (2022–present) ===
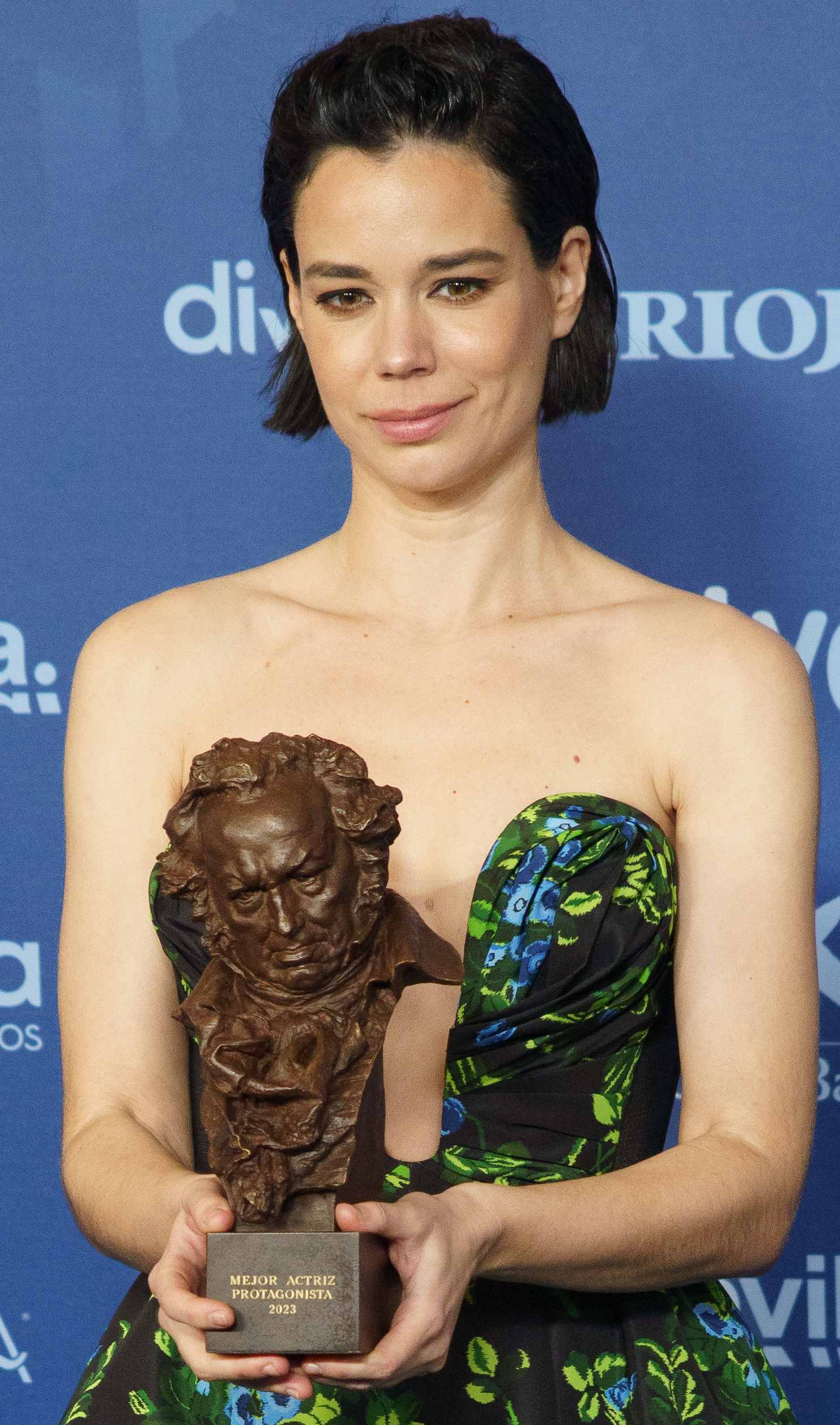
Costa holding her Goya Award for Best Actress in 2023

Costa returned to the Berlinale to premiere Lullaby by Alauda Ruiz de Azúa, which premiered in the Panorama section on 11 February 2022. Subsequently, the film screened at the 25th Málaga Film Festival on 20 March 2022, where it was the grand winner of the edition with the Golden Biznaga for Best Spanish Film, the Silver Biznaga for Best Screenplay, and the Silver Biznaga for Best Female Performance for Costa and Susi Sánchez. She received the script for Lullaby during her third month of pregnancy in 2019, and the exploration of motherhood and caregiving in the film resonated with her personal experiences. As Costa expressed herself to Vanity Fair Spain:

I felt challenged by the script from the beginning. Not only professionally, but also personally: at that moment, I was going to be a mother for the first time, and I had the intuition that that character was for me.

Filming while going through her own early motherhood journey provided an authentic connection with her character, Costa learned to convey emotions subtly in the film, appreciating the depth of caregiving as an act of love. Despite the physical challenges, the close-knit cast and Ruiz de Azúa's direction made the experience enriching. The key lesson Costa took away was to trust her intuition and embrace projects aligned with her stage of life, finding personal satisfaction beyond external outcomes. For her performance as Amaia, a new mother, Costa won accolades including the Goya Award for Best Actress, the Feroz Award for Best Main Actress in a Film, the Forqué Award for Best Film Actress, the Platino Award for Best Actress, and received a CEC Awards nomination for Best Actress.

Costa was also part of an ensemble cast in Alibi's British political thriller series The Diplomat, which premiered on 28 February 2023. She then starred in the Spanish film The Enchanted by Elena Trapé, which premiered as part of the official section of the 26th Málaga Film Festival on March 12, 2023. Costa also starred in the revival of the Catalan romantic drama TV series titled Cites Barcelona, reprising the role of Paula after 7 years. The series premiered on June 13th on the streaming service Amazon Prime Video. She took on the lead role in the film adaptation of Sara Mesa's novel, Un amor, directed by Isabel Coixet, playing Nat, a young woman who escapes to the town of La Escapa to rebuild her life, contending with the distrust of neighbors, the hostility of the landlord, and a disturbing sexual proposal from her neighbor Andreas. The film debuted at the 71st San Sebastián International Film Festival on 26 September 2023. For her performance, she once again secured nominations for a Goya Award for Best Actress, a Feroz Award for Best Main Actress in a Film, a Forqué Award for Best Film Actress, and won her second Platino Award for Best Actress.

Costa also played the character of Moghedien, one of the Forsaken, in Amazon Video's adaptation of Robert Jordan's fantasy epic, The Wheel of Time. Her initial appearance was in the second season's finale, which aired on October 6, 2023. In preparation for the role, Costa worked closely with a movement coach and studied how spiders move, feed, and attack in order to shape the character's physicality and presence. She also incorporated a childlike dimension, drawing inspiration from her young daughter's energy and uninhibited mannerisms. The role marked her first portrayal of an antagonist. Additionally, she co-starred in the Spanish historical drama The Teacher Who Promised the Sea by Patricia Font, which had its global premiere on October 27, 2023, at the 68th Valladolid International Film Festival. In February 2024, Costa was named one of the 50 most influential women in Spanish cinema and audiovisual industry by Forbes Women.

On March 25, 2025, it was reported that Costa will next star with Jack Reynor in Lee Cronin's The Mummy reboot. She was cast after Cronin saw the trailer for Lullaby, later describing her as "very instinctive" and well suited to the role of a mother in the film's family-centered reinterpretation of the classic monster narrative. Costa has stated that the project marked her first major experience in the horror genre, which she had largely avoided since adolescence due to a personal aversion to it, and characterized the shoot as physically and emotionally demanding within a high-intensity production environment.

She is set to lead the cast of Collision Course, an upcoming Netflix heist thriller directed by Daniel Sánchez Arévalo.

== Personal life ==
For six years, Costa relocated from Barcelona to Brickell, the financial district of Miami, Florida, with her husband David López because of his job at a multinational retail company. She met him during her university years.

In May 2020, Costa gave birth to her first child, a girl, at home. In early 2024, she gave birth to a boy.

Costa is also a certified birth doula.

== Filmography ==
Key
†	Denotes productions that have not yet been released

=== Film ===
Year	Title	Role	Notes
2012	I Want You	Chica Serpiente	
2013	Y otro año, perdices	Claudia	Short
2014	Fort Ross	Lyusiya	
2014	Razones	Luna	Short
2015	Victoria	Victoria	
2015	No me quites	Laura	Short
2015	Palm Trees in the Snow	Daniela	
2016	The Little Things	Laia	Short
2017	Black Snow	Laura	
2017	Newness	Gabi Silva	
2018	Piercing	Mona	
2018	Duck Butter	Sergio	Also associate producer
2018	Maine	Bluebird	Also executive producer
2018	Life Itself	Isabel Díaz	
2018	Only You	Elena Aldana	
2022	Lullaby	Amaia	
2023	The Enchanted	Irene	
2023	Un amor	Nat	
2023	The Teacher Who Promised the Sea	Ariadna	
2026	Lee Cronin's The Mummy	Larissa Cannon	
2026	Collision Course	Carla Mencía	

=== Television ===
Year	Title	Role	Notes
2011–12	Bandolera	Inés Flores	Series regular
2012	Toledo	Aurora	Episode: "El pacto"
2013	Polseres vermelles	Rym	Series regular
2013–14	The Time in Between	Alba	3 episodes
2014	Cuéntame un cuento	Claudia	Episode: "Caperucita Roja"
2015	Habitaciones cerradas	Montserrat Espelleta	Mini-series
2015–16	Carlos, rey emperador	Mary of Austria	Series regular
2015–16	Cites	Paula	Recurring role
2019	Foodie Love	Ella	Main protagonist
2020	Devils	Sofia Flores	Series regular
2020	Soulmates	Libby	Episode: "Little Adventures"
2023	The Diplomat (UK)	Mariona Cabell	Mini-series
2023	Cites Barcelona	Paula	Episode: "Paula-Sofía/Matilda-Samuel"
2023–25	The Wheel of Time	Moghedien	Series regular

=== Theatre ===
Year	Title	Role	Notes	Ref.
2013	Atraco, paliza y muerte en Agbanäspach	Maria Kapravof	Teatre Nacional de Catalunya	
2014	Llum o de les potencialitats lluminoses del cos humà	Calda	Festival Grec de Barcelona	

=== Music videos ===
Year	Title	Artist	Role	Ref.
2010	"Today Is the Day"	Portrait	Ella	
2011	"Verdugo"	The New Raemon		
2013	"Arenas Movedizas"	La Bien Querida		

== Awards and nominations ==
Year	Award	Category	Work	Result	Ref.
2014	3rd Subtitle European Film Festival	Spotlight Breakthrough Award		Won	
2015	67th Bambi Awards	Film - National	Victoria	Nominated	
2015	65th German Film Awards	Best Performance by an Actress in a Leading Role	Victoria	Won	
2015	28th European Film Awards	Best Actress	Victoria	Nominated	
2016	8th Gaudí Awards	Best Female Lead	Victoria	Won	
2016	60th Sant Jordi Awards	Best Actress in a Foreign Film	Victoria	Won	
2016	29th Medina Film Festival	Roel for Best Actress	No me quites	Won	
2016	19th Málaga Film Festival	Best Actress in a Short Film	No me quites	Won	
2016	28th L'Alfàs del Pi Film Festival	Best Actress	No me quites	Won	
2016	17th Torrelavega International Short Film Festival	Best Actress	No me quites	Won	
2016	21st Cabra Audiovisual Contest	Best Female Performance	No me quites	Won	
2016	17th Cortogenia Awards	Best Female Performance	No me quites	Won	
2017	70th British Academy Film Awards	BAFTA Rising Star Award		Nominated	
2017	CinEuphoria Awards 2017	Best Actress - International	Victoria	Nominated	
2017	National Film Awards UK 2017	Best Newcomer		Nominated	
2020	7th Feroz Awards	Best Main Actress in a Series	Foodie Love	Nominated	
2022	25th Málaga Film Festival	Silver Biznaga for Best Female Performance	Lullaby	Won	
2022	11th Evolution Mallorca International Film Festival	Evolution New Talent		Received	
2022	24th Albacete Abycine International Film Festival	Young Career Award		Received	
2022	14th CiBRA Film and Word Festival	Best Female Performance	Lullaby	Won	
2022	21st Almería International Film Festival	Best Actress	Lullaby	Won	
2022	28th Forqué Awards	Best Female Performance in a Film	Lullaby	Won	
2023	10th Días de Cine Awards	Best Spanish Actress	Lullaby	3rd Place	
2023	10th Feroz Awards	Best Main Actress in a Film	Lullaby	Won	
2023	78th CEC Awards	Best Actress	Lullaby	Nominated	
2023	37th Goya Awards	Best Actress	Lullaby	Won	
2023	31st Actors and Actresses Union Awards	Best Film Actress in a Leading Role	Lullaby	Won	
2023	10th Platino Awards	Best Actress	Lullaby	Won	
2023	1st Rolling Stone en Español Awards	Performance of the Year	Lullaby	Nominated	
2023	29th Forqué Awards	Best Female Performance in a Film	Un amor	Nominated	
2024	11th Feroz Awards	Best Main Actress in a Film	Un amor	Nominated	
2024	16th Gaudí Awards	Best Actress	Un amor	Nominated	
2024	38th Goya Awards	Best Actress	Un amor	Nominated	
2024	74th Fotogramas de Plata Awards	Best Film Actress (according to readers)	Un amor	Nominated	
2024	32nd Actors and Actresses Union Awards	Best Film Actress in a Leading Role	Un amor	Nominated	
2024	11th Platino Awards	Best Actress	Un amor	Won	
