= Black Snow (2017 film) =

Film by Martín Hodara

- Theatrical release poster
- Spanish: Nieve negra
- Directed by: Martín Hodara
- Written by: Martín Hodara; Leonel D'Agostino
- Produced by: Pablo E. Bossi; Juan Pablo Buscarini; Axel Kuschevatzky; Pol Bossi
- Starring: Ricardo Darín; Leonardo Sbaraglia; Laia Costa; Federico Luppi; Dolores Fonzi
- Cinematography: Arnau Valls Colómer
- Edited by: Alejandro Carrillo Penovi
- Music by: Zacarías de la Riva
- Production companies: Pampa Films; Gloriamundi Producciones; DirecTV; Telefe; Tieless Media; Bowfinger International Pictures; A Contracorriente Films
- Distributed by: Buena Vista International (Argentina); A Contracorriente Films (Spain)
- Release dates: 19 January 2017 (Argentina); 12 April 2017 (Spain)
- Countries: Argentina; Spain
- Language: Spanish
- Box office: $4.8 million

Black Snow (Spanish: Nieve negra) is a 2017 thriller film directed by Martín Hodara (in his solo directorial debut) and starring Ricardo Darín, Leonardo Sbaraglia, and Laia Costa alongside Federico Luppi and Dolores Fonzi.

== Premise ==
The plot concerns about the return of Marcos (together with pregnant wife Laura) to his native Argentina, moving to a remote location in Patagonia to meet with brother Salvador (a presumed fratricide perpetrator) to convince him to sell the lands they both inherited.

== Cast ==
- Leonardo Sbaraglia as Marcos
  - Biel Montoro as young Marcos
- Laia Costa as Laura
- Ricardo Darín as Salvador
  - Mikel Iglesias as young Salvador
- Dolores Fonzi as Sabrina
  - Liah O'Prey as young Sabrina
- Federico Luppi as Sepia
- Iván Luengo as Juan
- Andrés Herrera as father

== Production ==
The film is a Pampa Films, A Contracorriente Films, Gloriamundi Producciones, and Bowfinger International Pictures production. It was shot in between Spain (La Seu d'Urgell), Andorra, and Argentina (Buenos Aires).

== Release ==
Black Snow was released theatrically in Argentina on 19 January 2017 by Buena Vista International. It was presented at the 20th Málaga Film Festival on 18 March 2017. Distributed by A Contracorriente Films, it was released theatrically in Spain on 12 April 2017.

== Reception ==
Alejandro Lingenti of La Nación rated Black Snow as "good", describing it as "a sour and pessimistic film" having its greatest strengths in Darín's and Sbaraglia's performances.

Jonathan Holland of The Hollywood Reporter pointed out that despite the early slow burn, "narrative confusion and implausibility strike over the final run", and it's "that wobbly final stretch that will linger in viewers' minds", underpinning a "less chilling experience than it presumably aims to be".

Raquel Hernández Luján of HobbyConsolas rated the film with 62 points ("acceptable"), citing the "amazing" cinematography and the privilege of having Sbaraglia, Darín, and Luppi together (even if the director does not make the most out of it), but pointing out the film's main flaw to be its writing ("very flat and monotonous in the beginning and rushed in the end").

Javier Ocaña of El País found similarities with Affliction and A Simple Plan, otherwise considering that the film boasts "more visual and acting strength than narrative [strength]", failing to crystallize its ideas into an impactful thriller.

Sergio F. Pinilla of Cinemanía rated Black Snow 3½ out of 5 stars, deeming it to be "an effective, solvent film", once again demonstrating the expertise of Argentine cinema when approaching a certain brand of "intimate, claustrophobic" thriller.

== Accolades ==
Year	Award	Category	Nominee(s)	Result	Ref.
2018	10th Gaudí Awards	Best Actor	Ricardo Darín	Nominated	

== See also ==
- List of Argentine films of the 2010s
- List of Spanish films of 2017
