= Mikel Iglesias =

Spanish actor (born 1996)

- Born: 10 July 1996 (age 28); Barcelona, Catalonia, Spain
- Occupation: Actor
- Years active: 2010—present
- Known for: Ignasi in Polseres vermelles Nico in Yo quisiera

Mikel Iglesias (born 10 July 1996) is a Spanish actor known for his role as Ignasi on the TV3 show Polseres vermelles. Between 2000 and 2006 Iglesias performed as part of a local theater group in Rubí.

He also performs with the group *Arc Iris d'Amor plays in a civic center in Barcelona.

== Filmography ==
=== Films ===
Year	Title	Role
2010	El criminal	Iván
2012	Cenizas y el Edén	
2013	Los últimos días	Dani
2013	Ismael	Chino
2016	The Next Skin	Amic Joan 1
2017	Nieve negra	Young Salvador
2017	Brava	Ruben
2018	Where are the Cools	
2018	A March to Remember	Mikel
2019	Barcelona 1714	Soldat moribund

=== Television ===
Year	Title	Role	Notes
2011–2013	Polseres vermelles	Ignasi	Main role
2015–2018	Yo quisiera	Nico	Main role
2017	Perdóname, señor	El Perla	7 episodes
2018	Snatch	Teenage Punk	2 episodes
2019	Benvinguts a la família	Manu jove	Episode: "Estiu del 92"
