= Maine (film) =

- Film poster
- Directed by: Matthew Brown
- Written by: Matthew Brown
- Produced by: Summer Shelton; Michael B. Clark; Alex Turtletaub
- Starring: Laia Costa; Thomas Mann; Gus Halper
- Cinematography: Donald R. Monroe
- Edited by: Sofi Marshall
- Production companies: Beachside Films; Story Farm
- Distributed by: Orion Classics
- Release date: December 13, 2018
- Running time: 85 minutes
- Country: United States
- Language: English

Maine is a 2018 American drama film written and directed by Matthew Brown and starring Laia Costa and Thomas Mann.

== Cast ==
- Laia Costa
- Thomas Mann
- Gus Halper

== Release ==
The film made its world premiere at the 2018 Tribeca Film Festival. On October 9, 2018, it was announced that Orion Classics acquired North American and Latin American distribution rights to the film.

The film was released in theaters on December 13, 2018 and on VOD and digital platforms on December 14, 2018.

== Reception ==
The film has a 55% rating on Rotten Tomatoes. Marshall Shaffer of Slash Film gave the film an eight out of ten. David Ehrlich of IndieWire graded the film a C+. Sheri Linden of The Hollywood Reporter gave the film a positive review and wrote, "But as an immersion in the physical world and a very particular form of public solitude, Maine delivers."

The film was nominated for the Best Narrative Feature award at the 2018 Tribeca Film Festival.
