= Alive and Kicking (TV series) =

Spanish TV series

- Los espabilados
- Genre: Road movie; Drama
- Created by: Albert Espinosa
- Based on: Lo que te diré cuando te vuelva a ver by Albert Espinosa
- Directed by: Roger Gual
- Starring: Álvaro Requena; Marco Sanz; Sara Manzano; Aitor Valadés; Héctor Pérez; Miki Esparbé
- Opening theme: "Los espabilados" by Alfred García
- Country of origin: Spain
- Original language: Spanish
- No. of seasons: 1
- No. of episodes: 7

Production
- Running time: 25 min (approx.)
- Production company: Movistar+

Original release
- Network: Movistar+
- Release: 29 January – 12 February 2021

Alive and Kicking (Spanish: Los espabilados; lit. 'the clued-up ones') is a Spanish television series created by Albert Espinosa for Movistar+. Based on the novel Lo que te diré cuando te vuelva a ver by Espinosa, the plot follows five teenagers escaping from a mental health centre. It aired in 2021.

== Premise ==
The fiction follows the mishaps of five teenagers (Mickey L'Angelo, Yeray, Guada, Samuel and Lucas) escaping from a mental health centre in Menorca, experiencing from then on a sort of road movie that takes them to different locations in Spain, Germany and Italy in search of Mickey's older brother.

== Cast ==
- Álvaro Requena as Mickey L'Angelo.
- Marco Sanz as Yeray.
- Sara Manzano as Guada.
- Aitor Valadés as Samuel.
- Héctor Pérez as Lucas.
- Miki Esparbé as Izan.
- Marta Torné as Elsa.
- Àlex Brendemühl as Dr. del Álamo.
- Bruno Sevilla as Dr. Sánchez.
- Andreu Benito
- Hanna Schygulla
- Rym Gallardo

== Production and release ==
Created by Albert Espinosa, Los espabilados is inspired by the novel Lo que te diré cuando te vuelva a ver, also authored by Espinosa. It consists of 7 episodes, directed by Roger Gual, featuring a running time of around 25 minutes. A 7-part road movie, the series is a drama with comedy elements. Filming started in Menorca on 4 November 2019. Movistar+ programmed the release of the first 3 episodes for 29 January 2021, and the release of the 4 remaining episodes on a 2 episodes per Friday basis. Before the series' release, Movistar+ tasked Espinosa with the writing of a second and final season, although the platform did not confirm the renovation at the time. The series' main theme, "Los espabilados", was composed and performed by Alfred García.

Series	Episodes	Originally released		
Series	Episodes	First released	Last released	Network
1	7	29 January 2021	12 February 2021	Movistar+

No.	Title	Directed by	Original release date
1	"Ama tu caos"	Roger Gual	29 January 2021
2	"Busca menos y déjate encontrar más"	Roger Gual	29 January 2021
3	"La vida siempre te golpea pero nunca te noquea"	Roger Gual	29 January 2021
4	"La luz atrae a los lobos"	Roger Gual	5 February 2021
5	"Devuelve puñaladas con sonrisas"	Roger Gual	5 February 2021
6	"Herir a los que amaste es incumplir tus propias promesas"	Roger Gual	12 February 2021
7	"No tengas miedo de ser la persona en la que te has convertido"	Roger Gual	12 February 2021

== Reception ==
The portrait of mental disorders in the series was harshly criticised by critics. Reported problematic aspects include the romanticization of illness and the "dangerous" underlying antidiagnostic thesis present in the series.
