= Only You (2018 film) =

2018 film directed by Harry Wootliff

- Theatrical release poster
- Directed by: Harry Wootliff
- Screenplay by: Harry Wootliff
- Story by: Harry Wootliff; Matthieu de Braconier
- Produced by: Tristan Goligher; Matthieu de Braconier; Rachel Dargavel; Claire Mundell
- Starring: Laia Costa; Josh O'Connor
- Cinematography: Shabier Kirchner
- Edited by: Tim Fulford
- Music by: Emilie Levienaise-Farrouch
- Production companies: The Bureau; Synchronicity Films; Crybaby
- Distributed by: Curzon Artificial Eye
- Release dates: 19 October 2018 (London); 12 July 2019
- Running time: 119 minutes
- Countries: United Kingdom; Sweden
- Language: English
- Box office: $240,256

Only You is a romantic drama written and directed by Harry Wootliff, and starring Laia Costa and Josh O'Connor.

The film premiered at The London Film Festival, nominated both for the First Feature Award and IWC Schaffhausen Filmmaker Bursary Award. Only You won The Critics’ Award at the 30th Dinard Film Festival, two British Independent Film Awards, a Writers' Guild Award, and was BAFTA nominated. It received critical acclaim.

== Plot ==
Elena, 35, is a cynic about relationships. Jake, 26, is a romantic. They meet randomly and have what they both presume to be a one-night-stand. Meeting again, and consumed by infatuation, they spend day and night together, missing work, and talking into the early hours.

Jake seamlessly moves in with Elena and she reveals a secret: for fear of rejection she lied about her age. She is not 29, but 32. Jake does not care, saying she is gorgeous. A little later she is 33 'or 34 or 35?' Jake puts the light on and points out she has aged six years in four hours. She says he will be 30 when she is 40, so he might want to break up with her, but he insists he does not care.

Elena insists the age difference is a problem - her parents' divorce has given her a fundamental mistrust of relationships. She pushes Jake away, professing that she is ready to have children and he is too young – their relationship will not last. Jake's mum died when he was seven and he was brought up by his father who was devoted to his wife, and has not had another relationship since her death. Jake has inherited a surety about love and commitment which Elena cannot resist. Jake tells Elena he wants nothing more than to make a family with her and he does not want to waste any time. They start to make love.

Six months later Elena is not pregnant. A trip to her general practitioner to check things are okay leads to tests at the hospital and a tense appointment, during which Elena also reveals she had an abortion as a teenager. They are told that there is nothing wrong with either of them, but because they have been trying for over six months and Elena is over 35, they should put themselves on the list for an IVF date in another six months’.

Elena has a horrible sense of foreboding. They have already embarked on a journey from which there is no turning back. Jake is optimistic, convinced they will manage to conceive before the months are up. Elena is uplifted by Jake's optimism and buys into the idea that they will manage to have a baby naturally.

The months go by, sex becomes strategically timed, leading to nothing but disappointment and IVF starts to feel inevitable. Elena and Jake try to face it with optimism. They put it to the back of their minds that the odds of IVF resulting in a pregnancy are low. They embrace the injections and appointments and interventions. It is an opportunity to have a baby. It will be worth it. But it fails.

They both begin to privately doubt the possibility of ever having a family. They take out their disappointment on each other. Elena has a growing paranoia that Jake will leave her if she does not give him a child. A second round of IVF fails. An explosive argument leads to Elena telling Jake to leave. He tells her if he goes, he will never come back.

After time apart, Elena attends her best friend's wedding. When she returns home that evening, she gathers Jake's remaining belongings, texting him so she can return them to him. Meeting in a cafe, Elena breaks down, declaring he is still profoundly in love with him. She tells him he was right when he said that they already were a family and what they had together was too special to lose. Jake walks out abruptly leaving Elena in tears.

Jake goes to stay with his dad and talks to him about Elena. He does not know what to do, as he and Elena had a perfect relationship just like his dad and mum did and he does not know how to get it back. His dad explains that perfection is just an illusion. He asks Jake if he still loves Elena and he nods. He then asks him what he would do if they never have children together; Jake covers his face with his hands. In the penultimate scene Jake sits alone, thoughtful.

In the final scene, we see Elena walking through the park on an autumnal afternoon. She eventually comes to Jake, waiting for her. They walk towards and embrace each other tenderly.

== Cast ==
- Laia Costa as Elena Aldana
- Josh O'Connor as Jake
- Peter Wight as Andrew
- Lisa McGrillis as Carly
- Stuart Martin as Shane
- Isabelle Barth as Rose
- Orion Lee as Eddie

== Production ==
=== Development ===
Harry Wootliff was primarily interested in telling a modern love story, that explores how life and people's expectations of love are in conflict. Yasmin Omar interviewed Wootliff alongside writer-director Tamara Jenkins, discussing whether infertility is the last taboo in cinema, Wootliff is quoted as saying “You’re grieving the loss of a future and you’re grieving the loss of nothing. People are still keeping it very secret... I think it’s more acceptable to talk about miscarriage than not being able to bear a child.” Wootliff was interested in subverting stereotypes, “I loved that he’s the one who’s open and she’s less into wearing her heart on her sleeve... I wasn’t pedaling this notion of a deranged woman pushed by her hormones to meet a man and have a baby.”

Wootliff is interested in the subtlety of female experience, as opposed to two-dimensional representations, “I sometimes think it’s all about showing women to be very strong. I like my character because she’s a lot of things: she’s vulnerable, irrational, funny. That’s a woman. We have qualities that are deemed as less admirable – perhaps because we are in a male-dominated society – so why shouldn’t we see them?”

=== Filming ===
The film was shot in Finnieston in Glasgow, Scotland, over 25 days.

=== Music ===
The film's original score was composed by Emilie Levienaise-Farrouch of FatCat Records. Other music used in the film included songs by, among others, Elvis Costello, Bronski Beat and Lhasa de Sela. Several critics cited the use of Costello's "I Want You" twice in the film. Mark Kermode made note of the soundtrack more broadly: "Musically, the piano and cello themes of Emilie Levienaise-Farrouch's sparse score are counterposed against an eclectic jukebox selection of tracks, most notably the anguished vocals of Elvis Costello's 'I Want You' – one of the most emotionally astute deployments of a pop song in a movie since Barry Jenkins's killer use of Barbara Lewis's 'Hello Stranger' in Moonlight."

== Reception ==
On the review aggregator website Rotten Tomatoes, 100% of 25 critics' reviews are positive. The website's consensus reads: "Beautifully filmed and powerfully acted, Only You traces the arc of a relationship with refreshing honesty -- and marks Harry Wootliff as a writer-director to watch." Metacritic, which uses a weighted average, assigned the film a score of 78 out of 100, based on 7 critics, indicating "generally favorable" reviews.

Ian Freer of Empire magazine noted the film's heartfelt, indie-romance aspirations, describing Only You as "that rare effort that could go toe-to-toe with its American counterpart, a passionate, moving love story told with nuance and heart". Similarly Peter Bradshaw described it as "a poignant and compelling Venn diagram of passion and heartache". Phil de Semlyen in Time Out called Only You a "compassionate, complex relationship drama will get you right in the feels", while in Sight & Sound Pamela Hutchinson reflected Wootliff's storytelling ability, "a beautifully written screenplay, with a subtly symmetrical structure signposted by two spins of the mournful, urgent I Want You by Elvis Costello, but primarily driven by two recognisably familiar, fully realised characters".

In The Observer, Mark Kermode felt Only You was "a perfectly realised story of love and longing" and 'a terrifically engrossing drama about two wholly believable characters, made with the kind of wit, honesty and raw emotional intimacy that pierces right to the heart of their relationship'. In the Evening Standard, Charlotte O'Sullivan was quick to point out the original take on the subject matter, "O’Connor has argued that Only You is 'as important as I, Daniel Blake'. He's right. Via Elena and Jake, Wootliff champions the marginal and so-called imperfect."
