= Harry Wootliff =

British screenwriter and film director

Harry Wootliff is an English film director and screenwriter.

== Career ==
Wootliff's feature film True Things starring Ruth Wilson and Tom Burke, had its World Premiere at Venice Film Festival, and also screened at Toronto and The London Film Festival, where it won the IWC Shaffhausen award. Samuel Goldwyn Films acquired North American distribution rights to the film.

Wootliff's debut feature film, the critically acclaimed romantic drama Only You starring Laia Costa and Josh O'Connor, premiered 19 October 2018 at The London Film Festival, where it was nominated for both the First Feature Award and IWC Schaffhausen Filmmaker Bursary Award. Only You went on to win The Critics’ Award at the 30th Dinard Film Festival, two British Independent Film Awards, a Writers' Guild Award, and a BAFTA nomination.

Wootliff's debut short film Nits premiered in Cannes Directors' Fortnight, was BAFTA nominated, and won The BFI London Film Festival TCM Classic Shorts Film Competition, Soho Rushes, and Birds Eye View. Her second short film Trip premiered in Official Selection at Berlin.

Wootliff directed the finale of BBC/HBO's His Dark Materials season three. She directed The Woman in the Wall, for BBC/Showtime.

== Sight & Sound poll ==
In the 2022 poll of the greatest films of all time, conducted every ten years since 1952, Harry Wootliff was chosen to contribute and selected the following: Paris, Texas (1984, Wim Wenders) À NOS AMOURS (1983, Maurice Pialat) The Conversation (1974, Francis Ford Coppola) White Material (2009, Claire Denis) A Woman under the Influence (1974, John Cassavetes) Three Colours Blue (1993, Krzysztof Kieslowski) Mouchette (1966, Robert Bresson) Rosetta (1999, Luc Dardenne, Jean-Pierre Dardenne) IVANOVO DETSTVO (1962, Andrei Tarkovsky) Breaking the Waves (1996, Lars von Trier).
