= Breathless Time =

- Spanish: Tiempo sin aire
- Directed by: Andrés Luque Pérez; Samuel Martín Mateos
- Screenplay by: Javier Echániz; Juan Gil Bengoa; Samuel Martín Mateos; Andrés Luque Pérez
- Produced by: Gerardo Herrero; José Velasco
- Starring: Juana Acosta; Carmelo Gómez; Adriana Ugarte; Félix Gómez; Toni Acosta
- Cinematography: Juan Carlos Gómez
- Edited by: Irene Blecua; Manuel Bauer
- Music by: Xavi Font
- Production companies: Hernández y Fernández PC; Tornasol Films; Zebra Producciones; La Ignorancia de la Sangre AIE
- Distributed by: Syldavia Cinema
- Release dates: 20 April 2015 (Málaga); 30 April 2015 (Spain)
- Country: Spain
- Language: Spanish

Breathless Time (Spanish: Tiempo sin aire) is a 2015 Spanish revenge drama film directed by Andrés Luque Pérez and Samuel Martín Mateos which stars Juana Acosta alongside Carmelo Gómez, Adriana Ugarte, and Félix Gómez.

== Plot ==
Upon the killing of her daughter by the paramilitary, Colombian nurse María travels abroad with her remaining child looking for revenge on one of the killers, Iván, who lives with his partner Vero in the Canary Islands.

== Cast ==
- Juana Acosta as María
- Carmelo Gómez as Gonzalo
- Adriana Ugarte as Vero
- Félix Gómez as Iván
- Toni Acosta
- Juan Pablo Shuk
- Blanca Rodríguez
- Iván Luengo

== Production ==
The film was produced by Hernández y Fernández PC, Tornasol Films, Zebra Producciones, and La Ignorancia de la Sangre, and it had the backing of ICAA and TVE. It was shot in the Canary Islands.

== Release ==
The film was presented at the 18th Málaga Film Festival on 20 April 2015. Distributed by Syldavia Cinema, it was released theatrically in Spain on 30 April 2015.

== Reception ==
Jonathan Holland of The Hollywood Reporter stressed as a bottom line that "Juana Acosta is the heart and soul of this rangy but only occasionally powerful revenge yarn".

Sergio F. Pinilla of Cinemanía rated the film 3 out of 5 stars, writing that the film is split "in two unequal blocks, [respectively] starring the solvent Juana Acosta and a blurred Carmelo Gómez".

Mirito Torreiro of Fotogramas highlighted Juana Acosta as the best thing about the film.

== Accolades ==
Year	Award	Category	Nominee(s)	Result	Ref.
2016	30th Goya Awards	Best Special Effects	Reyes Abades, Curro Muñoz	Nominated	

== See also ==
- List of Spanish films of 2015
