= Foodie Love =

- Genre: Romance
- Created by: Isabel Coixet
- Written by: Isabel Coixet
- Directed by: Isabel Coixet
- Starring: Laia Costa; Guillermo Pfening
- Country of origin: Spain
- Original language: Spanish
- No. of seasons: 1
- No. of episodes: 8

Production
- Running time: 35 min (approx.)
- Production company: Miss Wasabi Films

Original release
- Network: HBO España
- Release: 4 December 2019

Foodie Love is a Spanish romance television series also heavily delving into gastronomy. Directed and created by Isabel Coixet, it stars Laia Costa and Guillermo Pfening. It was originally released on HBO España on 4 December 2019.

== Premise ==
The plot follows a couple who, after meeting through a dating app for food lovers, embark into a gastronomic and romantic story.

== Cast ==
Starring

- Laia Costa as "Ella".
- Guillermo Pfening as "Él".

Other and cameos

- Yolanda Ramos
- Tony Thornburg
- Agnès Jaoui
- Natalia de Molina
- Greta Fernández
- Eloi Costa.
- Luciana Littizzetto
- Nausicaa Bonnín
- Marina Campos
- Ferran Adrià
- Bob Pop

== Production and release ==
Notably featuring the style of Isabel Coixet's previous film works, Coixet wrote and directed the series. Produced by Miss Wasabi Films for HBO, the series was the HBO's first venturing into the production of local fiction in Spain. Shooting locations included Barcelona, Rome and Southern France (Montolieu). It consists of 8 episodes featuring a running time of around 35 minutes. The first three episodes were pre-screened at Cine Callao in Madrid on 20 November 2019. The full series was released on 4 December 2019 on HBO España. Coixet was reportedly interested in returning for a second season.

Series	Episodes	Originally released	Network	Ref.
1	8	4 December 2019	HBO España	

No.	Title	Original release date
1	"Solo un café"	4 December 2019
2	"Breakfast in Kentucky"	4 December 2019
3	"La gyoza de Proust"	4 December 2019
4	"Gelato di neve"	4 December 2019
5	"La última cena"	4 December 2019
6	"El croissant perfecto no existe"	4 December 2019
7	"Esto es Francia"	4 December 2019
8	"Una ofrenda de tabaco, cerveza y chocolate"	4 December 2019

== Awards and nominations ==
Year	Award	Category	Nominee(s)	Result	Ref.
2020	7th Feroz Awards	Best Drama Series		Nominated	
2020	7th Feroz Awards	Best Leading Actress	Laia Costa	Nominated	
