= Iván Luengo =

Spanish actor (born 2003)

- Born: Iván Luengo Robles; 3 June 2003 (age 23); Granollers, Barcelona, Spain
- Occupation: Actor
- Years active: 2008–present
- Website: www.ivanluengo.com

Iván Luengo Robles (born 3 June 2003 in Granollers, Barcelona, Spain) is a Spanish actor. He is known for playing Hugo as a child at the end of the film Three Steps Above Heaven, Lleó as a child in an episode of the popular series Polseres vermelles, Peter in the film Chimes and recently recognized for his work under the name of Daniel in the film Breathless Time.

He has also appeared in the series Aída of the broadcaster Tele 5 as Reinaldo in 2014; The Incident, of broadcaster Antena 3 like Hugo who is in post-production, two short one called Papa as Tomas found in Post-production and the second call Filler Paper as Paul, also I signed a second series called Apaches Miguel when he was 10 years and the series is in post-production, the 2015.

In October 2015, Iván Luengo finished shooting the movie called The Proclamation as Marc, the movie was filmed in Barcelona, Sant Pere de Ribes, Sitges and Santa Pau; and it was directed by Dani de la Orden.

In October 2015, TV3 channel announced a new series called Night and Day where participating actors and actresses as Mireia Vilapuig, the creators of the series announced that the young actor Iván Luengo be part of the deal but as an actor delivery.

== Personal life ==
He was born on 3 July 2003 in Granollers, a small Catalan town of Vallès Oriental (Barcelona, Spain). At 9 months of age, he went to live with his family in Sant Antoni de Vilamajor. He has said he wanted to be an actor because it was his passion since he was 5, and that without the support of his family would not be the actor he is today. He loves the Land and his favorite football team is the Barcelona, also loves riding on roller skates and skateboards, and sign language. His skills are football, where he plays for the team of your current city the CF. Vilamajor, the Ski and theater classes in his hometown Granollers, he can also speak in different languages and accents like Castilian and Catalan Native, including the English through level.

== Biography ==
Iván Luengo entered the world of acting in 2008, in an advertisement for Danonino this being his acting debut. In 2009, he made a second ad, this time for Planeta Agostini. In the year 2010, he made a third ad for Lanjarón water; his official debut in film acting was in the same year during the movie Three Steps Above Heaven, in which he played Hugo as a child at the end the film during a scene on the beach.

In 2011, he appeared as a zombie child in the film REC 3: Génesis next to also the actors Alex Monner, Marc Balaguer and Mireia Vilapuig. In 2012, he appeared in the famous series Polseres vermelles portraying Lleó as a child and recently entered the hospital during Memories episode of the second season. In the year 2013, he appeared in the series Crackòvia as grandson Josep Pedregol for 1 chapter; also made appearances in two short films called You chimes under the name of Pedro and another called The Snail Room under the name Marc; both short as main character. In the year 2014, he appeared in the movie called Breathless Time under the name of Daniel, in the same year he appeared in the final season of the series Aída under the name of Reinaldo, in the same year he appeared in a short film called third Quaresma under the name of Hugo as the main character, had announced that it would participate in a new series for the 2015.

In 2015, he announced that the new series that participate is called The Incident under the name Hugo and; He announced his official account of Facebook and Twitter to participate in fourth short film called Pope under the name of Tomas as the main character, which was signed on 24 January 2015. In the third week of August 2015, Ivan Luengo signed a fifth short film called Filler Paper and Paul, which was led by Roger Villarroya and co-starred with actor Francesc Pages and actress Cristina Dilla. Currently finished shooting a series called Apache in Madrid under the name Miguel when he was a boy of 10 years and is currently shooting a film called The Proclamation under the name of Marc being directed by Dani de la Orden. In October 2015, the TV3 channel announces that begins shooting a new series called Night and Day where participating actors and actresses as Mireia Vilapuig, the creators of the series announced that the young actor Iván Luengo be part of the deal but as an actor delivery.

== Filmography ==
=== Television ===
Year	Title	Character	Director	Chain	Notes
2015	Night and Day	N/A	-	TV3	Supporting actor (Shooting in progress)
2015	Apaches	Miguel (Child, 10 years)	-	Antena3	Protagonist (Post-production)
2015	The Incident	Hugo	-	Antena 3	Post-production (6 chapters)
2014	Aída	Reinaldo	Roberto Monge	Tele 5	Brief appearance as an extra (1 chapter)
2013	Crackòvia	Grandson Josep Pedregol	-	TV3	Brief appearance as an extra (1 chapter)
2012	Polseres vermelles	Lleó (Child)	Pau Freixas	TV3	Brief appearance as an extra (1 chapter)
2010	Lanjarón	himself	-	-	Advertisement
2009	Planeta Agostini	himself	-	-	Advertisement
2008	Danonino	himself	-	-	Advertisement

=== Movies ===
Year	Title	Character	Director	Notes
2015	The Proclamation	Marc	Dani de la Orden	Protagonist (Post-production, Movie)
2015	Filler Paper	Pablo	Roger Villarroya	Protagonist (Short)
2015	Pope	Tomas	-	Protagonist (Post-production, Short)
2014	Breathless Time	Daniel	Andrés Luque y Samuel Martín Mateos	Protagonist (Movie)
2013	Quaresma	Hugo	-	Protagonist (Short)
2013	Snail Room	Marc	-	Protagonist (Short)
2013	You chimes	Pedro	Simón García-Miñaúr	Protagonist (Short)
2011	REC 3: Génesis	Zombie child	Paco Plaza	Brief appearance as an extra (Movie)
2010	Three Steps Above Heaven	Hugo (Child)	Fernando González Molina	Brief appearance as an extra (Movie)
