= Life Itself (2018 film) =

2018 film by Dan Fogelman

- Theatrical release poster
- Directed by: Dan Fogelman
- Written by: Dan Fogelman
- Produced by: Marty Bowen; Dan Fogelman; Wyck Godfrey; Aaron Ryder
- Starring: Oscar Isaac; Olivia Wilde; Mandy Patinkin; Olivia Cooke; Laia Costa; Annette Bening; Antonio Banderas
- Narrated by: Samuel L. Jackson; Lorenza Izzo
- Cinematography: Brett Pawlak
- Edited by: Julie Monroe
- Music by: Federico Jusid
- Production companies: FilmNation Entertainment; Nostromo Pictures; Temple Hill Entertainment
- Distributed by: Amazon Studios
- Release dates: September 8, 2018 (TIFF); September 21, 2018 (United States)
- Running time: 117 minutes
- Country: United States
- Languages: English; Spanish
- Budget: $10 million
- Box office: $8 million

Life Itself is a 2018 American psychological drama film written, co-produced and directed by Dan Fogelman. It stars Oscar Isaac, Olivia Wilde, Mandy Patinkin, Olivia Cooke, Laia Costa, Annette Bening, and Antonio Banderas, and follows multiple couples over numerous generations, and their connections to a single event.

The film had its world premiere at the Toronto International Film Festival on September 8, 2018, and was theatrically released in the United States on September 21, 2018, by Amazon Studios. Life Itself was largely panned by critics, who criticized Fogelman's screenplay and direction, and calling it "simultaneously overwrought and underwhelming."

== Plot ==
Chapter One – The Hero

Narrator Samuel L. Jackson calls Henry the hero, as he talks to his therapist, Dr. Cait Morris. Unimpressed, he focuses on Cait. As she crosses the street, Will Dempsey accidentally causes her to be hit by a bus. Breaking the narration, Sam appears, insisting Cait is fine as she is the hero. Finding her dead, he leaves.

This is actually part of Will's script. Another narrator explains Cait is Will's therapist since his psychiatric hospital release. Flashbacks show Will and his wife Abby's married life. She is a Bob Dylan fan, and pregnant.

Abby witnesses her parents die in a car accident from the backseat young. Her subsequent guardian, Uncle Joe, sexually abused her for years, until she threatened to kill him if he touched her again.

Abby and Will meet in college, date and he proposes within a year. She meets his parents Irwin and Linda. Another time, Abby excitedly talks to Will about her thesis on the unreliable narrator: life is the ultimate one as it is so tricky and surprising.

In the present, Cait encourages Will to remember what happened "that day" which prompted his institutionalization. After lunch with his parents, they are walking home. Abby announces they are having a girl, whom she wants to name Dylan. Distracted, she is struck by a bus, as a little boy watches from inside. Abby dies but the baby survives. Will then shoots himself dead in Cait's presence.

Chapter Two – Dylan Dempsey

Will and Abby's daughter Dylan feels a dark cloud following her. Her parents never met her; her grandmother passes away when she is six. Dylan's dog dies the following year. Left with only her grandfather, they converse about death.

On her 21st birthday, Dylan performs a rendition of "Make You Feel My Love" with her band. Afterwards, she fights someone before leaving. Sitting on a bench smoking weed, Dylan imagines her mother's final moment. Waking up crying with the bus in front of her, she seemingly sees the young boy on the bus asking her if she is okay.

Chapter Three – The Gonzalez Family

In Spain, olive plantation owner Vincent Saccione invites worker Javier Gonzalez inside. He explains how he inherited his Italian father's wealth and land although he was illegitimate. Javier is promoted to foreman, which includes rooms in the house.

Javier marries his beloved Isabel Diaz, and they have Rodrigo. Saccione often visits mother and son while Javier is working. When he gives Rodrigo a globe, it causes a rift in the family. Javier returns it, upsetting both mother and son.

Javier's family travels to NYC. Rodrigo is enjoying himself, until he distracts their bus driver, inadvertently causing Abby to be killed, which traumatizes him.

Back home, Javier and Isabel's marriage is strained as Rodrigo is sleepless. Javier reluctantly asks for Saccione's help. Fearing his family loves Saccione more than him, he confronts him, who admits he loves them both. Javier leaves, although Isabel begs him not to. She stays with Saccione, but insists she will not love him like she loves Javier.

Chapter Four – Rodrigo Gonzalez

Rodrigo grows up and goes to college in NYC. He starts a relationship with Shari, a Long Island student. He returns home when Isabel contracts cancer. He wants to stay, but she tells him goodbye.

Shari's April Fool's Day prank, that she is pregnant, starts the most important day of Rodrigo's life. When she admits it is a 'joke', Rodrigo breaks up with her. In Spain, Isabel has little time left, so Javier arrives for the first time in years to spend one final moment with her. Saccione has kept him updated on his family. Hearing his mom had died Rodrigo, distraught, jogs through the city. Finding Dylan crying on the bench, he asks her if she is okay.

Chapter Five – Elena Dempsey-Gonzalez

Dylan and Rodrigo's daughter Elena reads from her book, Life Itself, the story of everything up to her parents' meeting. She repeats what Isabel told Rodrigo: even if life brings us to our knees, if we look hard enough, we will find love.

In conclusion, Elena's story hinges upon one moment which shaped her entire life. She sees both of her grandmothers (Abby and Isabel) in herself. The last scene is of Will admiring a pregnant Abby.

== Cast ==
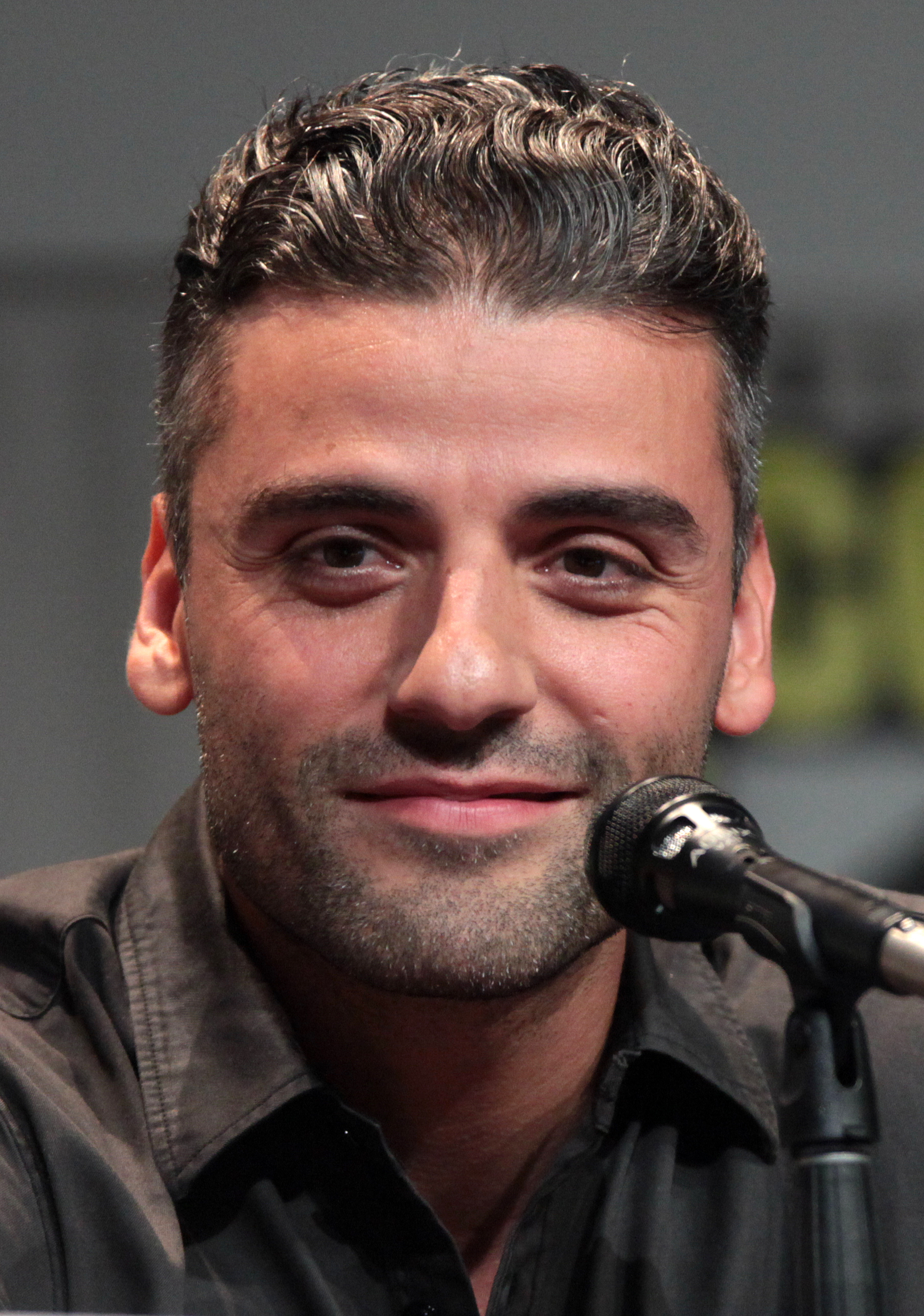
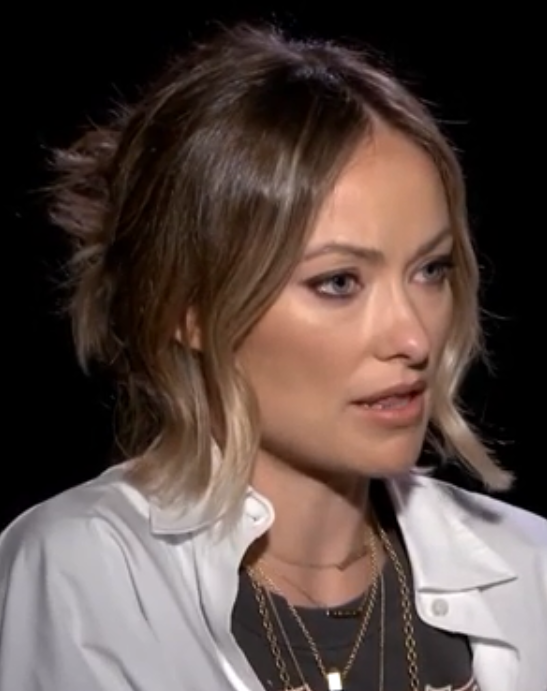
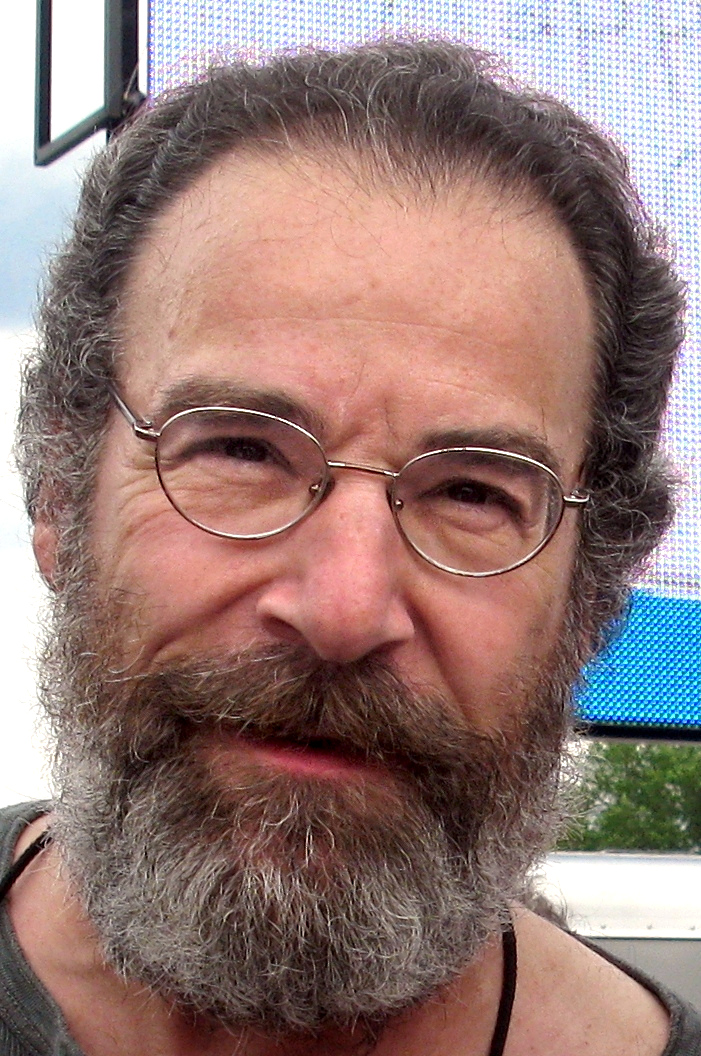
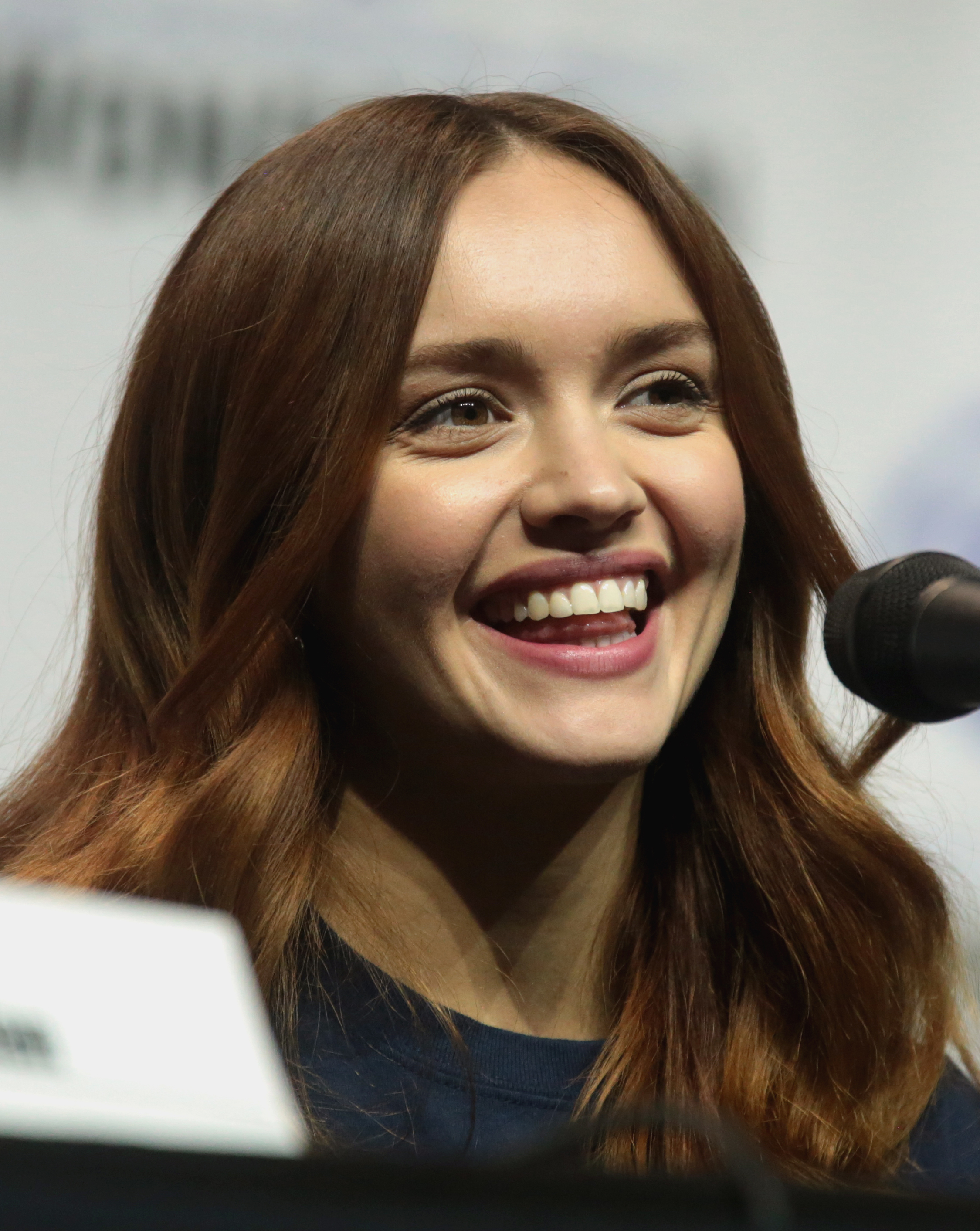
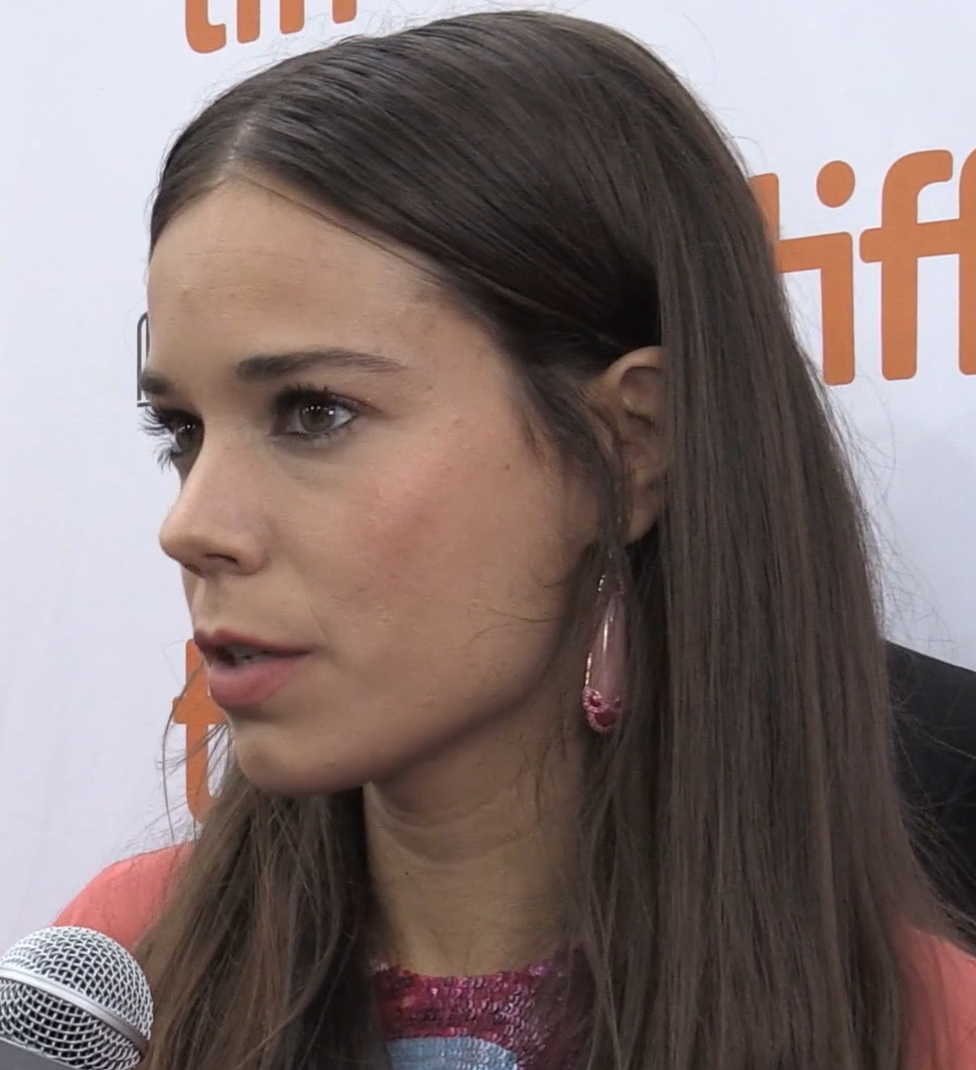
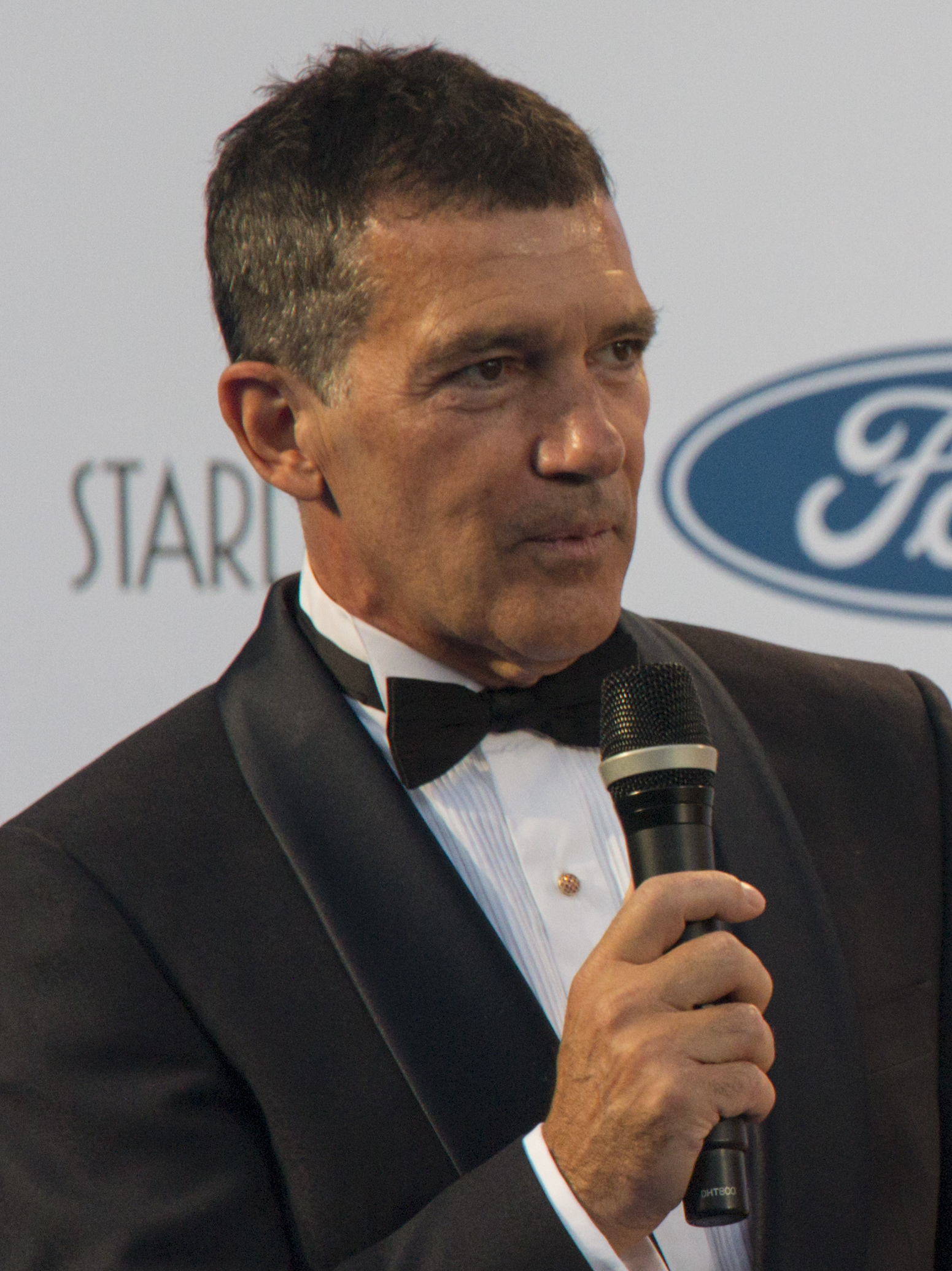
The film stars Oscar Isaac, Olivia Wilde, Mandy Patinkin, Olivia Cooke, Laia Costa and Antonio Banderas.
- Oscar Isaac as William “Will” Dempsey, Abigail’s husband, Dylan’s father and Irwin and Linda’s son
- Olivia Wilde as Abigail “Abby” Lesher, William's wife and Dylan’s mother
  - Caitlin Carmichael as 11–13-year-old Abigail
  - Jordana Rose as 5–7-year-old Abigail
- Mandy Patinkin as Irwin Dempsey, William's father, Dylan’s grandfather and Linda’s husband
- Jean Smart as Linda Dempsey, William's mother, Dylan’s grandmother and Irwin’s wife
- Olivia Cooke as Dylan Dempsey, William and Abigail’s daughter, Irwin and Linda’s granddaughter, Rodrigo’s wife and Elena’s mother
  - Kya Kruse as Young Dylan
  - Alisa Sushkova as Baby Dylan
- Sergio Peris-Mencheta as Javier González, Rodrigo’s father and Isabel’s husband
- Laia Costa as Isabel Díaz, Rodrigo’s mother and Javier’s wife
- Àlex Monner as Rodrigo González, Javier and Isabel's son, Shari’s boyfriend, Dylan’s husband and Elena’s father
  - Yeray Alba Leon as 14-year-old Rodrigo
  - Pablo Lagüens Abad as 13-year-old Rodrigo
  - Javier Verdugo Luque as 10-year-old Rodrigo
  - Adrian Marrero as 7–10-year-old Rodrigo
- Isabel Durant as Shari Dickstein, Rodrigo's immature girlfriend
- Lorenza Izzo as Elena Dempsey-González, Rodrigo and Dylan's daughter
- Annette Bening as Dr. Caitlin Morris
- Antonio Banderas as Vincent Saccione
- Samuel L. Jackson as himself
- Charlie Thurston as Jack
- Jake Robinson as Henry

== Production ==
In August 2016, FilmNation Entertainment acquired the film's script, by Dan Fogelman, who also directed the film; FilmNation had bought the script after it appeared on The Black List. Marty Bowen and Wyck Godfrey served as producers on the film under their Temple Hill Entertainment banner. In November 2016, Oscar Isaac joined the cast. In January 2017, Olivia Cooke, Antonio Banderas, Samuel L. Jackson, Olivia Wilde and Laia Costa were also added, and in March 2017, Annette Bening joined as well, alongside Mandy Patinkin and Alex Monner.

Principal photography began on March 13, 2017 in New York City, and continued in Spain in May.

== Release ==
In December 2017, a fierce bidding war for distribution rights for the film, fought between Amazon Studios, Universal Pictures, and Paramount Pictures, concluded with Amazon Studios winning the rights with a $10-million-dollar-plus bid.

The film premiered on September 8, 2018, at the Toronto International Film Festival, and was theatrically released on September 21, 2018, in the United States. It was released on January 4, 2019, in the United Kingdom.

== Reception ==
=== Box office ===
In the United States and Canada and China, Life Itself was released alongside The House with a Clock in Its Walls, Assassination Nation and Fahrenheit 11/9, and was projected to gross $4–6 million from 2,578 theaters during its opening weekend. It brought in $2.1 million over its first weekend, finishing 11th, behind a number of films that ranged from their second to seventh week in theaters. This was the second worst opening, since 1982, by a film that opened at over 2,500 theaters.

=== Critical response ===
On review aggregator Rotten Tomatoes, the film has an approval rating of 13%, based on 153 reviews, with an average rating of 3.7/10. The website's critical consensus reads, "A mawkish melodrama that means less the more it tries to say, Life Itself suggests writer-director Dan Fogelman's talents are best suited to television." On Metacritic, the film has a weighted average score of 21 out of 100, based on reviews from 39 critics, indicating "generally unfavorable" reviews. Audiences polled by CinemaScore gave the film an average grade of "B+" on an A+ to F scale, while PostTrak reported filmgoers gave it 2.5 out of 5 stars and a 47% "definite recommend".

Kate Erbland of IndieWire gave the film a "D", saying: "Life Itself thinks you're stupid. Or, if not stupid, unable to understand how a movie should work. It's a movie made for people who can't be trusted to understand any storytelling unless it's not just spoon-fed but ladled on, piled high, and explained via montage and voiceover." A. O. Scott, chief film critic for The New York Times, calls it an "inadvertently hilarious" film, filled with "parental slaughter ... (where) mothers and fathers are hit by buses, perish in car accidents, commit suicide and succumb to cancer," though he praises Isaac, Wilde, Costa, and Peris-Mencheta (playing the "starting" couples in the two countries) for their acting.
