= Acceleration test =

An acceleration test is designed to quantify the rigidity of palletized goods subject to horizontal inertial forces. The test is defined according to the Eumos 40509 standard. The test was invented by Marc Juwet of KU Leuven in 2008 and is now in worldwide use. As with other types of cargo, a pallet load must be properly secured during transport. In most cases, it is impractical to secure every product on the pallet. To make sure that the load does not significantly deform, it must be properly packed.

== Eumos 40509 ==
In 2012, the Eumos 40509 standard described a method to certify packaging effectiveness. A test pallet is put on a loading platform that is accelerated at a constant acceleration for 0.3 seconds or longer. This constant acceleration level must be reached within 50ms. During the test, the sides of the pallet load are not supported, thus allowing the products and the packaging to deform. Most often, an acceleration level of 0.5 gravities is used according to legislation in most countries.

Eumos 40509 includes certification criteria. Maximum elastic deformation must not exceed 10%, maximum permanent product deformation must not exceed 5% and packaging must not be damaged during the test. The test certificate includes a detailed description of the load under test as well as a picture of the pallet load before and after the test. Certified pallet loads must carry a label mentioning the date of the test, the name of the test institute, the producer and the maximum inertial force. Pallet loads that resist an acceleration test up to 0.5 g, can be prevented from sliding and tilting in the transverse transport direction. Most often a single lashing, support by a vehicle wall or other pallet loads provides a legally required safety level in most countries.
