= ETSEIB =

University school

Superior Technical School of Industrial Engineering of Barcelona
- ETSEIB
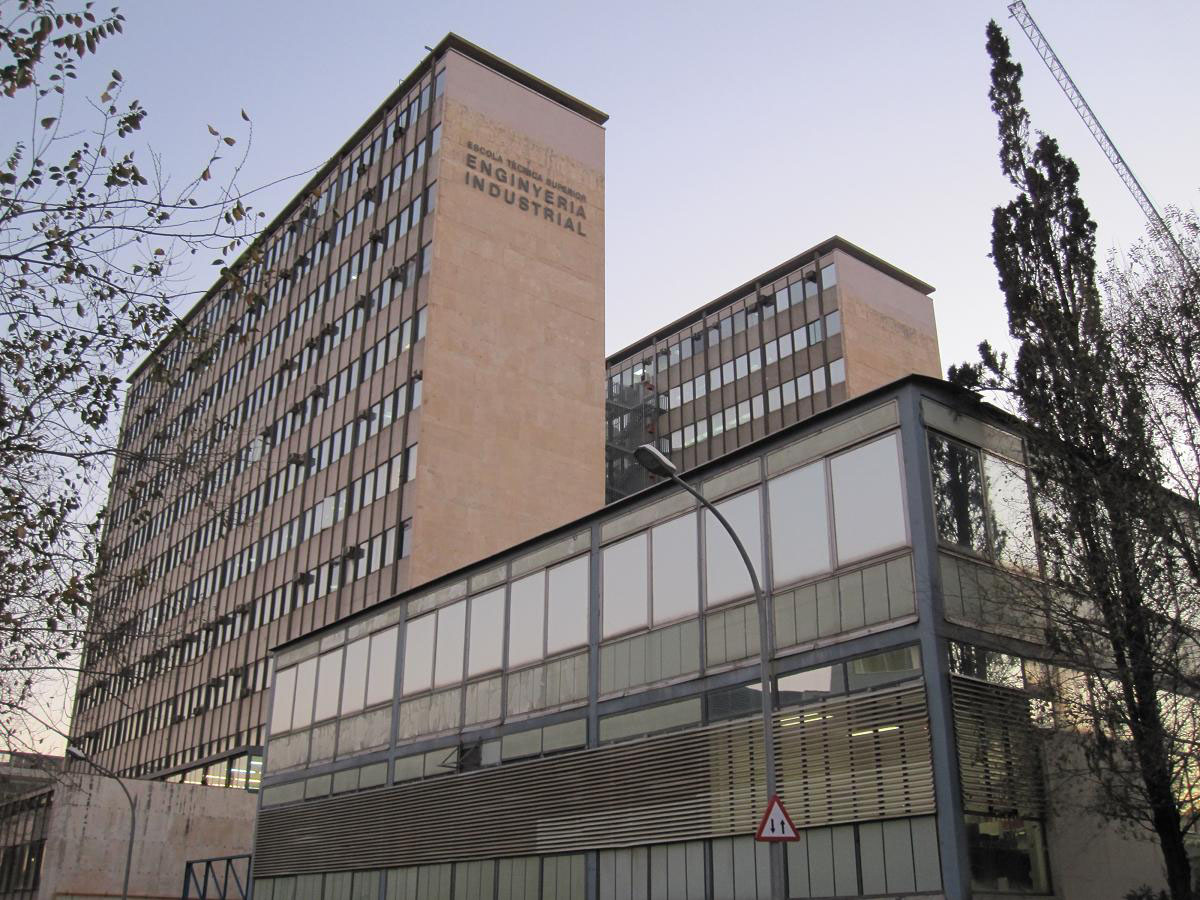
- The "Torres de l’ETSEIB" on Avinguda Diagonal
- Type: Public engineering school
- Established: 1851
- Parent institution: Universitat Politècnica de Catalunya
- Academic affiliations: Top Industrial Managers for Europe
- Director: Neus Cònsul
- Academic staff: 410 (2018)
- Students: 3171 (2017)
- Location: Avinguda Diagonal 647, Barcelona, Spain; 41°23′03″N 2°06′56″E
- Campus: Diagonal Sud (Urban)
- Website: etseib.upc.edu

- Location in Catalonia

The Superior Technical School of Industrial Engineering of Barcelona (Escola Tècnica Superior d'Enginyeria Industrial de Barcelona in Catalan, abbreviated ETSEIB) is a university school that is part of the Universitat Politècnica de Catalunya (Polytechnic University of Catalonia, UPC).

== History ==
Superior Technical School of Industrial Engineering of Barcelona was created in 1851, absorbing the technical and scientific schools that the Junta de Comerç (trade council, a sort of chamber of commerce) had gradually created beginning in 1769. Of all the engineering schools established in Spain at that time, it is the only one that still exists. Classes were initially held in the former convent of Sant Sebastià (which no longer exists), close to the La Llotja building. In 1873, the School moved to a building on Plaça de la Universitat. In 1927 it moved again, to part of the old Can Batlló factory on Carrer Urgell. Finally, in 1964, it moved to the building on Avinguda Diagonal where it is currently located. It's one of the schools who 1971 come together and established the UPC, the Polytechnic University of Catalonia.

== Academics ==
The ETSEIB is the biggest engineering school in Catalonia, with more than 3100 students and about 410 professors. The following courses are currently being taught at the ETSEIB:

=== First and second cycle degrees ===
- Degree in Industrial Engineering
- Degree in Industrial Technologies and Economic Analysis (Major/Minor degree taught fully in English)

=== Second cycle degrees ===
- Degree in Materials Engineering
- Degree in Industrial Organization Engineering

=== Official master's degrees ===
- Erasmus Mundus master's degree in Mechanical Engineering
- Master's Degree in Materials Science Engineering & European
- Master's Degree in Advanced Materials Science and Engineering (Erasmus Mundus)
- Master's Degree in Biomedical Engineering
- Master's Degree in Logistics, Transport and Mobility
- Master's Degree in Biotechnological Engineering
- Master's Degree in Polymers and Biopolymers
- Master's Degree in Nuclear Engineering

=== UPC degrees ===
- Degree in Design
- European master's degree in Materials Engineering

== Student associations ==
- Cine Club Enginyers. Engineering Students’ Cinema Club, which puts on premieres and sneak previews and publishes a quarterly bulletin named 8mm.
- Club Esportiu. Sports Club. It promotes activities related to sports and organizes competitions.
- Delegació d'Estudiants. It is the official organism of students representation.
- Enginyeria Sense Fronteres. Development NGO specialized in matters of cooperation with water services and alternative energy sources.
- Erasmus Student Network. International student organization which tries to promote opportunities for the cultural comprehension and self-development. They work by their motto: Students helping students.
- ETSEIB Motorsport. Students group in charge of the design and construction of a single-seater vehicle to compete in the Formula Student.
- Forum ETSEIB. Students associate themselves in order to annually organize the Forum. The Forum intends to be the connection between ETSEIB's students and companies.
- Utopia theater group. It is the theater group of the school. With over 20 years on active, it is today the oldest of the UPC theater groups.
- IAESTE - International Association for the Exchange of Students for Technical Experience. Organization involved in the interchange between students of technical and scientific careers.
- L'Altre. Students associate themselves to annually organize this alternative Forum. The Forum intents to be the connection between ETSEIB students and those entities which are involved in sustainability (in its most general approach): environment, workers’ rights, etc.

== See also ==
- Universitat Politècnica de Catalunya
