= Polseres vermelles =

Television series

- Also known as: Spanish: Pulseras rojas; The Red Band Society
- Genre: Drama
- Created by: Albert Espinosa
- Written by: Albert Espinosa
- Screenplay by: Albert Espinosa, Pau Freixas
- Starring: Àlex Monner; Igor Szpakowski; Joana Vilapuig; Mikel Iglesias; Marc Balaguer; Nil Cardoner
- Country of origin: Spain
- Original language: Catalan
- No. of seasons: 2
- No. of episodes: 28

Production
- Production location: Catalonia
- Running time: 45 minutes

Original release
- Network: TV3
- Release: January 24, 2011 – April 22, 2013

Polseres vermelles (Eastern Catalan: [pulˈseɾəz βəɾˈmɛʎəs], literally "Red bracelets", known in English as The Red Band Society) is a Catalan television show, created by Albert Espinosa. He and director-producer Pau Freixas had previously worked together on the film Herois.

The show draws on Espinosa's childhood experiences, telling the story of a group of children and teenagers who meet as patients in the children's wing of a hospital.

The first season of the show, originally planned for four seasons, aired on TV3 in 2011, with a second one premiering in January 2013. The Spanish channel Antena 3 aired the first season, dubbed into Spanish as Pulseras rojas, in summer 2012 and the second one in late 2013.

In October 2011, it was announced that Steven Spielberg's DreamWorks and Marta Kauffman had reached an agreement with TV3 for an American remake of Polseres Vermelles. In November 2013, the Fox Network announced it would be adapting the series, with Margaret Nagle from Boardwalk Empire set to write the script. Besides the American version, the series has been adapted in other countries, as well, most notably in Italy and Germany.

== Main characters ==
The Polseres vermelles group has six members. In the first episode, Benito (Andreu Benito), an older patient who acts as a mentor to Lleó, explains that every group of friends includes six types: the Leader, the Second Leader, the Indispensable, the Handsome One, the Clever One, and the Girl. The formation of the group follows this theory.

- Lleó (Àlex Monner) – the Leader [ el Líder ]

He turns 15 during the first season and has been at the hospital for two years. He has cancer and has had his leg amputated. He shares a room with Jordi. He is in love with Cristina.

- Jordi (Igor Szpakowski) – the Second Leader (who would be the Leader if the Leader weren't there) [ el Segon Líder (que sería Líder si no hi hagués Líder) ]

He arrives at the hospital in the first episode. He is 14 years old. He has cancer and has to have a leg amputated. In season one he has feelings for Cristina and they date for a while until she breaks up with him because she's in love with Lleó. In season two it shows that even after their breakup they continue to be good friends.

- Cristina (Joana Vilapuig) – the Girl [ la Noia ]

She is the only girl in the Polseres. She lives on a different floor. She has anorexia. During the first season, she debates whether she is in love with Jordi or Lleó. Towards the end of the first season she chooses Lleó, realizing that he's the one she's truly in love with.

- Ignasi (Mikel Iglesias) – the Handsome One [ el Guapo ]

He is admitted to the hospital after fainting on the playground. At first, he doesn't want to make friends, but as it becomes clear that he will be hospitalized for some time he joins the Polseres.

- Toni (Marc Balaguer) – the Clever One [ el Llest ]

He is the oldest of the Polseres, but he seems like a young child. He has Asperger's syndrome, which makes him seem a bit odd. He arrives at the hospital because of a motorcycle accident.

- Roc (Nil Cardoner) – the Indispensable One [ l'Imprescindible ]

The kid of the group. He is in a coma after jumping off a diving board. His mother visits him frequently and speaks to him. He has a special relationship with Toni because he can communicate with him despite being in a coma. Roc serves as the show's narrator.

== Episodes ==
Season	Episodes	Originally aired	
Season	Episodes	First aired	Last aired
1	13	January 24, 2011	May 2, 2011
2	15	January 14, 2013	April 22, 2013

== International versions ==
Country/language	Local title	Channel	Date aired/premiered
Egypt	مسلسل الشريط الاحمر الشريط الاحمر الشريط الأحمر alsharit al'ahmar (الشريط الأحمر)	Middle East Television	17 May 2018
Peru	Pulseras rojas	América Televisión	27 April 2015
Chile	Pulseras rojas	TVN	31 March 2014
France	Les Bracelets rouges	TF1	5 February 2018
Germany	Club der roten Bänder	VOX	9 November 2015
Italy	Braccialetti rossi	Rai 1	26 January 2014
Russia	Красные браслеты	Channel One	25 November 2017
Slovakia	Červené pásky	Markíza	3 March 2020
Ukraine	Красные браслеты	STB	25 November 2017
United States	Red Band Society	Fox	17 September 2014
Quebec	Les Bracelets Rouges (Québec, Canada)	TVA	4 January 2022
