= 38th Goya Awards =

Spanish film awards

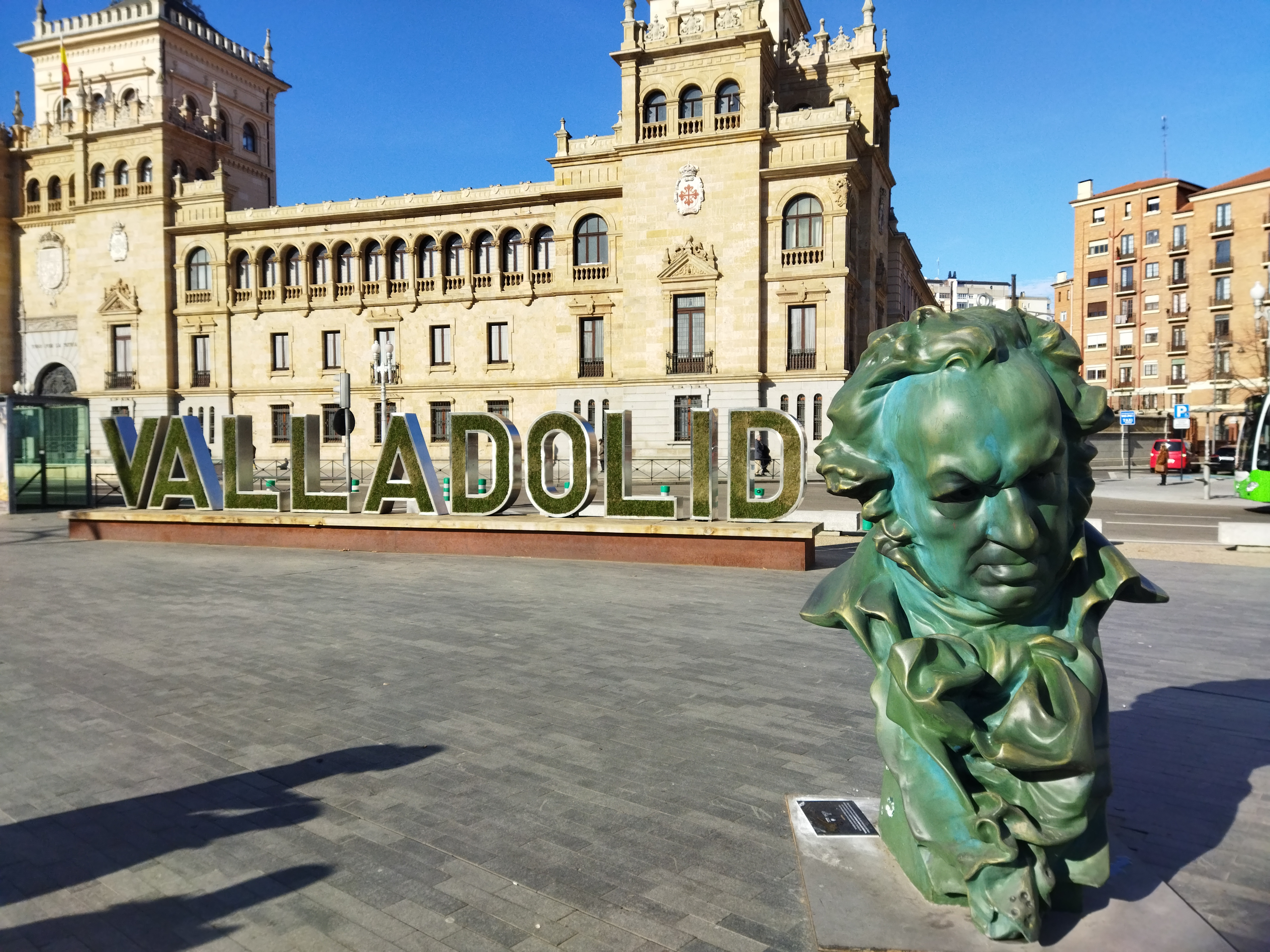
- Date: 10 February 2024
- Site: Feria de Valladolid, Valladolid, Spain
- Hosted by: Ana Belén; Javier Ambrossi; Javier Calvo
- Organized by: Academy of Cinematographic Arts and Sciences of Spain

Highlights
- Best Film: Society of the Snow
- Best Direction: J. A. Bayona; Society of the Snow
- Best Actor: David Verdaguer; Jokes & Cigarettes
- Best Actress: Malena Alterio; Something Is About to Happen
- Most awards: Society of the Snow (12)
- Most nominations: 20,000 Species of Bees (15)

Television coverage
- Network: La 1, RTVE Play
- Viewership: 2.36 million (23.5%)

The 38th Goya Awards ceremony, presented by the Academy of Cinematographic Arts and Sciences of Spain, took place at the Feria de Valladolid premises in Valladolid, Castile and León on 10 February 2024. The ceremony was broadcast on La 1 and RTVE Play.

J. A. Bayona's Society of the Snow received the most awards during the ceremony with twelve wins, including Best Film.

== Background ==
In March 2023, Valladolid was revealed as the host city for the 38th edition, together with the 2025 host city, Granada. On 29 June 2023, the specific date of 10 February was disclosed by the academy president Fernando Méndez-Leite and the Mayor of Valladolid Jesús Julio Carnero. The mixed selection process was modified so 3 nominations be chosen by academy members belonging to the respective specialisation with the other two being elected by the entire body of academy members. The shortlist system for the short film and documentary award categories was also discarded.

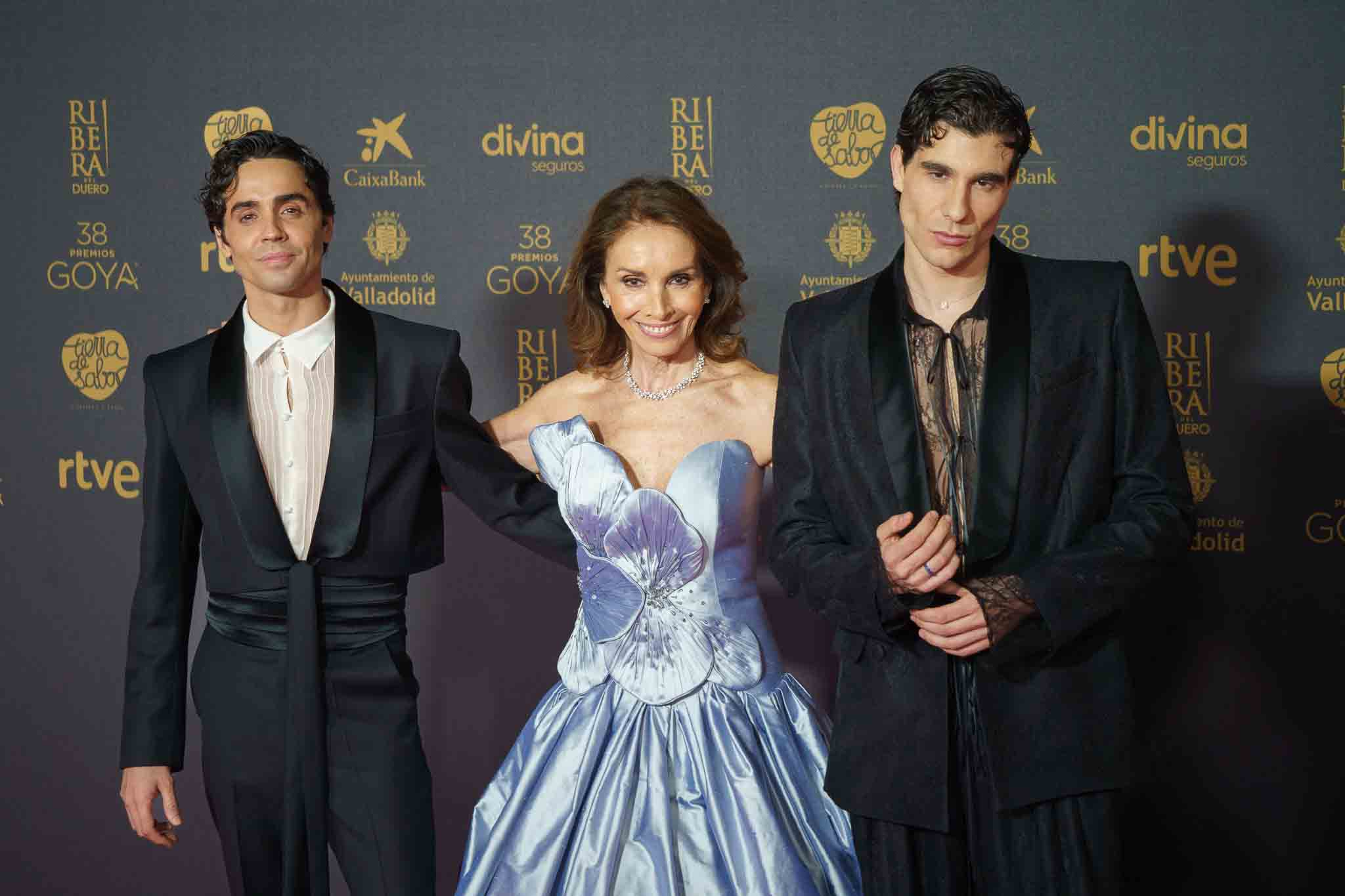
Gala hosts Javier Ambrossi, Ana Belén, and Javier Calvo.

In October 2023, the full slate of submissions by national film academies and committees to the Goya Award for Best European Film was announced: Aftersun (United Kingdom), Anatomy of a Fall (France), Behind the Haystacks (Greece), Thunder (Switzerland), Great Yarmouth: Provisional Figures (Portugal), The Eight Mountains (Italy), Safe Place (Croatia), The Teachers' Lounge (Germany), Sughra's Sons (Azerbaijan), and The Last Ashes (Luxembourg). On 30 October 2023, Méndez-Leite announced Ana Belén, Javier Ambrossi, and Javier Calvo as the gala hosts.

The nominations were read by Luis Tosar and Anna Castillo on 30 November 2023 as a part of the programming of La1 morning television show Mañaneros. 20,000 Species of Bees led the nominations with fifteen, followed by Society of the Snow with thirteen.

Amaia, David Bisbal, Estopa, María José Llergo, India Martínez, Niña Pastori, Sílvia Pérez Cruz, and Salvador Sobral were later announced as musical performers.

The gala broadcast on La 1 commanded a 23.5% audience share (2,359,000 viewers).

== Winners and nominees ==
The winners and nominees are listed as follows:

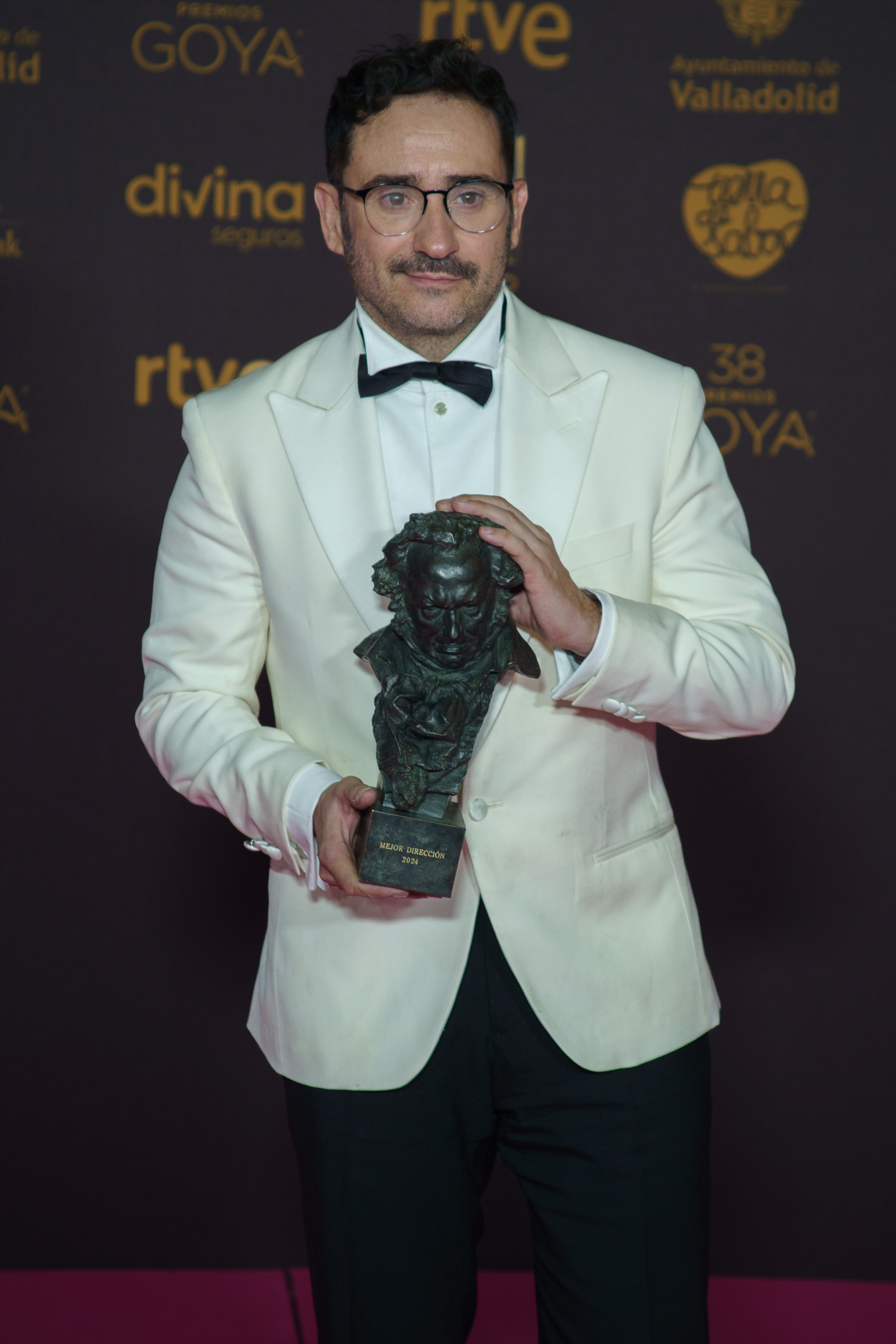
J. A. Bayona, Best Director winner.

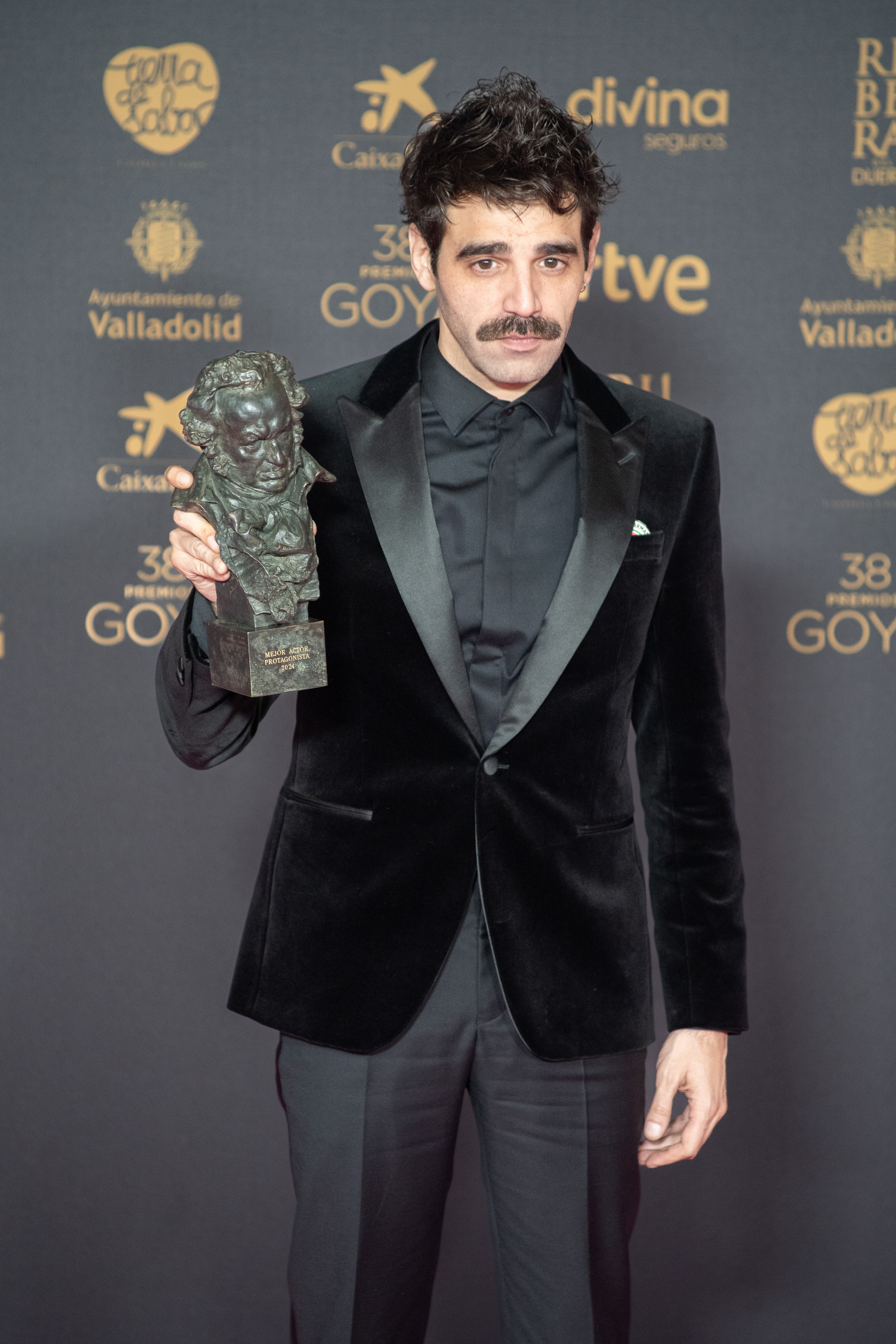
David Verdaguer, Best Actor winner.

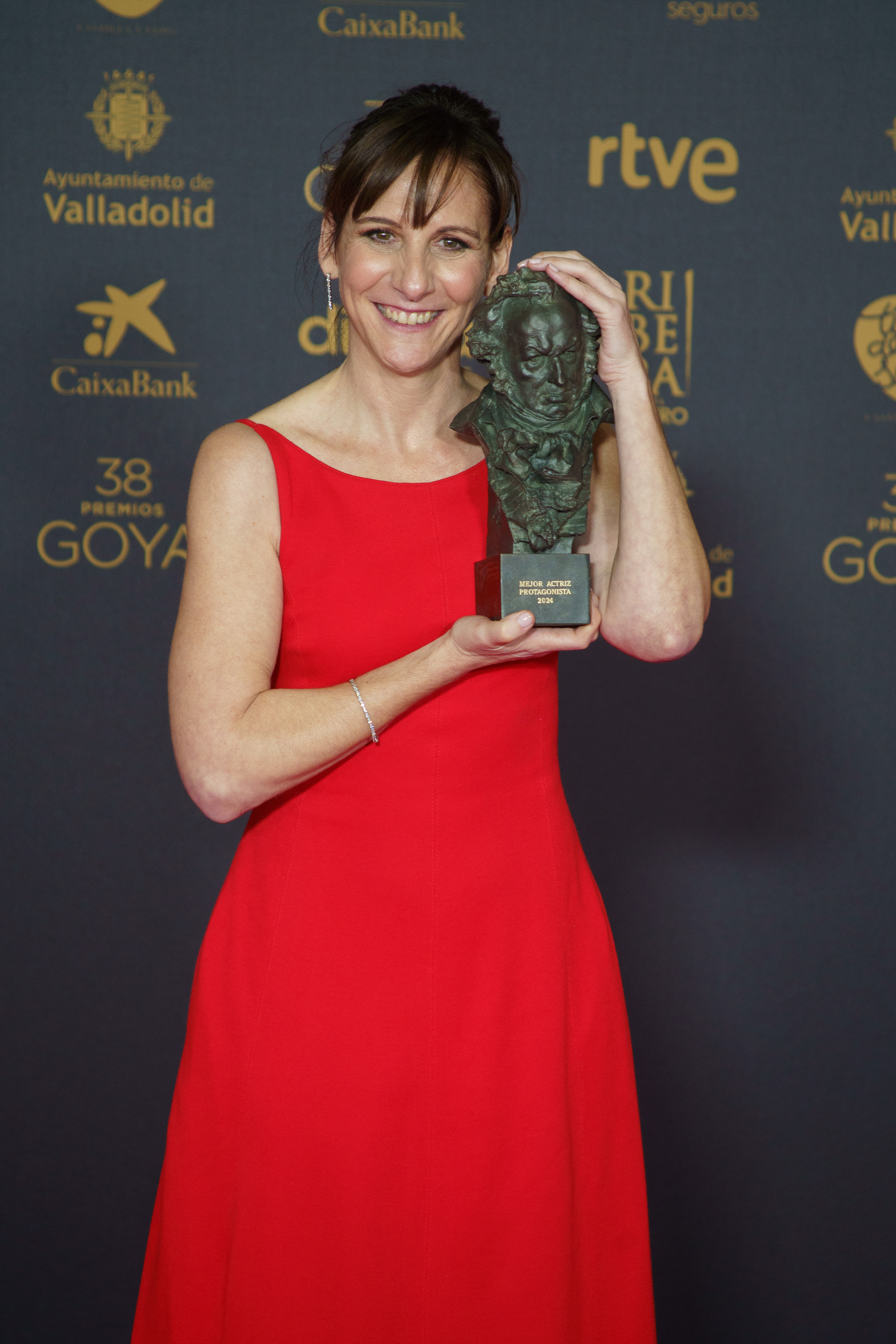
Malena Alterio, Best Actress winner.

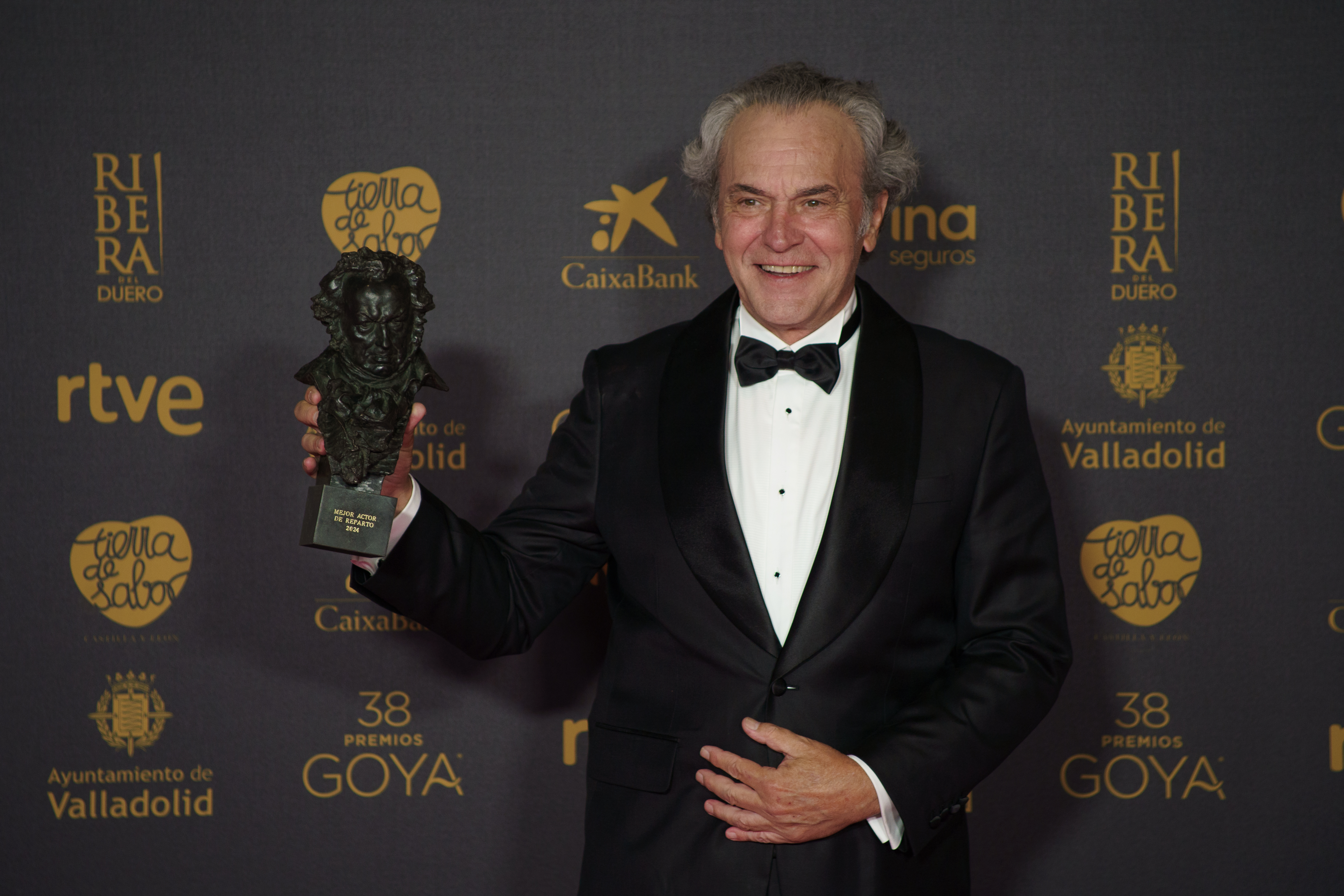
José Coronado, Best Supporting Actor winner.

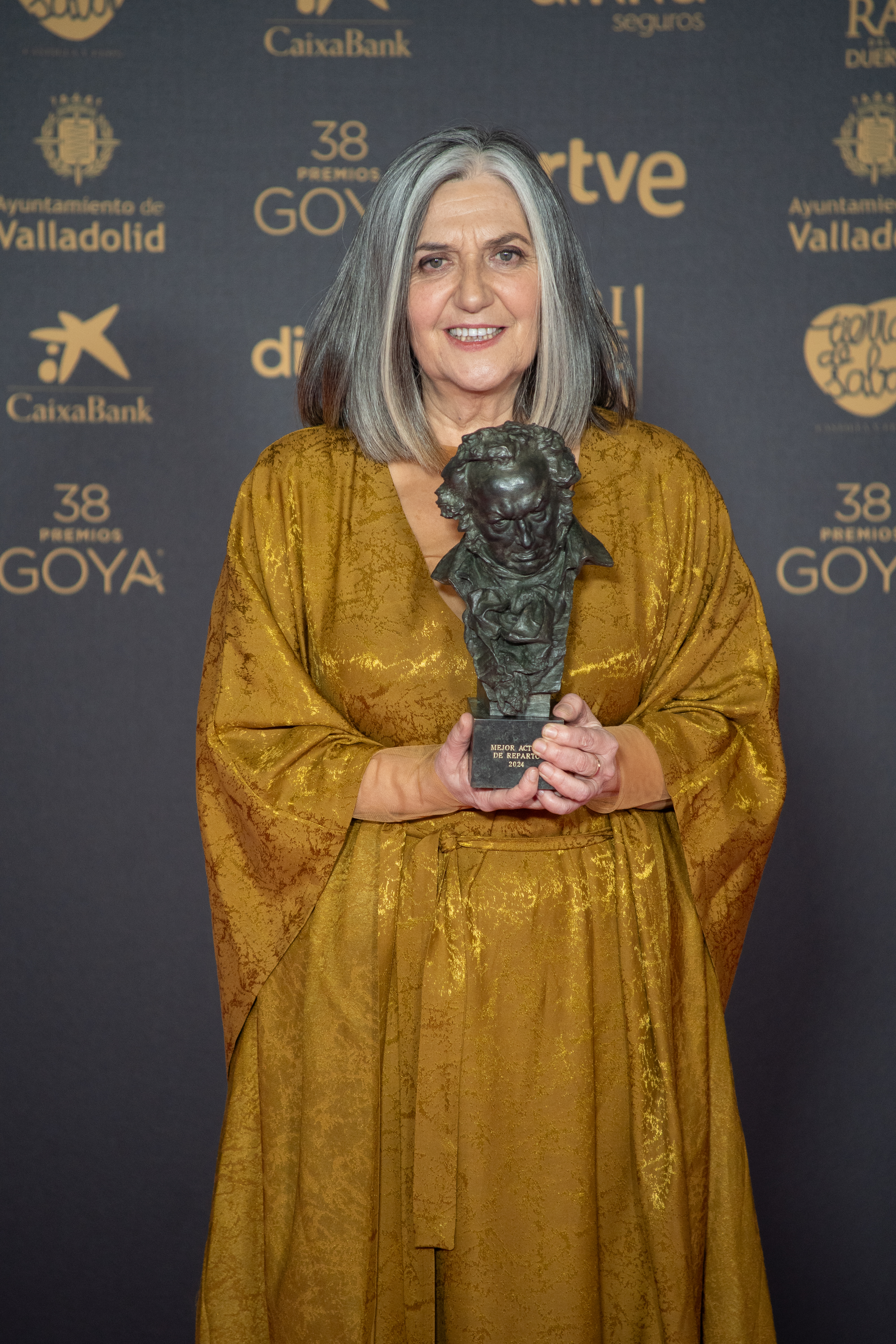
Ane Gabarain, Best Supporting Actress winner.

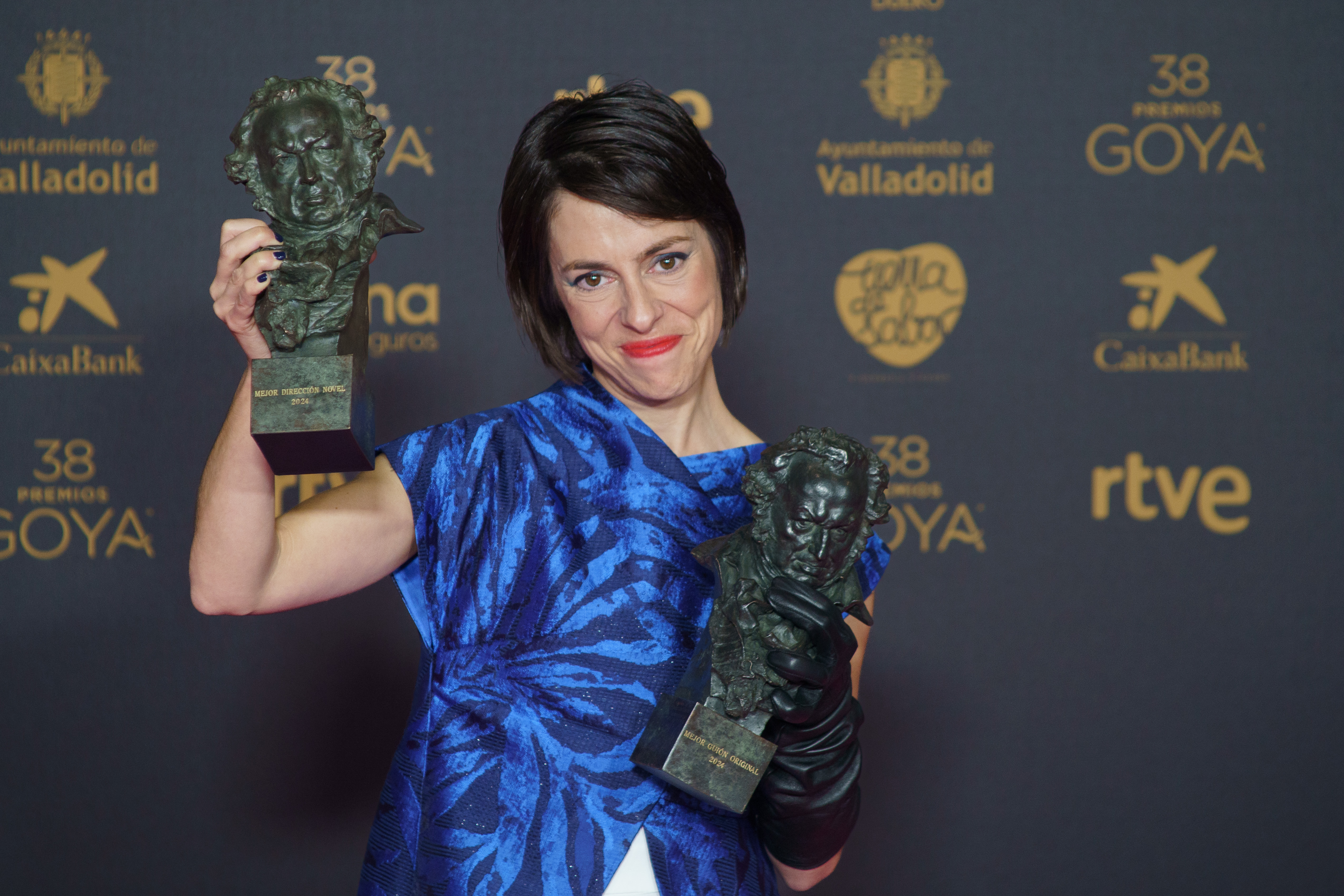
Estibaliz Urresola Solaguren, Best Original Screenplay and Best New Director winner.

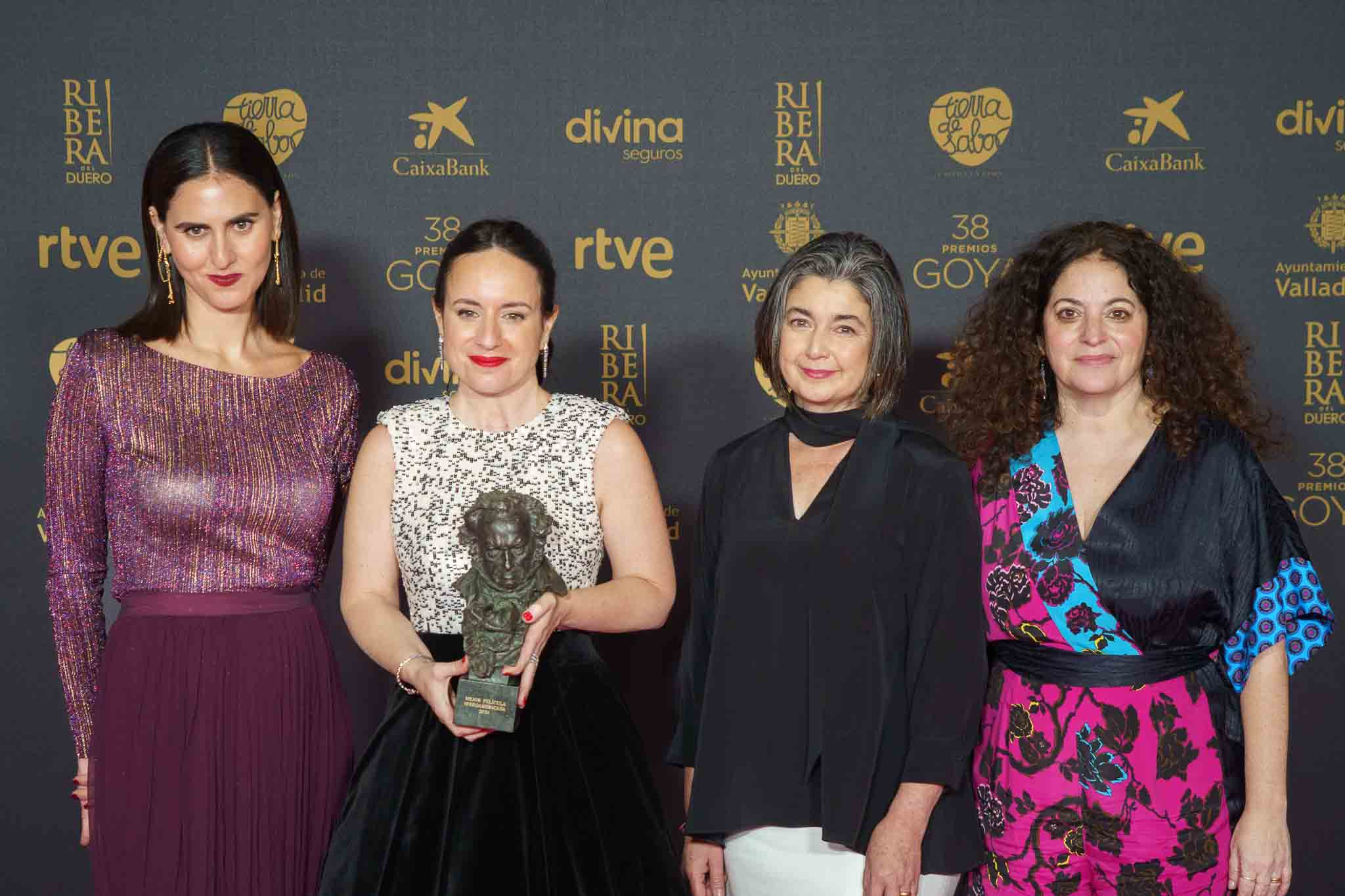
Crew of The Eternal Memory, Best Ibero-American Film winner.

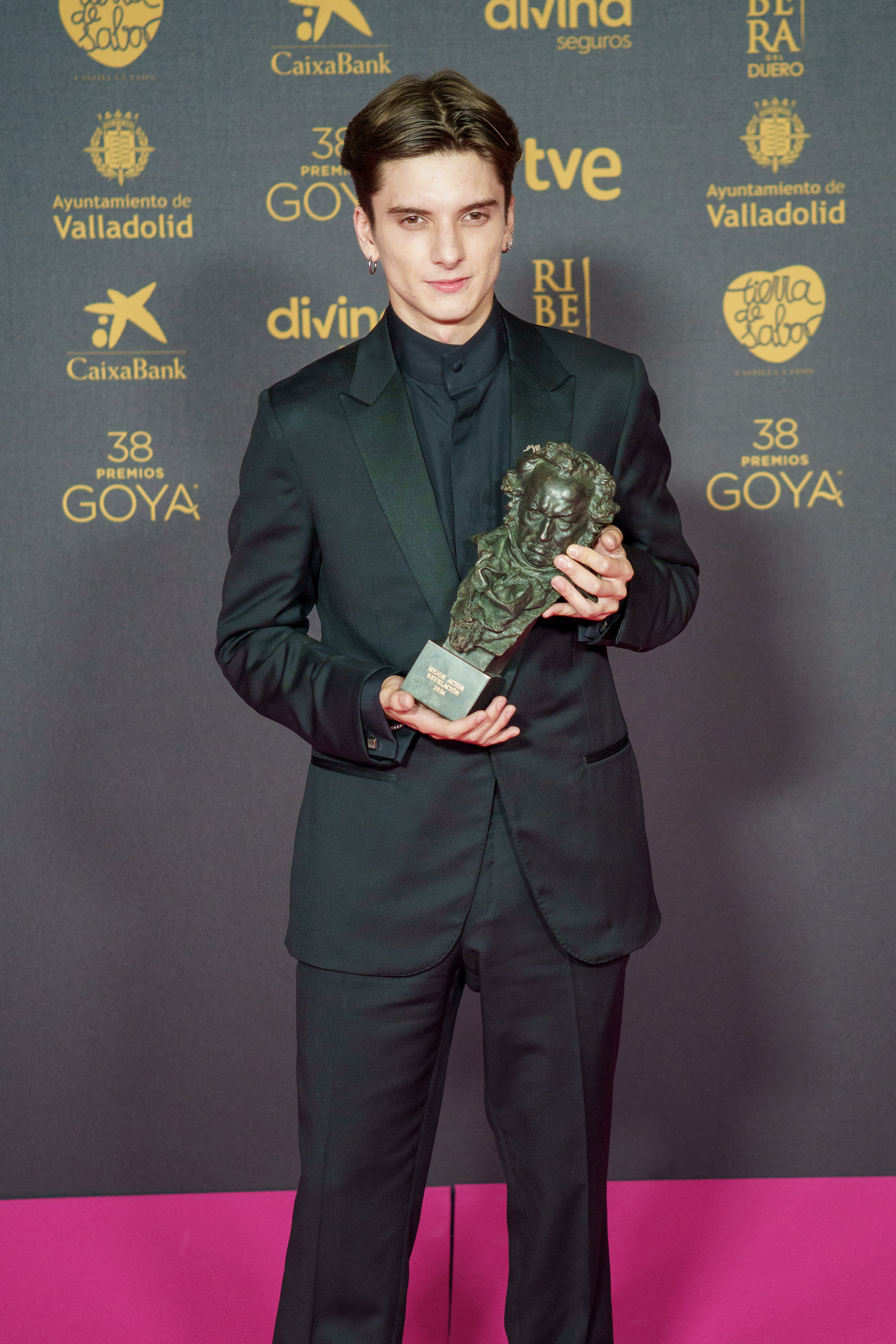
Matías Recalt, Best New Actor winner.

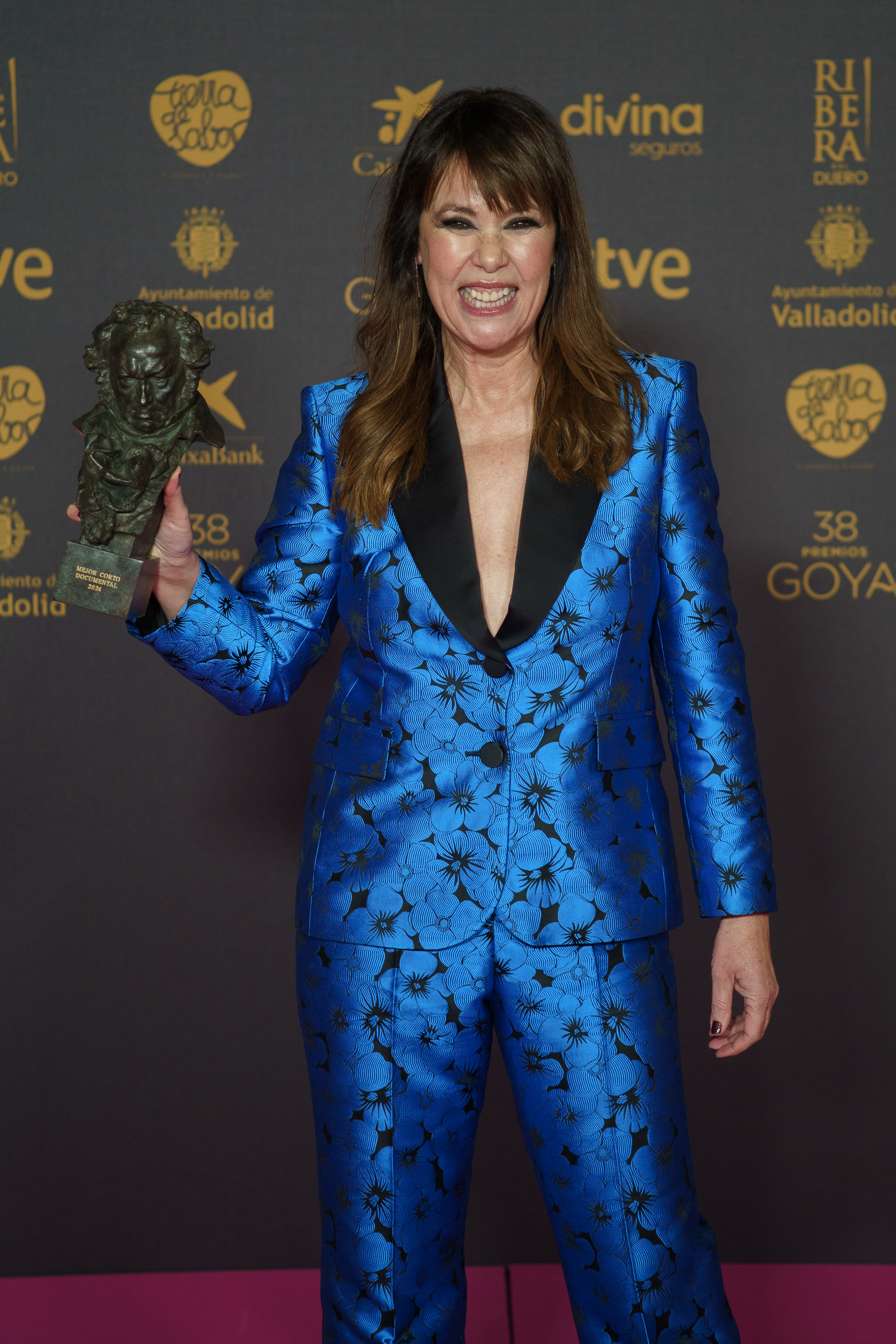
Mabel Lozano, Best Documentary Short Film winner.

Best Film: Society of the Snow – Belén Atienza, J.A. Bayona, Sandra Hermida Muñiz; 20,000 Species of Bees – Lara Izagirre Garizurieta, Valérie Delpierre; Close Your Eyes – Agustín Bossi, Cristina Zumárraga, José Alba, Maximiliano Lasansky, Odile Antonio-Baez, Pablo E. Bossi, Pol Bossi, Víctor Erice; Un amor – Marisa Fernández Armenteros, Sandra Hermida Muñiz; Jokes & Cigarettes – Edmon Roch, Jaime Ortiz de Artiñano	Best Director: J. A. Bayona – Society of the Snow; Víctor Erice – Close Your Eyes; Isabel Coixet – Un amor; David Trueba – Jokes & Cigarettes; Elena Martín – Creatura
Best Actor: David Verdaguer – Jokes & Cigarettes as Eugenio; Manolo Solo – Close Your Eyes as Miguel Garay; Enric Auquer – The Teacher Who Promised the Sea as Antoni Benaiges; Hovik Keuchkerian – Un amor as Andreas; Alberto Ammann – Upon Entry as Diego	Best Actress: Malena Alterio – Something Is About to Happen as Lucía; Patricia López Arnaiz – 20,000 Species of Bees as Ane; María Vázquez – Matria as Ramona; Laia Costa – Un amor as Nat; Carolina Yuste – Jokes & Cigarettes as Conchita
Best Supporting Actor: José Coronado – Close Your Eyes as Julio Arenas / Gardel; Martxelo Rubio – 20,000 Species of Bees as Gorka; Juan Carlos Vellido – Under Therapy as Roberto; Alex Brendemühl – Creatura as Gerard; Hugo Silva – Un amor as Piter	Best Supporting Actress: Ane Gabarain – 20,000 Species of Bees as Lourdes; Itziar Lazkano – 20,000 Species of Bees as Lita; Ana Torrent – Close Your Eyes as Ana Arenas; Luisa Gavasa – The Teacher Who Promised the Sea as Charo; Clara Segura – Creatura as Diana
Best New Actor: Matías Recalt – Society of the Snow as Roberto Canessa; Omar Banana – Love & Revolution as Miguel Acosta Fernández; Brianeitor – Championext as Himself; La Dani – Love & Revolution as Dani; Julio Hu Chen – Chinas, a Second Generation Story as Wang	Best New Actress: Janet Novás – The Rye Horn as María; Xinyi Ye – Chinas, a Second Generation Story as Claudia; Yeju Ji – Chinas, a Second Generation Story as Shul; Clàudia Malagelada – Creatura as Mila; Sara Becker – The Movie Teller as María Margarita
Best Original Screenplay: Estibaliz Urresola Solaguren – 20,000 Species of Bees; Víctor Erice, Michel Gaztambide – Close Your Eyes; Carmen Garrido, Alejandro Marín – Love & Revolution; Alejandro Rojas, Juan Sebastián Vásquez – Upon Entry; Félix Viscarret – Not Such an Easy Life	Best Adapted Screenplay: Pablo Berger — Robot Dreams; based on the graphic novel Robot Dreams by Sara Varon; Albert Val – The Teacher Who Promised the Sea; based on the book El mestre que va prometre el mar by Francesc Escribano; Bernat Vilaplana, J. A. Bayona, Jaime Marques-Olarreaga, Nicolás Casariego – Society of the Snow; based on the book La sociedad de la nieve by Pablo Vierci; Isabel Coixet, Laura Ferrero — Un amor; based on the novel Un amor by Sara Mesa; David Trueba, Albert Espinosa — Jokes & Cigarettes; based on the books Eugenio and Saben aquell que diu by Gerard Jofra
Best Ibero-American Film: The Eternal Memory · Chile; Alma Viva · Portugal; The Fishbowl · Puerto Rico; Puan · Argentina; Simón · Venezuela	Best European Film: Anatomy of a Fall · France; Aftersun · United Kingdom; The Eight Mountains · Italy; Safe Place · Croatia; The Teachers' Lounge · Germany
Best New Director: Estibaliz Urresola Solaguren – 20,000 Species of Bees; Itsaso Arana – The Girls Are Alright; Álvaro Gago – Matria; Alejandro Rojas, Juan Sebastián Vasquez – Upon Entry; Alejandro Marín – Love & Revolution	Best Animated Film: Robot Dreams – Pablo Berger, Ángel Durández, Ibon Cormenzana, Ignasi Estapé, Sandra Tapia; They Shot the Piano Player – Fernando Trueba, Javier Mariscal, Cristina Huete; Sultana's Dream – Isabel Herguera, Chelo Loureiro, Diego Herguera, Fabian Driehorst, Iván Miñambres, Mariano Baratech; Hannah and the Monsters – Ángeles Hernández, David Matamoros, Lorena Ares; Mummies – Juan Jesús García Galocha "Galo", Cleber Beretta, Francisco Celma, Jordi Gasull, Marc Sabé, Pedro Solís, Toni Novella
Best Cinematography: Pedro Luque – Society of the Snow; Gina Ferrer García – 20,000 Species of Bees; Valentín Álvarez – Close Your Eyes; Bet Rourich – Un amor; Diego Trenas – One Night with Adela	Best Editing: Andrés Gil, Jaume Martí – Society of the Snow; Raúl Barreras – 20,000 Species of Bees; Ascen Marchena – Close Your Eyes; Fátima de los Santos – Mamacruz; Fernando Franco – Robot Dreams
Best Art Direction: Alain Bainée – Society of the Snow; Izaskun Urkijo – 20,000 Species of Bees; Curru Garabal – Close Your Eyes; Carlos Conti – The Movie Teller; Marc Pou – Jokes & Cigarettes	Best Production Supervision: Margarita Huguet – Society of the Snow; Pablo Vidal – 20,000 Species of Bees; María José Díez – Close Your Eyes; Eduard Vallès – Jokes & Cigarettes; Leire Aurrekoetxea, Luis Gutiérrez – Valley of Shadows
Best Sound: Jorge Adrados, Oriol Tarragó, Marc Orts – Society of the Snow; Eva Valiño, Koldo Corella, Xanti Salvador – 20,000 Species of Bees; Iván Marín, Juan Ferro, Candela Palencia – Close Your Eyes; Tamara Arévalo, Fabiola Ordoyo, Yasmina Praderas – Championext; Xavi Mas, Eduardo Castro, Yasmina Praderas – Jokes & Cigarettes	Best Special Effects: Pau Costa, Félix Bergés, Laura Pedro – Society of the Snow; Mariano García Marty, Jon Serrano, David Heras, Fran Belda, Indira Martín – 20,000 Species of Bees; Raúl Romanillos, Míriam Piquer – Valley of Shadows; Eneritz Zapiain, Iñaki Gil "Ketxu" – The Chapel; Mariano García Marty, Jon Serrano, Juan Ventura, Amparo Martínez – Tin & Tina
Best Costume Design: Julio Suárez – Society of the Snow; Nerea Torrijos – 20,000 Species of Bees; Maria Armengol – The Teacher Who Promised the Sea; Mercè Paloma – The Movie Teller; Lala Huete – Jokes & Cigarettes	Best Makeup and Hairstyles: Ana López-Puigcerver, Belén López-Puigcerver, Montse Ribé – Society of the Snow; Aihoa Eskusabel, Jose Gabarain – 20,000 Species of Bees; Eli Adánez, Juan Begara – The Tenderness; Caitlin Acheson, Benjamín Pérez, Nacho Díaz – Jokes & Cigarettes; Sarai Rodríguez, Noé Montes, Óscar del Monte – Valley of Shadows
Best Original Score: Michael Giacchino – Society of the Snow; Natasha Arizu – The Teacher Who Promised the Sea; Arnau Bataller – The Antares Paradox; Alfonso de Vilallonga – Robot Dreams; Andrea Motis – Jokes & Cigarettes	Best Original Song: "Yo solo quiero amor" from Love & Revolution by Rigoberta Bandini; "Eco" from Friends Till Death by Xoel López; "Chinas" from Chinas, a Second Generation Story by Marina Herlop; "El amor de Andrea" from Andrea's Love by Álvaro B. Baglietto, David García, Guille Galván, Jorge González, Juan Pedro Martín "Pucho", Juanma Latorre, Valeria Castro; "La gallinita" from The Permanent Picture by Fernando Moreri Haberman, Sergio Bertran
Best Fictional Short Film: Aunque es de noche – Guillermo García López, Damien Megherbi, David Casas Riesco, Justin Pechberty, Marina García López, Pablo de la Chica; Carta a mi madre para mi hijo – Carla Simón, María Zamora Morcillo; Cuentas divinas – Eulàlia Ramon, Anna Saura; La loca y el feminista – Sandra Gallego, María del Puy Alvarado, Penélope Cristóbal; Paris 70 – Dani Feixas, Alba Forn	Best Animated Short Film: To Bird or Not To Bird – Martín Romero, Chelo Loureiro, Iván Miñambres; Becarias – Marina Cortón, Marina Donderis, Núria Poveda, Iván Madolell, Leticia Montalvá, Pablo Muñoz Naharro, Vicente Mallols; Todo bien – Diana Acién Manzorro, Rocío Benavent Méndez; Todo está perdido – Carla Pereira, Juanfran Jacinto, Álvaro Díaz, David Castro González, Jorge Acosta; Txotxongiloa – Sonia Estévez
Best Documentary Film: While You're Still You – Claudia Pinto Emperador, Iván Martínez-Rufat, Joana M. Ortueta, Jordi Llorca, Óscar Bernàcer, Pilar Llorca; Caleta Palace – José Antonio Hergueta, Leticia Salvago Soto; Contigo, contigo y sin mí, – Amaya Villar Navascués, Carlo D'Ursi; This Excessive Ambition – Antón Álvarez, Cristina Trenas, Isabel Utrera Alfaro, María Rubio, Patricia Alfaro, Rogelio González, Santos Bacana; Iberia, naturaleza infinita – Arturo Menor Campillo, Cristina Menor	Best Documentary Short Film: Ava – Mabel Lozano; BLOW! – Neus Ballús, Miriam Porté; El bus – Sandra Reina, Jaime Fargas Coll, Valérie Delpierre; Herederas – Silvia Venegas Venegas, Juan Antonio Moreno Amador; Una terapia de mierda – Javier Polo, Jorge Acosta, Juanjo Moscardó Rius, Maxi Valero, Nathalie Martínez

=== Honorary Goya ===
In October 2023, director of photography, film restorer and film researcher Juan Mariné was announced as the recipient of the Honorary Goya Award.

=== International Goya ===
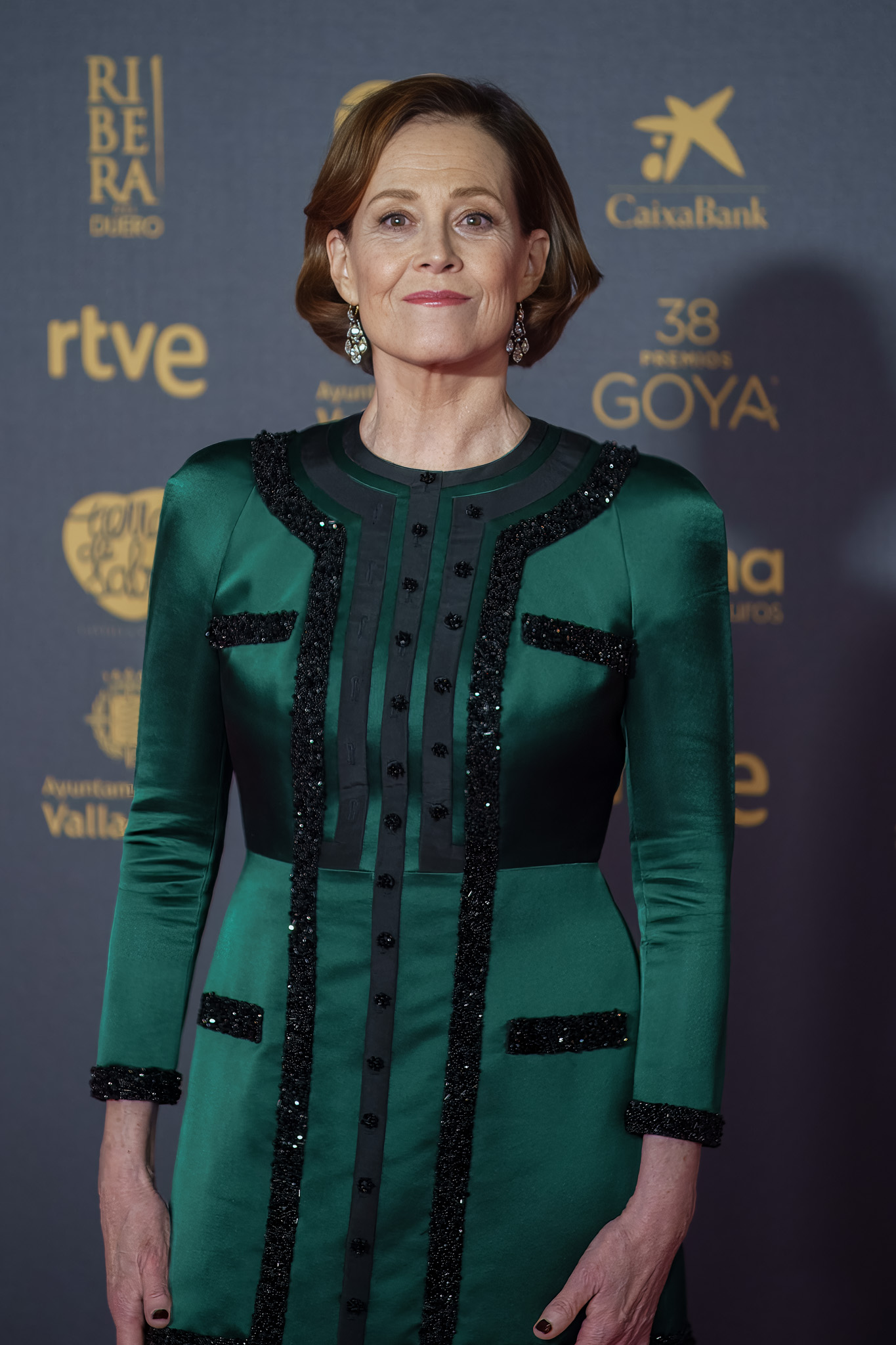
Sigourney Weaver, International Honorary Goya recipient.

In February 2024, actress Sigourney Weaver was announced as the recipient of the International Goya Award. In her award acceptance speech, Weaver thanked the work of her customary voice actress in Spain's Spanish dubs, María Luisa Solá.

=== Films with multiple nominations and awards ===
Films with multiple nominations
Nominations	Film
15	20,000 Species of Bees
13	Society of the Snow
11	Close Your Eyes
11	Jokes & Cigarettes
7	Un amor
5	The Teacher Who Promised the Sea
5	Love & Revolution
4	Creatura
4	Robot Dreams
4	Chinas, a Second Generation Story
3	Upon Entry
3	The Movie Teller
3	Valley of Shadows
2	Matria
2	Championext

Films with multiple awards
Awards	Film
12	Society of the Snow
3	20,000 Species of Bees
2	Robot Dreams

== In Memoriam ==
The In Memoriam tribute, accompanied by a musical performing by Sílvia Pérez Cruz, Salvador Sobral, and Marta Roma, who sang Procuro olvidarte, paid tribute to the following individuals:

- Gonzalo Abril, dubbing actor
- Antonio Acaso, dubbing actor
- Narcís Agustí
- Alfredo Alba de Luz, assistant director
- Francisco Rodríguez Iglesias (Arévalo), humorist and actor
- Jordi Artigau
- Joaquín Barral Casado
- Jesús Barreda, dubbing actor
- Miguel Barroso, writer
- María Bellapart, scriptwriter
- Rocío Borrallo, actress
- Isaac Bravo (Sasi), actor
- Fermín Cabal, director and screenwriter
- Lluís Miquel Campos, singer-songwriter and producer
- Luisa Cantero (la Tata)
- Pilar Cañada, tv presenter
- Amat Carreras i Doll, film editor
- Angela Cassillas Gordillo, costume design
- Antonio Castro, director and screenwriter
- Itziar Castro, actress
- Jose Antonio Cepeda, director and screenwriter
- Isabel Steva (Colita), photographer
- Santiago Cortés, actor and dubbing director
- Basilio Cortijo Oter, special effect technician
- Daniela Acosta, actress
- Josep Costa Prieto, actor and director
- Pepe Esquirol, sound engineer
- Rafael Fernández, journalist and screenplayer
- Patricia Ferreira, director and screenwriter
- Alberto Gadea, actor and stuntman
- Antonio Gala, poet and dramatist
- Andrés García, actor
- Rosa García, producer
- Rafael Girón Galván, producer
- Laura Gómez-Lacueva, actress
- Dolores González (Lola), actress
- Manel G. Frasquiel, film editor
- Josefina Güell, actress
- Fernando Guijarro
- Jesús Guzmán, actor
- Fernando Huertas Jiménez, screenwriter and director
- Rebeca Iannaccone, assistant director
- Francisco Ibáñez, strip cartoonist
- Daniel Iturbe, producer
- María Jiménez, singer, dancer and actress
- Àngel Jové, actor, screenwriter and artistic director
- Eduardo Ladrón de Guevara, screenwriter
- Tony Leblanc Jr., actor
- Lucie J. Lipschutz, screenwriter
- Ignacio López Tarso, actor
- Rodrigo López Terres, camera operator
- Mauricio Lozano, producer assistant
- Antonella Lualdi, actress
- Paco Lucio, director and teacher
- Francisco J. Madurga, cinematography director
- Raúl Martín (Raw)
- Jesús Ignacio M. Povedano, costume designer
- Mª Carmen y sus muñecos, ventriloquist, comedian and actress
- Mario Más, progammer
- Juli Mira, actor
- Bernardo Moll, director and producer
- Mauro Muñiz de Urquiza, actor and comedian
- Ana Ofelia Murguía, actress
- Pío Núñez Rodríguez, producer
- Ramiro Oliveros, actor
- Antonio Ordóñez Hernández
- Severino Pascual Aceves, producer
- Carles Pastor, director, producer and screenwriter
- Raúl Peña, screenwriter and director
- Julio Peña, film editor
- Manuel Pérez Estremera, screenwriter and producer
- Víctor Petit, actor
- Francisco de la Plaza
- Ventura Pons, director, screenwriter and producer
- Carlos Pumares, film critic and journalist
- Enrique Requena Ruiz
- José Luis Rubio, sound technician
- José Ruiz Lifante, actor
- Jerónimo Saavedra, dubbing actor
- Manuel Sánchez Gregorio
- Pelayo Sánchez
- Luis Mª Santamaría Tejón
- Vicente Sempere Sempere
- Carmen Sevilla, actress and singer
- María Silva, actress
- Pepe Soriano, actor and director
- Rafael Tamarit, dubbing actor
- Arnold Taraborrelli, choreographer
- Carlos Tena, journalist and musician critic
- Maite Tójar, actress
- Enrique de la Torre, actor
- Laura Valenzuela, television presenter and actress
- Concha Velasco, actress
- Mauricio Vicent, director, screenwriter and journalist
- Ernesto Victoria
- Francisco Vidal, actor
- Jordi Vila, dubbing actor
- Paco Villar, producer
- Manuel Zambrana, cinematography director

== See also ==
- 3rd Carmen Awards
- 16th Gaudí Awards
- 11th Feroz Awards
