= Jokes & Cigarettes =

- Theatrical release poster
- Catalan: Saben aquell
- Directed by: David Trueba
- Screenplay by: David Trueba; Albert Espinosa
- Story by
- Based on: Eugenio and Saben aquell que diu by Gerard Jofra
- Produced by: Edmon Roch; Jaime Ortiz de Artiñano
- Starring: David Verdaguer; Carolina Yuste
- Cinematography: Sergi Vilanova
- Edited by: Marta Velasco
- Music by: Andrea Motis
- Production companies: Ikiru Films; Atresmedia Cine; La Terraza Films
- Distributed by: Warner Bros. Pictures
- Release date: 1 November 2023
- Country: Spain
- Languages: Catalan; Spanish
- Box office: €0.94 million

Jokes & Cigarettes (Catalan: Saben aquell) is a 2023 Spanish biographical drama film directed by David Trueba from a screenplay by Trueba and Albert Espinosa which stars David Verdaguer as comedian Eugenio alongside Carolina Yuste. It features Catalan- and Spanish-language dialogue.

== Plot ==
Set from 1967 to 1980, the plot follows the onstage beginnings of Eugenio Jofra, a jeweller from Barcelona, as well as his relationship with love interest Conchita, whom he begins to perform in a musical duo, 'Els Dos'. Eugenio ends up improvising solo stand-up comedy shows upon Conchita's sudden absence.

== Cast ==
- David Verdaguer as Eugenio
- Carolina Yuste as Conchita
- Pedro Casablanc as Vicente
- Marina Salas as Mari Carmen
- Ramon Fontserè as Amadeu
- Cristina Hoyos as Conchita's mother
- Boris Ruiz as Eugenio's father
- Matilde Muñiz as Eugenio's mother

Cameo roles include Lara Dibildos as her mother Laura Valenzuela, Paco Plaza as Chicho Ibáñez Serrador, and Pedro Ruiz as himself.

== Production ==
The screenplay was penned by Albert Espinosa based on the books Eugenio and Saben aquell que diu by Gerard Jofra, Eugenio's son. The film is an Ikiru Films, Atresmedia Cine and La Terraza Films production, and it had the participation of Atresmedia, Movistar+, and HBO Max and backing from ICEC and TVC. Trueba advised Verdaguer not to obsess about impersonating Eugenio, telling Verdaguer that he was not [popular impersonator] Carlos Latre, but primarily about getting the hang of [Eugenio's] energy. Verdaguer used nonetheless a prosthetic nose and a prosthetic ass. Carolina Yuste worked for three months with a diction coach to improve her Catalan-language skills. Shooting locations included Barcelona. The film was lensed by Sergi Vilanova and featured the music of Andrea Motis.

== Release ==
The film was released theatrically in Spain by Warner Bros. Pictures on 1 November 2023.

== Reception ==
According to the American review aggregation website Rotten Tomatoes, Jokes & Cigarettes has a 100% approval rating based on 7 reviews from critics, with an average rating of 7.4/10.

Raquel Hernández Luján of HobbyConsolas rated the film with 85 points ('very good'), highlighting the screenplay, the setting, and a "masterful" Carolina Yuste.

J. Picatoste Verdejo of Mondo Sonoro rated the film with 7 out of 10 points, describing it as "a film far from sensationalism, warm and romantic".

Blai Morell of Fotogramas rated the film 4 out of 5 stars, highlighting the Verdaguer/Yuste duo as the best thing about the film.

Rubén Romero Santos of Cinemanía rated the film 3½ out of 5 stars, predicting Verdaguer as the foregone Goya Award winner for his performance in his verdict.

=== Top ten lists ===
The film appeared on a number of critics' top ten lists of the best Spanish films of 2023:

- 3rd — El Español (Series & Más consensus)
- 4th — Mondosonoro (consensus)
- 9th — El Periódico de Catalunya (critics)

== Accolades ==
Year	Award	Category	Nominee(s)	Result	Ref.
2023	29th Forqué Awards	Best Actor in a Film	David Verdaguer	Won	
2024	11th Feroz Awards	Best Actor in a Film	David Verdaguer	Won	
2024	11th Feroz Awards	Best Actress in a Film	Carolina Yuste	Nominated	
2024	11th Feroz Awards	Best Trailer	Miguel Ángel Sanantonio	Nominated	
2024	16th Gaudí Awards	Best Film		Nominated	
2024	16th Gaudí Awards	Best Director	David Trueba	Nominated	
2024	16th Gaudí Awards	Best Adapted Screenplay	David Trueba, Albert Espinosa	Nominated	
2024	16th Gaudí Awards	Best Actor	David Verdaguer	Won	
2024	16th Gaudí Awards	Best Actress	Carolina Yuste	Won	
2024	16th Gaudí Awards	Best Supporting Actor	Pedro Casablanc	Nominated	
2024	16th Gaudí Awards	Best Original Score	Andrea Motis	Nominated	
2024	16th Gaudí Awards	Best Art Direction	Marc Pou	Won	
2024	16th Gaudí Awards	Best Production Supervision	Eduard Vallés	Won	
2024	16th Gaudí Awards	Best Costume Design	Lala Huete	Won	
2024	16th Gaudí Awards	Best Makeup and Hairstyles	Caitlin Acheson, Nacho Días, Benjamín Pérez	Won	
2024	16th Gaudí Awards	Best Visual Effects	Wesley Barnard, Míriam Piquer	Nominated	
2024	16th Gaudí Awards	Best Sound	Xavi Mas, Eduardo Castro, Yasmina Praderas	Won	
2024	79th CEC Medals	Best Film		Nominated	
2024	79th CEC Medals	Best Adapted Screenplay	Albert Espinosa, David Trueba	Nominated	
2024	79th CEC Medals	Best Actor	David Verdaguer	Won	
2024	79th CEC Medals	Best Actress	Carolina Yuste	Nominated	
2024	79th CEC Medals	Best Supporting Actor	Pedro Casablanc	Nominated	
2024	79th CEC Medals	Best Cinematography	Sergi Vilanova Claudín	Nominated	
2024	79th CEC Medals	Best Editing	Marta Velasco	Nominated	
2024	38th Goya Awards	Best Film		Nominated	
2024	38th Goya Awards	Best Director	David Trueba	Nominated	
2024	38th Goya Awards	Best Adapted Screenplay	David Trueba, Albert Espinosa	Nominated	
2024	38th Goya Awards	Best Actress	Carolina Yuste	Nominated	
2024	38th Goya Awards	Best Actor	David Verdaguer	Won	
2024	38th Goya Awards	Best Original Score	Andrea Motis	Nominated	
2024	38th Goya Awards	Best Sound	Xavi Mas, Eduardo Castro, Yasmina Praderas	Nominated	
2024	38th Goya Awards	Best Art Direction	Marc Pou	Nominated	
2024	38th Goya Awards	Best Production Supervision	Eduard Vallès	Nominated	
2024	38th Goya Awards	Best Costume Design	Lala Huete	Nominated	
2024	38th Goya Awards	Best Makeup and Hairstyles	Caitlin Acheson, Benjamín Pérez, Nacho Díaz	Nominated	
2024	32nd Actors and Actresses Union Awards	Best Film Actor in a Leading Role	David Verdaguer	Won	
2024	32nd Actors and Actresses Union Awards	Best Film Actress in a Leading Role	Carolina Yuste	Nominated	
2024	11th Platino Awards	Best Actor	David Verdaguer	Nominated	
2024	11th Platino Awards	Best Actress	Carolina Yuste	Nominated	

== See also ==
- List of Spanish films of 2023
