= The Permanent Picture =

2023 film by Laura Ferrés

- Theatrical release poster
- Catalan: La imatge permanent
- Directed by: Laura Ferrés
- Written by: Laura Ferrés; Carlos Vermut (collaboration); Ulises Porra (collaboration)
- Produced by: Adrià Monés Murlans; Gabrielle Dumon
- Starring: María Luengo; Rosario Ortega
- Cinematography: Agnès Piqué Corbera
- Edited by: Aina Calleja
- Music by: Fernando Moresi Haberman; Sergio Bertran
- Production companies: Fasten Films; Permanent Picture AIE; Le Bureau; Materia Cinema
- Distributed by: La Aventura
- Release dates: 6 August 2023 (Locarno); 17 November 2023 (Spain)
- Running time: 94 minutes
- Countries: Spain; France
- Languages: Catalan; Spanish
- Box office: $11,914

The Permanent Picture (Catalan: La imatge permanent) is a 2023 Spanish-French drama film directed by Laura Ferrés in her feature debut, from a screenplay written by Ferrés with the collaboration of Carlos Vermut and Ulises Porra. It stars newcomers María Luengo and Rosario Ortega.

The film competed for the Golden Leopard at the 76th Locarno Film Festival. It won the Golden Spike at the 68th Valladolid International Film Festival. It is the first film in Catalan to receive the distinction.

== Plot ==
Antonia, a young mother living in the south of Spain, disappears one night due to repression in her village. 50 years later, in the north, Carmen, an introverted casting director, is looking for a "normal" person who has just arrived in the city to use in a campaign for a political party. In her search, she meets Antonia, a saleswoman with whom she shares much more than meets the eye.

== Cast ==
- María Luengo as Carmen
- Rosario Ortega as Antonia
- Saraida Llamas
- Claudia Fimia
- Mila Collado
- Dolores Martínez

== Production ==
The film was written by Ferrés with the collaboration of Carlos Vermut and Ulises Porra. It was produced by Fasten Films, in co-production with Permanent Picture AIE, Le Bureau (France) and Materia Cinema.

The film was shot primarily in Prat de Llobregat.

== Release ==
The Permanent Picture was selected to compete for the Golden Leopard at the 76th Locarno Film Festival, where it had its world premiere on 6 August 2023.

It was theatrically released on 17 November 2023 by La Aventura.

== Reception ==
=== Top ten lists ===
The film also appeared on a number of critics' top ten lists of the best Spanish films of 2023:

- 7th — El Cultural (critics)
- 8th — El Mundo (Luis Martínez)

=== Accolades ===
| Award | Date of ceremony | Category | Recipient(s) | Result | Ref. |
|---|---|---|---|---|---|
| Feroz Awards | 26 January 2024 | 'Arrebato' Special Award (Fiction) | The Permanent Picture | Nominated | |
| Gaudí Awards | 4 February 2024 | Best Film | The Permanent Picture | Nominated | |
| Gaudí Awards | 4 February 2024 | Best New Director | Laura Ferrés Moreno | Nominated | |
| Gaudí Awards | 4 February 2024 | Best Cinematography | Agnès Piqué Corbera | Nominated | |
| Goya Awards | 10 February 2024 | Best Original Song | "La gallinita" by Fernando Moresi Haberman & Sergio Bertran | Nominated | |
| Locarno Film Festival | 12 August 2023 | Golden Leopard | The Permanent Picture | Nominated | |
| Valladolid International Film Festival | 28 October 2023 | Golden Spike | The Permanent Picture | Won | |
