= 16th Gaudí Awards =

- Date: 4 February 2024
- Site: CCIB, Barcelona, Catalonia, Spain
- Hosted by: Maria Rovira; Ana Polo

Highlights
- Best Film: Creatura
- Best Direction: Elena Martín; Creatura
- Best Actor: David Verdaguer; Jokes & Cigarettes
- Best Actress: Carolina Yuste; Jokes & Cigarettes
- Most awards: Creatura & Jokes & Cigarettes (6)
- Most nominations: Creatura (15)

The 16th Gaudí Awards ceremony, presented by the Catalan Film Academy, took place on 4 February 2024 at the CCIB complex in Barcelona.

== Background ==
A record number of 81 productions were presented as candidates to the awards, of which a 40% had Catalan as the original language, with 13 candidates to the best fiction feature film in the Catalan language. Journalist-comedian Maria Rovira and screenwriter-comedian Ana Polo (co-creators of the popular Catalan podcast Oye Polo) were announced as the gala hosts in October 2023. In November 2023, filmmaker Rosa Vergés was announced as the recipient of the Gaudí Honorary Award. The nominations were read by actors Vicky Luengo and Pol López from the auditorium of La Pedrera on 12 December 2023. Elena Martín Gimeno's Creatura led the nominations with fifteen, followed by David Trueba's Jokes & Cigarettes with thirteen.

== Winners and nominees ==
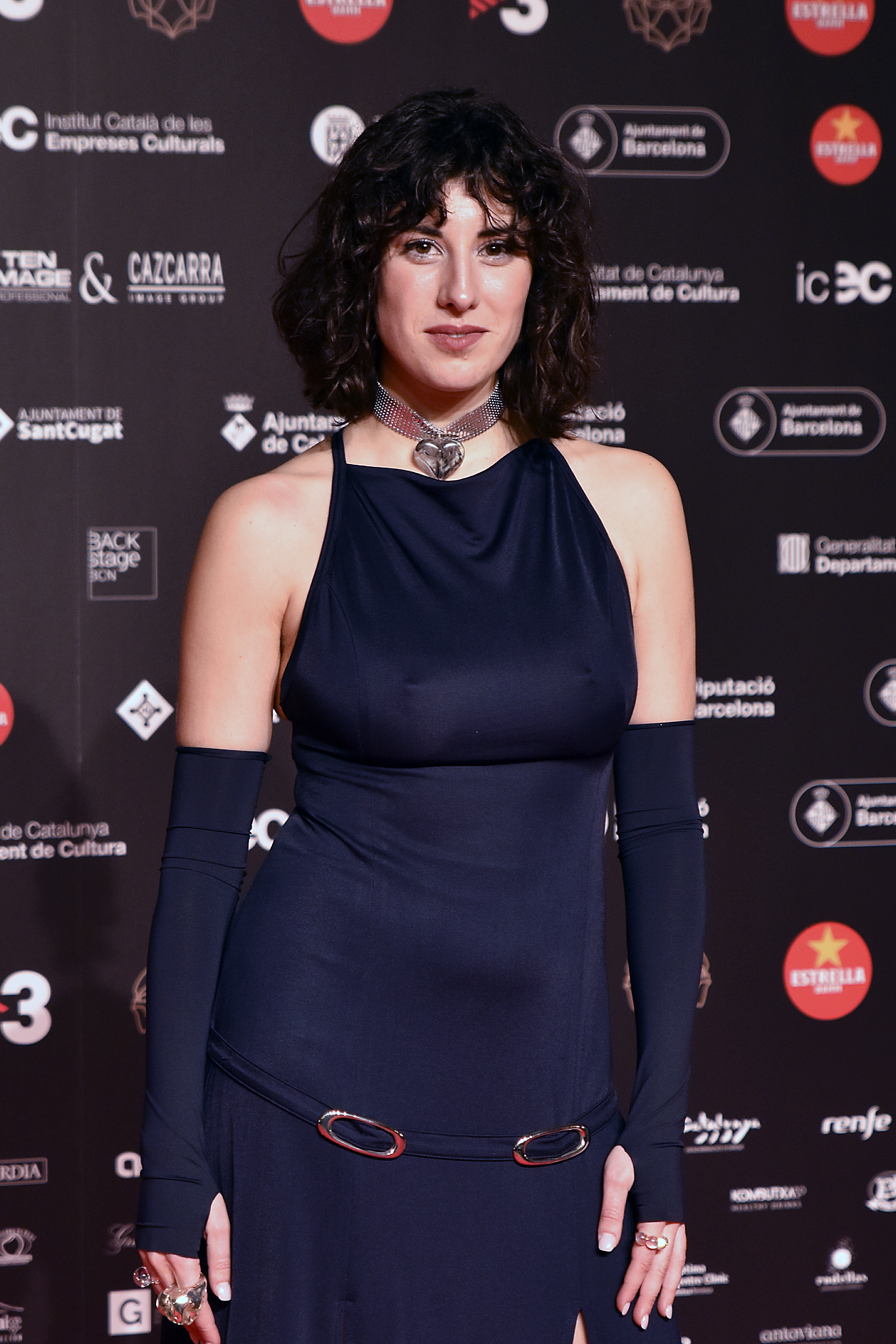
Elena Martín, Best Director winner.

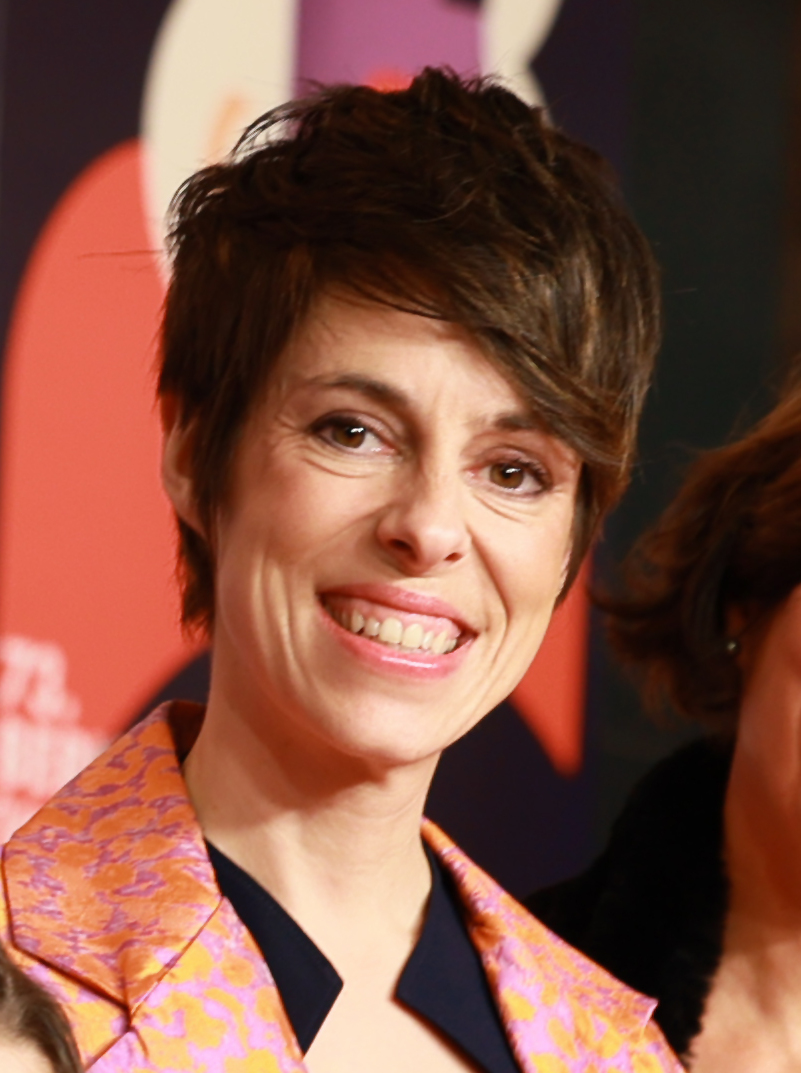
Estibaliz Urresola Solaguren, Best New Director winner.

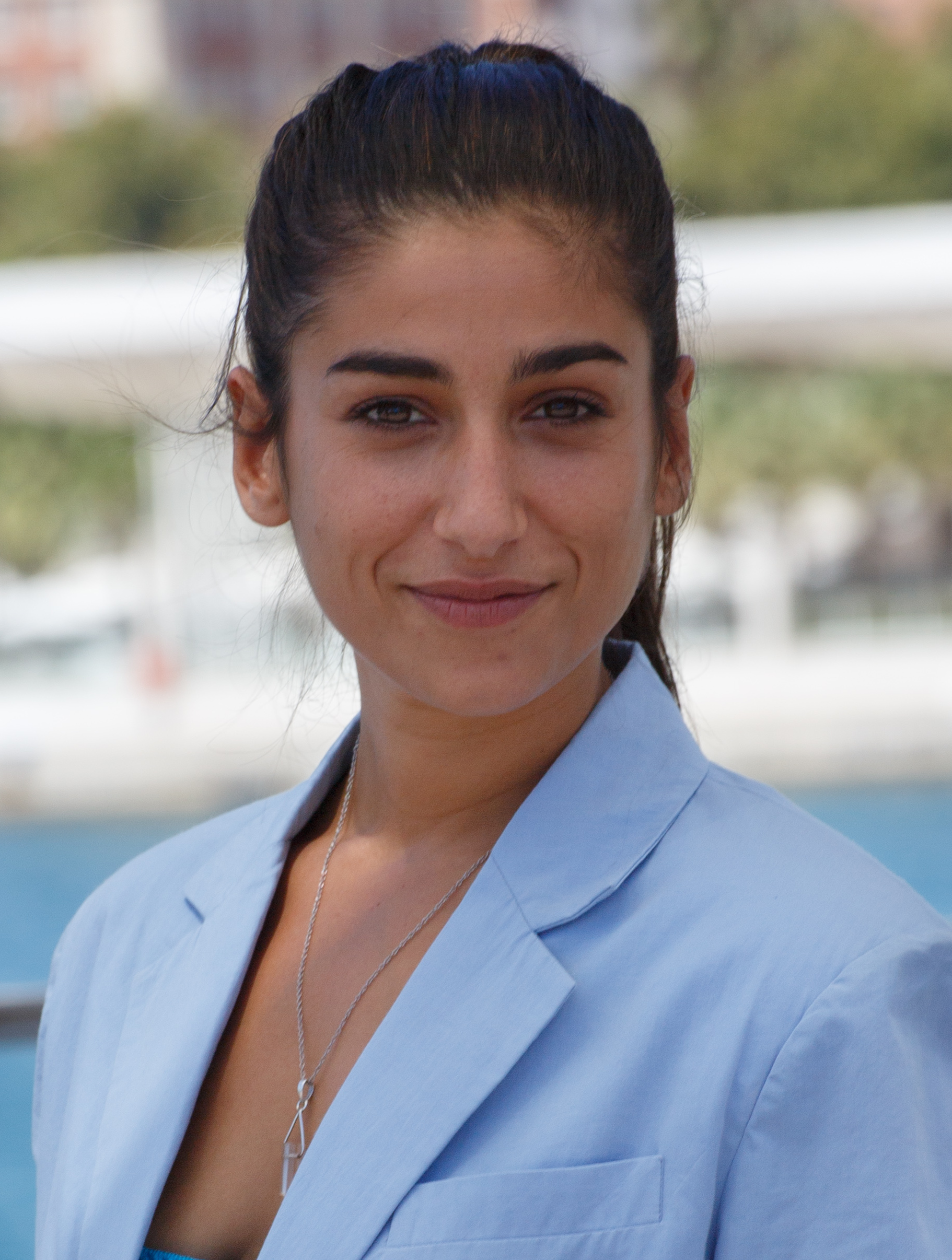
Carolina Yuste, Best Actress winner.

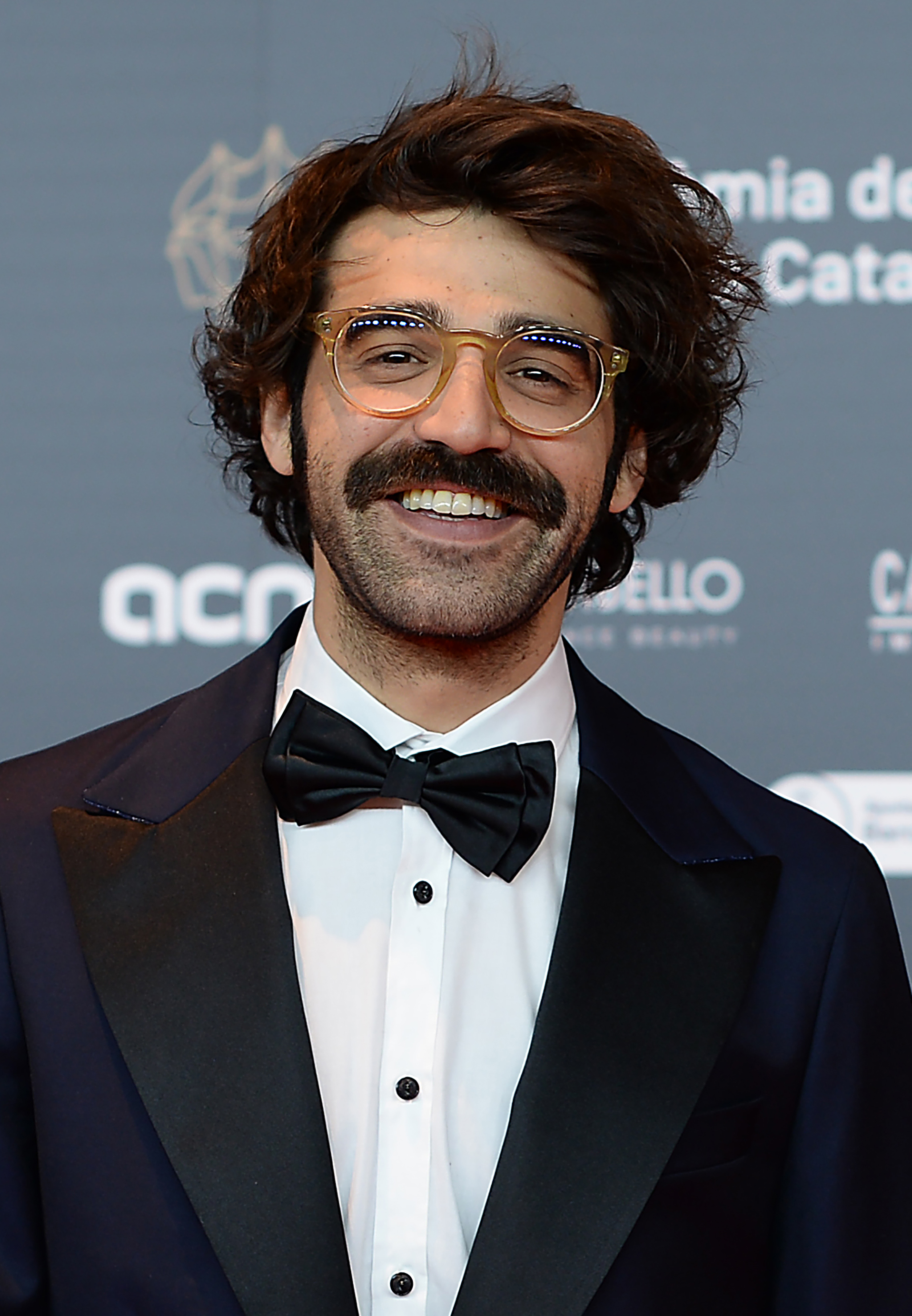
David Verdaguer, Best Actor winner.

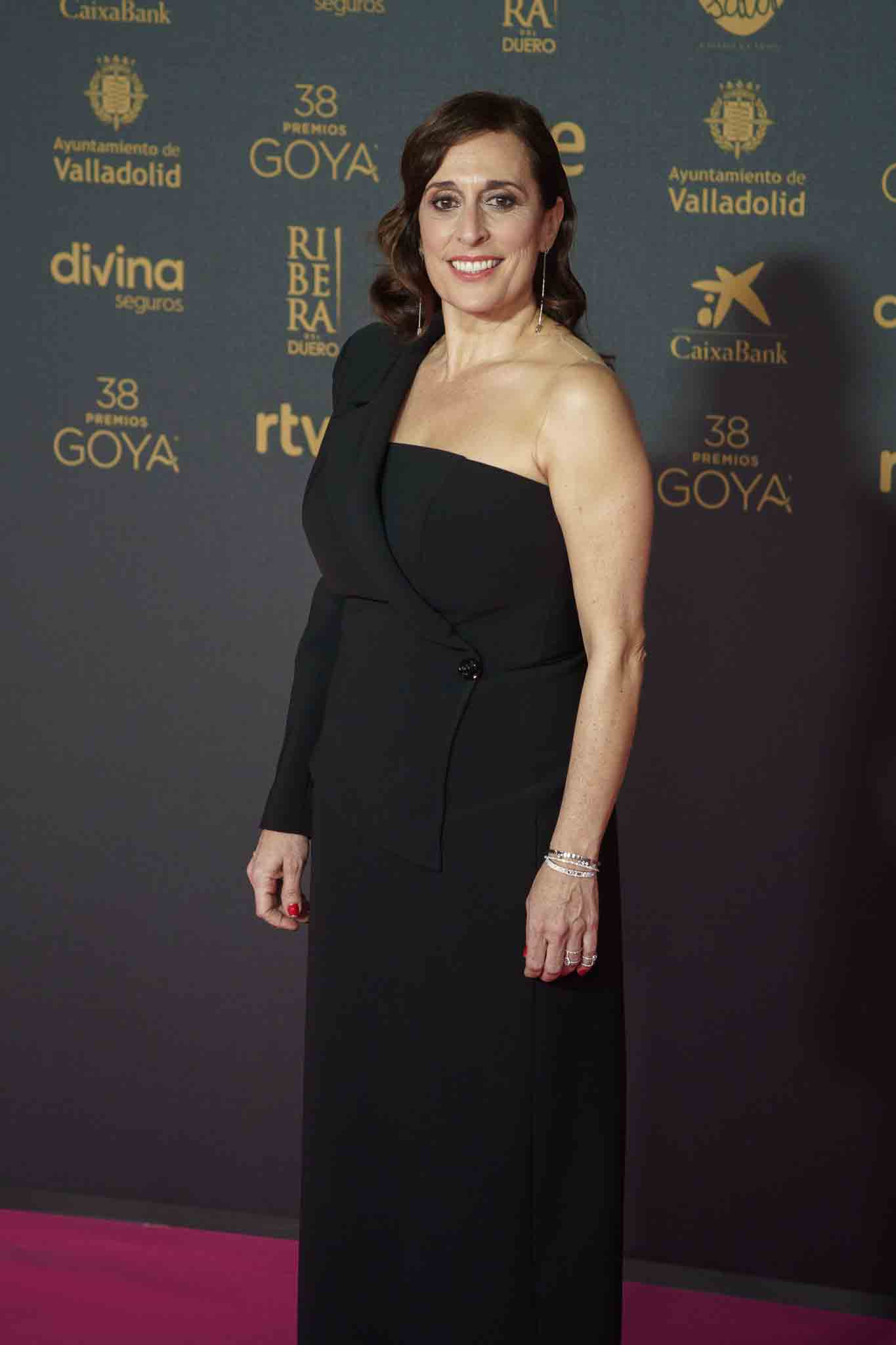
Clara Segura, Best Supporting Actress winner.

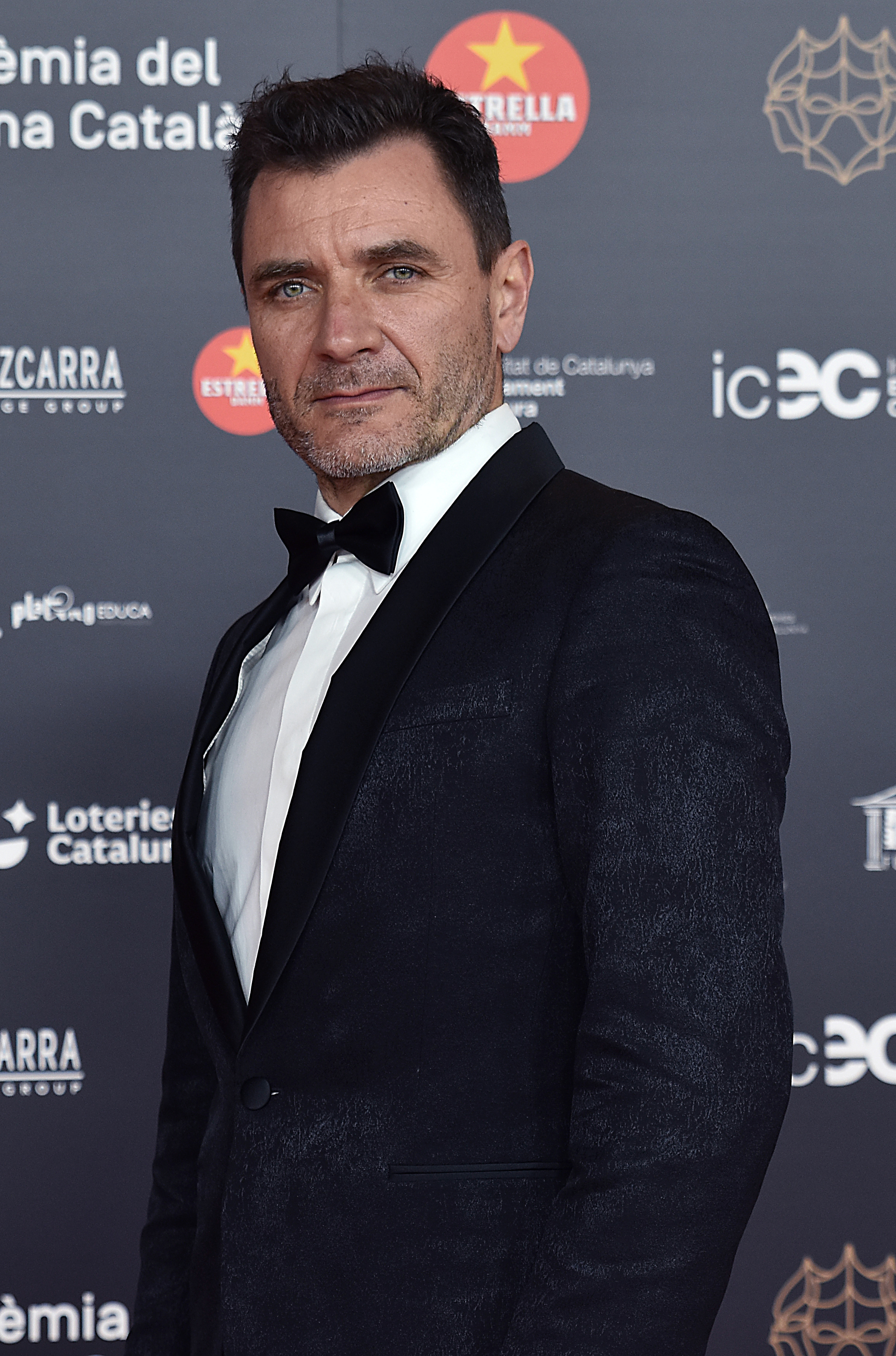
Àlex Brendemühl, Best Supporting Actor winner.

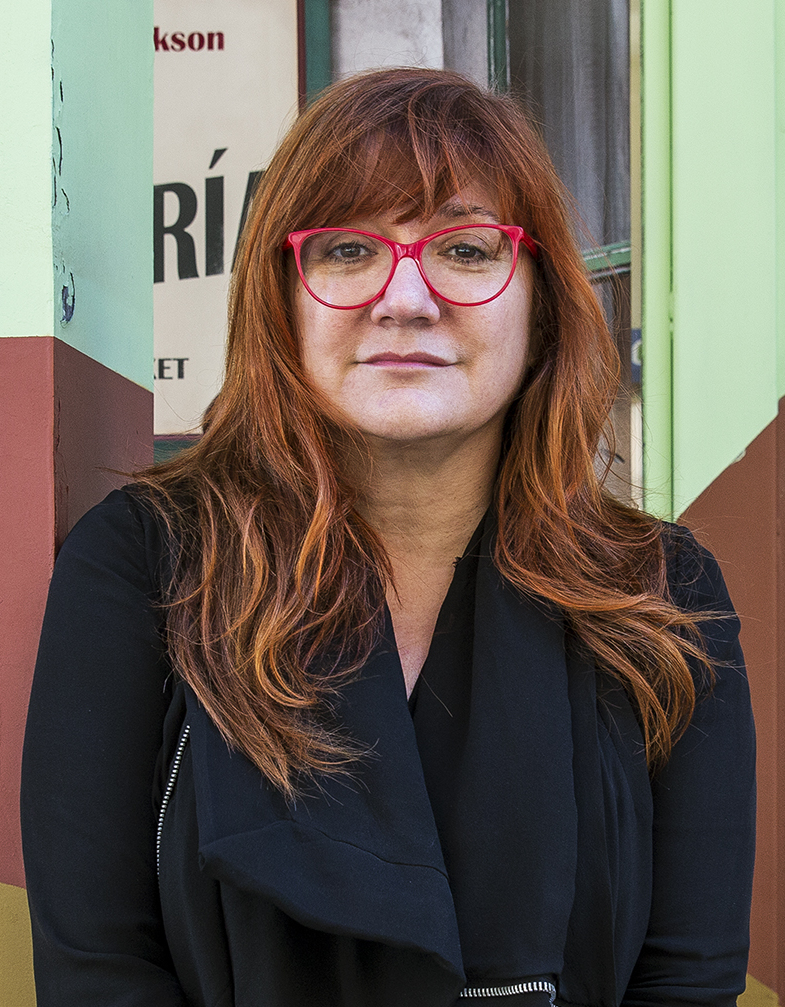
Isabel Coixet, Best Adapted Screenplay co- winner.

The winners and nominees are listed as follows:

Best Film: Creatura; produced by Marta Cruañas, Ariadna Dot, María Zamora, Stefan Schmitz, Tono Folguera, Jake Cheetham, Pau Suris, Oriol Sala-Patau; The Enchanted; produced by Marta Ramírez, Adolfo Blanco, Oriol Sala-Patau; The Permanent Picture; produced by Adrià Monés Murlans, Gabrielle Dumon; Jokes & Cigarettes; produced by Edmon Roch, Jaime Ortiz de Artiñano, Oriol Sala-Patau	Best Non-Catalan Language Film: 20,000 Species of Bees; produced by Lara Izaguirre, Valérie Delpierre; The Teacher Who Promised the Sea; produced by Francesc Escribano, Tono Folguera, David Felani, Laura Fernández Brites, Carlos Fernández; Un amor; produced by Sandra Hermida Múñiz, Marisa Fernández Armenteros; Upon Entry; produced by Carles Torras, Carlos Juárez, Xosé Zapata, Sergio Adrià, Alba Sotorra
Best Director: Elena Martín — Creatura; Isabel Coixet — Un amor; David Trueba — Jokes & Cigarettes; Agustí Villaronga — Stormy Lola	Best New Director: Estibaliz Urresola — 20,000 Species of Bees; Laura Ferrés Moreno — The Permanent Picture; Alejandro Marín — Love & Revolution; Juan Sebastián Vásquez, Alejandro Rojas — Upon Entry
Best Original Screenplay: Juan Sebastián Vásquez, Alejandro Rojas — Upon Entry; Isa Campo, Andrea Queralt, Víctor Iriarte — Foremost by Night; Elena Martín, Clara Roquet — Creatura; Estibaliz Urresola Solaguren — 20,000 Species of Bees	Best Adapted Screenplay: Isabel Coixet, Laura Ferrero — Un amor; Pablo Berger — Robot Dreams; David Trueba, Albert Espinosa — Jokes & Cigarettes; Albert Val — The Teacher Who Promised the Sea
Best Actress: Carolina Yuste — Jokes & Cigarettes as Conchita; Laia Costa — Un amor as Nat; Bruna Cusí — Upon Entry as Elena; Patricia López Arnaiz — 20,000 Species of Bees as Ane	Best Actor: David Verdaguer — Jokes & Cigarettes as Eugenio; Alberto Ammann — Upon Entry as Diego; Enric Auquer — The Teacher Who Promised the Sea as Antoni Benaiges; Oriol Pla — Creatura as Marcel
Best Supporting Actress: Clara Segura — Creatura as Diana; Aina Clotet — The Enchanted as Ingrid; Ane Gabarain — 20,000 Species of Bees as Lourdes; Ana Torrent — Foremost by Night as Cora	Best Supporting Actor: Àlex Brendemühl — Creatura as Gerard; Daniel Brühl — The Movie Teller as Nansen; Pedro Casablanc — Jokes & Cigarettes as Vicente; Hugo Silva — Un amor as Piter
Best New Performance: Clàudia Malagelada — Creatura as Mila; Ainara Elejalde — The Enchanted as Gina; Alícia Falcó — In the Company of Women as Bea; La Dani (Dani F. Pozo) — Love & Revolution as Dani	Best Original Score: Alfonso de Vilallonga — Robot Dreams; Clara Aguilar — Creatura; Maria Arnal, Nora Haddad Casadevall — Alteritats; Andrea Motis — Jokes & Cigarettes
Best Production Supervision: Eduard Vallés — Jokes & Cigarettes; Andrés Mellinas — Creatura; Elisa Sirvent, Patricio Pereira — The Movie Teller; Eva Taboada — Un amor	Best Documentary Film: While You're Still You; produced by Claudia Pinto Emperador, Óscar Bernàcer, Joana M. Ortueta, Jordi Llorca, Iván Martínez Rufat, Pilar Llorca; Alteritats; produced by Andrea Herrera Catalá, Almudena Monzú; Hermano caballo; produced by Adrián Guerra Armas, Núria Valls Villanueva; Muyeres; produced by Oriol Maymó, Núria Domènech
Best Short Film: El bus; produced by Valérie Delpierre, Jaume Fargas Coll; Blow!; produced by Miriam Porté, Neus Ballús; La herida luminosa; produced by Sergi Casamitjana Melich, Lita Roig; Tots els meus colors; produced by Anna Solana	Best TV Movie: Quico Sabaté, sense destí; produced by Albert Solé, Oriol Sala-Patau; Miró; produced by Oriol Marcos, Tiffany Ruoz, Oriol Sala-Patau
Best Animated Film: Robot Dreams; produced by Sandra Tapia, Ibon Cormenzana, Ignasi Estapé, Ángel Durández, Pablo Berger, Jérôme Vidal, Sylvie Pialat, Benoît Quainon; They Shot the Piano Player; produced by Cristina Huete; Hannah and the Monsters; produced by Ángeles Hernández, David Matamoros; Heavies tendres; produced by Juanjo Sáez, Laia Servera	Best Art Direction: Marc Pou — Jokes & Cigarettes; Josep Rosell — The Teacher Who Promised the Sea; Sylvia Steinbrecht — Creatura; Izaskun Urkijo Alijo — 20,000 Species of Bees
Best Cinematography: Gina Ferrer — 20,000 Species of Bees; Alana Mejía González — Creatura; Agnès Piqué Corbera — The Permanent Picture; Bet Rourich — Un amor	Best Editing: Ariadna Ribas — Creatura; Ana Pfaff — Foremost by Night; Bernat Aragonés — The Movie Teller; Raúl Barreras — 20,000 Species of Bees
Best Costume Design: Lala Huete — Jokes & Cigarettes; Maria Armengol — The Teacher Who Promised the Sea; Mercè Paloma — The Movie Teller; Isis Velasco — Love & Revolution	Best Sound: Xavi Mas, Eduardo Castro, Yasmina Praderas — Jokes & Cigarettes; Albert Gay, Enrique G. Bermejo, Carlos Jiménez — Un amor; Eva Valiño, Koldo Corella, Xanti Salvador — 20,000 Species of Bees; Leo Dolgan, Oriol Donat, Laia Casanovas — Creatura
Best Visual Effects: Bernat Aragonés — The Movie Teller; Wesley Barnard, Míriam Piquer — Jokes & Cigarettes; Cristina Garmón — Creatura; David Martí, Montse Ribé — Tobacco Barns	Best Makeup and Hairstyles: Caitlin Acheson, Nacho Díaz, Benjamín Pérez — Jokes & Cigarettes; Danae Gatell, Àlex Salvat — Creatura; Patricia Reyes — The Teacher Who Promised the Sea; Patricia Reyes, Jesús Martos — The Movie Teller
Best European Film: Society of the Snow; Aftersun; Close; Triangle of Sadness; The Eight Mountains

=== Films with multiple nominations and awards ===
Films that received multiple nominations
Nominations	Film
15	Creatura
13	Jokes & Cigarettes
9	20,000 Species of Bees
8	Un amor
6	The Teacher Who Promised the Sea
6	The Movie Teller
5	Upon Entry
3	The Enchanted
3	The Permanent Picture
3	Foremost by Night
3	Love & Revolution
3	Robot Dreams
2	Alteritats

Films that received multiple awards
Awards	Film
6	Creatura
6	Jokes & Cigarettes
3	20,000 Species of Bees
2	Robot Dreams

=== Honorary Gaudí ===
- Rosa Vergés

=== Special Audience Award for Best Film ===
- The Teacher Who Promised the Sea
