= The Enchanted (film) =

- Theatrical release poster
- Catalan: Els encantats
- Directed by: Elena Trapé
- Written by: Elena Trapé; Miguel Ibáñez Monroy
- Produced by: Adolfo Blanco; Marta Ramírez
- Starring: Laia Costa; Dani Pérez Prada; Ainara Elejalde Bel
- Cinematography: Pau Castejón Úbeda
- Edited by: Sofi Escudé Poulenc
- Production companies: Coming Soon Films; A Contracorriente Films; Encantats Films AIE
- Distributed by: A Contracorriente Films
- Release dates: 12 March 2023 (Málaga); 2 June 2023 (Spain)
- Country: Spain
- Language: Catalan

The Enchanted (Catalan: Els encantats) is a 2023 Spanish drama film directed by Elena Trapé which stars Laia Costa alongside Dani Pérez Prada and Ainara Elejalde Bel.

== Plot ==
Upon separating for the first time from her 4-year-old daughter, Irene moves to a family cottage located in a small village of the Catalan Pyrenees, meeting with the likes of grandfather Agustí, young neighbor Gina, and Ingrid, otherwise inviting cosmopolitan friend Erik to the place.

== Cast ==
- Laia Costa as Irene
- Pep Cruz as Agustí
- Aina Clotet as Ingrid
- Daniel Pérez Prada as Erik
- Ainara Elejalde as Gina
- Dèlia Brufau as Marta
- Carlos di Ros as Guillem

== Production ==
The film is a Coming Soon Films, A Contracorriente Films, and Encantats Films AIE production, with participation of RTVE and TVC and backing from ICAA and ICEC. It was shot in Antist (Vall Fosca), in the Pallars Jussà comarca of Catalonia.

== Release ==
The film was presented at the 26th Málaga Film Festival on 12 March 2023. It later screened at the 7th BCN Film Fest. Distributed by A Contracorriente Films, it was released theatrically in Spain on 2 June 2023.

== Reception ==
Jonathan Holland of ScreenDaily deemed the film to be a "a disappointingly inert, overly-schematic drama", with a "wonderful" central performance by Costa, who "can only go so far in giving us access to the largely hermetic Irene".

== Accolades ==
| Year | Award | Category | Nominee(s) | Result | Ref. |
|---|---|---|---|---|---|
| 2023 | 26th Málaga Film Festival | Silver Biznaga for Best Screenplay | Elena Trapé, Miguel Ibáñez Monroy | Won | |
| 2024 | 16th Gaudí Awards | Best Film | | Nominated | |
| 2024 | 16th Gaudí Awards | Best Supporting Actress | Aina Clotet | Nominated | |
| 2024 | 16th Gaudí Awards | Best New Performance | Ainara Elejalde | Nominated | |

== See also ==
- List of Spanish films of 2023
