= Ana Torrent =

Spanish film actress (born 1966)

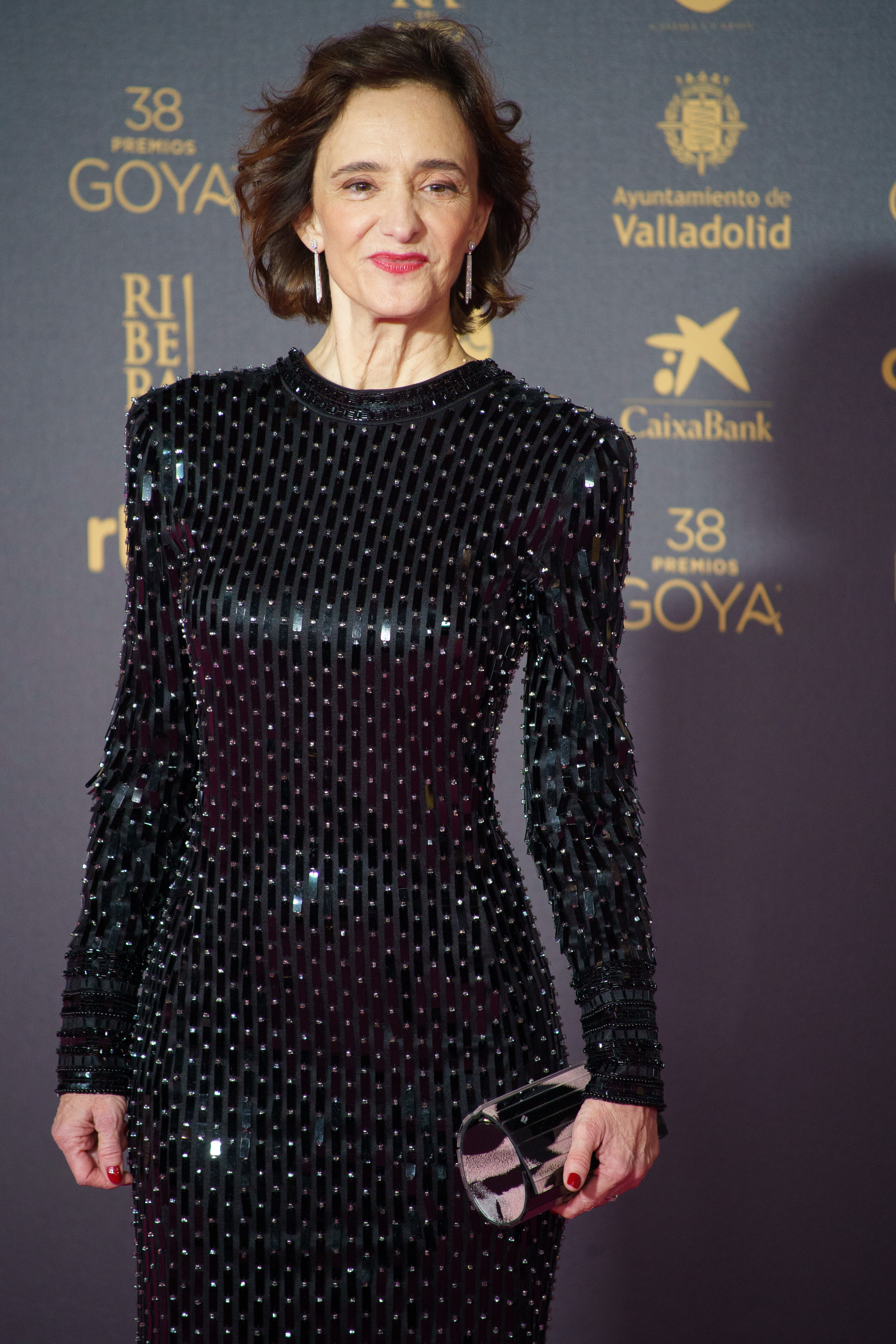
- Torrent in 2024
- Born: Ana Torrent Bertrán de Lis; 12 July 1966 (age 60); Madrid, Spain
- Occupation: Actress
- Years active: 1973–present

Ana Torrent Bertrán de Lis (born 12 July 1966) is a Spanish film actress. She featured as a child actress in pictures such as The Spirit of the Beehive (1973), and Cría cuervos (1976), Elisa, vida mía (1977) and The Nest (1980). Her performance in Thesis (1996) earned her a nomination to the Goya Award for Best Actress.

== Early life and career ==
Ana Torrent was born on 12 July 1966 in Madrid to an upper-class family. Her debut came in 1973 with the starring role as "Ana" in the film El espíritu de la colmena (The Spirit of the Beehive), directed by Víctor Erice, when she was seven years old. In reference to her recruitment for this first film, Torrent stated:

"I remember meeting Victor for the first time. He was standing around during recess at my school, taking pictures of me and other girls. He was traveling around many schools to find a young girl to cast. I remember telling my parents that some man is taking pictures of me at school. Then they called on me one day while I was in class and mentioned the movie. I also remember some things from the shoot: the atmosphere, the sounds, the lights. It wasn't a difficult process because it wasn't acting. I never considered myself an actress. I was just playing myself, a child, and they gave me instructions. I remember my character in the film was even supposed to have a different name, but at that age, I didn't understand why they weren't calling me my name, so Victor changed it to Anna. I wasn't conscious of acting at all, and I didn't understand what I was doing. It was just like a big mysterious game."

After The Spirit of the Beehive, she played a character with the same name in Cría Cuervos (Raise Ravens) (1976) by director Carlos Saura. Despite her success in film as a young child, she later recounted how it was not until her teens that she began to consider herself to really be an actress:

"It was much later. My role in The Spirit of the Beehive was a coincidence. I would have never chosen to be an actress myself. And my family had nothing to do with the film world. I was a shy and reserved person. I wasn't like the other kids that wanted to perform in the theatre. I began to understand what acting was, and I began to enjoy it when I was 17 or 18. Again it was thanks to Victor. We kept in touch after The Spirit of the Beehive, and when I was around 16, we were speaking, and he asked me what I wanted to do career-wise. I wasn't sure, and he asked if I thought about acting and recommended I take some acting classes. I began classes around 17, and that's when I knew I wanted to do this for a living."

In 1989, Torrent performed with Sharon Stone in the film Blood and Sand directed by Javier Elorrieta. In 1996, Torrent received numerous awards and nominations, including a Goya Award nomination for her lead actress role in Alejandro Amenábar's film Tesis (Thesis). By the end of the 1990s, she received critical acclaim when she played a Basque nationalist murdered for quitting ETA, in the film Yoyes (2000) directed by Helena Taberna. In 2008, Torrent portrayed Catherine of Aragon in the film The Other Boleyn Girl (2008), starring alongside Natalie Portman and Scarlett Johansson.

More recently, she rejoined Erice to star in the film Close Your Eyes. It premiered at the 2023 Cannes Film Festival, marking Torrent's return to Cannes after the presentation of Cría cuervos in 1976. In the film, she portrayed Ana Arenas, the daughter of long-disappeared actor Julio Arenas. Also in 2023, she starred in Foremost by Night, which debuted in the Venice Days. She portrayed Cora, a woman unable to bear biological children.

In March 2025, she debuted in the play The Bitter Tears of Petra Von Kant (a Rakel Camacho's adaptation of Rainer Werner Fassbinder's play) at Nave 10 Matadero.

== Filmography ==
Year	Film	Role	Notes	Ref.
1973	El espíritu de la colmena	Ana		
1976	Cría cuervos	Ana		
1977	Elisa, vida mía	Niña Elisa		
1979	Ogro	Niña vasca		
1980	El nido (The Nest)	Goyita		
1985	Los paraísos perdidos (The Lost Paradise)	Andrea		
1989	Sangre y arena	Carmen Espinosa		
1992	Vacas	Catalina		
1992	Amor e Dedinhos de Pé	Victorina Vidal		
1994	Entre rojas	La Tacatún		
1995	Puede ser divertido	Carmen		
1995	El palomo cojo (The Lame Pigeon)	Adoración		
1996	Tesis (Thesis)	Ángela		
1998	El grito en el cielo (Shoot Out)	Yoli		
1999	Ave María	Adelina		
2000	Yoyes	Yoyes		
2001	Sagitario	Luisa		
2001	Juego de Luna (Luna's Game)	Luna	Younger versions of the character played by Dafne Fernández and Gara Muñoz	
2003	Una preciosa puesta de sol	Elena		
2004	Iris	Magdalena		
2008	14, Fabian Road	Vega Galindo		
2008	The Other Boleyn Girl	Catherine of Aragon		
2009	NO-DO (The Haunting)	Francesca		
2011	There Be Dragons	Doña Dolores		
2017	Verónica (Veronica)	Ana		
2020	It Snows in Benidorm	Lucía		
2023	Cerrar los ojos (Close Your Eyes)	Ana Arenas		
2023	Sobre todo de noche (Foremost by Night)	Cora		
2025	La furia (Fury)	Directora teatral de Medea ('stage director of Medea')		

== Accolades ==
Year	Award	Category	Work	Result	Ref.
1997	11th Goya Awards	Best Actress	Thesis	Nominated	
2024	11th Feroz Awards	Best Supporting Actress in a Film	Close Your Eyes	Nominated	
2024	16th Gaudí Awards	Best Supporting Actress	Close Your Eyes	Nominated	
2024	79th CEC Medals	Best Supporting Actress	Close Your Eyes	Won	
2024	38th Goya Awards	Best Supporting Actress	Close Your Eyes	Nominated	
2024	11th Platino Awards	Best Supporting Actress	Close Your Eyes	Nominated	
