= The Movie Teller =

- Theatrical release poster
- Spanish: La contadora de películas
- Directed by: Lone Scherfig
- Screenplay by: Rafa Russo; Walter Salles; Isabel Coixet
- Based on: La contadora de películas by Hernán Rivera Letelier
- Produced by: Adolfo Blanco; Manuel Monzón; Vincent Juillerat; Andrés Mardones
- Starring: Bérénice Bejo; Antonio de la Torre; Daniel Brühl; Sara Becker; Alondra Valenzuela
- Cinematography: Daniel Aranyó
- Music by: Fernando Velázquez
- Production companies: A Contracorriente Films; Selenium Films; Altiro Films; Contadora Films AIE
- Distributed by: A Contracorriente Films
- Release dates: 15 September 2023 (TIFF); 27 October 2023 (Spain); 7 November 2024 (Chile)
- Running time: 116 minutes
- Countries: Chile; Spain; France
- Language: Spanish
- Box office: $292,840

The Movie Teller (Spanish: La contadora de películas) is a 2023 comedy-drama film directed by Lone Scherfig from a screenplay by Walter Salles, Rafa Russo, and Isabel Coixet based on the novel by Hernán Rivera Letelier. It stars Bérénice Bejo, Antonio de la Torre, Daniel Brühl, Sara Becker, and Alondra Valenzuela. It is a Chilean-Spanish-French international co-production, and follows a story where a girl's gift for recounting the events in Hollywood movies transforms her family's fortunes in rural 1960s Chile.

== Plot ==
Set in a mining town in the desert of Atacama in the 1960s, against the backdrop of political change in Chile and the decadence of salpetre mining communities in the country, the plot tracks the plight of María Margarita, a young woman possessing the gift of telling movies, who thereby becomes the resident "movie teller".

== Cast ==
- Bérénice Bejo as María Magnolia
- Daniel Brühl as Hauser
- Sara Becker as María Margarita
- Antonio de la Torre as Medardo
- Alondra Valenzuela as María Margarita
- Mario Horton
- Pablo Schwarz

== Production ==
Walter Salles was the driving force behind the project, with an involvement of more than 10 years. The film is an A Contracorriente Films (Adolfo Blanco and Manuel Monzón), Selenium Films (Vincent Juillerat), Altiro Films (Andrés Mardones) and Contadora Films AIE Spanish-French-Chilean co-production, with the participation of RTVE, TVC, and Euskaltel-Telecable and backing from ICAA, ICEC, and Crea-SGR.

== Release ==
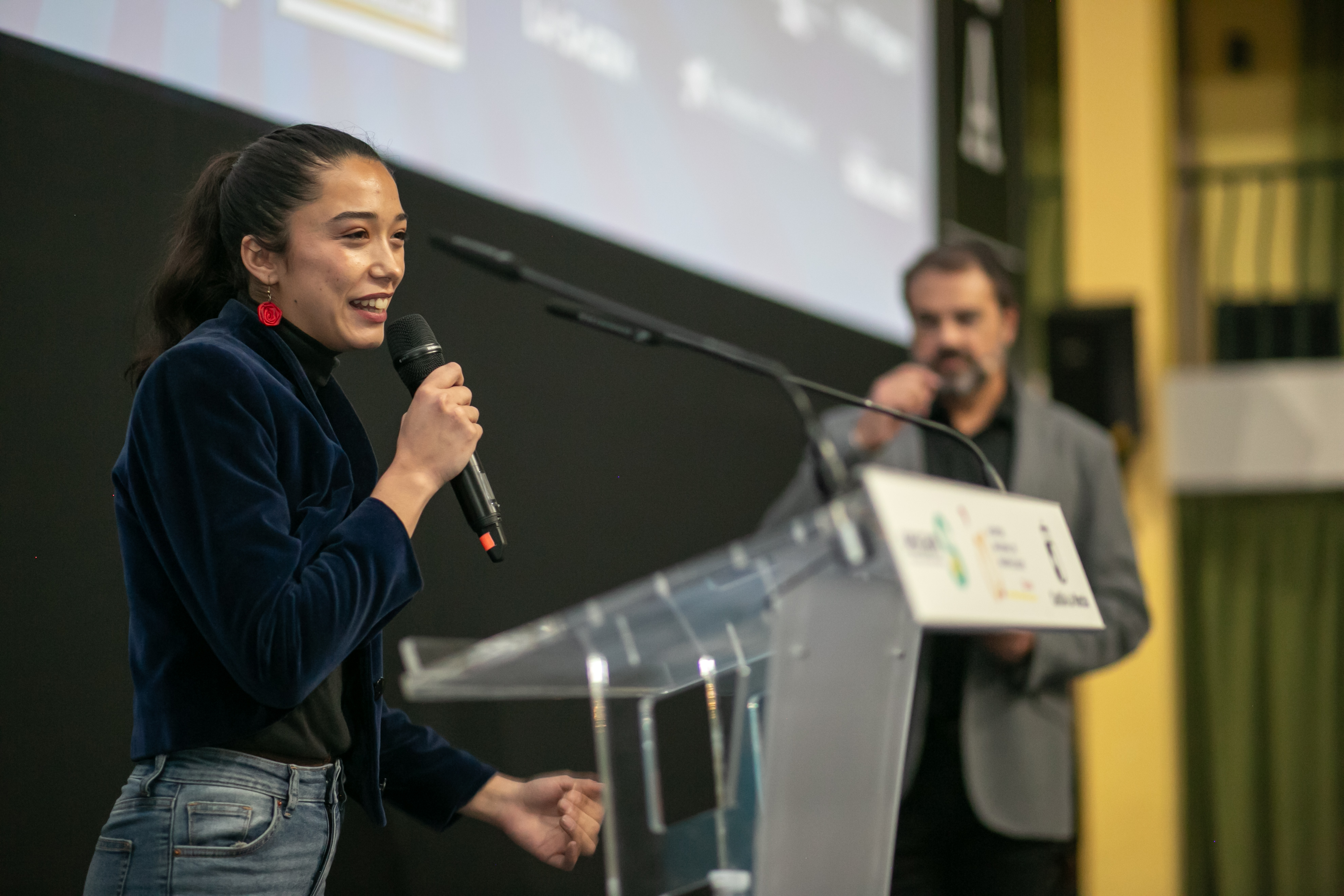
Sara Becker attending a screening of the film at the Hospital Nacional de Parapléjicos in Toledo on 23 October 2023

The film was scheduled to land a special presentation at the 48th Toronto International Film Festival on 15 September 2023, and opened the 68th Valladolid International Film Festival on 21 October 2023. Distributed by A Contracorriente Films, it was released theatrically in Spain on 27 October 2023. Its Chilean theatrical bow by Cinépolis was scheduled for 7 November 2024.

== Reception ==
According to the review aggregation website Rotten Tomatoes, The Movie Teller has a 85% approval rating based on 13 reviews from critics, with an average rating of 6.6/10.

Steve Pond of The Wrap wrote that "in its happiest moments", the film "is glorious and yes, a little corny; in its darkest ones, it's still lovely and sad".

Pete Hammond of Deadline Hollywood deemed the film to be "a must-see" for movie lovers everywhere.

Maggie Lovitt of Collider gave the film a B+ rating, deeming it to be "a love letter to the community that grows from the seeds of storytelling".

== Accolades ==
Year	Award	Category	Nominee(s)	Result	Ref.
2024	16th Gaudí Awards	Best Supporting Actor	Daniel Brühl	Nominated	
2024	16th Gaudí Awards	Best Editing	Bernat Aragonés	Nominated	
2024	16th Gaudí Awards	Best Production Supervision	Elisa Sirvent, Patricio Pereira	Nominated	
2024	16th Gaudí Awards	Best Costume Design	Mercè Paloma	Nominated	
2024	16th Gaudí Awards	Best Makeup and Hairstyles	Patricia Reyes, Jesús Martos	Nominated	
2024	16th Gaudí Awards	Best Visual Effects	Bernat Aragonés	Won	
2024	79th CEC Medals	Best New Actress	Sara Becker	Nominated	
2024	79th CEC Medals	Best Original Score	Fernando Velázquez	Nominated	
2024	38th Goya Awards	Best New Actress	Sara Becker	Nominated	
2024	38th Goya Awards	Best Art Direction	Carlos Conti	Nominated	
2024	38th Goya Awards	Best Costume Design	Mercè Paloma	Nominated	

== See also ==
- List of Spanish films of 2023
