= Un amor =

- Film poster
- Directed by: Isabel Coixet
- Screenplay by: Isabel Coixet; Laura Ferrero
- Based on: Un amor by Sara Mesa
- Produced by: Marisa Fernández Armenteros; Sandra Hermida; Belén Atienza
- Starring: Laia Costa; Hovik Keuchkerian; Luis Bermejo; Hugo Silva; Ingrid García-Jonsson; Francesco Carril
- Cinematography: Bet Rourich
- Edited by: Jordi Azategui
- Production companies: Buena Pinta Media; Perdición Films; Monte Glauco AIE
- Distributed by: BTeam Pictures
- Release dates: 26 September 2023 (Zinemaldia); 10 November 2023 (Spain)
- Running time: 127 minutes
- Country: Spain
- Language: Spanish

Un amor (transl. 'One Love') is a 2023 Spanish drama film directed by Isabel Coixet from a screenplay by Coixet and Laura Ferrero based on the novel of the same name by Sara Mesa. It stars Laia Costa and Hovik Keuchkerian.

== Plot ==
Freelance translator Nat settles in the countryside village of La Escapa, finding a hostile environment and a cruel landlord keen on sexist microagressions. Neighbor Andreas, locally dubbed as "the German", awkwardly offers Nat free home repairs in exchange for sexual penetration. Nat, despite early reluctance, ends up accepting, paving the way for a self-consuming passion.

== Cast ==
- Laia Costa as Nat
- Hovik Keuchkerian as Andreas
- Hugo Silva as Piter
- Luis Bermejo
- Ingrid García-Jonsson as Lara
- Francesco Carril as Carlos

== Production ==
Penned by Isabel Coixet and Laura Ferrero, the screenplay is an adaptation of the 2020 novel Un amor by Sara Mesa. The film was produced by Buena Pinta Media, Perdición Films and Monte Glauco AIE with the participation of RTVE, TV3, Movistar Plus+, ICAA, and Gobierno de La Rioja. Shooting locations in La Rioja included Nalda, Ribafrecha, and Villalobar.

== Release ==
Un amor was presented in the official selection of the 71st San Sebastián International Film Festival on 26 September 2023, in competition for the Golden Shell. Distributed by BTeam Pictures, the film released theatrically in Spain on 10 November 2023.

== Reception ==
Jonathan Holland of ScreenDaily wrote that the film is sometimes "redolent of Coixet's very best work, rippling outwards to touch upon some fundamental, and eternally gripping, human questions about what love is".

Guy Lodge of Variety considered the film to be a return to form for Coixet while pointing out that it is not an "obvious crowdpleasing fare", because of its "commendably complex" gender politics and its "both frank and occasionally disturbing" study of sex as social currency.

=== Top ten lists ===
The film appeared on a number of critics' top ten lists of the best Spanish films of 2023:

- 2nd — El Español (Series & Más consensus)
- 10th — Mondosonoro (consensus)

=== Accolades ===
Award	Date	Category	Recipient	Result	Ref.
San Sebastián International Film Festival	30 September 2023	Golden Shell	Un amor	Nominated	
San Sebastián International Film Festival	30 September 2023	Silver Shell for Best Supporting Performance	Hovik Keuchkerian	Won	
San Sebastián International Film Festival	30 September 2023	Feroz Zinemaldia Award	Un amor	Won	
Forqué Awards	16 December 2023	Best Actor in a Film	Hovik Keuchkerian	Nominated	
Forqué Awards	16 December 2023	Best Actress in a Film	Laia Costa	Nominated	
Feroz Awards	26 January 2024	Best Drama Film	Un amor	Nominated	
Feroz Awards	26 January 2024	Best Director	Isabel Coixet	Nominated	
Feroz Awards	26 January 2024	Best Screenplay	Isabel Coixet & Laura Ferrero	Nominated	
Feroz Awards	26 January 2024	Best Actress in a Film	Laia Costa	Nominated	
Feroz Awards	26 January 2024	Best Actor in a Film	Hovik Keuchkerian	Nominated	
Feroz Awards	26 January 2024	Best Supporting Actor in a Film	Luis Bermejo	Nominated	
Feroz Awards	26 January 2024	Best Supporting Actor in a Film	Hugo Silva	Nominated	
Carmen Awards	3 February 2024	Best Non-Andalusian Produced Film	Un amor	Nominated	
Gaudí Awards	4 February 2024	Best Non-Catalan Language Film	Un amor	Nominated	
Gaudí Awards	4 February 2024	Best Director	Isabel Coixet	Nominated	
Gaudí Awards	4 February 2024	Best Adapted Screenplay	Isabel Coixet, Laura Ferrero	Won	
Gaudí Awards	4 February 2024	Best Actress	Laia Costa	Nominated	
Gaudí Awards	4 February 2024	Best Supporting Actor	Hugo Silva	Nominated	
Gaudí Awards	4 February 2024	Best Cinematography	Bet Rourich	Nominated	
Gaudí Awards	4 February 2024	Best Production Supervision	Eva Taboada	Nominated	
Gaudí Awards	4 February 2024	Best Sound	Albert Gay, Enrique G. Bermejo, Carlos Jiménez	Nominated	
Goya Awards	10 February 2024	Best Film	Un amor	Nominated	
Goya Awards	10 February 2024	Best Director	Isabel Coixet	Nominated	
Goya Awards	10 February 2024	Best Adapted Screenplay	Isabel Coixet, Laura Ferrero	Nominated	
Goya Awards	10 February 2024	Best Cinematography	Bet Rourich	Nominated	
Goya Awards	10 February 2024	Best Actress	Laia Costa	Nominated	
Goya Awards	10 February 2024	Best Actor	Hovik Keuchkerian	Nominated	
Goya Awards	10 February 2024	Best Supporting Actor	Hugo Silva	Nominated	
Actors and Actresses Union Awards	11 March 2024	Best Film Actress in a Leading Role	Laia Costa	Nominated	
Actors and Actresses Union Awards	11 March 2024	Best Film Actor in a Secondary Role	Hugo Silva	Nominated	
Actors and Actresses Union Awards	11 March 2024	Best Film Actor in a Minor Role	Luis Bermejo	Nominated	
Actors and Actresses Union Awards	11 March 2024	Best Film Actress in a Minor Role	Ingrid García-Jonsson	Nominated	
Platino Awards	20 April 2024	Best Director	Isabel Coixet	Nominated	
Platino Awards	20 April 2024	Best Actress	Laia Costa	Won	
Platino Awards	20 April 2024	Best Supporting Actor	Luis Bermejo	Nominated	

== See also ==
- List of Spanish films of 2023
