= Foremost by Night =

- Theatrical release poster
- Spanish: Sobre todo de noche
- Directed by: Víctor Iriarte
- Screenplay by: Víctor Iriarte; Isa Campo; Andrea Queralt
- Starring: Lola Dueñas; Ana Torrent; Manuel Egozkue
- Cinematography: Pablo Paloma
- Edited by: Ana Pfaff
- Production companies: Atekaleun; CSC Films; La Termita Films; Ukbar Filmes; 4A4 Productions
- Distributed by: Atalante (es); Shellac (fr)
- Release dates: 2 September 2023 (Venice); 1 December 2023 (Spain); 17 July 2024 (France)
- Countries: Spain; Portugal; France

Foremost by Night (Spanish: Sobre todo de noche) is a 2023 neo-noir melodrama film directed by Víctor Iriarte (in his feature film debut) which stars Lola Dueñas and Ana Torrent alongside Manuel Egozkue. It is a Spanish-Portuguese-French international co-production.

== Plot ==
Exploring the issue of stolen children in Spain, the plot tracks Vera's search for her biological son, given in adoption, thereby coming across Cora and her adoptive son Egoz.

== Cast ==
- Lola Dueñas as Vera
- Ana Torrent as Cora
- Manuel Egozkue as Egoz
- María Vázquez as bibliotecaria ('librarian')
- Katia Borlado
- Lina Rodrigues

== Production ==
The screenplay was penned by Víctor Iriarte, Isa Campo, and Andrea Queralt. The film was known in early development stages under the provisional title Reescritura. A Spanish-Portuguese-French venture, the film was produced by Atekaleun, CSC Films and La Termita Films alongside Ukbar Filmes and 4A4 Productions, and it had the participation of TVE and TVC and backing from ICAA, the Basque Government, and the Foral Deputation of Gipuzkoa. Shooting locations included the Basque Country, Madrid, Paris, and Portugal.

== Release ==
The film made it to the 'Venice Days' independent slate of the 80th Venice Film Festival, where it was presented on 2 September 2023. It was also selected for screenings in the 'New Directors' competitive section of the 58th Chicago International Film Festival and the main competition section of the 68th Valladolid International Film Festival. Distributed by Atalante, the film was released theatrically in Spain on 1 December 2023. It was released theatrically in France by Shellac on 17 July 2024 under the title Dos Madres.

== Reception ==
According to the review aggregation website Rotten Tomatoes, Foremost by Night has a 100% approval rating based on 9 reviews from critics, with an average rating of 7.8/10.

Jonathan Holland of ScreenDaily deemed the film to be a "admirable, well-crafted feature debut" for Iriarte, yet otherwise remarkably lacking in "the human dimension, the emotional undertow".

Paula Arantzazu Ruiz of Cinemanía rated the film 4 out of 5 stars, deeming it to be a "stimulating, unpredictable, sensitive, painful and hopeful" exercise in which both Dueñas and Torrent shine.

=== Top ten lists ===
The film appeared on a number of critics' top ten lists of the best Spanish films of 2023:

- 1st — El Periódico de Catalunya (critics)
- 1st — El Confidencial (consensus)

== Accolades ==
Year	Award	Category	Nominee(s)	Result	Ref.
2024	11th Feroz Awards	'Arrebato' Special Award (Fiction)		Won	
2024	16th Gaudí Awards	Best Original Screenplay	Isa Campo, Andrea Queralt, Víctor Iriarte	Nominated	
2024	16th Gaudí Awards	Best Supporting Actress	Ana Torrent	Nominated	
2024	16th Gaudí Awards	Best Editing	Ana Pfaff	Nominated	

== See also ==
- List of Spanish films of 2023
- List of French films of 2024
