= Creatura =

2023 catalan film

- Theatrical release poster
- Directed by: Elena Martín Gimeno
- Screenplay by: Elena Martín Gimeno; Clara Roquet
- Produced by: Ariadna Dot; Marta Cruañas; Tono Folguera; María Zamora; Stefan Schmitz; Pau Surís; Jake Cheetham
- Starring: Elena Martín Gimeno; Clàudia Malagelada; Mila Borràs; Oriol Pla; Clara Segura; Carla Linares; Marc Cartanyà; Àlex Brendemühl
- Cinematography: Alana Mejía González
- Edited by: Ariadna Ribas
- Music by: Clara Aguilar
- Production companies: Vilaüt Films; Lastor Media; Elastica Films; Avalon PC
- Distributed by: Avalon
- Release dates: 20 May 2023 (Cannes); 8 September 2023 (Spain)
- Country: Spain
- Language: Catalan

Creatura is a 2023 Spanish drama film in the Catalan language, directed and co-written by Elena Martín Gimeno, who also plays the leading role of Mila.

== Plot ==
Upon moving in to a family summer house on the coastline of Maresme with her boyfriend, Marcel, Mila wrestles with sexual trauma, with flashbacks to her earliest moments of sexual awareness (at 5 years old) and her teenage years (15 years old).

== Cast ==
- Elena Martín Gimeno as Mila
- Clàudia Malagelada as Mila
- Mila Borràs as Mila
- Oriol Pla as Marcel
- Alex Brendemühl as Gerard
- Clara Segura as Diana
- Marc Cartanyà as Gerard
- Carla Linares as Diana

== Production ==
The film was produced by Vilaüt Films, Lastor Media, Avalon PC, and Elastica Films. It was produced in association with Suris/Bishop Film, and it had the participation of TV3 and Filmin and backing from ICAA, ICEC and Creative Media Europe. It was shot in Catalan. Shooting locations in Catalonia included Sant Vicenç de Montalt, L'Escala, Blanes, Barcelona, and Sitges.

== Release ==
The film world premiered in the Directors' Fortnight section of the 76th Cannes Film Festival on 20 May 2023. Distributed by Avalon, it was released theatrically in Spain on 8 September 2023.

== Reception ==
The review aggregator website Rotten Tomatoes reported an approval rating of 93% based on 14 reviews from critics.

Nikki Baughan of ScreenDaily considered that the film, an exploration of the "close relationship between guilt, shame and desire" should "attract attention for its female-centric story and strong visual identity".

Dustin Chang of ScreenAnarchy deemed Creatura to be "an interesting film about how the female sexuality frightens men".

Carlota Moseguí of Cinemanía rated the film 4 out of 5 stars, underscoring it to be "a strong claim on the exposure of female desire" in the verdict.

=== Top ten lists ===
The film appeared on a number of critics' top ten lists of the best Spanish films of 2023:

- 2nd — El Confidencial (consensus)
- 3rd — El Periódico de Catalunya (critics)
- 4th — El Cultural (critics)
- 5th — Mondosonoro (consensus)
- 5th — El Mundo (Luis Martínez)
- 6th — El Español (Series & Más consensus)

=== Accolades ===
Award	Date	Category	Recipient	Result	Ref.
Cannes Film Festival	27 May 2023	Europa Cinemas Label Prize for Best European Film (Directors' Fortnight)	Elena Martín	Won	
San Sebastián International Film Festival	30 September 2023	Dunia Ayaso Award	Creatura	Won	
Brussels Mediterranean Film Festival	8 December 2023	Prix Les Grenades	Creatura	Won	
Brussels Mediterranean Film Festival	8 December 2023	Prix de la critique UPCB-UCC	Creatura	Won	
Feroz Awards	26 January 2024	Best Director	Elena Martín Gimeno	Nominated	
Feroz Awards	26 January 2024	Best Screenplay	Elena Martín Gimeno, Clara Roquet	Nominated	
Feroz Awards	26 January 2024	Best Supporting Actor	Oriol Pla	Nominated	
Gaudí Awards	4 February 2024	Best Film	Creatura	Won	
Gaudí Awards	4 February 2024	Best Director	Elena Martín	Won	
Gaudí Awards	4 February 2024	Best Original Screenplay	Elena Martín, Clara Roquet	Nominated	
Gaudí Awards	4 February 2024	Best Actor	Oriol Pla	Nominated	
Gaudí Awards	4 February 2024	Best Supporting Actress	Clara Segura	Won	
Gaudí Awards	4 February 2024	Best Supporting Actor	Àlex Brendemühl	Won	
Gaudí Awards	4 February 2024	Best New Performance	Clàudia Malagelada	Won	
Gaudí Awards	4 February 2024	Best Cinematography	Alana Mejía González	Nominated	
Gaudí Awards	4 February 2024	Best Editing	Ariadna Ribas	Won	
Gaudí Awards	4 February 2024	Best Original Score	Clara Aguilar	Nominated	
Gaudí Awards	4 February 2024	Best Art Direction	Sylvia Steinbrecht	Nominated	
Gaudí Awards	4 February 2024	Best Production Supervision	Andrés Mellinas	Nominated	
Gaudí Awards	4 February 2024	Best Sound	Leo Dolgan, Oriol Donat, Laia Casanovas	Nominated	
Gaudí Awards	4 February 2024	Best Visual Effects	Cristina Garmón	Nominated	
Gaudí Awards	4 February 2024	Best Makeup and Hairstyles	Danae Gatell, Àlex Salvat	Nominated	
Goya Awards	10 February 2024	Best Director	Elena Martín	Nominated	
Goya Awards	10 February 2024	Best Supporting Actress	Clara Segura	Nominated	
Goya Awards	10 February 2024	Best Supporting Actor	Alex Brendemühl	Nominated	
Goya Awards	10 February 2024	Best New Actress	Clàudia Malagelada	Nominated	
Actors and Actresses Union Awards	12 March 2024	Best Film Actor in a Secondary Role	Àlex Brendemühl	Won	

== See also ==
- List of Spanish films of 2023
