= Ana Polo =

Spanish journalist (born 1990)

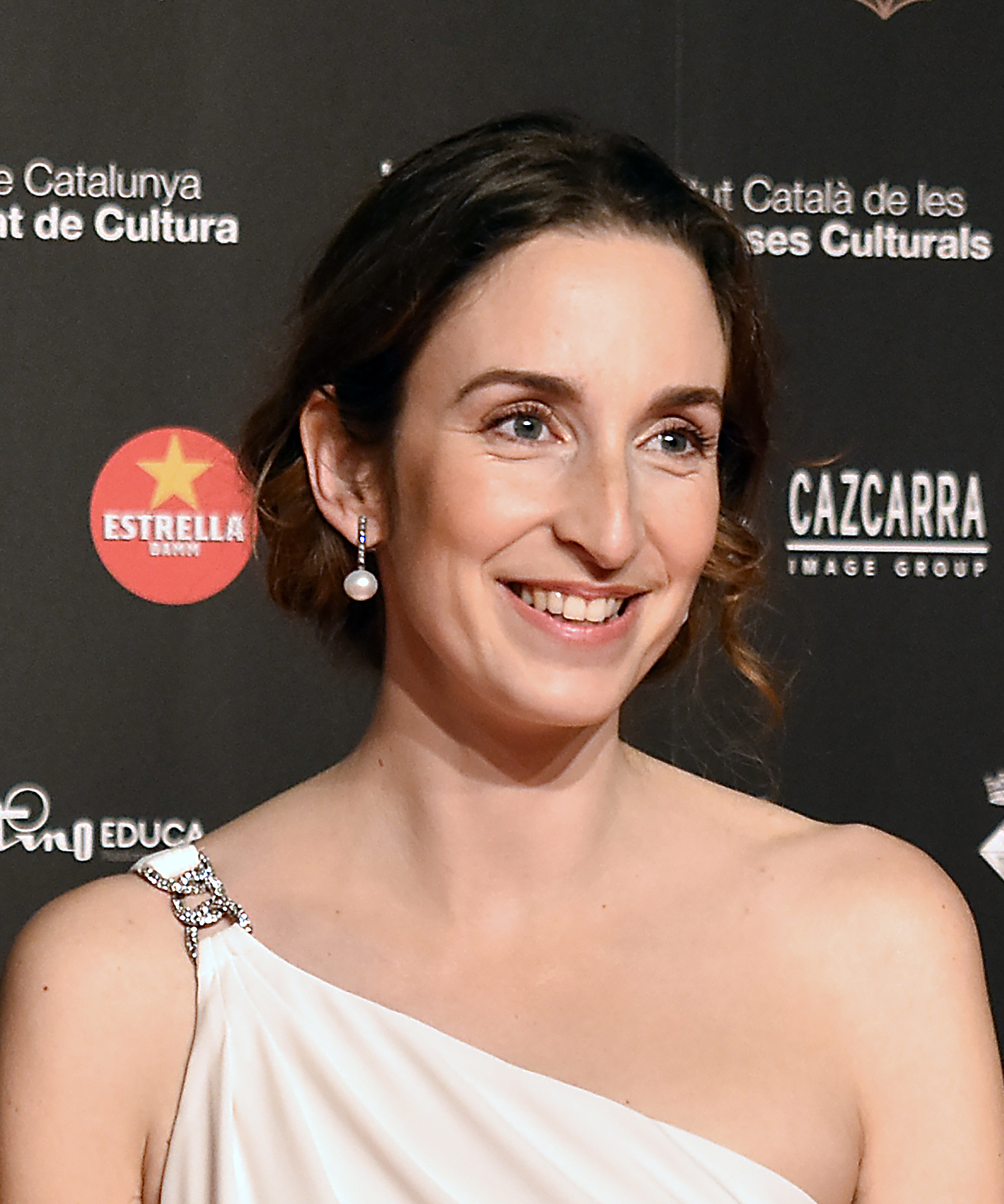
- Polo in 2022
- Born: Ana Polo Gutiérrez; 1990 (age 35–36); Vilassar de Mar, Catalonia, Spain
- Occupations: Journalist, humorist, writer

Ana Polo Gutiérrez (born 1990) is a Spanish journalist, humorist and writer.

== Biography ==
Polo has a degree in journalism and performed her practices in the news radio channel RAC 1. She has regularly collaborated in media such as RAC 1 (in the progran La Segona hora), also in Catalunya Ràdio, on Televisión Española (in the program Tips) and in 8TV (in the program Catalunya Directe). Disillusioned the great media, where she considered that her role was often restricted to being "the girl of the program", Polo opted for other formats and platforms where women had greater creative freedom and could act as producers.

Polo is known for her feminist monologues, which she has done throughout Catalonia since the late 2010. She usually works with the humorist Oye Sherman, and from 2020 together they've presented the podcast Oye Polo on Radio Primavera Sound, one of the most listened programs in Catalan in 2021.

In 2020, Polo launched the program Feministic on the Fibracat TV television channel, a capsules space on feminist dissemination. 40 chapters were made, until the platform closed at the end of 2022. Also in 2022, the editorial La Galera proposed that Polo write her first book, entitled Mi primera guía feminista, illustrated by Eva Palomar. Thought as a brief introduction to feminism for children from 10 years, this book seeks to cover the void left by existing editorials of non-fiction feminist books for children. It is available in Catalan and Spanish.

== Personal life ==
Polo is openly lesbian.

== Bibliography ==
- 2022 – Mi primera guía feminista. Illustrated by Eva Palomar. La Galera. ISBN 9788424671662.
