= 68th Valladolid International Film Festival =

2023 film festival

- Official poster of the 68th Seminci by Toni Pontí
- Opening film: The Movie Teller
- Location: Valladolid, Castile and León, Spain
- Awards: Golden Spike: The Permanent Picture
- Directors: José Luis Cienfuegos
- Festival date: 21–28 October 2023

Valladolid International Film Festival
- 69th 67th

The 68th Valladolid International Film Festival (Seminci) took place from 21 to 28 October 2023, in Valladolid, Spain. The Movie Teller, an adaptation of Hernán Rivera Letelier's novel, directed by Lone Scherfig, opened the festival.

== Background ==
The festival was directed by José Luis Cienfuegos for the first time, taking over after Javier Angulo, who served as the festival's director from 2009 to 2022. Cienfuegos had previously taken the same role for the Seville European Film Festival and the Gijón International Film Festival.

A new competitive section named Alquimias was introduced, destined to "welcome stories set in distant latitudes, tales that define a time and a place, while portraying the passions inherent in the human condition and highlighting the possibilities of cinema as a shared mirror of world events". A €10,000 award will be presented to the winner, sponsored by Grupo Recoletas Red Hospitalaria.

Later in October, actresses Charlotte Rampling, Nathalie Baye, and Kiti Mánver were announced as the recipients of Honorary Spikes. Actress Blanca Portillo and the European Film Academy completed the set of recipients of Honorary Spikes. Meritxell Colell, Mike Goodridge, Pan Nalin, Jara Yáñez, and Iván Granovsky were announced as jury members of the official selection.

== Sections ==
The films selected for each section are as follows:

=== Official competition ===
The following films were selected to compete for the Golden Spike:

Feature-Length Films

English title	Original title	Director(s)	Production countrie(s)
All of Us Strangers		Andrew Haigh	United Kingdom
Andrea's Love	El amor de Andrea	Manuel Martín Cuenca	Spain, Mexico
Kidnapped	Rapito	Marco Bellocchio	Italy, France, Germany
The Old Oak		Ken Loach	United Kingdom, France, Belgium
Green Border	Zielona granica	Agnieszka Holland	Poland, United States, France, Czequia, Belgium
How to Have Sex		Molly Manning Walker	United Kingdom, Greece, Belgium
The Permanent Picture	La imatge permanent	Laura Ferrés	Spain, France
La chimera		Alice Rohrwacher	Italy, France, Switzerland
Four Daughters	بنات ألفة / Les Filles d'Olfa	Kaouther Ben Hania	Tunisia, France, Germany, Saudi Arabia
Music		Angela Schanelec	Germany, France, Serbia
Something Is About to Happen	Que nadie duerma	Antonio Méndez Esparza	Spain, Romania
The Teachers' Lounge	Das Lehrerzimmer	İlker Çatak	Germany
Samsara		Lois Patiño	Spain
Foremost by Night	Sobre todo de noche	Víctor Iriarte	Spain, France, Portugal
The Beast	La Bête	Bertrand Bonello	France, Canada
The Shadowless Tower	白塔之光	Zhang Lü	China
The Sweet East		Sean Price Williams	United States
Out of Competition
Cristina García Rodero - La Mirada Oculta		Carlota Nelson	Spain
Dear Jassi		Tarsem Singh Dhandwar	India
The Teacher Who Promised the Sea	El maestro que prometió el mar	Patricia Font	Spain
The Movie Teller (opening film)	La contadora de películas	Lone Scherfig	Spain, France, Chile
Mamacruz		Patricia Ortega	Spain, Venezuela
Teresa		Paula Ortiz	Spain
Special Screenings
Blue Giant		Yuzuru Tachikawa	Japan
Concierto Plena Pausa		Iván Zulueta	Spain
Sultana's Dream	El sueño de la sultana	Isabel Herguera	Spain, Germany
In Praise of the Horizon	Elogio del horizonte	Rafa Alberola	Spain
Juniper		Matthew J. Saville	New Zealand
The Green Room	La Chambre verte	François Truffaut	France
The Night My Dad Saved Christmas	La navidad en sus manos	Joaquín Mazón	Spain, Mexico
Memento Mori		Marco A. Castillo, Fran Parra	Spain, Portugal
No, I Don't Want To	No, No Quiero	Belén Santos	Spain
Seed of the Son	Semilla del son	JuanMa V. Betancourt	Spain
The Kid Brother		Ted Wilde, J.A. Howe	United States

Highlighted title indicates Golden Spike winner.
Short Films

English title	Original title	Director(s)	Production countrie(s)
27		Flóra Anna Buda	France, Hungary
Aitana		Marina Alberti	Spain
Ardent Other	Le mal des ardents	Alice Brygo	France
Crocodile	Krokodyl	Dawid Bodzak	Poland
Eeva		Morten Tšinakov, Lucija Mrzljak, Lucija Mrzljak	Croatia, Estonia
Howling	遠吠え	Aya Kawazoe	Japan
Jill, Uncredited		Anthony Ing	United Kingdom
Lemon Tree		Rachel Walden	United States
None of That	Nada de todo eso	Francisco Cantón, Patricio Martínez	Argentina, Spain
Sonido: Ivans & Tobis		Diogo Baldaia	Portugal
Wander to Wonder		Nina Ganz, Nina Gantz	Netherlands, Belgium, France, United Kingdom

=== Punto de Encuentro ===
The following films were selected for the Punto de Encuentro section:

Feature-Length Films

English title	Original title	Director(s)	Production countrie(s)
Animal		Sofia Exarchou	Greece, Austria, Romania
Arthur&Diana		Sara Summa	Germany
Gasoline Rainbow		Bill Ross IV, Turner Ross	United States
Hello Darkness		Soda Jerk	Australia
Hoard		Luna Carmoon	United Kingdom
Muyeres		Marta Lallana	Spain
Cercano Invierno	Negu Hurbilak	Colectivo Negu: Ekain Albite, Adrià Roca, Nicolau Mallofré, Mikel Ibarguren	Spain
On the Go		María Giséle Royo, Julia De Castro	Spain
One Last Evening	Letzer Abend	Lukas Nathrath	Germany
Sirocco and the Kingdom of the Winds	Sirocco et le royaume des courants d'air	Benoît Chieux	France, Belgium
Stepne	Степне	Maryna Vroda	Ukraine, Germany, Poland, Slovakia
Sweet Dreams		Ena Sendijarević	Netherlands, Sweden, Indonesia, France
The Cage is Looking for a Bird	Kletka ishet ptitsu	Malika Musaeva	Monaco, Russia
The Feeling That the Time for Doing Something Has Passed		Joanna Arnow	United States
The Quiet Migration	Stille Liv	Malene Choi	Denmark

Short Films

English title	Original title	Director(s)	Production countrie(s)
Almost Forgotten	Quase me lembro	Dimitri Mihajlovic, Miguel Lima	Portugal
Heartbreak Hotel	Coeurs Brisés Hôtel	Emma Axelroud Bernard	France
Last Days of Summer		Stenzin Tankong	India, France
Nocturnal Burger	Nishachar Burger	Reema Sengupta	France
Z.O.		Loris G. Nese	Italy
La Noche del Corto Español (Spanish Short Films)
The Last Mouflon	El último muflón	Omar Razzak, Shira Ukrainitz	Spain
The Danube Rivers	Los Danubios	Jaume Claret Muxart	Spain
Lost at Sea		Andrés Bartos, Lucija Stojevic	Spain, United Kingdom
Meteor	Meteoro	Víctor Moreno	Spain
Crack of Dawn	Trench D'Alba	Anna Llargués	Spain

=== Tiempo de Historia ===
The following films were selected for the Tiempo de Historia section, dedicated to non-fiction films:

Feature-Length Films

English title	Original title	Director(s)	Production countrie(s)
Aresenie. An Amazing Afterlife	Arsenie. Viața de apoi	Alexandru Solomon	Romania, Luxembourg
Between Revolutions	Între Revoluții	Vlad Petri	Romania, Croatia, Qatar, Iran
Romance Scam	La estafa del amor	Virginia García del Pino	Spain
Malqueridas		Tana Gilbert	Chile, Germany
My Worst Enemy	Mon pire ennemi	Mehran Tamadon	France, Switzerland
Our Body	Notre Corps	Claire Simon	France
Pictures of Ghosts	Relatos fantasmas	Kleber Mendonça Filho	Brazil
The Mother of All Lies	كذب أبيض	Asmae El Moudir	Morocco, Saudi Arabia, Qatar, Egypt
An Inhabited Volcano	Un volcán habitado	David Pantaleón, Jose Víctor Fuentes	Spain
Where God Is Not	Jaii keh khoda nist	Mehran Tamadon	France, Switzerland
Youth (Spring)	青春 / Jeunesse (Le Printemps)	Wang Bing	France, Luxembourg, Netherlands
Zinzindurrunkarratz		Oskar Alegria	Spain

Short Films

English title	Original title	Director(s)	Production countrie(s)
Alpha Kings		Enrique Pedráza-Botero, Faye Tsakas	United States
Bleu Silico		Eloïse Le Gallo, Julia Borderie	France
The Open House	La casa oberta	Julieta Lasarte Pigrau	Spain
Bear	Ours	Morgane Frund	Switzerland
Future Ruins	Ruinas futuras	Carolina Sánchez, Elvira Arbós, Francisco Armenteros, Ran Chen	Spain

=== Alquimias ===
The following films were selected for the Alquimias section:

English title	Original title	Director(s)	Production countrie(s)
The Battle	A Batalha da Rua Maria Antônia	Vera Gito	Brazil
Critical Zone	Mantagheye bohrani	Ali Ahmadzadeh	Iran, Germany
The Peasants	Chłopi	DK Welchman, Hugh Welchman	Poland
Essential Truths of the Lake		Lav Diaz	Philippines, France, Portugal, Singapore, Italy, Switzerland, United Kingdom
Femme		Sam H. Freeman, Ng Choon Ping	United Kingdom
The Beast in the Jungle	La Bête dans la jungle	Patric Chiha	France
The Siren	La Sirène	Sepideh Farsi	France, Germany, Luxembourg, Belgium, Qatar
Three Brothers	Tres hermanos	Francisco J. Paparella	Argentina, Chile

=== Memoria y Utopía ===
The following films were selected for the Memoria y Utopía section, dedicated to restored films:

English title	Original title	Director(s)	Production countrie(s)
Noir et Blanc (1986)		Claire Devers	France
Black Head (1979)	Kara Kafa	Korhan Yurtsever	Turkey
Boat People (1982)	投奔怒海	Ann Hui	Hong Kong
Conscience (1968)		Volodymyr Denysenko	Soviet Union
Dark Spring (1970)		Ingemo Engström	Germany
Diario íntimo (1962)		Manuel López Yubero	Spain
Drylongso (1998)		Cauleen Smith	United States
Furia española (1974)		Francesc Betriu	Spain
L'Amour fou (1969)		Jacques Rivette	France
The Captive (2000)	La Captive	Chantal Akerman	Belgium
The First Look (2023)	La primera mirada	Luis E. Parés	Spain
Lucha de corazones (1912)		Joan Maria Codina	Spain
Maybe Tomorrow (1980)	Majd holnap	Judit Elek	Hungary
Millennium Mambo (2001)	千禧曼波	Hou Hsiao-hsien	Taiwan
Return to Reason (1923)		Man Ray	France
Sweet Dreams (1981)	Sogni d'oro	Nanni Moretti	Italy
Sor Angélica Virgen (1962)		Francisco Regueiro	Spain

=== EFA (European Film Academy) ===
The following films were selected for the EFA section, for European films chosen by the European Film Academy:

English title	Original title	Director(s)	Production countrie(s)
Anatomy of a Fall	Anatomie d'une chute	Justine Triet	France
Afire	Roter Himmel	Christian Petzold	Germany
Fallen Leaves	Kuolleet lehdet	Aki Kaurismäki	Finland
The Universal Theory	Die Theorie von Allem	Timm Kröger	Germany
The Promised Land	Bastarden	Nikolaj Arcel	Denmark
The Zone of Interest		Jonathan Glazer	United Kingdom, Poland
Io capitano		Matteo Garrone	Italy, Belgium, France

=== Educación ===
The following films were selected for the Educación section, consisting of Miniminci and Seminci Joven, for films intended for young audiences:

English title	Original title	Director(s)	Production countrie(s)
Miniminci
Foxtale		Alexandra Allen	Portugal
Impurrfection		Chiang Yao	Taiwan
Les Inséparables		Jérémie Degruson	Belgium, Spain, France
A Greyhound of a Girl		Enzo D'Alò	Estonia, Germany, Ireland, Italy, Latvia, Luxembourg, United Kingdom
Nina and the Hedgehog's Secret	Nina et le secret du hérisson	Alain Gagnol, Jean-Loup Felicioli	France, Luxembourg
Operación Frankenstein		José María Fernández de Vega	Spain
Robot Dreams		Pablo Berger	Spain, France
The Girl with the Red Beret		Janet Perlman	Canada
Tony, Shelly and the Magic Light	Tonda, Slávka a kouzelné světlo	Filip Pošivač	Hungary, Czech Republic
What's in That Crate?	Wat zit er in die kist?	Bram Algoed	Belgium
Witchfairy		Cédric Igodt, David Van de Weyer	Belgium, Bulgaria
Seminci Joven
And the King Said, What a Fantastic Machine		Axel Danielson, Maximilien Van Aertryck	Sweden, Denmark
Bulbul Can Sing		Rima Das	India
Croma Kid		Pablo Chea	Dominican Republic

=== Cine Gourmet ===
The following films were selected for the Cine Gourmet section, consisting of films that see gastronomy through the eyes of cinema:

English title	Original title	Director(s)	Production countrie(s)
The Pot-au-Feu	La Passion de Dodin Bouffant	Trần Anh Hùng	France, Belgium
I Will Not Starve	Non morirò di fame	Umberto Spinazzola	Italy, Canada

=== Cine de Castilla y León ===
The following films are productions made in Castile and León:

English title	Original title	Director(s)	Production countrie(s)
Feature-Length Films
Red Rooster	Gallo rojo	Enrique García-Vázquez	Spain
Rioja, Land of the Thousand Wines	Rioja, la tierra de los mil vinos	José Luis López-Linares	Spain
Supporting Actresses	Secundarias	Arturo Dueñas	Spain
Short Films
A Song for Lena	Alehre y olé	Clara Santaolaya	Spain
Caso Dativo		Juan Rodríguez-Briso	Spain
The Dad Jokes Are Killing Me	El cuñao	Javier Canal Diez	Spain
The King of the Week	El rey de la semana	David Pérez Sañudo	Spain
Knot	Nudo	Herminio Cardiel	Spain
Blonde Cooper	Rubio cobrizo	Pablo Quijano	Spain
Trigues tistres		Lucía Lobato	Spain
Light Leak	Velado	Carlos C. Insuela, Carla Voces	Spain
Quercus
Anticlimax		Néstor López, Óscar Romero	Spain, Portugal
Train to Oblivion	El tren del olvido	Isabel Medarde	Spain
Sour Milk	Leche agria	Sergio Muñoz Cano, José Ángel Lorente Pavón	Spain
Good T'See Ya	Malegro verte	Nüll García	Spain
Magistrates	Señorías	María Guerra	Spain
Vermú		Nestor Lopez	Spain

== Awards ==
Some of the festival award winners are listed as follows:

=== Official section ===
- Golden Spike: The Permanent Picture by Laura Ferrés
- Silver Spike: La chimera by Alice Rohrwacher
- Best Director: Angela Schanelec for Music
- Best Screenplay: Marco Bellocchio and Susanna Nicchiarelli for Kidnapped
- Best Actress: Léa Seydoux for The Beast
- Best Actor: Dave Turner for The Old Oak
- Best New Director: Molly Manning Walker for How to Have Sex
- Best Cinematography: Ivan Marković for Music
- Best Editing: Gesa Jäger for The Teachers' Lounge
- Golden Spike for Best Short Film: Wander to Wonder by Nina Gantz
- Silver Spike for Best Short Film: Aitana by Marina Alberti

=== Meeting Point ===
- Best Film: Gasoline Rainbow by Bill Ross IV, Turner Ross
- Special Jury Prize: Arthur&Diana by Sara Summa
- Special Mention: Animal by Sofia Exarchou
- Best Foreign Short: Nocturnal Burger by Reema Maya
- Special Mention for Best Foreign Short: Heartbreak Hotel by Emma Axelroud Bernard, Toujours Panthère
- The Night of Spanish Shorts Award: Meteoro by Víctor Moreno

=== Tiempo de Historia ===
- First Prize: Between Revolutions by Vlad Petri
- Second Prize: Pictures of Ghosts by Kleber Mendonça Filho
- Prize to the Best Short Documentary: Ours by Morgane Frund

=== Alquimias ===
- Recoletas Award for Best Feature Film: Femme by Sam H. Freeman, Ng Choon Ping
- Special Mention: Critical Zone by Ali Ahmadzadeh

=== Other awards ===
- Doc Spain Award: Zinzindurrunkarratz by Oskar Alegria
- Castilla y León Short Film Award: The King of the Week by David Pérez Sañudo
- Green Spike: Muyeres by Marta Lallana
  - Special Mention: Crack of Dawn by Anna Llargués
- FIPRESCI Award: Foremost by Night by Víctor Iriarte
- Fundos Award: The Battle by Vera Gito
- Audience Award Official Section: The Old Oak by Ken Loach
- Audience Award Meeting Point: Muyeres by Marta Lallana
- Audience Award Time of History: The Mother of All Lies by Asmae El Moudir
- Young SEMINCI Award: The Movie Teller by Lone Scherfig
- Young Jury Prize Official Section: How to Have Sex by Molly Manning Walker
- Meeting Point Youth Jury Award: One Last Evening by Lukas Nathrath
- Youth Jury Mention Meeting Point: Hello Darkness by Soda Jerk
- Rainbow Spike: All of Us Strangers by Andrew Haigh
  - Special Mention: On the Go by María Giséle Royo, Julia De Castro
