= 9 Moons =

- Film poster
- Spanish: 9 lunas
- Directed by: Patricia Ortega
- Screenplay by: Patricia Ortega; Olmo Figueredo González-Quevedo; José Ortuño
- Produced by: Olmo Figueredo González-Quevedo
- Starring: Zack Gómez-Rolls; Jorge Sanz; María León; Sara Sálamo; Fernando Guallar; Kiti Mánver
- Cinematography: Diego Dussuel
- Edited by: Fátima de los Santos
- Music by: Paloma Peñarrubia
- Production companies: La Claqueta PC; Produciendo Películas AIE; Amania Films; La Cruda Realidad; Acheron Films; Menuetto
- Distributed by: Caramel Films
- Release dates: 7 March 2026 (Málaga); 3 July 2026 (Spain)
- Running time: 101 minutes
- Countries: Spain; Belgium
- Language: Spanish

9 Moons (Spanish: 9 lunas) is a 2026 comedy film directed by Patricia Ortega. It stars Zack Gómez-Rolls alongside Jorge Sanz, María León, Sara Sálamo, Fernando Guallar, and Kiti Mánver. It is a Spanish-Belgian co-production.

== Plot ==
The life of personal trainer and trans man Ángel is upended after learning about his pregnancy, forcing him to suspend his testosterone gender-affirming care, testing his own ideas of masculinity.

== Cast ==
- Zack Gómez-Rolls as Ángel
- Jorge Sanz
- María León
- Sara Sálamo
- Fernando Guallar
- Kiti Mánver

== Production ==
The screenplay of 9 Moons was written by Ortega, José Ortuño and Olmo Figueredo González-Quevedo. The film was produced by La Claqueta PC, alongside La Cruda Realidad, Amania Films, and Menuetto Films, with the participation of Movistar Plus+ and Canal Sur and backing from ICAA, Creative Europe MEDIA, Eurimages, A.A.II.CC, and the Belgian Tax Shelter. It was shot in between Seville and the Canary Islands.

== Release ==
Crew and cast members (León, Ortega, Gómez-Rolls, Sálamo, Piedad, and Sanz) attending the 2026 Málaga Film Festival

The film was presented on 7 March 2026 at the 29th Málaga Film Festival. Distributed by Caramel Films, it is scheduled to be released theatrically in Spain on 3 July 2026.

== Reception ==
The 3-star review by Juan Manuel González in Cinemanía introduced the film as "a pleasant, if rather conventional, social fable".

Alfonso Rivera of Cineuropa deemed the film to be "a bright, buoyant film that camouflages its activism in favour of diversity and educating others' gaze beneath several layers of sweetness, humour and emotion".

== See also ==
- List of Spanish films of 2026
