= The Return (2013 film) =

- Spanish: El regreso
- Directed by: Patricia Ortega
- Written by: Patricia Ortega
- Produced by: Sergio Gómez Antillano
- Starring: Daniela González; Sofía Espinoza; Laureano Olivares; Jessica González
- Cinematography: Mauricio Siso
- Edited by: Sergio Curiel
- Music by: Javier Pedraja
- Production company: Mandrágora Films Zulia C.A.
- Release date: 30 August 2013 (Venezuela)
- Running time: 107 minutes
- Country: Venezuela
- Languages: Wayuu; Spanish

The Return (Spanish: El regreso) is a 2013 Venezuelan drama film directed by Patricia Ortega. The first Zulian film of this millennium, it premiered on 30 August 2013 in commercial cinemas in Venezuela.

== Plot ==
An armed group breaks the tranquility of the inhabitants of Bahía Portete in the Colombian Alta Guajira. In the midst of the horror and blood, women risk their lives to help their children escape. Shüliwala, a girl of only 10, manages to flee to a border city. But once she is in this strange territory, she must manage to survive and not lose hope of returning home.

== Cast ==
- Daniela González as Shüliwala
- Sofía Espinoza as Bárbara
- Gloria Jusayú as Nereida
- Dorila Echeto as Wattakuolu
- María Echeto as Dorila
- Laureano Olivares as Juan
- Jessica González as María
- Lilia González as Meche
- Aranaga Epiayú as José
- Adalberto Morales as Macunta
- Clara Prieto as Yonna
- Edelmira Hernández as Nisia
- Ángela Fernández as Wala
- Salvador Villegas as Marcos
- Segundo Bracho as Luis
- Antonio Villasmil as Caracortá
- Jesús Muñoz as Mechas
- Andrés Barrios as Parapeto
- Leonardo Isea as Pérez
- José Antonio Toledano as El gordo
- Gilberto González as Rodolfo
- Enrico Trabucchi as Queta

== Filming ==
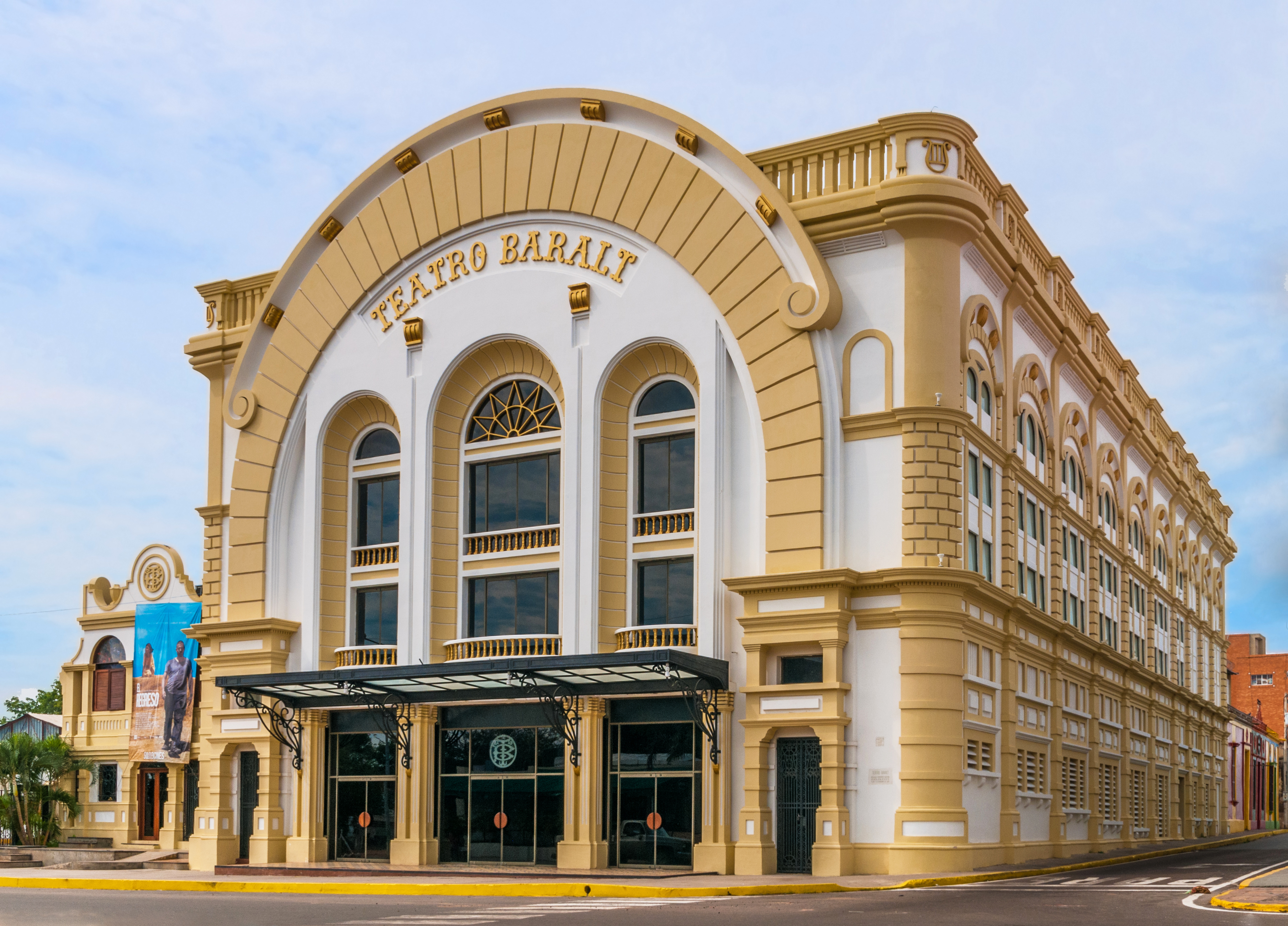
The Baralt Theatre in 2013, with a giant poster for the film hanging at its left

Filming took place between the community of Quisiro, Miranda Municipality, and Maracaibo, Zulia. Locations in the city of Marabina served as the setting for the film, including Las Pulgas market, Las Playitas Shopping Center, La Cañada Morillo, El Callejón de Los Pobres, and the surroundings of Plaza Bolívar.

== Theme and influences ==
The film is based on the real events of the Bahía Portete massacre, which took place in the Colombian Guajira on 16 April 2004. A paramilitary group broke into a Wayuu camp, killing people. Some bodies were found and others disappeared. It caused the involuntary displacement of some 600 people who took refuge in Zulia, Venezuela.

"It was decided to make a fiction film to protect the identity of those affected who are still struggling to recover their territory," clarified Patricia Ortega, and added that the beginning of the story of El Regreso is based on those events.

The Return shows part of the Wayuu culture during the beginning of the film. Later, during the ending, the main character takes over the screen with the experiences of the transition between flight, survival, and the journey back home. More than 70% of the language used in the film is indigenous Wayuu.

== Awards and nominations ==
Venue	Category	Recipient	Result
2013 Festival Entre Largos y Cortos de Oriente (ELCO)	Best First Feature	Patricia Ortega	Winner
2013 Festival Entre Largos y Cortos de Oriente (ELCO)	Art Direction	María Gabriela Vílchez	Winner
2013 Festival Entre Largos y Cortos de Oriente (ELCO)	Best Cinematography	Mauricio Siso	Winner
2013 Festival Entre Largos y Cortos de Oriente (ELCO)	Best Leading Actress	Daniela González	Winner
2014 San Diego Latino Film Festival			Contestant
2014 Vancouver International Women in Film Festival	Best Cinematography	Mauricio Siso	Winner
2014 Margarita Latin American and Caribbean Film Festival	Golden Pelican for Best Fiction Feature		Winner
