= 3rd Carmen Awards =

2024 Andalusian film awards

- Date: 3 February 2024
- Site: Casa Colón, Huelva, Andalusia, Spain
- Hosted by: Martita de Graná; Salva Reina
- Organized by: Andalusian Film Academy

Highlights
- Best Picture: Close Your Eyes
- Honorary career award: José Luis Gómez
- Best Actor: Víctor Clavijo; The Wait
- Best Actress: Kiti Mánver; Mamacruz
- Most awards: Love & Revolution (5)
- Most nominations: Love & Revolution, The Wait, Mamacruz (11)

Television coverage
- Network: Canal Sur

The 3rd Carmen Awards ceremony, presented by the Andalusian Film Academy, took place on 3 February 2024 at Huelva's Casa Colón. It was hosted by Martita de Graná and Salva Reina.

== Background ==
In November 2023, during the Huelva Ibero-American Film Festival, Huelva was announced as the host city. In December 2023, actor José Luis Gómez was announced as the recipient of the Carmen Honorary Award. Nominations were read by director-producer Remedios Málvarez and actor Vicente Vergara on 20 December 2023. The gala was hosted by Salva Reina and Martita de Graná and featured musical performances by Chanel as well as by the nominees to the award for best original song.

== Winners and nominations ==
The winners and nominees are listed as follows:

Best Fiction Feature Film: Close Your Eyes; The Wait; Mamacruz; Love & Revolution	Best Director: Patricia Ortega — Mamacruz; Manuel Martín Cuenca — Andrea's Love; Arturo Menor— Iberia, naturaleza infinita; F. Javier Gutiérrez — The Wait
Best Original Screenplay: Alejandro Marín, Carmen Garrido — Love & Revolution; Manuel Martín Cuenca, Lola Mayo — Andrea's Love; F. Javier Gutiérrez — The Wait; Patricia Ortega, José Ortuño — Mamacruz	Best Adapted Screenplay: José Antonio Hergueta, Regina Álvarez Lorenzo — Caleta Palace; Manuel Néctor Ortega Yáñez — A Dios pongo por testigo
Best Actor: Víctor Clavijo — The Wait; Manolo Solo — Close Your Eyes; José Manuel Poga — The Fortress; Salva Reina — Truce(s)	Best Actress: Kiti Mánver — Mamacruz; Inma Cuesta — Just One Small Favor; Mara Guil — Isósceles; Helena Kaittani — La Singla
Best Supporting Actor: Jesús Carroza — Love & Revolution; Sebastián Haro — Amanece; Julián Villagrán — How to Become a Modern Man; Manuel Morón — The Wait; Pedro Casablanc — The Wait	Best Supporting Actress: Mari Paz Sayago — Mamacruz; María León — Close Your Eyes; Petra Martínez — Close Your Eyes; Silvia Acosta — Fueron los días
Best New Actor: Antonio Estrada — The Wait; Gregor Acuña-Pohl — Fueron los días; La Dani — Love & Revolution; Omar Banana — Love & Revolution	Best New Actress: Lupe Mateo Barredo — Andrea's Love; Mercedes Moral — Mamacruz; Alex de la Croix — Love & Revolution; Carmen Orellana — Love & Revolution
Best New Director: Alejandro Marín — Love & Revolution; Paz Jiménez Díaz — How to Become a Modern Man; Rocío Mesa — Tobacco Barns; Bernabé Bulnes — Fueron los días	Best Original Score: Paloma Peñarrubia — Tobacco Barns; Isabel Royán — Alimañas; Pablo Cervantes — Aníbal. El arquitecto de Sevilla; Miguel Rivera — How to Become a Modern Man
Best Original Song: "Soy como soy" by Miguel Rivera (How to Become a Modern Man); "Tú eres mi camino" by Sitoh Ortega and Sole Candela (Camino de la suerte); "De perdidos a río" by Fran Perea (De perdidos a Río); "Tu hoguera" by Raúl Bernal (Fueron los días)	Best Cinematography: Alejandro Espadero — Tin & Tina; Arturo Menor — Iberia, naturaleza infinita; Fran Fernández Pardo — Mamacruz; Álex Catalán — Siete jereles
Best Production Supervision: Carmen Garrido — Love & Revolution; Sandra Rodríguez — How to Become a Modern Man; Manolo Limón — Mamacruz; Irene Hens — Un día Lobo López	Best Documentary Feature Film: Iberia, naturaleza infinita; Aníbal. El arquitecto de Sevilla; La Singla; Un día Lobo López
Best Editing: Fátima de los Santos — Mamacruz; José M. G. Moyano, Manuel Terceño— Iberia, naturaleza infinita; F. Javier Gutiérrez — The Wait; Fernando Franco — Robot Dreams	Best Costume Design: Consuelo Bahamonde, Andrea Escudero — The Wait; Lourdes Fuentes — Tin & Tina; Esther Vaquero — Mamacruz; Merche Sanz — Tobacco Barns
Best Sound: Jorge Marín — Iberia, naturaleza infinita; Antuan Mejías, Jorge Marín — How to Become a Modern Man; Daniel de Zayas— Andrea's Love; Antuán Mejías, Fonsi Gil — Love & Revolution	Best Art Direction: Vanesa de la Haza — Tin & Tina; Yoyi Mauriño, F. Javier Gutiérrez — The Wait; José Luis Ágreda — Robot Dreams; Sergio Mauriño — Tobacco Barns
Best Makeup and Hairstyles: Carmela Martín — Love & Revolution; Rafael Mora, Anabel Beato — How to Become a Modern Man; Anabel Beato, Carmela Martín — Mamacruz; Anabel Beato, Carmela Martín, Eduardo Pérez — Tin & Tina	Best Special Effects: Amparo Martínez — Tobacco Barns; Juan Ventura Pellecín — Iberia, naturaleza infinita; Joaquín Ortega — The Wait; Juan Ventura Pecellín, Amparo Martínez Barco — Tin & Tina
Best Fiction Short Film: Lava; Pompita; Siembra; Todo va bien	Best Documentary Short Film: Mothertruckers; 7:11 Cuarzo; En mi piel; Los espantos
Best Non-Andalusian Produced Film: Society of the Snow; 20,000 Species of Bees; Robot Dreams; Un amor

=== Films with multiple nominations and awards ===
Films that received multiple nominations
Nominations	Film
11	Love & Revolution
11	Mamacruz
11	The Wait
7	How to Become a Modern Man
5	Tin & Tina
5	Tobacco Barns
5	Iberia, naturaleza infinita
4	Close Your Eyes
4	Andrea's Love
3	Robot Dreams
3	Fueron los días
2	La Singla
2	Aníbal. El arquitecto de Sevilla
2	Un día Lobo López

Films that received multiple awards
Awards	Film
5	Love & Revolution
4	Mamacruz
3	The Wait
3	Tin & Tina
2	Tobacco Barns
2	Iberia, naturaleza infinita
