= Habla, mudita =

1973 film

- Spanish poster
- Directed by: Manuel Gutiérrez Aragón
- Written by: Manuel Gutiérrez Aragón; José Luis García Sánchez
- Starring: José Luis López Vázquez; Kiti Manver
- Cinematography: Luis Cuadrado
- Edited by: Pablo González del Amo
- Release date: June 1973
- Running time: 88 minutes
- Country: Spain
- Language: Spanish

Habla, mudita is a 1973 Spanish drama film directed by Manuel Gutiérrez Aragón. It was entered into the 23rd Berlin International Film Festival. It was also selected as the Spanish entry for the Best Foreign Language Film at the 46th Academy Awards, but was not accepted as a nominee.

== Plot ==
Don Ramiro, a man worried about language problems, spends his holidays in a small town in the Cantabrian mountains. There he meets a young mute shepherdess, by whom he becomes fascinated, in a provincial world, with a flat vision of existence.

== Cast ==
- José Luis López Vázquez - Ramiro
- Kiti Manver - La Muda
- Francisco Algora - El Mudo
- Hanna Haxmann
- Francisco Guijar
- Susan Taff
- Marisa Porcel
- Rosa de Alba
- Edy Lage
- María de la Riva
- Pedrín Fernández
- Lucy Tiller
- Manuel Guitián
- Carmen Liaño
- Vicente Roca

== See also ==
- List of submissions to the 46th Academy Awards for Best Foreign Language Film
- List of Spanish submissions for the Academy Award for Best Foreign Language Film
