= Tin & Tina =

2023 film by Rubin Stein

- Theatrical release poster
- Directed by: Rubin Stein
- Screenplay by: Rubin Stein
- Produced by: Olmo Figueredo González-Quevedo
- Starring: Milena Smit; Jaime Lorente; Carlos G. Morollón; Anastasia Russo; Teresa Rabal
- Cinematography: Alejandro Espadero
- Edited by: Nacho Ruiz Capillas
- Music by: Jocelyn Pook
- Production companies: La Claqueta PC; Tin&Tina La Película AIE; Miami Film Gate; Andarams Films
- Distributed by: Filmax (Spain)
- Release dates: 23 March 2023 (FANT); 31 March 2023 (Spain)
- Countries: Spain; United States; Romania
- Language: Spanish

Tin & Tina is a 2023 psychological horror-thriller film directed by Rubin Stein, which stars Milena Smit and Jaime Lorente alongside Carlos González Morollón and Anastasia Russo. It is an adaptation of the 2013 short film of the same name.

== Plot ==
In the early 1980s in Spain, Lola, a pregnant woman, marries Adolfo, the man who presumably got her pregnant. During their wedding, Lola suffers a miscarriage and is told she cannot have children again, plunging her into depression. Adolfo talks Lola into adopting children from the convent orphanage nearby, and the two end up adopting Tin and Tina, twins with albinism of an older age than the couple originally planned to adopt. The twins share a gift for music and particularly strong religious beliefs that somewhat unnerve Lola. Although Lola and Adolfo are not religious, they pretend to be to make the twins happy. However, soon enough, the twins' odd religious beliefs begin to disturb Lola as they play disturbing biblical games that are practically lethal, and after Lola's dog bites her they kill it to 'cleanse its soul' without realizing it won't come back to life afterward. When the twins receive their first communion, a classmate of theirs who bullied them falls into a coma, and Lola suspects that the twins were behind it. Lola eventually learns that the boy is dead, but Adolfo refuses to believe her and does not seem too worried about the twins' behavior.

Lola faints on New Year's Eve and finds out that she is pregnant, much to her shock and horror. The twins become overexcited about having a little sibling, and Lola grows more distant from them. After Tin and Tina tie Lola up and attempt to inject her with a potentially poison-filled syringe to 'feed the baby', Lola raises a knife to defend herself, much to the shock of Adolfo; her water breaks at that time, and after Lola gives birth the twins share enthusiastically that they want the baby to be baptized. When Lola refuses, the children nearly drown the baby by trying to baptize him themselves. Lola and Adolfo become enraged, leading to Adolfo burning their Bible and sending them back to the convent.

Lola and Adolfo's relationship gradually starts to fall apart after Tin and Tina are sent back to the convent. Soon, Lola begins to contemplate a divorce. One night, as the couple are conversing, a house fire ensues due to a strike of lightning, leading to the death of Adolfo. In the chaos, Lola loses track of the baby. Suspecting the children are involved, Lola attempts to speak to God by nearly killing herself, then searches for and finds her baby, after which she runs from the burning house.

Lola wakes up in a hospital and is visited by the head of the convent from where she adopted Tin and Tina. The head tells her that her husband passed away and that he was struck by lightning. She informs Lola that she and her baby survived, which was a miracle. Lola enquires about the children's whereabouts during that night and learns they were at the convent all night supposedly. The head assures her that the children have always been innocent and Lola believes her. The film ends with Lola at her husband's funeral, having adopted Tin and Tina again.

== Cast ==
- Milena Smit as Lola
- Jaime Lorente as Adolfo
- Carlos González Morollón as Tin
- Anastasia Russo as Tina
- Teresa Rabal as sor Asunción
- Ruth Gabriel as madre Pedrito
- Chelo Vivares
- Luis Perezagua

== Production ==
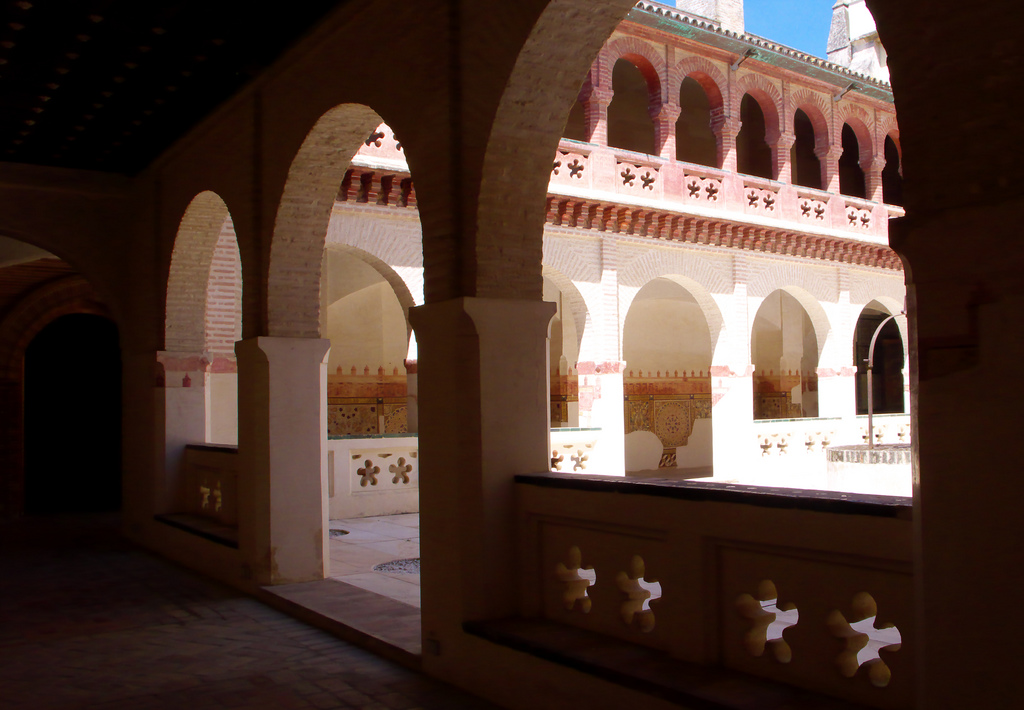
Footage was shot in the cloister of the monastery of San Isidoro del Campo in Santiponce.

Tin & Tina is the feature film adaptation of the 2013 short film of the same name directed by Rubin Stein. Featuring Olmo Figueredo González-Quevedo as producer, the film was produced by La Claqueta PC and Tin&Tina La Película AIE alongside Miami Film Gate and Andarams Films, with the participation of Canal Sur Radio y Televisión and Netflix, support from ICAA and A.A.II.CC., and the collaboration of Latido Films.

Shooting began on 27 July 2021. It wrapped after 7 weeks, by September 2021. Shot in the province of Seville, shooting locations included the Hacienda San Felipe in Gerena and the Monastery of San Isidoro del Campo in Santiponce.

== Release ==
Filmax secured the film's domestic distribution in Spain. The film was scheduled to receive a pre-screening at Bilbao's FANT festival on 23 March 2023. It had a tentative theatrical release date in Spain set for 24 March 2023. Its release was pushed back to 31 March 2023.

== Reception ==
On the review aggregator website Rotten Tomatoes, 56% of 9 critics' reviews are positive, with an average rating of 6.30/10.

== Accolades ==
Year	Award	Category	Nominee(s)	Result	Ref.
2024	3rd Carmen Awards	Best Art Direction	Vanesa de la Haza	Won	
2024	3rd Carmen Awards	Best Cinematography	Alejandro Espadero	Won	
2024	3rd Carmen Awards	Best Costume Design	Lourdes Fuentes	Won	
2024	3rd Carmen Awards	Best Makeup and Hairstyles	Anabel Beato, Carmela Martín, Eduardo Pérez	Nominated	
2024	3rd Carmen Awards	Best Special Effects	Juan Ventura Pecellín, Amparo Martínez Barco	Nominated	
2024	38th Goya Awards	Best Special Effects	Mariano García Marty, Jon Serrano, Juan Ventura, Amparo Martínez	Nominated	

== See also ==
- List of Spanish films of 2023
