= Víctor Clavijo =

Spanish actor

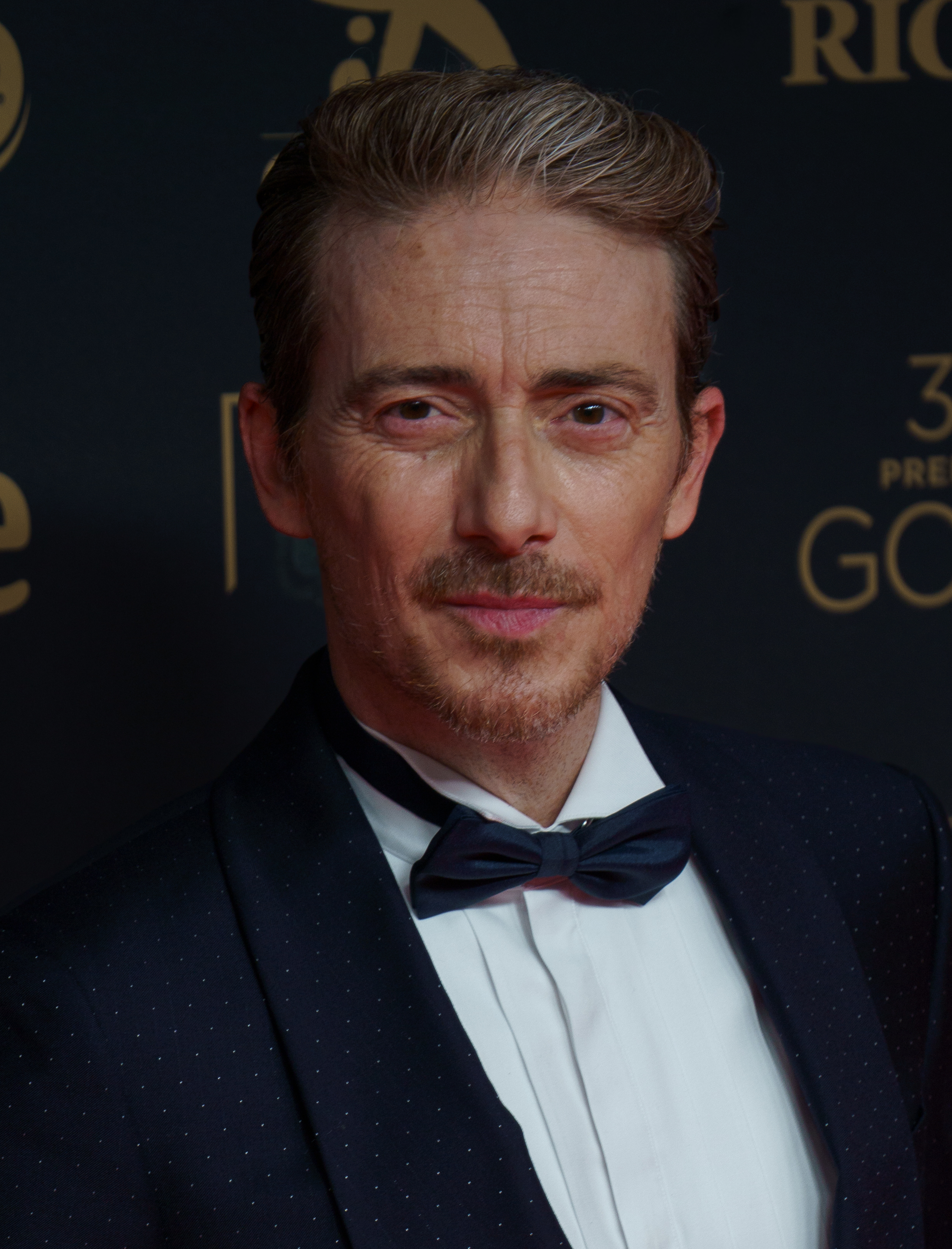
- Clavijo in 2025
- Born: Víctor Clavijo Cobos; 28 September 1973 (age 52); Algeciras, Spain
- Education: RESAD
- Occupations: Actor, photographer
- Spouse: Montse Pla (m. 2012)

Víctor Clavijo Cobos (born 28 September 1973) is a Spanish actor. He earned early public recognition in Spain for his performance in the serial Al salir de clase.

== Life and career ==
Víctor Clavijo Cobos was born in Algeciras on 28 September 1973. He studied at the Colegio Puerta del Mar and the Instituto Isla Verde in his native city. He studied law at the University of Granada but he eventually dropped out and moved instead to Madrid, graduating in Drama from the RESAD. Besides his theatrical performances, his first non-stage role came in 1995 with a performance in the short film David.

He landed one of his first television roles in the series Menudo es mi padre, where Clavijo played the son of El Fary's second wife. Clavijo landed his big screen debut in Un buen novio (1998). He became popular in Spain some time later for his breakout role as Raúl Daroca in the soap opera Al salir de clase, which he performed from 1998 to 2000.

In 2025, the municipal corporation of Algeciras approved a proposal to declare him 'Favourite Son' of the city.

== Filmography ==
=== Television ===
Year	Title	Role	Notes	Ref.
1998–2000	Al salir de clase	Raúl Daroca	Main. Introduced in season 2	
2006	Tirando a dar	Alejo	Main	
2006	Mujeres	Nicolás		
2009–2010	La señora	Fernando Alcázar	Main	
2010	Karabudjan	Dani		
2011; 2018–2019	14 de abril. La República	Fernando Alcázar	Reprise of his role in La señora	
2012–2013	Gran Hotel	Fernando Llanes/Ángel Alarcón	Recurring. Seasons 2–3	
2013	Gran Reserva. El origen	Vicente Cortázar	Main. Prequel of Gran Reserva. Older version in the original series performed by Emilio Gutiérrez Caba	
2014	El corazón del océano	Hernando de Trejo	TV miniseries. Produced in 2011	
2014	Hermanos	Damián Jurado		
2014	Prim, el asesinato de la calle del Turco	José Paúl y Angulo	TV movie	
2014	Cuéntame un cuento	Andrés (The Wolf)	Anthology series. Episode 1: Los tres cerditos	
2015–2016	Carlos, rey emperador	Francis Borgia	Main	
2016	Lo que escondían sus ojos	Antonio Tovar	TV miniseries	
2015–2017	El ministerio del tiempo	Lope de Vega	Recurring. Seasons 1–3	
2017	Cuéntame cómo pasó	Dr. Martín Broto	Recurring. Season 18	
2017–2018	Amar es para siempre	Diego Durán	Main. Season 6	
2019	Hernán	Cristóbal de Olid	Main	
2020	30 monedas (30 Coins)	Mario	Guest	
2020	Diarios de la cuarentena	Víctor	Main	
2021	Ana Tramel. El juego (ANA. all in)	Gabriel	Main	
2024	La ley del mar (The Law of the Sea)	Vicent		
2024	El Marqués	Rafael Pertierra de Medina, marqués de Bahía y Sobrarbe		

=== Feature film ===
Key
†	Denotes films that have not yet been released

Year	Title	Role	Notes	Ref.
2002	El caballero Don Quijote (Don Quixote, Knight Errant)	Barbero		
2003	El regalo de Silvia (Silvia's Gift)	Mateo		
2004	El principio de Arquímedes (The Archimedes Principle)	Pedro		
2008	Tres días (Before the Fall)	Ale		
2010	18 comidas (18 Meals)			
2011	Camera obscura	Tío Antonio		
2011	Verbo	Tótem		
2012	Silencio en la nieve (Frozen Silence)	Sargento Estrada / Ferrer		
2012	Impávido (Poker Face)	El Botas		
2012	Holmes & Watson. Madrid Days			
2015	Sicarivs: La noche y el silencio	Sicario		
2017	Llueven vacas	Fernando	Character is portrayed by 6 actors throughout the film	
2023	La espera (The Wait)	Eladio		
2024	La infiltrada (Undercover)	Teruel		
TBA	La maleta †			

== Accolades ==
Year	Award	Category	Work	Result	Ref.
2004	18th Goya Awards	Best New Actor	Silvia's Gift	Nominated	
2007	16th Actors and Actresses Union Awards	Best Television Actor in a Minor Role	Mujeres	Won	
2009	9th Screamfest Horror Film Festival	Best Actor	Before the Fall	Won	
2010	19th Actors and Actresses Union Awards	Best Television Actor in a Secondary Role	La señora	Won	
2011	20th Actors and Actresses Union Awards	Best Film Actor in a Secondary Role	18 Meals	Won	
2012	21st Actors and Actresses Union Awards	Best Television Actor in a Minor Role	14 de abril. La República	Nominated	
2012	21st Actors and Actresses Union Awards	Best Film Actor in a Minor Role	Frozen Silence	Nominated	
2013	22nd Actors and Actresses Union Awards	Best Film Actor in a Secondary Role	Holmes & Watson. Madrid Days	Nominated	
2015	24th Actors and Actresses Union Awards	Best Television Actor in a Leading Role	Cuéntame un cuento — Episode: "Los tres cerditos"	Won	
2016	25th Actors and Actresses Union Awards	Best Stage Actor in a Secondary Role	Fausto	Won	
2016	25th Actors and Actresses Union Awards	Best Television Actor in a Minor Role	El ministerio del tiempo	Nominated	
2018	27th Actors and Actresses Union Awards	Best Television Actor in a Minor Role	El ministerio del tiempo	Won	
2018	27th Actors and Actresses Union Awards	Best Film Actor in a Secondary Role	Llueven vacas	Nominated	
2020	29th Actors and Actresses Union Awards	Best Stage Actor in a Secondary Role	Lehman trilogy	Won	
2024	3rd Carmen Awards	Best Actor	The Wait	Won	
2024	32nd Actors and Actresses Union Awards	Best Film Actor in a Minor Role	Someone Who Takes Care of Me	Won	
2026	34th Actors and Actresses Union Awards	Best Stage Actor in a Minor Role	Blaubeeren	Won	
