= Chinas, a Second Generation Story =

- Theatrical release poster
- Spanish: Chinas
- Directed by: Arantxa Echevarría
- Screenplay by: Arantxa Echevarría
- Produced by: Jaime Ortiz de Artiñano; Pilar Sánchez Díaz; Gonzalo Salazar-Simpson; Arantxa Echevarría
- Starring: Daniela Shiman Yang; Xinyi Ye; Ella Qiu; Pablo Molinero; Leonor Watling; Carolina Yuste
- Cinematography: Pilar Sánchez Díaz
- Edited by: Renato Sanjuan
- Music by: Marina Herlop
- Production companies: Tvtec Servicios Audiovisuales; Lazona Producciones; Hojalata Films AIE
- Distributed by: A Contracorriente Films
- Release dates: 27 September 2023 (Zinemaldia); 6 October 2023 (Spain)
- Country: Spain
- Languages: Mandarin Chinese; Spanish
- Box office: €0.47 million

Chinas, a Second Generation Story (Spanish: Chinas) is a 2023 Spanish drama film directed by Arantxa Echevarría which stars alongside Shiman Yang, Xinyi Ye, and Ella Qiu alongside Pablo Molinero, Leonor Watling, and Carolina Yuste.

== Plot ==
Set in Usera, the plot follows the stories of a 9-year-old girl of Chinese parents (Lucía), her older teenage sister (Claudia), and another 9-year-old adopted girl of Chinese origin (Xiang).

== Cast ==
- Daniela Shiman Yang
- Xinyi Ye
- Ella Qiu
- Pablo Molinero
- Leonor Watling
- Carolina Yuste

== Production ==
The film is a Tvtec Servicios Audiovisuales, Lazona Producciones, and Hojalata Films AIE production, with the participation of RTVE, Orange, Movistar Plus+ and backing from ICAA. Shooting locations included Usera.

== Release ==
The film was programmed to have its premiere in a RTVE gala of the 71st San Sebastián International Film Festival, screening on 27 September 2023. Distributed by A Contracorriente Films, it was released theatrically in Spain on 6 October 2023.

== Accolades ==
Year	Award	Category	Nominee(s)	Result	Ref.
2023	29th Forqué Awards	Cinema and Education in Values		Nominated	
2024	79th CEC Medals	Best Original Screenplay	Arantxa Echevarría	Nominated	
2024	79th CEC Medals	Best Supporting Actress	Carolina Yuste	Nominated	
2024	79th CEC Medals	Best New Actress	Xinyi Ye	Won	
2024	79th CEC Medals	Best New Actress	Yeju Ji	Nominated	
2024	79th CEC Medals	Best New Actor	Julio Hu Chen	Nominated	
2024	38th Goya Awards	Best New Actress	Xinyi Ye	Nominated	
2024	38th Goya Awards	Best New Actress	Yeju Ji	Nominated	
2024	38th Goya Awards	Best New Actor	Julio Hu Chen	Nominated	
2024	38th Goya Awards	Best Original Song	"Chinas" by Marina Herlop	Nominated	
2024	32nd Actors and Actresses Union Awards	Best Film Actress in a Minor Role	Yeju Ji	Won	
2024	32nd Actors and Actresses Union Awards	Best New Actor	Julio Hu Chen	Won	
2024	32nd Actors and Actresses Union Awards	Best New Actress	Xinyi Ye	Won	

== See also ==
- List of Spanish films of 2023
