= Mamacruz =

2023 Spanish film by Patricia Ortega

- Directed by: Patricia Ortega
- Screenplay by: Patricia Ortega; José Ortuño
- Produced by: Olmo Figueredo González-Quevedo; Carlos Rosado Sibon; José Alba
- Starring: Kiti Mánver; Pepe Quero; Inés Benítez Viñuela; Silvia Acosta; Mari Paz Sayago
- Cinematography: Fran Fernández-Pardo
- Edited by: Fátima de los Santos
- Music by: Paloma Peñarrubia
- Production companies: La Claqueta PC; Mamacruz AIE; Pecado Films; Mandrágora Films
- Distributed by: Filmax
- Release dates: 20 January 2023 (Sundance); 27 October 2023 (Spain)
- Countries: Spain; Venezuela
- Language: Spanish
- Box office: €27,711

Mamacruz is a 2023 Spanish-Venezuelan comedy-drama film directed by Patricia Ortega and written by Ortega and José Ortuño. It stars Kiti Mánver.

== Plot ==
The plot concerns the rediscovery of an old woman's long-forgotten sexuality and desire.

== Cast ==
- Kiti Mánver as Mamacruz
- Pepe Quero as Eduardo
- Silvia Acosta as Carlota
- Mari Paz Sayago as Marina
- Inés Benítez Viñuela

== Production ==
Initially developed by Ortega in her native Venezuela, the project did not manage to persuade potential co-producers to work in the country. Upon a meeting of Ortega with Olmo Figueredo at 2019 Rome's MIA Market, the project eventually moved across the Atlantic to Spain. The screenplay was penned by Ortega alongside José Ortuño, who helped to adapt the script to a "Sevillian idiosyncrasy".

A Spanish-Venezuelan co-production, the film was produced by La Claqueta PC, Mamacruz AIE, and Pecado Films alongside Mandrágora Films, with the participation of Canal Sur Radio y Televisión, support from ICAA, and help from A.A.II.CC. Shooting locations included Seville.

== Release ==
Selected for the 'World Cinema Dramatic Competition' slate, Mamacruz premiered at the 2023 Sundance Film Festival on 20 January 2023. Filmax swooped on international rights to the film in advance of its world premiere. It also made it to an out-of-competition slot of the official selection of the 68th Valladolid International Film Festival for its European premiere. It opened in Spanish theatres on 27 October 2023.

== Reception ==
According to the American review aggregation website Rotten Tomatoes, Mamacruz has a 100% approval rating based on 19 reviews from critics, with an average rating of 7.9/10.

Jonathan Holland of ScreenDaily assessed that "the veteran Manver delivers a masterclass in nuance as a quietly-spoken, humble and repressed woman undergoing a violent inner transformation".

Jacob Oller of Paste deemed Mamacruz to be "a vibrant and lovely character study", that "makes the most of its horny matriarch".

Laurence Boyce of Cineuropa deemed the film to be a "personal and affecting piece of work that is both an achingly human portrait of a woman exploring her desires in her later years and a celebration of female sexuality".

== Accolades ==
Year	Award	Category	Nominee(s)	Result	Ref.
2024	11th Feroz Awards	Best Comedy Film		Nominated	
2024	11th Feroz Awards	Best Actress in a Film	Kiti Mánver	Nominated	
2024	3rd Carmen Awards	Best Film		Nominated	
2024	3rd Carmen Awards	Best Director	Patricia Ortega	Won	
2024	3rd Carmen Awards	Best Original Screenplay	Patricia Ortega, José Ortuño	Nominated	
2024	3rd Carmen Awards	Best Actress	Kiti Mánver	Won	
2024	3rd Carmen Awards	Best Supporting Actress	Mari Paz Sayago	Won	
2024	3rd Carmen Awards	Best New Actress	Mercedes Moral	Nominated	
2024	3rd Carmen Awards	Best Cinematography	Fran Fernández Pardo	Nominated	
2024	3rd Carmen Awards	Best Editing	Fátima de los Santos	Won	
2024	3rd Carmen Awards	Best Production Supervision	Manolo Limón	Nominated	
2024	3rd Carmen Awards	Best Costume Design	Esther Vaquero	Nominated	
2024	3rd Carmen Awards	Best Makeup and Hairstyles	Anabel Beato, Carmela Martín	Nominated	
2024	38th Goya Awards	Best Editing	Fátima de los Santos	Nominated	

== See also ==
- List of Spanish films of 2023
