= Andrea's Love =

2023 Spanish-Mexican drama film

- Film poster
- Spanish: El amor de Andrea
- Directed by: Manuel Martín Cuenca
- Screenplay by: Lola Mayo; Manuel Martín Cuenca
- Produced by: Gonzalo Salazar-Simpson; Manuel Martín Cuenca; Jaime Ortiz de Artiñano; Luis Collar
- Starring: Lupe Mateo Barredo; Fidel Sierra; Cayetano Rodríguez Anglada; Agustín Domínguez; Irka Lugo; Jesús Ortiz
- Cinematography: Eva Díaz Iglesias
- Edited by: Ángel Hernández Zoido
- Music by: Vetusta Morla
- Production companies: La Loma Blanca PC; LaZona; El amor de Andrea AIE; Nephilim; Alebrije Cine y Vídeo
- Distributed by: Filmax
- Release dates: 23 October 2023 (Seminci); 24 November 2023 (Spain)
- Countries: Spain; Mexico
- Language: Spanish

Andrea's Love (Spanish: El amor de Andrea) is a 2023 drama film directed by Manuel Martín Cuenca from a screenplay by Lola Mayo and Martín Cuenca. It is a Spanish-Mexican co-production.

== Plot ==
Set in Cádiz, the plot follows 15-year-old Andrea, the eldest of three siblings, seeking to rekindle with her father following her parents' divorce.

== Cast ==
- Lupe Mateo Barredo as Andrea
- Fidel Sierra
- Cayetano Rodríguez Anglada
- Agustín Domínguez
- Irka Lugo
- Jesús Ortiz
- Inés Amieva
- Jose M. Verdulla Otero

== Production ==
The film was penned by helmer Manuel Martín Cuenca alongside Lola Mayo, rather than with Martín Cuenca's regular co-scribe Alejandro Hernández. The film was produced by La Loma Blanca PC, LaZona, Nephilim, and El amor de Andrea AIE, alongside Alebrije Cine y Vídeo, with participation of RTVE and Canal Sur, funding from ICAA, backing from AAIICC, and sponsoring by Diputación de Cádiz. It was fully shot in the Bay of Cádiz. Footage was shot in chronological order.

== Release ==
The film had its world premiere at the 68th Valladolid International Film Festival on 23 October 2023. It also made it to the official selection competition of the Tallinn Black Nights Film Festival (PÖFF) for its international premiere. It was released theatrically in Spain on 24 November 2023 by Filmax.

== Reception ==
Philipp Engel of Cinemanía rated the film 4 out of 5 stars, describing it as a "a spiritual family drama with Atlantic airs" in the verdict.

Beatriz Martínez of Fotogramas rated the film 4 out of 5 stars, highlighting the director's brilliant change of register [from his previous filmography].

Sergi Sánchez of La Razón rated the film 3½ out of 5 stars, highlighting as its hallmark the "naturalistic sensibility" at portraying the life of a teenager making uncomfortable questions.

Javier Ocaña of El País wrote that Andrea's Love is so austere that it is not by chance that the film is compared by specialists to Robert Bresson's cinema.

=== Top ten lists ===
The film appeared on a number of critics' top ten lists of the best Spanish films of 2023:

- 10th — El Cultural (critics)

== Accolades ==
Year	Award	Category	Nominee(s)	Result	Ref.
2023	27th Tallinn Black Nights Film Festival	Best Director	Manuel Martín Cuenca	Won	
2023	27th Tallinn Black Nights Film Festival	Best Script	Manuel Martín Cuenca, Lola Mayo	Won	
2024	3rd Carmen Awards	Best Director	Manuel Martín Cuenca	Nominated	
2024	3rd Carmen Awards	Best Original Screenplay	Manuel Martín Cuenca, Lola Mayo	Nominated	
2024	3rd Carmen Awards	Best New Actress	Lupe Mateo Barredo	Won	
2024	3rd Carmen Awards	Best Sound	Daniel de Zayas	Nominated	
2024	79th CEC Medals	Best New Actress	Lupe Mateo Barredo	Nominated	
2024	38th Goya Awards	Best Original Song	"El amor de Andrea" by Vetusta Morla & Valeria Castro	Nominated	

== See also ==
- List of Spanish films of 2023
