= Teresa (2023 film) =

- Theatrical release poster
- Directed by: Paula Ortiz
- Screenplay by: Paula Ortiz; Javier García Arredondo
- Based on: La lengua en pedazos by Juan Mayorga
- Produced by: Alex Lafuente; Valérie Delpierre
- Starring: Blanca Portillo; Asier Etxeandía; Greta Fernández; Ainet Jounou; Luis Bermejo; Cayetano Fernández; Claudia Traisac; Consuelo Trujillo; Urko Olazábal; Julia de Castro
- Cinematography: Rafa García
- Production companies: Bluebird Films; Inicia Films; La Lengua en Pedazos AIE; Nu Boyana Portugal
- Distributed by: BTeam Pictures
- Release dates: 23 October 2023 (Seminci); 24 November 2023 (Spain)
- Countries: Spain; Portugal
- Language: Spanish

Teresa is a 2023 drama film directed by Paula Ortiz based on the play La lengua en pedazos by Juan Mayorga starring Blanca Portillo and Greta Fernández as the title character opposite to Asier Etxeandia, the Inquisitor.

== Plot ==
The plot follows the dialectic duel between mystic nun Teresa of Ávila and an inquisitor, delving into the former's life memories and beliefs.

== Cast ==
- Blanca Portillo as Teresa (old)
- Greta Fernández as Teresa (young)
- Ainet Jounou as Teresa (child)
- Asier Etxeandia as Inquisitor
- Consuelo Trujillo as Guiomar
- Cayetano Fernández
- Luis Bermejo
- Claudia Traisac as Juana Juárez
- Urko Olazábal as Teresa's father
- Julia de Castro

== Production ==
The screenplay is an adaptation of Juan Mayorga's play La lengua en pedazos, which was in turn developed by Mayorga upon bits of Teresa of Ávila's El libro de la vida, written by the mystic toward 1588. The film was produced by Bluebird Films, Inicia Films, and La Lengua en Pedazos AIE alongside Nu Boyana Portugal, and it had the participation of RTVE, Orange and Aragón TV and funding from ICAA and ICEC. Shooting locations included Jaca.

== Release ==
The film screened out of competition at the 68th Valladolid International Film Festival (Seminci) on 23 October 2023. It also made it to the official selection competition of the Tallinn Black Nights Film Festival (PÖFF) for its international premiere. Distributed by BTeam Pictures, the film was released theatrically in Spain on 24 November 2023.

== Reception ==
=== Top ten lists ===
The film appeared on a number of critics' top ten lists of the best Spanish films of 2023:

- 6th — El Confidencial (consensus)

== Accolades ==
Year	Award	Category	Nominee(s)	Result	Ref.
2023	29th Forqué Awards	Best Actress in a Film	Blanca Portillo	Nominated	
2024	11th Feroz Awards	'Arrebato' Special Award (Fiction)		Nominated	
2024	79th CEC Medals	Best Adapted Screenplay	Paula Ortiz, Javier García Arredondo	Nominated	
2024	79th CEC Medals	Best Actress	Blanca Portillo	Nominated	
2024	32nd Actors and Actresses Union Awards	Best Film Actress in a Minor Role	Greta Fernández	Nominated	

== See also ==
- List of Spanish films of 2023
