= How to Become a Modern Man =

- Theatrical release poster
- Spanish: Como Dios manda
- Directed by: Paz Jiménez
- Screenplay by: Marta Sánchez
- Produced by: Mercedes Gamero; Gonzalo Bendala; Marta Velasco
- Starring: Leo Harlem; María Morales; Daniel Pérez Prada; Stéphanie Magnin; Maribel Salas; Julián Villagrán; Mariola Fuentes
- Cinematography: Eva Díaz
- Edited by: Antonio Frutos
- Music by: Miguel Rivera
- Production companies: Atresmedia Cine; Áralan Films; Como Dios manda la película AIE
- Distributed by: Warner Bros. Pictures España
- Release dates: 18 March 2023 (Málaga); 2 June 2023 (Spain)
- Country: Spain
- Language: Spanish
- Box office: €2.1 million

How to Become a Modern Man (Spanish: Como Dios manda, lit. 'As God Commands') is a 2023 Spanish comedy film directed by Paz Jiménez from a screenplay by Marta Sánchez which stars Leo Harlem alongside María Morales, Daniel Pérez Prada, and Stéphanie Magnin.

== Plot ==
The plot follows Andrés Cuadrado, an averagely racist, machista and LGBT-phobic "man of order" demoted from his longtime post as a civil servant in the Ministry of Finance to the Ministry of Equality as a punishment for his bigoted behaviour, thereby grappling with a more diverse working environment under new boss Lourdes and undergoing a re-education in values.

== Cast ==
- Leo Harlem as Andrés Cuadrado
- María Morales as Lourdes
- Daniel Pérez Prada as Martín
- Stéphanie Magnin as Ana
- Maribel Salas as Nati
- Julián Villagrán as Víctor
- Mariola Fuentes
- Santiago Ugalde
- Pepín Tre

== Production ==
The film is an Atresmedia Cine, Áralan Films, and Como Dios manda la película AIE production. Filming locations included Seville and Málaga.

== Release ==
The film was presented on 18 March 2023 at the 26th Málaga Film Festival, screening out of competition as the festival's closing film. Distributed by Warner Bros. Pictures España, it was released theatrically in Spain on 2 June 2023.

== Reception ==
Javier Ocaña of Cinemanía rated the film 2½ stars, considering that while it is dragged in its beginnings by a "stale mise-en-scène", a "more dynamic direction boosted by the good vibes and the (foregone) redemption arc", leaves a smile [on your face] in the last stretch.

Manuel J. Lombardo of Diario de Sevilla rated the film 2 out of 5 stars, considering that "the sociological satire is deflated and padded in favor of good intentions, bemused morals and the family discourse".

Ekaitz Ortega of HobbyConsolas rated the film with 42 points ('bad'), deeming it to be "a film that seeks to learn and laugh at different perspectives of society, from the traditional to the more progressive", but remains a range of stereotypes.

== Accolades ==
Year	Award	Category	Nominee(s)	Result	Ref.
2024	3rd Carmen Awards	Best New Director	Paz Jiménez Díaz	Nominated	
2024	3rd Carmen Awards	Best Supporting Actor	Julián Villagrán	Nominated	
2024	3rd Carmen Awards	Best Original Score	Miguel Rivera	Nominated	
2024	3rd Carmen Awards	Best Production Supervision	Sandra Rodríguez	Nominated	
2024	3rd Carmen Awards	Best Original Song	"Soy como soy" by Miguel Rivera	Won	
2024	3rd Carmen Awards	Best Sound	Antuán Mejías, Jorge Marín	Nominated	
2024	3rd Carmen Awards	Best Makeup and Hairstyles	Rafael Mora, Anabel Beato	Nominated	

== See also ==
- List of Spanish films of 2023
