= Zack Gómez =

Spanish actor

- Gómez-Rolls in 2026
- Born: 14 March 1995 (age 31); Madrid, Spain
- Occupations: Actor; singer
- Years active: 2013–present

Zack Gómez (born 14 March 1995) is a Spanish actor and singer, known for his roles as Alex Castro in Bajo la rosa and Cristian in Heridas.

== Biography ==
Zack Gómez came out as a trans man at the age of 13, when he decided to tell his parents. It was not until several years later that he decided to publicly express his identify.

=== Career ===
In 2020, Zack Gómez rose to fame after starring in the theatrical work Transformación, directed by Paloma Pedrero, and took place in the Theatre of Maria Guerrero. In 2021 he released the single "Villain Boy", a rap song that sought to visualize the realities of trans people through music. That same year, he starred in the horror short film Hotel Malángel.

In 2022 he formed part of the main cast of the Atresmedia show Heridas, playing the role of Cristian. That same year, he started to work on the filming of the dramatic short film Transición, by David Velduque, being part of the cast.

In 2026 he played the main character the film 9 Moons (Spanish: 9 lunas) about a transgender man who becomes pregnant.

== Filmography ==
=== Film ===
Year	Title	Role	Notes
2013	Media	E	Short film
2016	#Eurodrama	Miki	Short film
2017	Bajo la rosa	Alex Castro	Movie
2020	La visita	Adrián	Short film
2021	Hotel Malángel		Short film
2023	Transición		Short film
2026	9 Moons	Ángel	Movie

=== Television ===
Year	Title	Role	Notes
2015	Centro médico		1 episode
2020	Amar es para siempre	Jonathan	11 episodes
2020	Por H o por B	El Pilas	1 episode
2022	Heridas	Cristian	9 episodes
2022	Vampire Academy	Tunnel Dhampir	1 episode
2025	Mariliendre	Javi	1 episode
