= Heridas =

Spanish television series

- Also known as: Wounds; Madre
- Genre: Drama
- Based on: Mother by: Yûji Sakamoto; Berfu Ergenekon
- Written by: Lele Portas, Marco Tulio Socorro
- Screenplay by: Eduardo Galdo; Lele Portas; Marco Tulio Socorro; Joana Ortueta; Humberto Ortega; Natalia García Prieto
- Directed by: Tito López Amado; Juanma R. Pachón
- Starring: Adriana Ugarte; María León; Cosette Silguero; Javier Collado; Xoán Fórneas
- Country of origin: Spain
- Original language: Spanish
- No. of seasons: 1
- No. of episodes: 13

Production
- Executive producers: Montse García; Sonia Martínez; Eduardo Galdo
- Running time: 50 minutes
- Production company: Buendía Estudios

Original release
- Network: Atresplayer Premium
- Release: 17 April 2022

Heridas (English: Wounds) is a Spanish TV drama series of 13 episodes. It is directed by Norberto López Amado and Juanma R. Pachón. It was written by Lele Portas and Marco Tulio Socorro based on Yûji Sakamoto's work on Japanese TV series Mother (2010) and its Turkish adaptation Anne (2017) written by Berfu Ergenekon. Heridas is produced by Buendía Estudios. Some early episodes were previewed at the Málaga Film Festival on 20 March 2022. The entire series premiered on Spanish TV channel Antena 3 and streaming service Atresplayer Premium on 17 April 2022. It was filmed at Spanish locations in Cádiz, Tarifa, Cabo de Gata, Madrid, Guadalajara and Toledo. The series centres on wild-life photographer Manuela (Adriana Ugarte) and her interaction with Alba (Cosette Silguero), seven-year-old daughter of Yolanda (María León) and stepdaughter of Lucho (Javier Collado).

== Plot ==
Manuela lives alone in a cabin which borders the Andalusian wetlands. She photographs local and migratory birds for a magazine. In nearby Almería lives Alba, a seven-year-old school girl who rarely eats breakfast. Her mother Yolanda works as a pole dancer and sleeps during the day. Yolanda's unemployed boyfriend Lucho is uninterested in Alba's care. The home is disorganised and Alba is left to fend for herself. Lucho is physically and emotionally abusive to Yolanda and Alba. After Manuela meets Alba, they begin a relationship, which results in Manuela facing her past traumas. Alba disappears, initially presumed drowned, before Yolanda and Lucho are investigated for neglect and abuse. Manuela kidnaps Alba to save her from further abuse and raises her as Paloma.

== Cast and characters ==
Credits:

- Adriana Ugarte as Manuela León Escudero: wild-life photographer, cafe worker.
  - Lucía Caraballo as Manuela (18 years old): rebellious teen, Héctor's girlfriend.
  - Allegra Rabaneda as Manuela (5–7 years old): child, raised by Olga and Jaime as their eldest daughter.
- María León as Yolanda Romero: pole dancer, Alba's mother.
- Cosette Silguero as Alba Romero / Paloma León: Yolanda's daughter who disappears. Owned pet rat, Lucy. Kidnapped by Manuela, renamed Poloma.
- Javier Collado as Luis "Lucho" Valdivia: Yolanda's wastrel, abusive boyfriend. Becomes security guard and drug dealer.
- Xoán Fórneas as Fabio Sierra: investigative news journalist, covers Alba's disappearance.
- Elisabet Gelabert as Rocío Durán Hidalgo: Manuela's birth mother, jailed until 2013 for killing husband. While imprisoned she placed Manuela with her friend Olga. Becomes a seamstress.
- Pau Durà as Jaime León: Private school principal, Manuela's adoptive father.
- Sonia Almarcha as Olga Escudero: Pharmacist, Manuela's adoptive mother.
- Maggie Garcia as Alejandra: Manuela's youngest adoptive sister.
- Natalia Huarte as Maite León Escudero: school teacher, Manuela's younger adoptive sister.
- Iván Marcos as Héctor Ibánez: Madrid police inspector, Jaime's friend.
  - Rafa Álamos as Héctor (20 years old): Manuela's boyfriend.
- Zack Gomez as Cristian: hairdresser, Ramón's boyfriend.
- Clara Garrido as Violeta: school teacher, Maite's friend, Héctor's wife.
- Violeta Pérez as Figueras: Madrid policewoman, works for Héctor.
- Victoria Mora as Pura Vecina: Rocío's neighbour, looked after Paloma.
- Rubén de Eguia as Ramón: Lucho's cousin, Cristian's boyfriend.
- Laura Minguell as Gloria: photojournalist, works with Fabio.
- Anna Azcona as Amparo Santos: Rocío's fellow ex-prisoner.
- Fátima Baeza as Carmen: Alba's teacher.
- Samuel Viyuela as Antonio "Toño" Santos: Amparo's son, truck driver.
- Arantxa Zambrano as Susana: Almería policewoman investigating Alba's disappearance.
- Aníbal Soto as Pepe: owns Almería cafe, Manuela's boss.
- Javier Lago as Inspector Gormaz: Almería policeman, Susana's boss, investigates Alba's disappearance.
- Mar Vidal as Rosa: servant at Leóns' household.

== Production ==
Spanish website VerTele!'s Marcos Méndez reported in January 2021 that Atresmedia would adapt the Turkish drama TV series Anne (2017), which itself is an adaptation of the Japanese series Mother (2010) via Buendía Estudios for Antena 3 and Atresplayer Premium – the project's working title was Madre while in the script phase. In May of that year, Adriana Ugarte (of The Time in Between, 2013–2014) and María León were announced as the adult lead roles. Filming began on 22 June 2021 under the title Heridas (English: Wounds), and used Spanish locations in Cádiz, Tarifa, Cabo de Gata, Madrid, Guadalajara and Toledo. In March 2022 executive producer Montse García told FormulaTV's Alejandro Rodera that Heridas would only run for a single season.

== Episodes ==
No. in season	Title	Directed by	Written by	Original release date
1	"Episode 1" (Capítulo 1)	Norberto López Amado	Yûji Sakamoto, Lele Portas, Marco Tulio Socorro	17 April 2022
Alba approaches breakwater. Police search for Alba. Yolanda identifies Alba's coat. Four days earlier: Manuela photographs wetlands. Fabio arrives unannounced but Maneula too busy. Alba rebuffed by Yolanda over braiding hair. Alba inadvertently wakes Lucho. Manuela sees Alba throw message bottle from breakwater. Manuela meets Alba with pet Lucy. Manuela declines Alejandra and Olga's invitation to Jaime's award ceremony. Lucho rails at Alba over Lucy. Maite asks family why Manuela excludes herself. Carmen takes Alba's group on wetlands excursion. Manuela catches Alba fainting from hunger. Manuela notices Alba's bruising. Manuela delivers Alba home; Yolanda: mind your own business. Susana questions Alba, who defends Yolanda. Yolanda sends drunken Lucho home. Manuela shows Fabio flamingoes fleeing predators. Lucho leaves Alba in garbage bag for silence. Carmen to Susana: drawings of Alba crying. Yolanda berates Manuela after feeding Alba. Manuela and Fabio kiss. Alba disbelieves Yolanda's explanation for Lucy's death. Manuela reads Alba's diary. Lucho puts makeup on Alba. Yolanda and Lucho drive away for overnight. Manuela discovers Alba in garbage bag alongside roadside dump. Manuela and Alba read Alba's message bottle. Manuela decides to save Alba. Yolanda and Lucho return home: Alba's gone. Present: Manuela and Alba board Madrid bus. 2013: Rocío released from prison.
2	"Episode 2" (Capítulo 2)	Norberto López Amado	Yûji Sakamoto, Lele Portas, Marco Tulio Socorro	24 April 2022
Manuela and Alba aboard bus. Manuela remembers selling her car to finance relocation. Manuela tells Alba: Rocío left when Manuela was five. Flashback: Teen Manuela leaves Olga without explanation; Héctor races after departing taxi. Present: They arrive in Madrid. Police searching for Alba. Yolanda returns home. Initial press speculation is Alba drowned. Yolanda claims Alba left by herself. Police blame Yolanda's poor supervision for Alba's disappearance. Manuela and Alba have lunch. Alejandra arrives at Manuela's cabin. Fabio overhears Alejandra finding out that Manuela quit her job and left Almería. Manuela's purse's stolen. Olga to Jaime: Manuela's in Madrid. Manuela sells camera; books cheap room. Lucho and Yolanda tell press they want Alba back. Alba cuts hair off to become Paloma. Manuela goes out to buy dinner. Yolanda leaves work to see Alba's tribute site. Lázaro enters unlocked toilet, talks to Paloma. Manuela arrives; accosts Lázaro for being with Paloma. Manager kicks Manuela out for accusing Lázaro. Manuela phones Alejandra for money. Manuela and Paloma go to underground station. Paloma gets onboard departing train. Manuela collects Paloma at next station. Fabio transcribes Yolanda and Carmen's argument about lack of care for Alba. Manuela considers handing Paloma to police.
3	"Episode 3" (Capítulo 3)	Norberto López Amado	Yûji Sakamoto, Lele Portas, Marco Tulio Socorro	1 May 2022
Paloma convinces Manuela not to enter police station. Fabio looks for evidence that Alba was neglected by parents. Rocío diagnosed with terminal illness. Fabio records Yolanda and Lucho arguing over Alba. Alejandra, back in Madrid, helps Maite organise Jaime's ceremony. Alejandra messages Manuela: meet at school. Rocío reminisces about young Manuela. Flashback: Olga notices Rocío's bruises. Later: Olga visits Rocío in prison. Rocío asks Olga to adopt Manuela. Present: Manuela and Paloma at school. Flashback: teen Manuela and Héctor graffiti wall. Earlier: child Manuela unofficially adopted by Olga and Jaime. Present: Rocío asks Olga about Manuela. Olga shows Manuela's photo. Rocío walks past Manuela, sees her tell Paloma: return to library. Manuela enters building; catches Olga's eye. Paloma and Rocío meet. Manuela borrows Olga's money. Manuela bumps into Héctor. When Manuela collects Paloma she meets but does not recognise Rocío. Manuela and Paloma book hotel room. Rocío opens her shop. Fabio interviews Carmen about Alba's parents. Lucho wants to depart Almería. Manuela leaves Paloma at hotel; goes to magazine office. Susana arrests Yolanda and Lucho. Paloma sees Rocío outside and follows her to shop. Manuela suspicious when seeing Paloma and Rocío together. Fabio phones Manuela: take Alba's message bottle to police.
4	"Episode 4" (Capítulo 4)	Juanma R. Pachón	Yûji Sakamoto, Lele Portas, Marco Tulio Socorro	8 May 2022
Maite and Violeta visit Manuela unannounced. They meet Paloma, who Manuela introduces as Sandra's daughter. Paloma listens as Maite and Manuela argue about Manuela's treatment of their parents. Maite: you insulted our parents. Manuela phones Olga to apologise. Police question Yolanda and Lucho about Alba's abuses. Lucho: Yolanda wanted to party; she put Alba in garbage bag. Fabio to Susana: Manuela not responding. Gormaz asks Manuela to make police statement. Héctor asks Figueras to research Manuela. Jaime berates Olga for not telling him about Rocío. Manuela phones Rocío to look after Paloma. At courthouse Gormaz interviews Manuela about Alba's welfare. She does not want Yolanda harmed. Rocío takes Paloma to hospital for fever. Fabio and Gloria want to interview Yolanda when she leaves police custody. At hotel Alejandra meets Paloma and Rocío. Manuela ignores Fabio's calls. Fabio asks Yolanda to tell her story. Lucho gets angry. Manuela reminisces to Rocío about not knowing her birth mother. Alejandra tells Jaime where Rocío's staying. Jaime sees Paloma, Manuela and Rocío. Jaime orders Rocío: leave Manuela alone. Jaime asks Manuela and Paloma to stay at family's home. Rocío hears news, realises Paloma's Alba. Fabio returns to Madrid. Manuela to family: Paloma's my daughter.
5	"Episode 5" (Capítulo 5)	Norberto López Amado	Yûji Sakamoto, Lele Portas, Marco Tulio Socorro	15 May 2022
Manuela apologises to León family for not telling them about Paloma. Fabio requests Alejandra to see Manuela. Maite asks who's Paloma's father. Lucho and Yolanda arrive in Madrid to stay with Ramón. They meet Cristian. Manuela hears Leóns argue about her story. Flashback: Jaime had sex with teen Manuela. Present: Yolanda tries to appease Lucho. Manuela tells Alejandra to ignore Fabio – her ex-boyfriend. Olga to Manuela: no more secrets. Leóns invite Héctor to barbecue. Rocío reads newspapers. Lucho pressures Yolanda to audition for Madrid club. Héctor asks Jaime about Paloma; then quizzes Paloma. Manuela to Paloma: Héctor's police. Jaime checks Paloma's photo with child Manuela. Manuela leaves Paloma with Rocío, to attend job interview. Paloma learns Rocío knows she's Alba. Rocío supports Manuela's explanation for Alba's abduction. Manuela and Paloma return home. Jaime wants Paloma at his school. Yolanda refuses club audition. Fabio learns Manuela has a daughter, Paloma. Fabio informs Carmen. Manuela tells Héctor: Paloma's not his daughter. Jaime needs Paloma's official documents to enrol her. Manuela asks Rocío for help with forging documentation. Figueras to Héctor: Manuela testified in Alba case. Paloma finds photo of Rocío holding child Manuela. Manuela realises Rocío's her mother; Manuela leaves.
6	"Episode 6" (Capítulo 6)	Norberto López Amado	Yûji Sakamoto, Lele Portas, Marco Tulio Socorro	22 May 2022
Flashback: Rocío buys fairy floss for Manuela. Rocío leaves with police guards. Present: Rocío phones Amparo. Jaime buys camera for Paloma. Flashback: Jaime teaches Manuela photography. Jaime convinces Olga not to tell Manuela about Rocío. Present: Manuela tells Olga: met Rocío. Amparo organises documentation without charging Rocío. Paloma photographs Leóns. Manuela confronts Fabio: leave me alone. Lucho abuses Yolanda, kicks her out. Manuela receives forged documents via Amparo. Manuela to Rocío: payment for documents. Rocío: do not want money. Rocío faints, Manuela takes Rocío to hospital, phones Olga to coordinate medical care. Héctor asks Gormaz: could Alba be alive? Gormaz: No, witness saw Alba fall into water. Violeta to Héctor: birthdate does not match; you cannot be Paloma's father. Olga consoles Rocío. Yolanda reads Alba's diary: Manuela's phone number. Flashback: Teen Manuela raped by Jaime. Present: Manuela rages from memory. Olga tells Manuela: reconcile with Rocío. Cristian helps Yolanda recover from Lucho's beating. Flashback: Teen Manuela and Sandra leave for dance. Sandra returns with completely drunk Manuela. Jaime puts her on bed, undresses her. Manuela wakes feeling violated, remembers being raped. Present: Jaime: never happened, imagining it. Manuela: leave Paloma alone. Paloma answers Manuela's phone, its Yolanda: recognises Alba.
7	"Episode 7" (Capítulo 7)	Juanma R. Pachón	Yûji Sakamoto, Lele Portas, Marco Tulio Socorro	29 May 2022
Fabio scolds someone for disbelieving him. Driver runs Fabio down. Hours earlier: Olga asks Paloma: why say mummy? Olga hears Yolanda: where's Alba? Manuela arrives, takes Paloma. Cristian believe Yolanda heard Alba. Manuela packs bags, explains situation to Leóns. Yolanda returns to Ramón's flat. Lucho: cannot contact police; Alba's dead, forget Alba, live good life here. Jaime convinces Paloma to save Manuela by leaving. Olga to Manuela: take Paloma to police. Paloma pretends to sleep. Olga and Jaime argue over supporting Manuela. Paloma leaves goodbye letter. Olga and Manuela look for Paloma. Yolanda phones Fabio: Alba did not drown. Manuela uses Olga's phone to call Rocío for help. Manuela returns to Rocío's shop and flat. Rocío leaves hospital joins up with Manuela. Yolanda gives Fabio the number: he recognises its Manuela's. Fabio: I will find owner. Rocío to Manuela: where does Paloma feel safe? Manuela finds Paloma at bus stop. Olga to Manuela: stay with Rocío. Alejandra berates Jaime for not helping Manuela. Alejandra knows Manuela was adopted. Manuela and Paloma leave. Fabio follows Manuela and Paloma to Rocío's. Fabio threatens to expose Manuela as Alba's kidnapper. Manuela tries to explain but Fabio pushes her away. Rocío runs Fabio down.
8	"Episode 8" (Capítulo 8)	Juanma R. Pachón	Yûji Sakamoto, Lele Portas, Marco Tulio Socorro	5 June 2022
Fabio is seriously injured. Rocío to Manuela: no police, no ambulance; you will be arrested. They put Fabio in the car. Rocío drops Manuela at her buildaing. Manuela puts Paloma to sleep at Pura's flat. Rocío and Manuela tie up Fabio in Rocío's shop, tend his wounds. Rocío to Manuella: killed your father, imprisoned for 12 years. Manuela cries, Paloma consoles her; they return to Rocío's flat. Alejandra argues with Maite and Olga, wants to know if Manuela's alright. Maite: police track phone calls. Alejandra: no police yet. Yolanda plays Fabio's phone message for Cristian. Gloria reports Fabio's disappearance to Figueras and Héctor. Fabio deduces Rocío is Manuella's mother. Fabio knocks Rocío down to escape but Manuela hits Fabio. Olga arrives, treats Fabio. Rocío asks Amparo to assist Manuela's escape. Paloma talks to Fabio; gives him Alba's message bottle; begs him: let her stay with Manuela. Fabio agrees with Paloma. When Manuela arrives Fabio promises to help them. Police arrest Lucho; but release him when they learn Fabio's at hospital. Police question Fabio; he feigns amnesia. Manuela asks Rocío to come with them. Héctor searches Fabio's phone: hears Yolanda's message; sees photos of Manuela with Paloma and Alba's photo.
9	"Episode 9" (Capítulo 9)	Norberto López Amado	Yûji Sakamoto, Lele Portas, Marco Tulio Socorro	12 June 2022
Flashback: Teen Yolanda learns she's pregnant; her boyfriend's left. Yolanda works while raising Alba. Present: Yolanda borrows Cristian's car. Héctor searches for Manuela; asks Figueras to have Fabio tailed. Fabio evades police at hospital. Héctor: arrest Fabio. Yolanda follows Fabio to Rocío's shop. Olga sees Héctor questioning Pura. Manuela, Paloma, Rocío and Fabio sneak out of building into Amparo's van. Yolanda follows van. Héctor orders Manuela arrested, search warrants for Rocío's flat and shop. Jaime tells Héctor they believed Paloma was Manuela's daughter but discovered she is Alba. Van arrives at Amparo's farm. Héctor questions Olga and Jaime about Rocío. Both indicate Manuela did not know Rocío until recently. Yolanda finds Alba, knocks Rocío down. Manuela arrives. Paloma tells Yolanda: no longer her daughter. Héctor questions Leóns about Fabio; Alejandra met him in Almería. Manuela convinces Yolanda to forsake Alba. Héctor informs Jaime they are being surveilled. Manuela tells Paloma that Yolanda left, will not report them. Yolanda returns to Ramón's flat; tells Lucho that Alba left willingly. As Yolanda leaves Lucho, police arrest her. Héctor asks Yolanda: help find Alba. Héctor shows Jaime CCTV of Olga at Rocío's shop. Jaime betrays Rocío. Manuela's truck is stopped by police.
10	"Episode 10" (Capítulo 10)	Norberto López Amado	Yûji Sakamoto, Lele Portas, Marco Tulio Socorro	19 June 2022
Héctor searches for Amparo's van described by Yolanda. Olga and Jaime argue because Jaime told Héctor about Rocío's ex-prisoner contact. Héctor interviews Yolanda, who defends giving up Alba. Lucho and Cristian fight over Lucho betraying Yolanda to police. Ramón throws Lucho out of his flat due to fight with Cristian. Amparo's truck arrives at stopover. On TV Héctor announces Manuela as Alba's kidnapper. Flashback: teen Manuela and Héctor start dating. Present: Fabio and Manuela discuss going to police. Héctor obtains list of Rocío's cellmates. Amparo orders Toño to organise truck onto ferry to Algiers. Héctor questions Amparo, searches her scrap yard; van already crushed. Héctor's police discover Toño and truck on CCTV. Truck found at Tarifa 's port. Toño's truck arrives at compound; group disembarks. Amparo orders Toño to group on ferry, now. Héctor arrives at Tarifa. Flashback: teen Manuela and Héctor plan trip to Morocco. Present: Amparo's arrested, Toño leaves group at compound. Fabio asks locals for exit. Flashback: Manuela tells OLga she's going to Argentina, breaks up with Héctor. Present: Fabio organised trip to Tangier. Rocío faints, no more medication; Manuela fulfils Rocío's prescription. Héctor arrests Manuela; police collect Rocío, Fabio and Alba. Manuela hugs Alba.
11	"Episode 11" (Capítulo 11)	Juanma R. Pachón	Yûji Sakamoto, Lele Portas, Marco Tulio Socorro	26 June 2022
At Madrid police station, Lucho threatens Manuela. Manuela, Rocío and Fabio are processed. Figueras to Yolanda: cannot take Alba until social services approves. Yolanda leaves with Cristian and Ramón. Rocío takes blame for Fabio's injury and abduction. Fabio supports Rocío's version. Rocío faints during Héctor's interview. Héctor tells Manuela she manipulated Rocío and Fabio. Olga blames Jaime for Manuela's imprisonment. Manuela attends court. Yolanda reads out Alba's message. Manuela: found Alba in garbage bag. Fabio: Alba abandoned by Yolanda. Yolanda: Alba brainwashed. Manuela indicted to stand trial; Fabio paroled; Yolanda released. Alba stays with social services. Yolanda promises Alba: better care. Yolanda works for Cristian. Olga and Alejandra visit Manuela in prison; she's been bashed. Yolanda works evenings as carer. Lucho employed as security guard. Alba might be fostered. Lucho bribes Yolanda to take him back. Yolanda and Alba enter flat; Lucho's there. Yolanda promises Alba that Lucho changed. Lucho organises drug dealers. Manuela bailed, goes to Leóns; Rocío's there. Manuela takes Rocío back to flat. Héctor to Manuela: Alba's with Yolanda. Manuela to Héctor: ask Jaime why she left him. Lucho catches Alba using calling Manuela. Lucho coerces Alba into taking drugs to school so she will visit Manuela.
12	"Episode 12" (Capítulo 12)	Norberto López Amado, Juanma R. Pachón	Yûji Sakamoto, Lele Portas, Marco Tulio Socorro	3 July 2022
Alba sleeps between Yolanda and Manuela. Days earlier: Alba makes Mother's Day card. Manuela discovers Alba's school, tries to see her but Yolanda spots Manuela. Lucho makes Alba take drugs to school. Lucho refuses to let Alba visit Manuela. Jaime does not answer Héctor about Manuela leaving for Argentina. Alba abscods from school. Flashback: Rocío and Manuela cook. Present: prepare same meal. Alba visits Manuela: gives card, presents. Yolanda learns Alba missed classes. Alba: went to Manuela. Yolanda believes Alba visited Manuela when missing other days. Alba gives Yolanda card, presents. Manuela celebrates day with Rocío, Olga, Fabio, Alejandra and Ampara. Maite stays with Jaime. Rocío dies. Lucho threatens Alba. Yolanda finds drugs in Alba's bag; learns Lucho used Alba as courier. Yolanda accuses Lucho; he denies it. Alba hides under bed. Yolanda tries to call police but Lucho beats her. Olga tells Manuela about deal with Rocío. Flashback: Manuela raped by Jaime. Present: Manuela asks Jaime for photo negatives, why he disallowed visiting Rocío, why Jaime raped her? Jaime to Olga: Manuela was drunk, drugged; she's confused. Olga left speechless. Yolanda and Alba escape to Manuela; cannot call police Yolanda would lose custody. Lucho throws rock through Manuela's window.
13	"Episode 13" (Capítulo 13)	Norberto López Amado	Yûji Sakamoto, Lele Portas, Marco Tulio Socorro	10 July 2022
Lucho hides below Manuela's window. Pura calls police. Hours earlier: Lucho wakes, looks for Yolanda. Lucho asks for Yolanda at Ramón's place. Yolanda ignores Lucho's calls. Manuela tells Alba and Yolanda that Rocío died. Lucho finds Manuela's address, threatens Yolanda but leaves upon hearing police sirens. Lucho goes to workplace, collects drugs but stopped by fellow guard. Lucho disarms, shoots guard dead. Other guard sees Lucho running with gun, finds corpse. Other guard shoots Lucho, who limps to car. Lucho takes drugs. Alejandra believes Manuela but Maite supports Jaime. Héctor phones Yolanda: Lucho wanted for murder, report to station. Lucho arrives with gun threatens Yolanda, Manuela and Alba. Manuela treats Lucho's bullet hole. Fabio arrives at Manuela's; Pura tells him Lucho took them. Fabio informs Héctor. Maite gets school's backup disc: finds Jaime's child pornography cache. Lucho forces Manuela to drive them away. Lucho takes them hostage in rural house. Maite shows photos to Olga and Alejandra. Jaime arrives home, sees their faces; leaves. Lucho takes Manuela outside, at gunpoint. Alba unties Yolanda. Lucho shoots Fabio. Manuela struggles with Lucho, drops gun. Yolanda picks it up, kills Lucho. Jaime jumps off bridge. Manuela, Alba and Yolanda live together.
