= Francesc Escribano =

Catalan journalist, writer, and producer

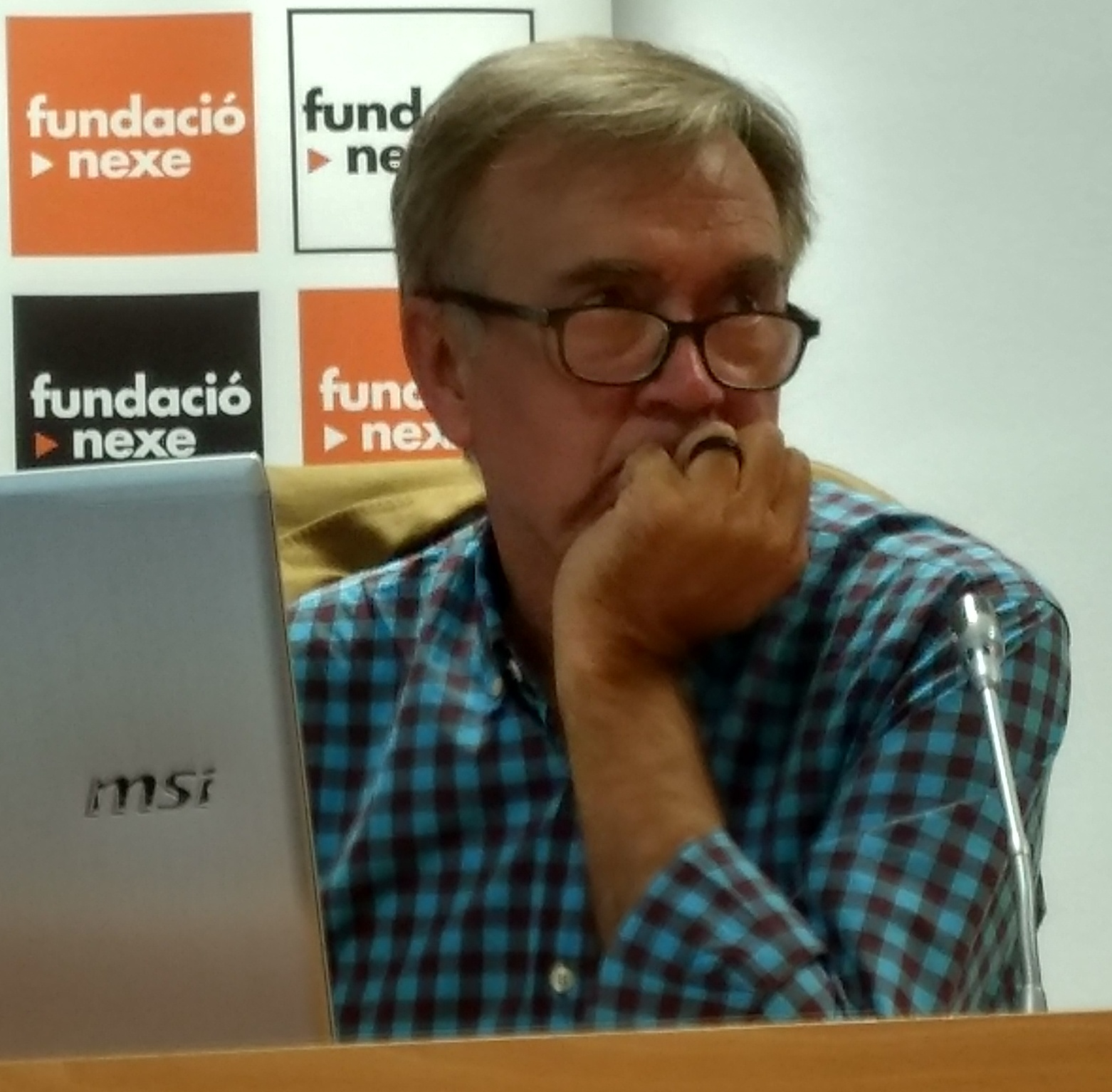
- Born: Francesc Escribano i Royo; 9 April 1958 (age 68); Vilanova i la Geltrú, Spain
- Education: Autonomous University of Barcelona
- Occupations: Journalist; writer; producer

Francesc Escribano i Royo (born 9 April 1958) is a Catalan journalist, writer, and audiovisual producer.

Born in Vilanova i la Geltrú, El Garraf, he earned a licentiate degree in Information Sciences (Journalism) from the Autonomous University of Barcelona. He joined TVE in 1982 and two years later, in 1984, TV3's newcast services. He was a member of the board of the International Academy of Television Arts and Sciences. From 2004 to 2008 he served as the director of Catalan public broadcaster Televisió de Catalunya. In 2008 he joined Vértice360's Notro TV at the helm of the television branch of 'Content'. In 2009, he joined the newly created production company Minoria Absoluta in the position of director.

His published books include Compte enrere. La història de Salvador Puig Antich (the basis of the 2006 film Salvador), Descalç sobre la terra vermella (the basis of the 2014 miniseries Descalç sobre la terra vermella) and Desenterrant el silenci: Antoni Benaiges, el mestre que va prometre el mar (the basis of the 2023 film The Teacher Who Promised the Sea).
