= The Wait (2023 film) =

- Film poster
- Spanish: La espera
- Directed by: F. Javier Gutiérrez
- Screenplay by: F. Javier Gutiérrez
- Produced by: Antonio P. Pérez
- Starring: Víctor Clavijo; Ruth Díaz; Moisés Ruiz; Pedro Casablanc; Manuel Morón; Antonio Estrada; Luis Callejo
- Cinematography: Miguel Ángel Mora
- Edited by: F. Javier Gutiérrez
- Music by: Zeltia Montes
- Production companies: Spal Films; Nostromo Pictures; Unfiled Films
- Release dates: 14 September 2023 (Oldenburg); 15 December 2023 (Spain)
- Country: Spain
- Language: Spanish

The Wait (Spanish: La espera) is a 2023 Spanish fantasy horror thriller film directed and written by F. Javier Gutiérrez which stars Víctor Clavijo and Ruth Díaz.

== Plot ==
Set in the Andalusian countryside, the plot follows a gamekeeper's personal nightmare after enduring the tragic loss of his family.

== Cast ==
- Víctor Clavijo as Eladio
- Ruth Díaz as Marcia
- Manuel Morón as Don Francisco
- Moisés Ruiz as Floren
- Pedro Casablanc
- Antonio Estrada
- Luis Callejo

== Production ==
The film was produced by Spal Films alongside Nostromo Pictures and Unfiled Films, with the participation of Canal Sur and backing from Junta de Andalucía. Shooting locations included the province of Seville.

== Release ==
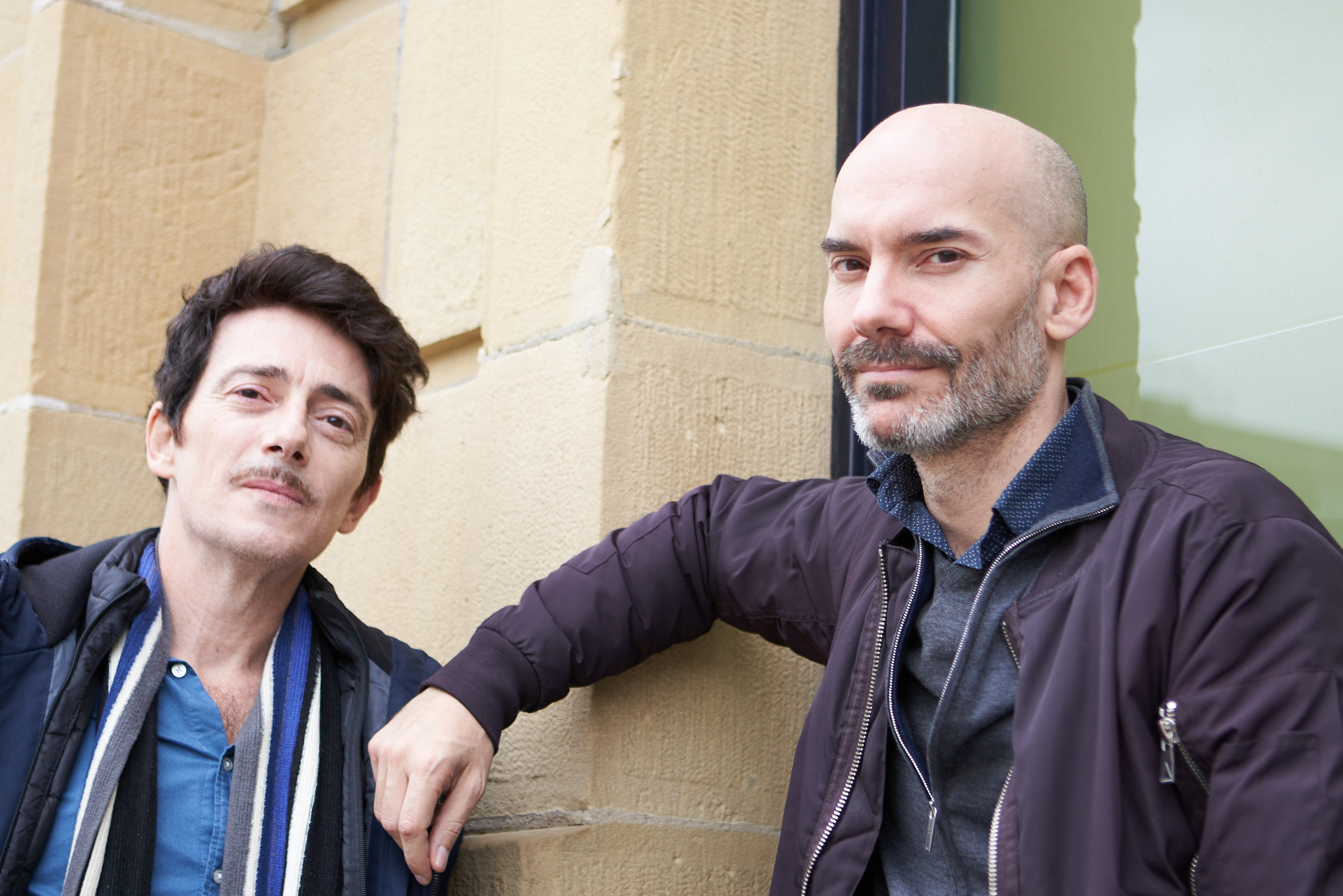
Clavijo and Gutiérrez during the presentation of the film at the 2023 San Sebastian Horror and Fantasy Film Festival

Film Factory boarded international rights to the film. The film was programmed to have its world premiere at the 30th Oldenburg International Film Festival on 14 September 2023. It was also picked up for screenings at the Fantastic Fest and the 56th Sitges Film Festival. It made it to the 2023 Vancouver International Film Festival slate for its Canadian premiere. It was released theatrically in Spain on 15 December 2023. Film Movement acquired North-American distribution rights to the film.

== Reception ==
On the review aggregator website Rotten Tomatoes, 86% of 22 critics' reviews are positive, with an average rating of 6.7/10.

Jordan Mintzer of The Hollywood Reporter underscored as a bottom line "solid technique in search of a sturdier story".

Reviewing for UPI, Fred Topel deemed the film to be "a western with universal themes that are still relevant in modern day", with the tragedy befalling its protagonist being "engrossing and hopefully cautionary".

Ricardo Rosado of Fotogramas described the film as a The Holy Innocents vendetta embracing the madness of Mandy, with an award-bound Clavijo finally getting the screentime and role he deserves.

== Accolades ==
Year	Award	Category	Nominee(s)	Result	Ref.
2024	3rd Carmen Awards	Best Film		Nominated	
2024	3rd Carmen Awards	Best Director	F. Javier Gutiérrez	Nominated	
2024	3rd Carmen Awards	Best Original Screenplay	F. Javier Gutiérrez	Nominated	
2024	3rd Carmen Awards	Best Actor	Víctor Clavijo	Won	
2024	3rd Carmen Awards	Best Supporting Actor	Manuel Morón	Nominated	
2024	3rd Carmen Awards	Best Supporting Actor	Pedro Casablanc	Nominated	
2024	3rd Carmen Awards	Best New Actor	Antonio Estrada	Won	
2024	3rd Carmen Awards	Best Editing	F. Javier Gutiérrez	Nominated	
2024	3rd Carmen Awards	Best Art Direction	Yoyi Mauriño, F. Javier Gutiérrez	Nominated	
2024	3rd Carmen Awards	Best Costume Design	Consuelo Bahamonde, Andrea Escudero	Won	
2024	3rd Carmen Awards	Best Special Effects	Joaquín Ortega	Nominated	
2025	29th Satellite Awards	Best Motion Picture — International		Pending	

== See also ==
- List of Spanish films of 2023
