= Tobacco Barns (film) =

- Theatrical release poster
- Spanish: Secaderos
- Directed by: Rocío Mesa
- Written by: Rocío Mesa
- Produced by: Olmo Figueredo González-Quevedo
- Starring: Adar Mar Lupiañez; Vera Centenera
- Cinematography: Alana Mejía González
- Edited by: Diana Toucedo
- Music by: Paloma Peñarrubia
- Production companies: La Claqueta PC; La Cruda Realidad; Un Capricho de Producciones; Secaderos La Película AIE; Amplitud Inc.
- Distributed by: Begin Again Films
- Release dates: 18 September 2022 (Zinemaldia); 2 June 2023 (Spain)
- Countries: Spain; United States
- Language: Spanish

Tobacco Barns (Spanish: Secaderos) is a 2022 Spanish-American drama film written and directed by Rocío Mesa which stars Adar Mar Lupiañez and Vera Centenera.

== Plot ==
Set in the countryside of the Vega de Granada, the plot follows the stories of a 7-year-old girl from the city (Vera) feeling good during her holidays in the village and a local teen (Nieves) feeling caged in the same environment, as well as a magical monster made of tobacco leaves.

== Cast ==
- Vera Centenera as Vera
- Ada Mar Lupiáñez as Nieves
- Tamara Arias

== Production ==
The film was produced by La Claqueta PC, La Cruda Realidad, Un Capricho de Producciones, and Secaderos La Película AIE alongside Amplitud Inc., and in association with DDT Efectos Especiales and Fourminds Films, with the participation of Canal Sur, and backing from ICAA and ICEC. It was shot with a non-professional cast (with the exception of Tamara Arias) in the Vega de Granada.

== Release ==
The film world premiered at the 70th San Sebastián International Film Festival on 18 September 2022. Distributed by Begin Again Films, it was released theatrically in Spain on 2 June 2023.

== Reception ==
Carlos Marañón of Cinemanía rated the film 4 out of 5 stars, assessing that the fantasy presence manages to "illuminates an adult reflection without Manichaeism on rural life".

Javier Ocaña of El País, observed the affinities between Tobacco Barns and The Water and wrote that the helmer "composed a very free and recondite work" by means of "clear and simple, but highly effective, metaphors".

Daniel Grandes of Mondo Sonoro rated the film with 8 out of 10 points, deeming it to be "an impeccable display of magical realism".

== Accolades ==
| Year | Award | Category | Nominee(s) | Result | Ref. |
|---|---|---|---|---|---|
| 2022 | 70th San Sebastián International Film Festival | Dunia Ayaso Award | | Won | |
| 2023 | 2023 South by Southwest | Audience Award ('Visions' section) | | Won | |
| 2024 | 3rd Carmen Awards | Best New Director | Rocío Mesa | Nominated | |
| 2024 | 3rd Carmen Awards | Best Original Score | Paloma Peñarrubia | Won | |
| 2024 | 3rd Carmen Awards | Best Art Direction | Sergio Mauriño | Nominated | |
| 2024 | 3rd Carmen Awards | Best Costume Design | Merche Sanz | Nominated | |
| 2024 | 3rd Carmen Awards | Best Special Effects | Amparo Martínez | Won | |
| 2024 | 16th Gaudí Awards | Best Visual Effects | David Martí, Montse Ribé | Nominated | |

== See also ==
- List of Spanish films of 2023
