= 79th CEC Awards =

Spanish film awards

- Date: 5 February 2024
- Site: Palacio de la Prensa, Madrid, Spain
- Hosted by: Carlos Hipólito
- Organized by: Círculo de Escritores Cinematográficos

Highlights
- Most awards: Society of the Snow (5)
- Most nominations: Close Your Eyes (12)

The 79th CEC Medals ceremony, presented by the Círculo de Escritores Cinematográficos, took place on 5 February 2024 at the Palacio de la Prensa in Madrid. The gala was hosted by Carlos Hipólito.

== Winners and nominees ==
The winners and nominees are listed as follows:

Best Film: Society of the Snow; Close Your Eyes; 20,000 Species of Bees; Robot Dreams	Best Animation Film: Robot Dreams; They Shot the Piano Player; Mummies; Sultana's Dream
Best Director: Víctor Erice – Close Your Eyes; J.A. Bayona – Society of the Snow; David Trueba – Jokes & Cigarettes; Pablo Berger – Robot Dreams	Best New Director: Estibaliz Urresola Solaguren – 20,000 Species of Bees; Alejandro Rojas, Juan Sebastián Vázquez – Upon Entry; Alejandro Marín – Love & Revolution; Itsaso Arana – The Girls Are Alright; Álvaro Gago – Matria
Best Original Screenplay: Michel Gaztambide, Víctor Erice – Close Your Eyes; Estibaliz Urresola Solaguren – 20,000 Species of Bees; Alejandro Rojas, Juan Sebastián Vázquez – Upon Entry; Arantxa Echevarría – Chinas, a Second Generation Story	Best Adapted Screenplay: J.A. Bayona, Bernat Vilaplana, Jaime Marqués, Nicolás Casariego – Society of the Snow; Pablo Berger – Robot Dreams; Albert Espinosa, David Trueba – Jokes & Cigarettes; Paula Ortiz, Javier García Arredondo – Teresa
Best Actor: David Verdaguer – Jokes & Cigarettes; Manolo Solo – Close Your Eyes; Enric Auquer – The Teacher Who Promised the Sea; Miki Esparbé – Not Such an Easy Life	Best Actress: Malena Alterio – Something Is About to Happen; Carolina Yuste – Jokes & Cigarettes; Blanca Portillo – Teresa; Patricia López Arnaiz – 20,000 Species of Bees
Best Supporting Actor: José Coronado – Close Your Eyes; Josep Maria Pou – Close Your Eyes; Pedro Casablanc – Jokes & Cigarettes; Mario Pardo – Close Your Eyes	Best Supporting Actress: Ana Torrent – Close Your Eyes; Ane Gabarain – 20,000 Species of Bees; Luisa Gavasa – The Teacher Who Promised the Sea; Carolina Yuste – Chinas, a Second Generation Story
Best New Actor: Matías Recalt – Society of the Snow; Brianeitor – Championext; Omar Banana – Love & Revolution; Julio Hu Chen – Chinas, a Second Generation Story	Best New Actress: Xinyi Ye – Chinas, a Second Generation Story; Lupe Mateo Barredo – Andrea's Love; Venecia Franco – Close Your Eyes; Yeju Ji – Chinas, a Second Generation Story; Sara Becker – The Movie Teller
Best Cinematography: Pedro Luque – Society of the Snow; Valentín Álvarez – Close Your Eyes; Gina Ferrer García – 20,000 Species of Bees; Sergi Vilanova Claudín – Jokes & Cigarettes	Best Editing: Andrés Gil, Jaume Martí – Society of the Snow; Ascen Marchena – Close Your Eyes; Marta Velasco – Jokes & Cigarettes; Raúl Barreras – 20,000 Species of Bees
Best Music: Alfonso de Vilallonga – Robot Dreams; Michael Giacchino – Society of the Snow; Federico Jusid – Close Your Eyes; Fernando Velázquez – The Movie Teller; Natasha Arizu – The Teacher Who Promised the Sea	Best Documentary Film: Juan Mariné, un siglo de cine; Hay una puerta ahí; El caso Padilla; La vida de Brianeitor; Libres
Best Foreign Film: Killers of the Flower Moon; Oppenheimer; Past Lives; Fallen Leaves; Anatomy of a Fall

== Special awards ==
- Honorary Medal: Álex de la Iglesia
- Medal for the Promotion of Cinema: Enrique Cerezo
- Medal for the Journalistic Merit: Julieta Martialay
- Medal for the Literary Merit: Hatari! Books
- 'Platino Educa de la Solidaridad' Medal (Fiction): Chinas, a Second Generation Story
- 'Platino Educa de la Solidaridad' Medal (non-Fiction): La vida de Brianeitor
