= The Teacher Who Promised the Sea =

- Film poster
- Spanish: El maestro que prometió el mar
- Directed by: Patricia Font
- Screenplay by: Albert Val
- Based on: El mestre que va prometre el mar; Francesc Escribano
- Produced by: Francesc Escribano; Tono Folguera; Carlos Fernández; Laura Fernández Brites; David Felani
- Starring: Enric Auquer; Laia Costa; Luisa Gavasa
- Cinematography: David Valldelpérez
- Edited by: Dani Arregui
- Music by: Natasha Arizu
- Production companies: Minoria Absoluta; Lastor Media; Castelao Productions; Mestres Films AIE
- Distributed by: Filmax
- Release dates: 27 October 2023 (Seminci); 10 November 2023 (Spain)
- Running time: 105 minutes
- Country: Spain
- Languages: Spanish; Catalan
- Box office: €1.7 million

The Teacher Who Promised the Sea (Spanish: El maestro que prometió el mar) is a 2023 Spanish historical drama film directed by Patricia Font from a screenplay by Albert Val, based on the book by Francesc Escribano. It stars Enric Auquer and Laia Costa alongside Luisa Gavasa.

== Plot ==
The plot tracks the story of Catalan teacher Antoni Benaiges, destined in 1935 to a small village in the province of Burgos (introducing the innovative and inspiring teaching method according to Freinet from France among the children before being murdered by Falangists during the Civil War). It also relates the present-day story of Ariadna, seeking to find out what happened to her great-grandfather, who disappeared during the War. (Note: Bañuelos de Bureba (Burgos) and Mont-roig del Camp (Tarragona))

== Cast ==
- Enric Auquer as Antoni Benaiges
- Laia Costa as Ariadna
- Luisa Gavasa as Charo
- Gael Aparicio as Carlos
- Alba Hermoso as Josefina
- Nicolás Calvo as Emilio (child)
- Milo Taboada as Primitivo
- Ramon Agirre as Emilio (old)

== Production ==
Written by Albert Val, the screenplay is an adaptation of the book by Francesc Escribano. The film is a Minoria Absoluta, Lastor Media, Filmax, and Mestres Films AIE production with the participation of RTVE and TV3 and backing from ICAA and ICEC. Shooting locations included Mura and Briviesca.

== Release ==
The film had its world premiere at the 68th Valladolid International Film Festival on 27 October 2023. Distributed by Filmax, it was released theatrically in Spain on 10 November 2023. It opened in only 83 screens, but the satisfactory box office performance (with a positive weekly change in the gross reportedly owing to the word of mouth) led to an increase in the number of screens up to 124. Distributed by Palace Films, it opened in Australian theatres on 26 July 2024 in 22 screens, eventually grossing $436,744. It was released theatrically in Italy on 19 September 2024 in 84 screens, likewise coming to gross €551,066.

== Reception ==
On the review aggregator website Rotten Tomatoes, 100% of 5 critics' reviews are positive, with an average rating of 7.5/10.

Ekaitz Ortega of HobbyConsolas rated the film with 73 points ('good') highlighting how it "has its own identity, it is not complacent and the two [lead] actors standing out", as the best things about it.

Enid Román Almansa of Cinemanía rated the film 4½ out of 5 stars underscoring "a very sad and terrible story, a very beautiful film".

Jason Blake of Limelight rated the film 4 out of 5 stars, deeming it to be "a powerful reminder that the scars of Spain's 20th century history are everywhere".

== Accolades ==
Year	Award	Category	Nominee(s)	Result	Ref.
2024	11th Feroz Awards	Best Actor in a Film	Enric Auquer	Nominated	
2024	11th Feroz Awards	Best Supporting Actress in a Film	Luisa Gavasa	Nominated	
2024	16th Gaudí Awards	Best Non-Catalan Language Film		Nominated	
2024	16th Gaudí Awards	Best Adapted Screenplay	Albert Val	Nominated	
2024	16th Gaudí Awards	Best Actor	Enric Auquer	Nominated	
2024	16th Gaudí Awards	Best Art Direction	Josep Rosell	Nominated	
2024	16th Gaudí Awards	Best Costume Design	Maria Armengol	Nominated	
2024	16th Gaudí Awards	Best Makeup and Hairstyles	Patricia Reyes	Nominated	
2024	79th CEC Medals	Best Actor	Enric Auquer	Nominated	
2024	79th CEC Medals	Best Supporting Actress	Luis Gavasa	Nominated	
2024	79th CEC Medals	Best Original Score	Natasha Arizu	Nominated	
2024	38th Goya Awards	Best Adapted Screenplay	Albert Val	Nominated	
2024	38th Goya Awards	Best Actor	Enric Auquer	Nominated	
2024	38th Goya Awards	Best Supporting Actress	Luisa Gavasa	Nominated	
2024	38th Goya Awards	Best Original Score	Natasha Arizu	Nominated	
2024	38th Goya Awards	Best Costume Design	Maria Armengol	Nominated	

== See also ==
- List of Spanish films of 2023
