= Patricia Ortega =

Venezuelan film director (born 1977)

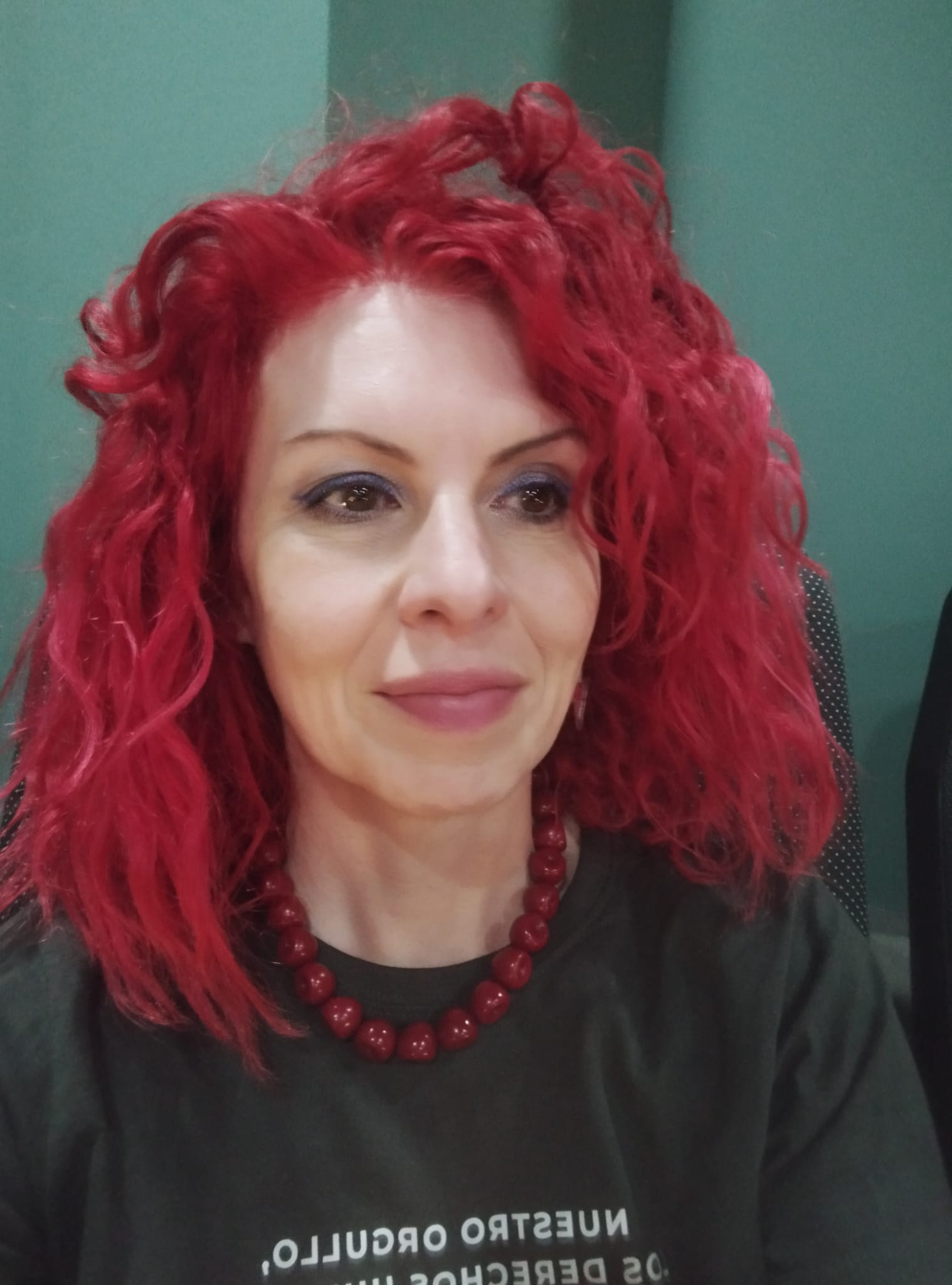
- Ortega in 2025
- Born: 1977 (age 48–49); Maracaibo, Venezuela
- Education: Escuela Internacional de Cine y Televisión
- Occupations: Director; Screenwriter; Producer
- Years active: 2004–present

Patricia Ortega (Venezuelan Spanish pronunciation: [paˈtɾisia oɾˈteɡa], born 1977) is a Venezuelan film director, screenwriter/scriptwriter & producer. She has won multiple accolades, particularly for her 2018 film Being Impossible, and also in 2024, she won Best Director for her film Mamacruz, in the Carmen Awards

== Early life ==
Ortega says that she has been a movie lover since she was young, and so the decision to become a filmmaker was natural. She has studied journalism at university.

== Career ==
Ortega studied at the Escuela Internacional de Cine y Televisión in Cuba, specialising in Film Direction.

After creating some short films, Ortega became president of the independent Venezuelan production company Mandrágora Films in 2009. In the next ten years, she made ten short fiction and documentary films with the company; in 2013 she directed her first feature film, El regreso (English: The Return), which saw a wide commercial release in cinemas across Venezuela.

Her second feature film, Being Impossible (Spanish: Yo, imposible), however, did well internationally and has yet to be released in her home nation. Ortega has drawn strength from Being Impossible during times of both personal and political upheaval. She found out that Being Impossible would be screening at the US film festival South by Southwest on the same day that Juan Guaidó was declared Acting President of Venezuela; she found the news of the screening "beautiful", but this was overwhelmed by the political situation that "worried" her. Ortega won the Best Director and Best Screenplay awards at the Venezuelan Film Festival in June 2019 for Being Impossible.

In 2019, she began development of her third feature film, Mamacruz.

== Personal life ==
Ortega was raised in a religious Catholic family, and says that she was always the black sheep of the family who did not follow traditional roles. She is divorced, and has lived in Porlamar on the Venezuelan Caribbean island of Margarita. She now lives in Seville, Spain, with her partner.

== Filmography ==
- Pasajes (2004)
- Al otro lado del mar (2006)
- The Return (2013)
- La T invisible (2017, short film)
- Being Impossible (2018)
- Mamacruz (2023)
- 9 Moons (2026)
- Caballé (2026)

== Awards and nominations ==
Year	Event	Award	Work	Result	Ref.
2013	Festival Entre Largos y Cortos de Oriente (ELCO)	Best First Feature	The Return	Won	
2014	Margarita Latin American and Caribbean Film Festival	Golden Pelican for Best Fiction Film	The Return	Won	
2018	Havana Film Festival	Unete Award	Being Impossible	Special Recognition	
2018	Valladolid International Film Festival	Rainbow Spike Award	Being Impossible	Won	
2019	Femme Revolution Film Fest	Best Construction of a Female Character	Being Impossible	Won	
2019	Amsterdam LGBTI Film Festival	Best Mix Feature Audience Award	Being Impossible	Won	
2019	Reflections of Spanish and Latin American Cinema Festival	Audience Award	Being Impossible	Won	
2019	South by Southwest	Gamechanger Award	Being Impossible	Nominated	
2019	Venezuelan Film Festival	Best Director	Being Impossible	Won	
2019	Venezuelan Film Festival	Best Screenplay (with Enmanuel Chávez)	Being Impossible	Won	
2019	Houston International LGBTQ Film Festival	Best Script (with Enmanuel Chávez)	Being Impossible	Won	
2020	Platino Awards	Best Director	Being Impossible	Nominated	
