= Festival de Cine Entre Largos y Cortos de Oriente =

- Status: active
- Genre: Film festival
- Frequency: Annually
- Country: Venezuela
- Years active: 15
- Next event: 20-22 September 2019
- Participants: 50
- Attendance: 7500+
- Area: Lecheria

The Festival de Cine Entre Largos y Cortos de Oriente, better known as ELCO, is a Venezuelan film festival.

== History ==
The festival is run by the ELCO Foundation, which aims to promote and distribute national cinema as a means of encouraging new artists into the industry. Its first edition was in September 2011.

It accepts entries in all style of film, from anyone anywhere in the world, and was said to be "one of the fastest growing film festivals in Venezuela" by director Vadim Lasca in 2016.

The festival is judged by many famous writers, directors, and producers of the country, and the ELCO Grand Prize "represents one of the most important statuettes in Venezuelan cinema".

The 2019 edition will be held in Venezuela and Ecuador.

== Award Categories ==
There have been different awards throughout the festival's span. The awards as of the ninth edition are:

=== Margot Benacerraf Feature Film Awards ===
- ELCO Grand Prize
- Best Fiction Feature Film
- Best Documentary Feature
- Best Animated Feature Film
- Audience Award

=== Román Chalbaud Short Film Awards ===
- Best Short Film ELCO
- Best Fiction Short Film
- Best Documentary Short Film
- Best Short Film Animation
- Best University Short Film

=== Past categories ===
The categories awarded at the third edition were:

Feature films

- Margot Benacerraf Award
- ELCO Grand Prize
- Best Film
- Best Fiction Film
- Best First Feature
- Best Documentary
- Best Regional Feature
- Best Feature of New National Cinema
- Best Director
- Best Cinematography
- Best Writing
- Best Sound
- Best Soundtrack
- Best Production Design
- Best Production
- Audience Award
- Best Actor
- Best Supporting Actor
- Best Actress
- Best Supporting Actress
- Best Advertisement

Short films

- Román Chalbaud Award
- Best Short Film
- Best National Short Fiction Film
- Best National Short Documentary
- Best National Animated Short
- Best National Student Short
- Best Regional Short Fiction Film, from Eastern Venezuela
- Best National Fighting for Freedom Short Film
- Best New Cinema Short Film
- Best ELCO National Challenge Film
- Best Community Short
- Best Video clip
- POSA Award for Best Editing (winner receives a free course in using Adobe Premiere Pro or Final Cut Pro editing software)
- Escuela Nacional del Cine Award for ELCO Challenge winner (winners receive a scholarship)
- Xenón Films Award for production
