= Kiti Mánver =

Spanish actress

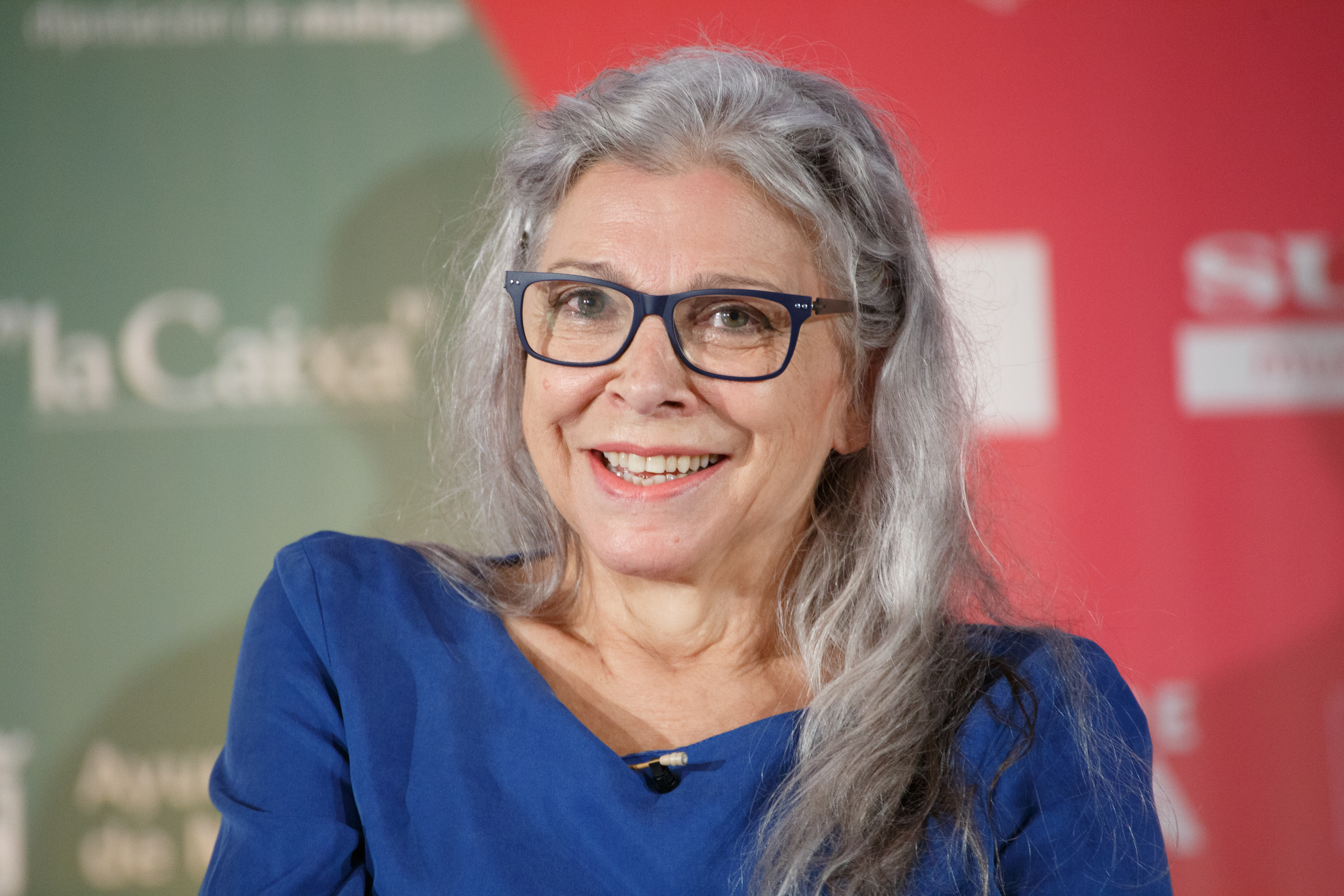
- Mánver in 2020
- Born: María Isabel Ana Mantecón Vernalte; 11 May 1953 (age 73); Antequera, Spain
- Other name: Kiti Manver
- Occupation: Actress
- Years active: 1970–present

María Isabel Ana Mantecón Vernalte (born 11 May 1953), better known as Kiti Mánver, is a Spanish actress. She has appeared in more than 100 films and television shows since 1970.

== Biography ==
María Isabel Ana Mantecón Vernalte was born in Antequera on 11 May 1953. She spent her early childhood in between Málaga and Melilla, moving to Madrid at age 13. She made her feature film debut in Chicas de club (1970), playing a girl version of the character Elisa who is raped by her godfather. She then featured in the 1973 film Habla, mudita.

Her performance in the crime thriller Anything for Bread (1991) won her the Goya Award for Best Supporting Actress. In the film, she portrayed a refined, cultured nursing home director who forms a tandem with a porn actress to recover the cache from a bingo robbery.

In 2015, she came to the London stage to play the lead role in Las heridas del viento, a play by Juan Carlos Rubio, as part of the 3rd Festival of Spanish Theatre in London (Festelón).

== Selected filmography ==
=== Film ===
Year	Title	Role	Notes	Ref.
1970	Chicas de club	Elisa	Feature film debut	
1973	Habla, mudita			
1980	Ópera prima (Opera Prima)	Ana		
1984	¿Qué he hecho yo para merecer esto? (What Have I Done to Deserve This?)	Juani		
1987	Luna de lobos (Wolves' Moon)	María		
1988	Mujeres al borde de un ataque de nervios (Women on the Verge of a Nervous Breakdown)	Paulina Morales		
1988	Pasodoble	Camila		
1991	Todo por la pasta (Anything for Bread)	Verónica		
1992	Una mujer bajo la lluvia (A Woman in the Rain)	Alicia		
1992	La reina anónima (The Anonymous Queen)	Profesora		
1994	Todos los hombres sois iguales (All Men Are the Same)	Esther		
1995	La flor de mi secreto (The Flower of My Secret)	Manuela		
1995	El seductor	Aurora		
1995	Boca a boca (Mouth to Mouth)	Lucy		
1996	La sal de la vida	Consuelo		
1996	Brujas			
1997	Cosas que dejé en La Habana (Things I Left in Havana)	Azucena		
1997	No se puede tener todo	Nely		
1998	Una pareja perfecta (A Perfect Couple)	Anita		
2000	La comunidad (Common Wealth)	Dolores		
2002	El caballero Don Quijote (Don Quixote, Knight Errant)	Ama		
2003	La luz prodigiosa (The End of a Mystery)	Adela		
2003	Te doy mis ojos (Take My Eyes)	Rosa		
2007	Luz de domingo (Sunday Light)	Doña Predes		
2009	Pagafantas (Friend Zone)	Gloria		
2010	Una hora más en Canarias (With or Without Love)	Daniela		
2011	Lo contrario al amor (The Opposite of Love)	María Amparo		
2020	El inconveniente (One Careful Owner)	Lola		
2023	Mamacruz	Cruz		

=== Television ===
- Gran Hotel (2011)
- Cable Girls (2017)
- Money Heist (2017)
- Two Graves (2025)

== Accolades ==
Year	Award	Category	Work	Result	Ref.
1992	6th Goya Awards	Best Supporting Actress	Anything for Bread	Won	
1998	1st Málaga Film Festival	Best Actress	A Perfect Couple	Won	
2003	12th Actors and Actresses Union Awards	Best Stage Actress in a Leading Role	El matrimonio de Boston	Won	
2021	26th Forqué Awards	Best Film Actress	One Careful Owner	Nominated	
2021	8th Feroz Awards	Best Actress in a Film	One Careful Owner	Nominated	
2021	76th CEC Medals	Best Actress	One Careful Owner	Nominated	
2021	35th Goya Awards	Best Actress	One Careful Owner	Nominated	
2024	11th Feroz Awards	Best Actress in a Film	Mamacruz	Nominated	
2024	3rd Carmen Awards	Best Actress	Mamacruz	Won	
2026	34th Actors and Actresses Union Awards	Best Stage Actress in a Secondary Role	Música para Hitler	Nominated	
